= Arén Formation =

Geological formation

- Stratigraphic range: Campanian-Maastrichtian; ~84–66 Ma
- Type: Geological formation
- Unit of: Tremp-Graus Basin
- Underlies: Tremp Group

Lithology
- Primary: Sandstone
- Other: Limestone

Location
- Coordinates: 42.3°N 1.6°E
- Approximate paleocoordinates: 34.0°N 1.6°E
- Region: Lérida
- Country: Spain

Type section
- Named for: Arén
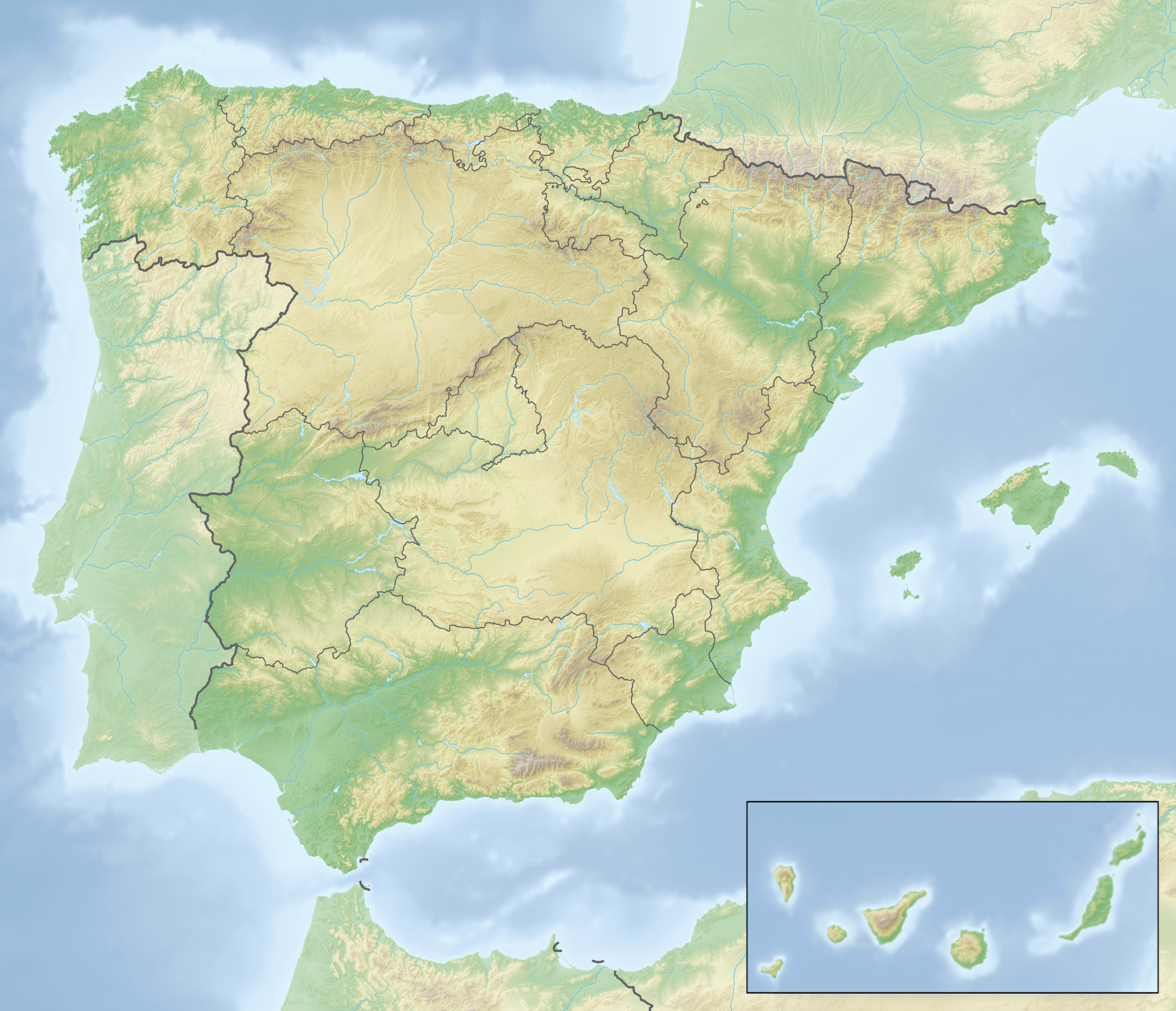
- Arén Formation (Spain) Arén Formation (Catalonia)

The Arén Formation or Arén Sandstone (Catalan: Calcàries i gresos d’Areny) is a geological formation in the Tremp-Graus Basin around Arén, Catalonia, Spain whose strata date back to the Late Cretaceous. Dinosaur remains are among the fossils that have been recovered from the formation. The formation dates to the Campanian to Maastrichtian and underlies the Tremp Group.

== Fossil content ==
=== Dinosaurs ===
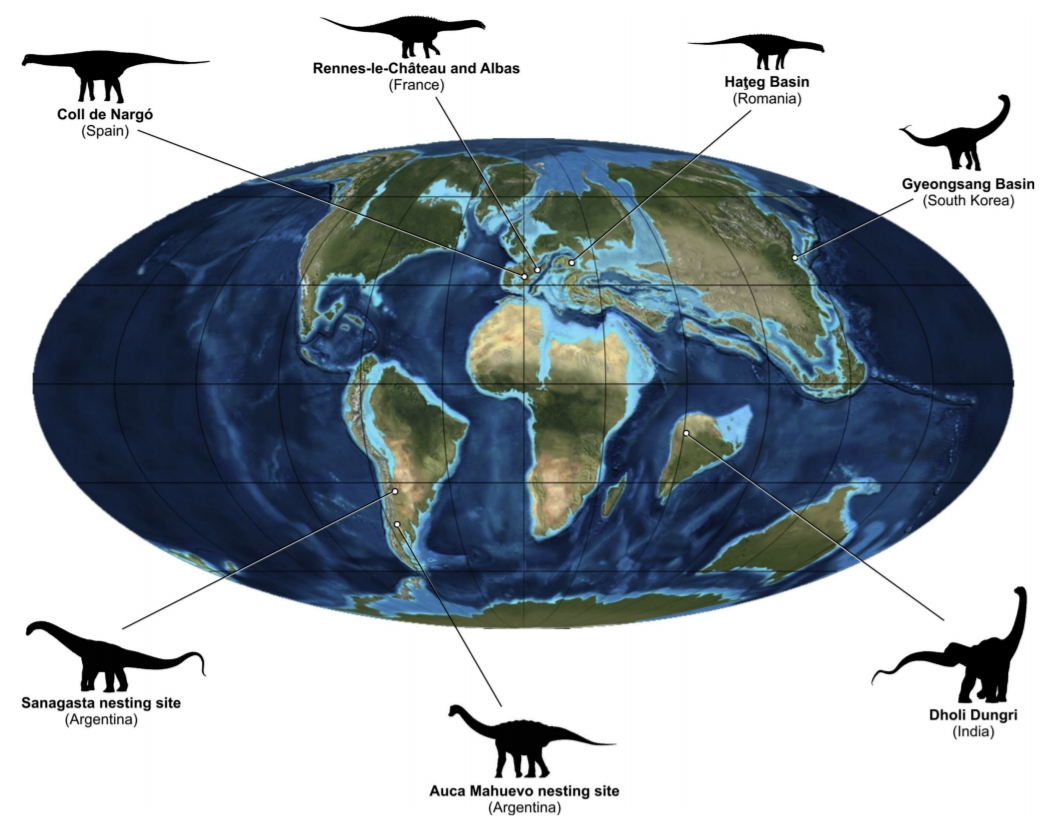
Paleogeography of the Maastrichtian and distribution of titanosaur nesting sites

Dinosaur eggs (Megaloolithus baghensis, Sankofa pyrenaica), sauropod tracks, unnamed sauropod remains, theropod tracks, euornithopod tracks, and an unnamed iguanodont remains present in Lérida Province.

Dinosaurs of the Arén Formation
Genus	Species	Location	Stratigraphic position	Abundance	Notes	Images
Richardoestesia	Indeterminate	Lérida				
Hypselosaurus	Indeterminate	Lérida			Later found to be unknown sauropod remains	
Orthomerus	Indeterminate	Lérida				
Pararhabdodon	P. isonensis	Lérida				
Rhabdodon	R. priscus	Lérida				
Titanosaurus	T. indicus	Lérida			Later found to be indeterminate sauropod remains	

== See also ==
- List of dinosaur-bearing rock formations

== Paleontological sites of interest ==
-Les Serretes. It is a place in Vilamitjana municipality known by the finding of an important paleontological site. In this site there have found dinosaur remains that belongs to the Second biggest hadrosaur found in Spain, and the biggest of Catalonia. Also there have been found two carnívor dinosaur tooth that belongs to two new dinosaur species morphotypes.

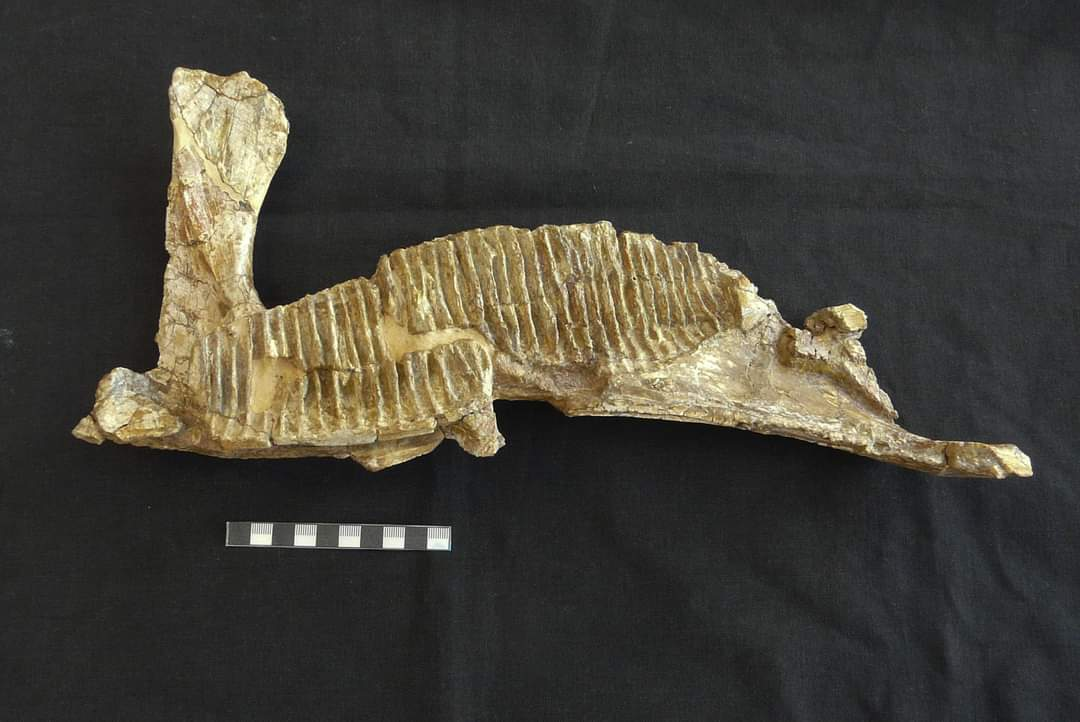

Picture of the dentary from les Serretes. Nowadays exposed on the Museum of Isona.
