= Isona i Conca Dellà =

- Municipality
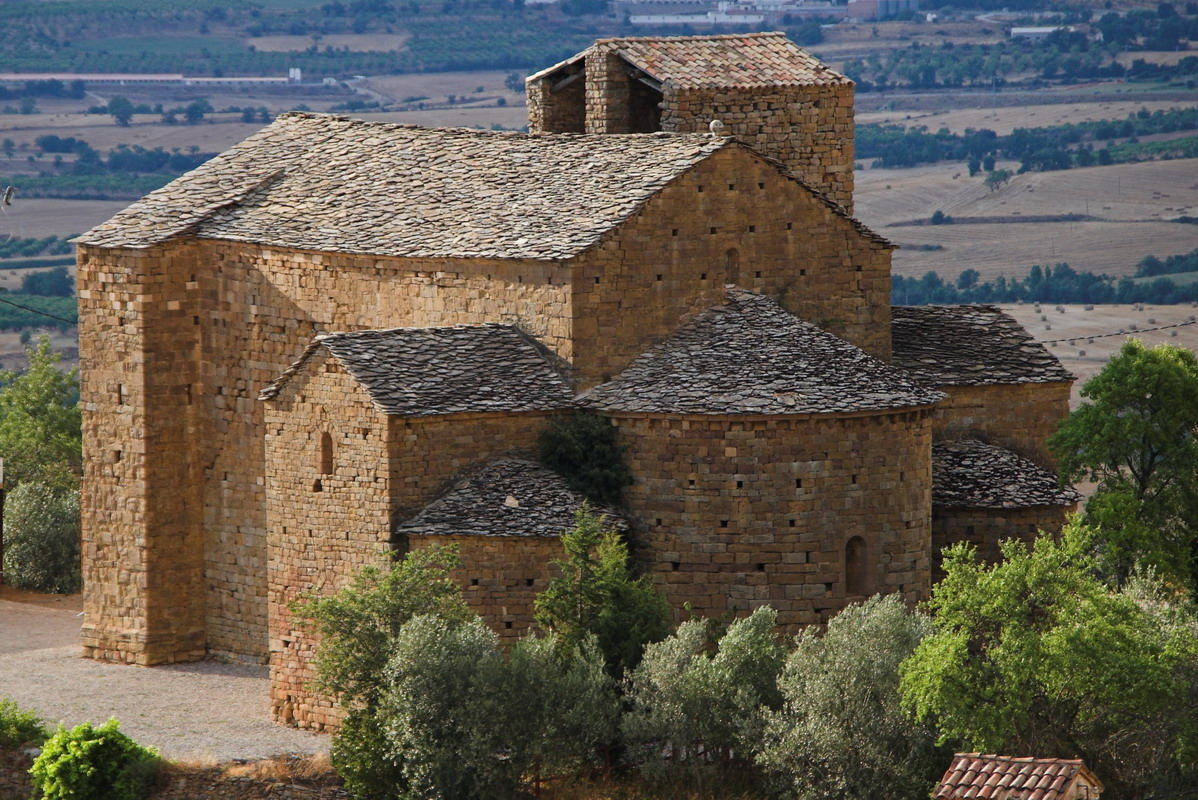
- Santa Maria de Covet church

- Flag Coat of arms

- Location in Catalonia
- Coordinates: 42°7′12″N 1°2′53″E
- Country: Spain
- Community: Catalonia
- Province: Lleida
- Comarca: Pallars Jussà

Government
  - Mayor: Constantí Aranda Farrero (2015)

Area
  - Total: 139.4 km^{2} (53.8 sq mi)
- Elevation: 659 m (2,162 ft)

Population (2025-01-01)
  - Total: 1,038
  - Density: 7.446/km^{2} (19.29/sq mi)
- Demonym(s): Isonenc, isonenca
- Website: isona.cat

Isona i Conca Dellà (Catalan pronunciation: [iˈzonɛj ˈkoŋkɛ ðaˈʎa]) is a municipality in the comarca of the Pallars Jussà in Catalonia, Spain. It is situated in the valley of the Conques river in the south-east of the comarca. It has a population of 1,038 (register office, 2025).

It was formed in 1970 by the fusion of the following municipalities: Isona, Basturs, Benavent de la Conca, Biscarri, Conques, Covet, Gramenet, Llordà, Masos de Sant Martí, Montodó, Orcau i Figuerola d'Orcau, Sant Romà d'Abella and Siall. The town hall is in Isona. The municipality is served by the C-1412 road between Artesa de Segre and Tremp, and is linked to Coll de Nargó by the L-511. It includes a small exclave to the south.

The church of Santa Maria in Covet and Llordà castle are protected historico-artistic monuments.

== Subdivisions ==
The municipality of Isona and Conca Dellà is formed of fourteen villages. Populations are given as of 2005:

- Basturs (40), three kilometres south-east of Orcau
- Benavent de la Conca (26), at the foot of a 200 m hill of conglomerate
- Biscarri (53), at the foot of the Moles range at the edge of the Tremp basin
- Conques (98)
- Covet (5)
- Figuerola d'Orcau (181)
- Gramenet (1)
- Isona (619)
- Llordà (10)
- Els Masos de Sant Martí
- Montadó (3)
- Orcau (18)
- Sant Romà d'Abella (89)
- Siall (6)

== Demography ==
Populations from before 1970 are the totals of the populations of the former municipalities.

1900	1930	1950	1970	1986	2007
3522	2695	2257	1615	1502	1153
