= La Torre de Tamúrcia =

- Locality
- Location within Province of Lleida Location within Catalonia Location within Spain
- Coordinates: 42°17′31″N 0°47′50″E
- Country: Spain
- Community: Catalonia
- Province: Lleida
- Municipality: Tremp
- Elevation: 1,044 m (3,425 ft)

Population
  - Total: 10

La Torre de Tamúrcia is a hamlet located in the municipality of Tremp, in Province of Lleida province, Catalonia, Spain. As of 2020, it has a population of 10.

== Geography ==
La Torre de Tamúrcia is located 109km north-northeast of Lleida.
