= Claramunt (Tremp) =

- Locality
- Location within Province of Lleida Location within Catalonia Location within Spain
- Coordinates: 42°10′44″N 0°46′57″E
- Country: Spain
- Community: Catalonia
- Province: Lleida
- Municipality: Tremp
- Elevation: 1,095 m (3,593 ft)

Population
  - Total: 1

Claramunt is a hamlet located in the municipality of Fígols de Tremp, annexed to the municipality of Tremp in 1970, in Province of Lleida province, Catalonia, Spain. As of 2020, it has a population of 1.

== History ==
In the 1359 census, Claramunt does not appear; in 1831 it did, with 28 inhabitants, and around 1900 there were 25 buildings, with 79 inhabitants. In 2006, only 1 inhabitant were registered.

In 1812, it had formed its own town council under the provisions of the Cádiz Constitution, but it had to be annexed to Castissent in February 1847, as it did not exceed the minimum of 30 households required to maintain its own council.

== Geography ==
Claramunt is located 103km north-northeast of Lleida.
