= Puigcercós =

- Locality
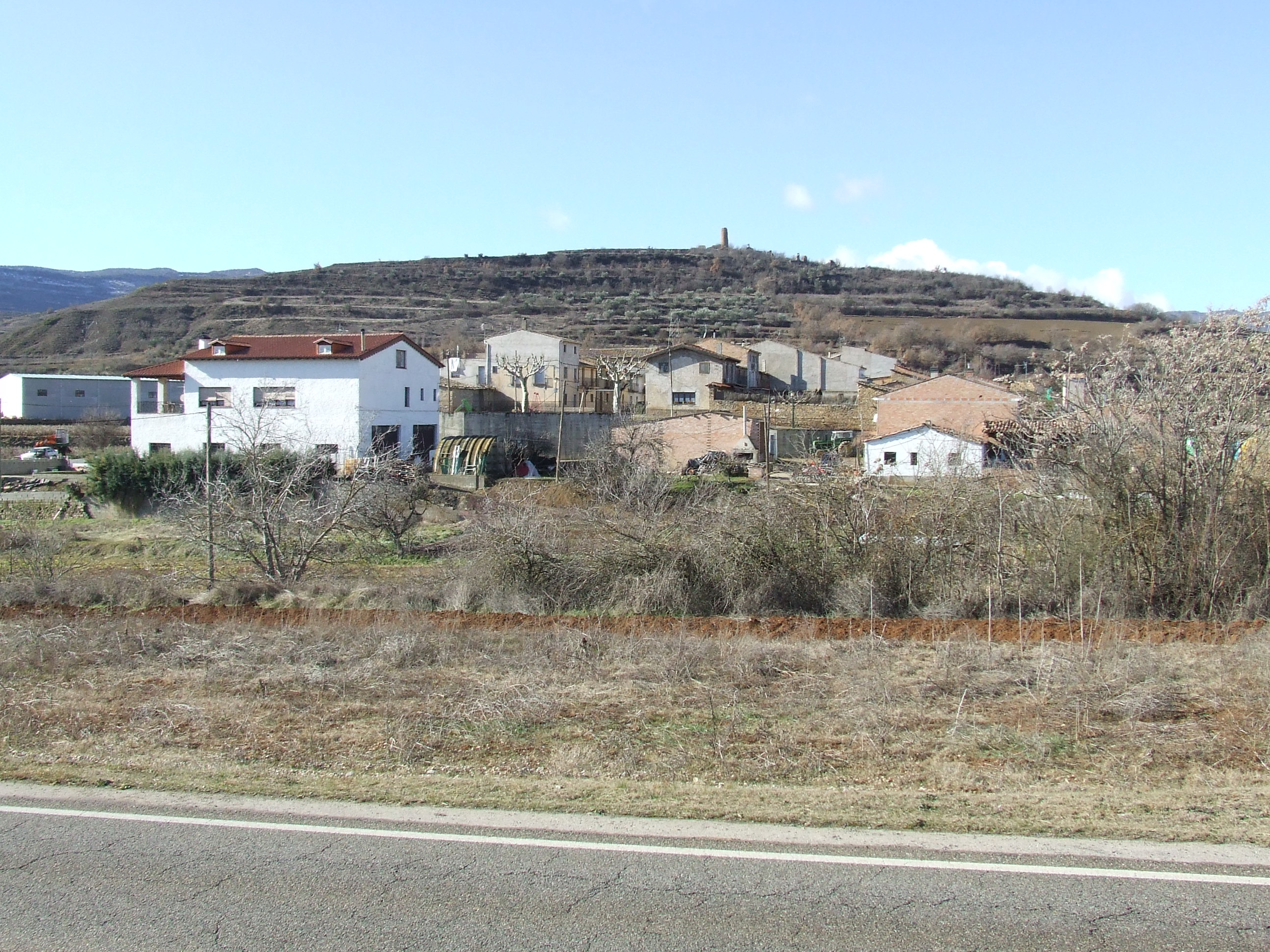

- Location within Province of Lleida Location within Catalonia Location within Spain
- Coordinates: 42°7′54″N 0°53′30″E
- Country: Spain
- Community: Catalonia
- Province: Lleida
- Municipality: Tremp
- Elevation: 441 m (1,447 ft)

Population
  - Total: 41

Puigcercós is a locality located in the municipality of Tremp, in Province of Lleida province, Catalonia, Spain. As of 2023, it has a population of 35.

== Geography ==
Puigcercós is located 87km north-northeast of Lleida.
