= Torogó =

- Locality
- Location within Province of Lleida Location within Catalonia Location within Spain
- Coordinates: 42°17′16″N 0°48′46″E
- Country: Spain
- Community: Catalonia
- Province: Lleida
- Municipality: Tremp
- Elevation: 968 m (3,176 ft)

Population
  - Total: 6

Torogó is a locality located in the municipality of Tremp, in Province of Lleida province, Catalonia, Spain. As of 2020, it has a population of 6.

== Geography ==
Torogó is located 111km north-northeast of Lleida.
