= Casterner de les Olles =

- Locality
- Location within Province of Lleida Location within Catalonia Location within Spain
- Coordinates: 42°20′26″N 0°45′2″E
- Country: Spain
- Community: Catalonia
- Province: Lleida
- Municipality: Tremp
- Elevation: 862 m (2,828 ft)

Population
  - Total: 1

Casterner de les Olles is a locality located in the municipality of Tremp, in Province of Lleida province, Catalonia, Spain. As of 2020, it has a population of 1.
