= Sapeira =

- Locality
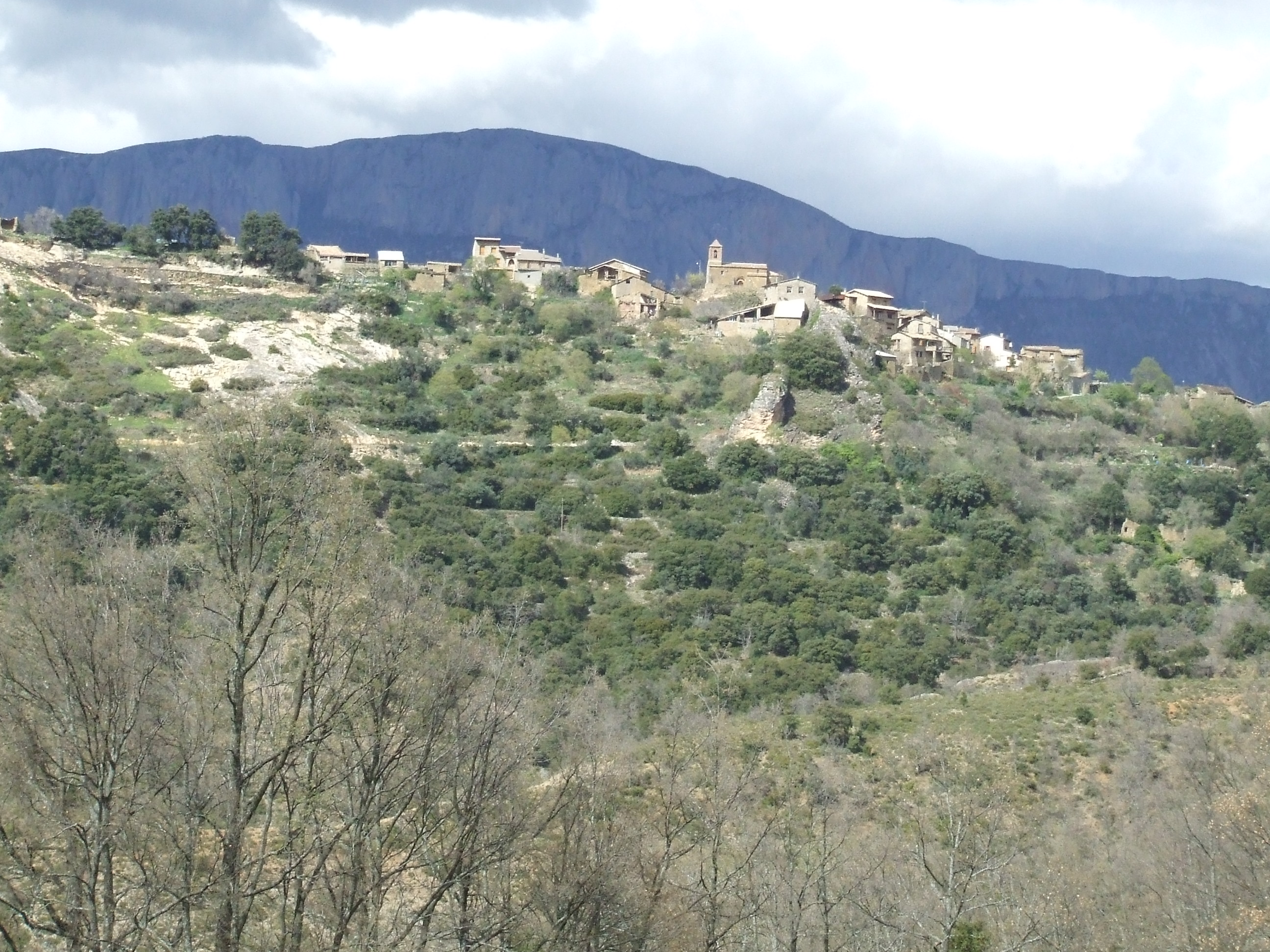

- Location within Province of Lleida Location within Catalonia Location within Spain
- Coordinates: 42°15′14″N 0°47′27″E
- Country: Spain
- Community: Catalonia
- Province: Lleida
- Municipality: Tremp
- Elevation: 998 m (3,274 ft)

Population
  - Total: 4

Sapeira is a hamlet located in the municipality of Tremp, in Province of Lleida province, Catalonia, Spain. As of 2020, it has a population of 4.

== Geography ==
Sapeira is located 106km north-northeast of Lleida.
