= Palau de Noguera =

- Locality
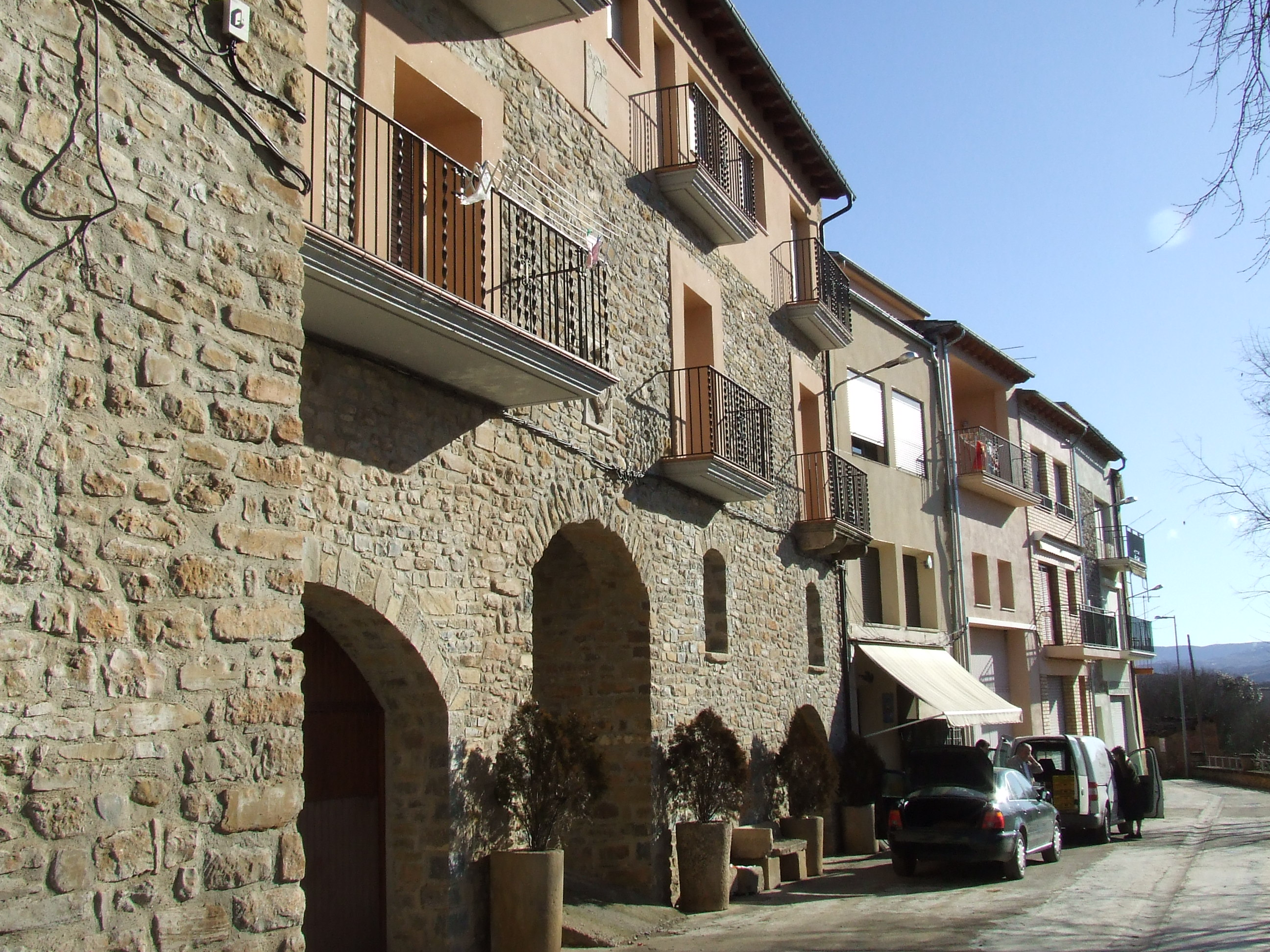

- Location within Province of Lleida Location within Catalonia Location within Spain
- Coordinates: 42°8′49″N 0°53′44″E
- Country: Spain
- Community: Catalonia
- Province: Lleida
- Municipality: Tremp
- Elevation: 438 m (1,437 ft)

Population
  - Total: 62

Palau de Noguera is a locality located in the municipality of Tremp, in Province of Lleida province, Catalonia, Spain. As of 2020, it has a population of 62.

== Geography ==
Palau de Noguera is located 89km north-northeast of Lleida.
