= Eroles =

- Locality
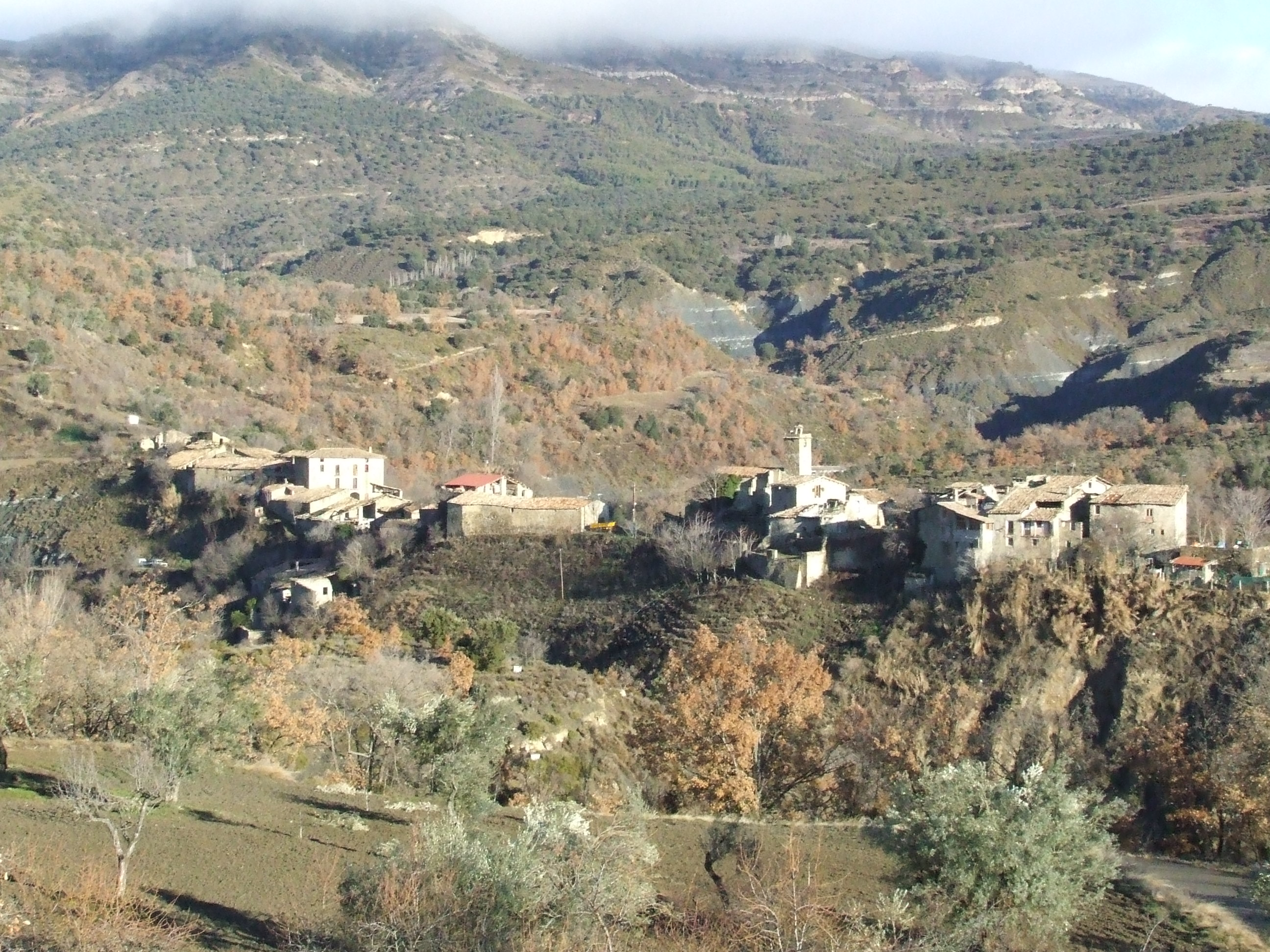

- Location within Province of Lleida Location within Catalonia Location within Spain
- Coordinates: 42°10′22″N 0°49′1″E
- Country: Spain
- Community: Catalonia
- Province: Lleida
- Municipality: Tremp
- Elevation: 690 m (2,260 ft)

Population
  - Total: 16

Eroles is a locality located in the municipality of Tremp, in Province of Lleida province, Catalonia, Spain. As of 2020, it has a population of 16.

== Geography ==
Eroles is located 108km north-northeast of Lleida.
