= Basturs =

- Locality
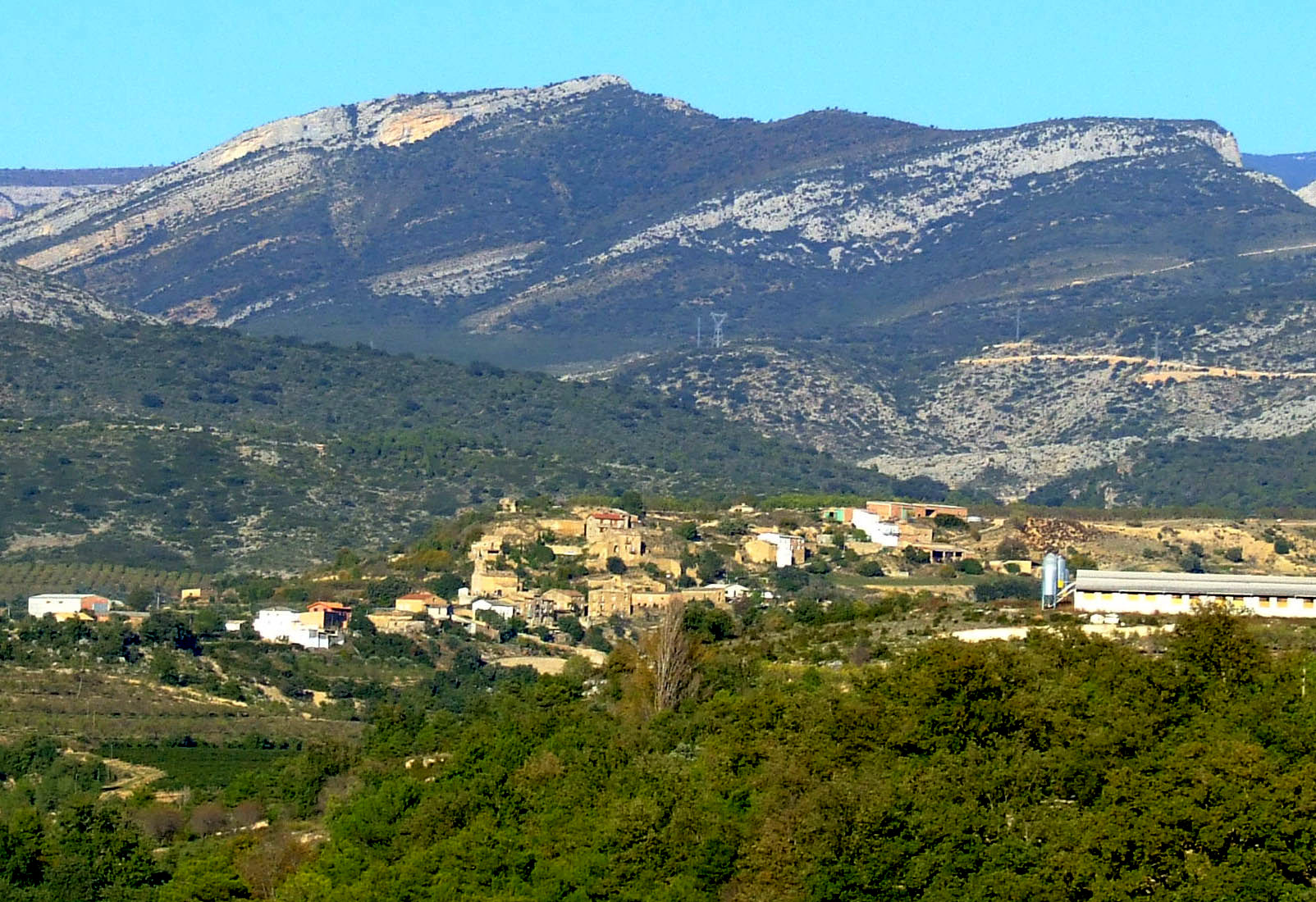

- Location within Province of Lleida Location within Catalonia Location within Spain
- Coordinates: 42°9′8″N 1°0′44″E
- Country: Spain
- Community: Catalonia
- Province: Lleida
- Municipality: Isona i Conca Dellà
- Elevation: 632 m (2,073 ft)

Population
  - Total: 27

Basturs is a hamlet located in the municipality of Isona i Conca Dellà, in Province of Lleida province, Catalonia, Spain. As of 2020, it has a population of 27.

== Geography ==
Basturs is located 102km north-northeast of Lleida.
