= Tercui =

- Locality
- Location within Province of Lleida Location within Catalonia Location within Spain
- Coordinates: 42°10′44″N 0°43′17″E
- Country: Spain
- Community: Catalonia
- Province: Lleida
- Municipality: Tremp
- Elevation: 765 m (2,510 ft)

Population
  - Total: 1

Tercui is a hamlet located in the municipality of Tremp, in Province of Lleida province, Catalonia, Spain. As of 2020, it has a population of 1.

== Geography ==
Tercui is located 94km north of Lleida.
