= Llordà =

- Locality
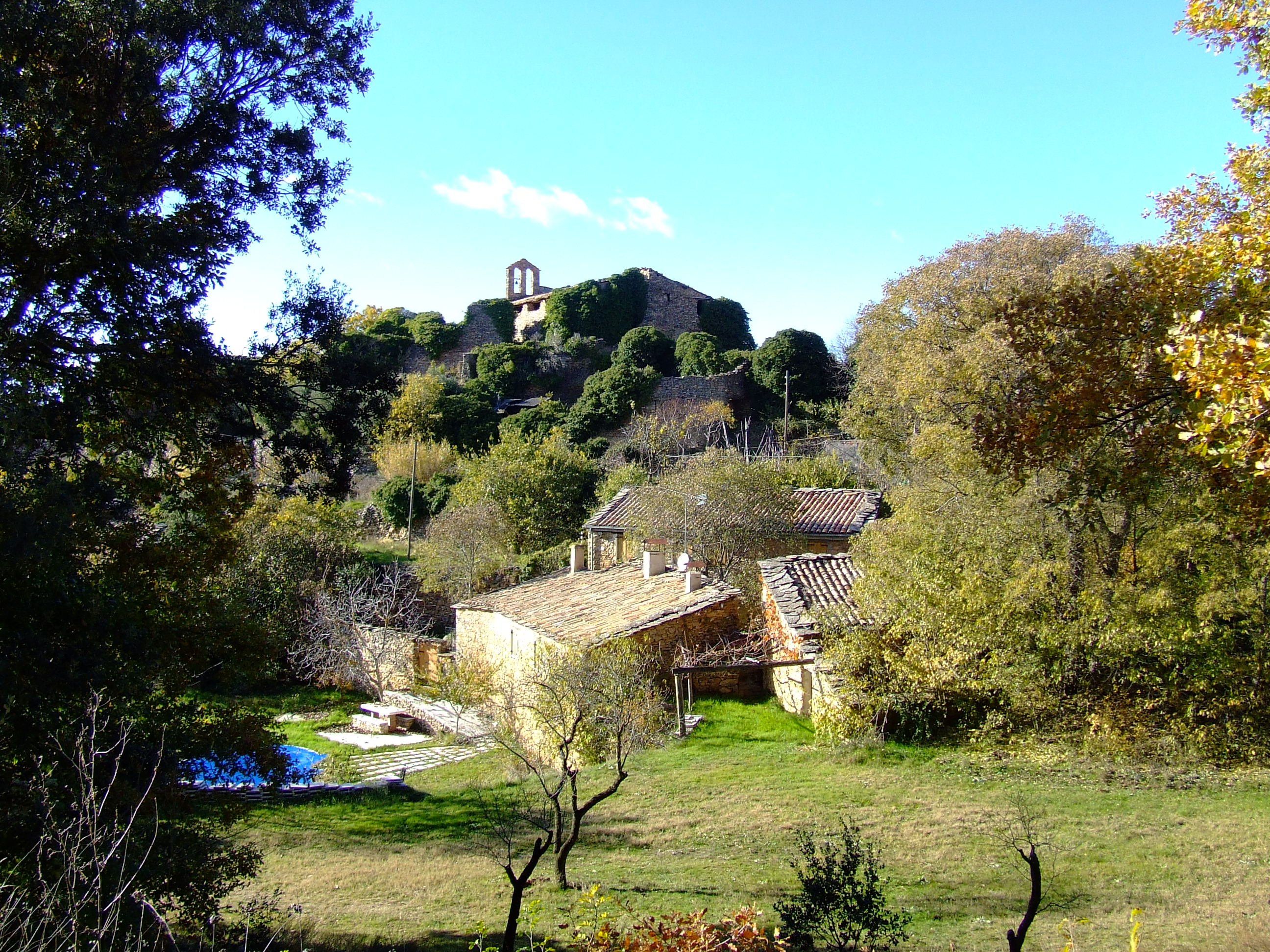

- Location within Province of Lleida Location within Catalonia Location within Spain
- Coordinates: 42°6′47″N 1°4′54″E
- Country: Spain
- Community: Catalonia
- Province: Lleida
- Municipality: Isona i Conca Dellà
- Elevation: 790 m (2,590 ft)

Population
  - Total: 5

Llordà is a hamlet located in the municipality of Isona i Conca Dellà, in Province of Lleida province, Catalonia, Spain. As of 2020, it has a population of 5.

== Geography ==
Llordà is located 92km northeast of Lleida.
