= Escarlà =

- Locality
- Location within Province of Lleida Location within Catalonia Location within Spain
- Coordinates: 42°13′8″N 0°43′33″E
- Country: Spain
- Community: Catalonia
- Province: Lleida
- Municipality: Tremp
- Elevation: 792 m (2,598 ft)

Population
  - Total: 5

Escarlà is a locality located in the municipality of Tremp, in Province of Lleida province, Catalonia, Spain. As of 2020, it has a population of 5.

== Geography ==
Escarlà is located 106km north of Lleida.
