= El Castellet =

- Locality
- Location within Province of Lleida Location within Catalonia Location within Spain
- Coordinates: 42°16′27″N 0°49′35″E
- Country: Spain
- Community: Catalonia
- Province: Lleida
- Municipality: Tremp
- Elevation: 1,096 m (3,596 ft)

Population
  - Total: 12

El Castellet is a hamlet located in the municipality of Tremp, in Province of Lleida province, Catalonia, Spain. As of 2020, it has a population of 12.

== Geography ==
El Castellet is located 111km north-northeast of Lleida.
