= Els Masos de Sant Martí =

- Locality
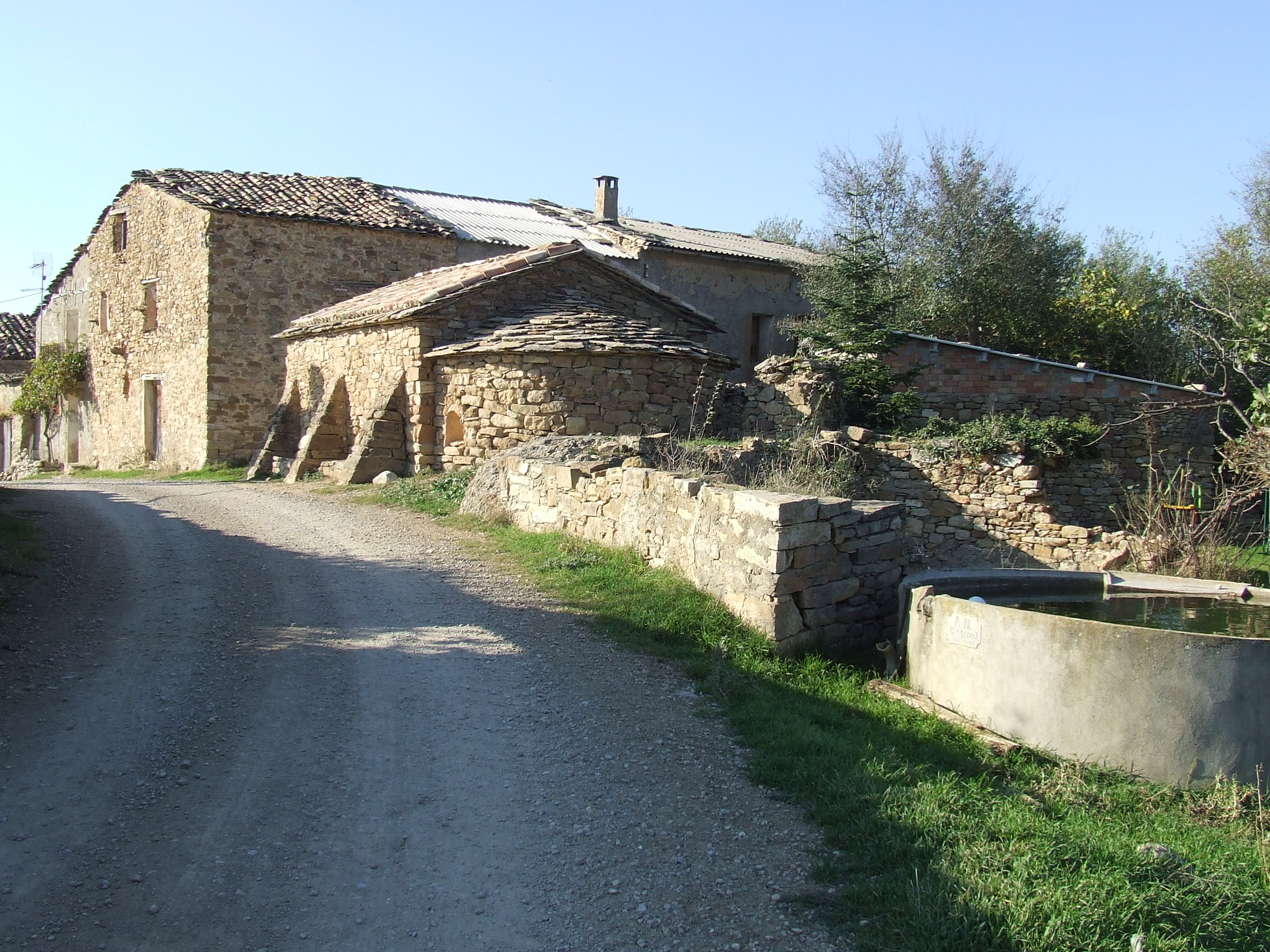

- Location within Province of Lleida Location within Catalonia Location within Spain
- Coordinates: 42°5′54″N 1°3′59″E
- Country: Spain
- Community: Catalonia
- Province: Lleida
- Municipality: Isona i Conca Dellà
- Elevation: 656 m (2,152 ft)

Population
  - Total: 0

Els Masos de Sant Martí is a hamlet located in the municipality of Isona i Conca Dellà, in Province of Lleida province, Catalonia, Spain. As of 2020, it has a population of 0.

== Geography ==
Els Masos de Sant Martí is located 91km northeast of Lleida.
