= Suterranya =

- Locality
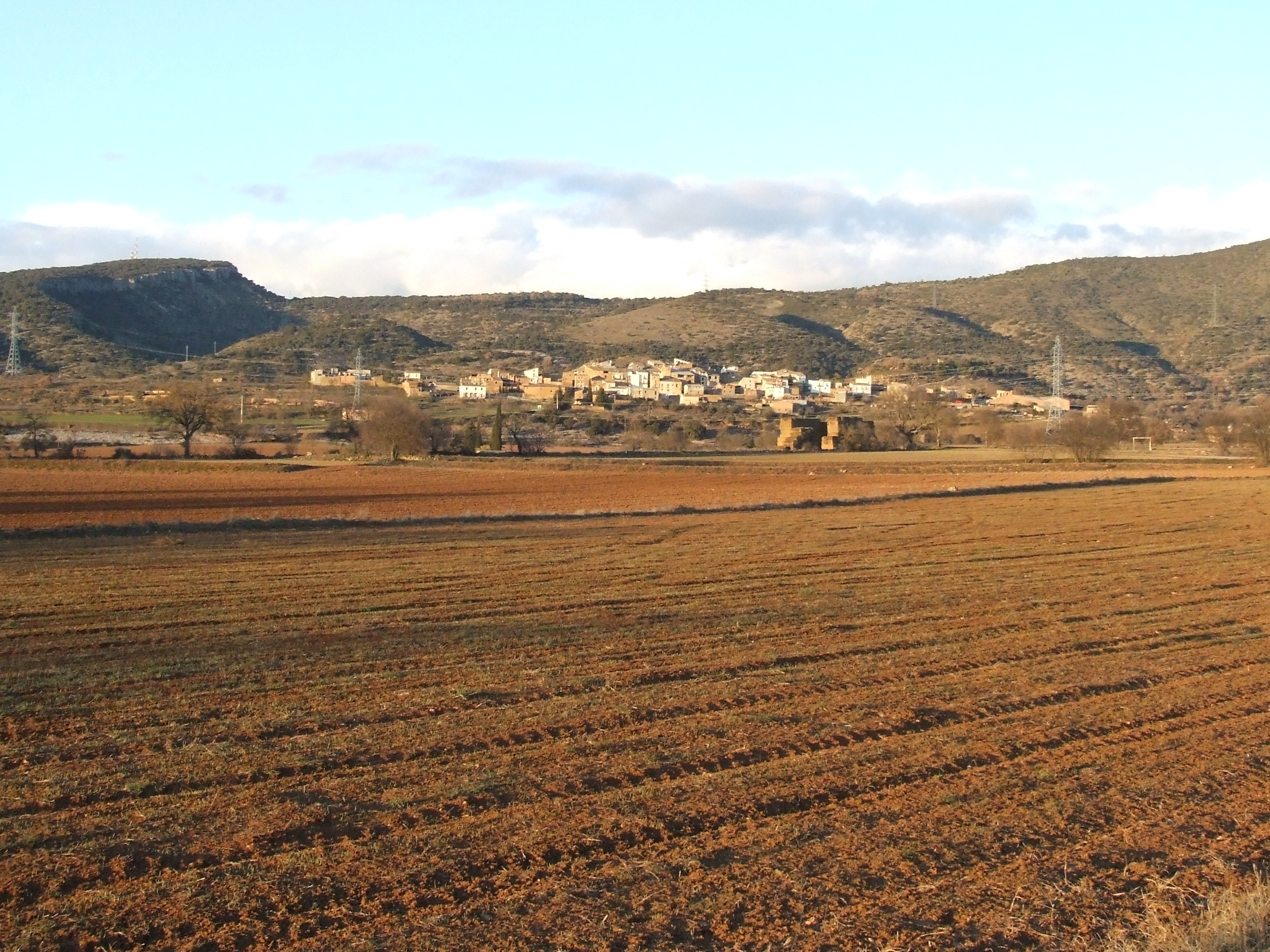

- Location within Province of Lleida Location within Catalonia Location within Spain
- Coordinates: 42°9′9″N 0°57′1″E
- Country: Spain
- Community: Catalonia
- Province: Lleida
- Municipality: Tremp
- Elevation: 561 m (1,841 ft)

Population
  - Total: 50

Suterranya is a locality located in the municipality of Tremp, in Province of Lleida province, Catalonia, Spain. As of 2020, it has a population of 50.

== Geography ==
Suterranya is located 99km north-northeast of Lleida.
