= Castissent =

- Locality
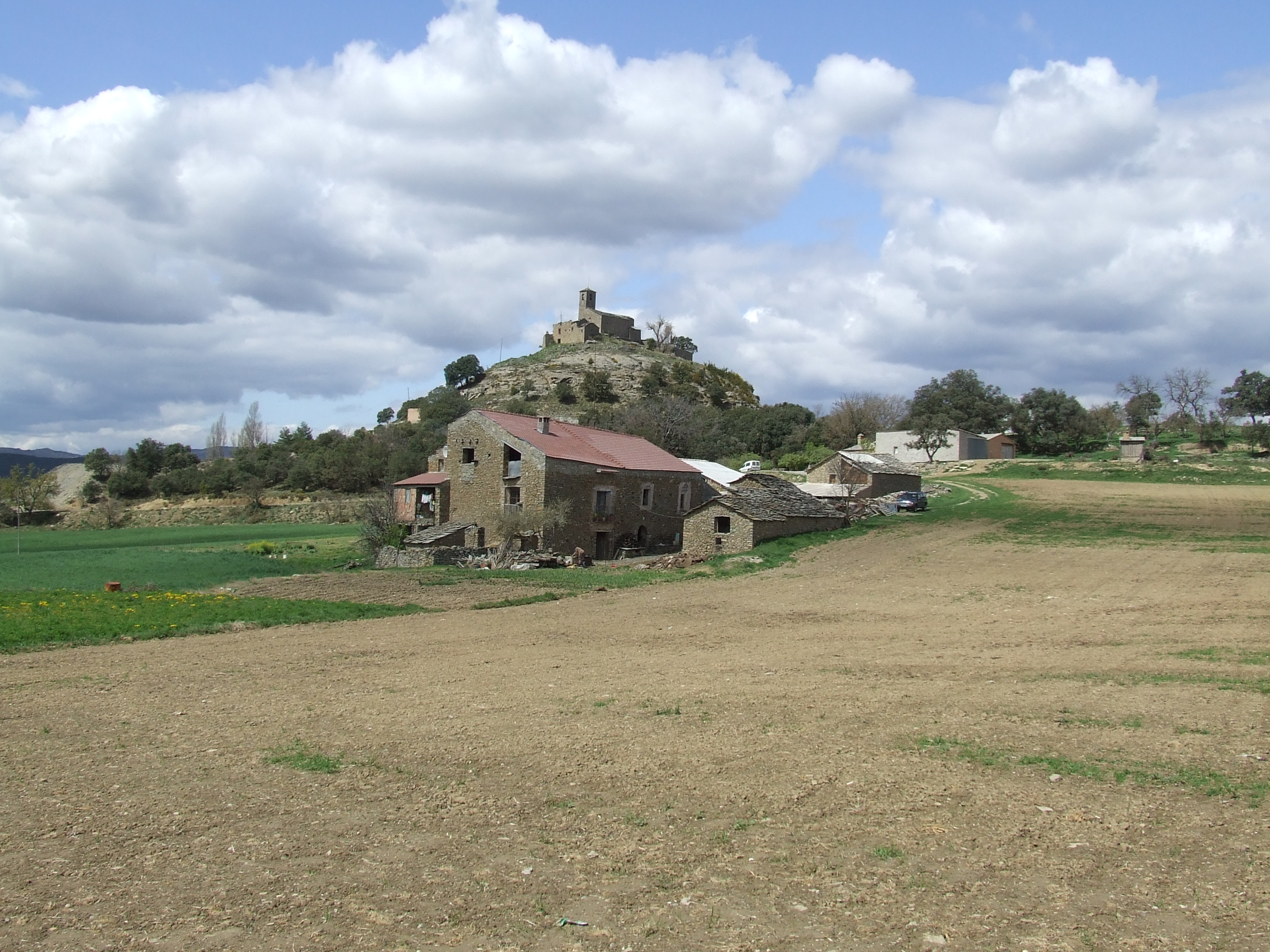

- Location within Province of Lleida Location within Catalonia Location within Spain
- Coordinates: 42°7′34″N 0°42′36″E
- Country: Spain
- Community: Catalonia
- Province: Lleida
- Municipality: Tremp
- Elevation: 658 m (2,159 ft)

Population
  - Total: 18

Castissent is a hamlet located in the municipality of Tremp, in Province of Lleida province, Catalonia, Spain. As of 2020, it has a population of 18.

== Geography ==
Castissent is located 93km north of Lleida.
