= Espluga Freda =

- Locality
- Esplugafreda
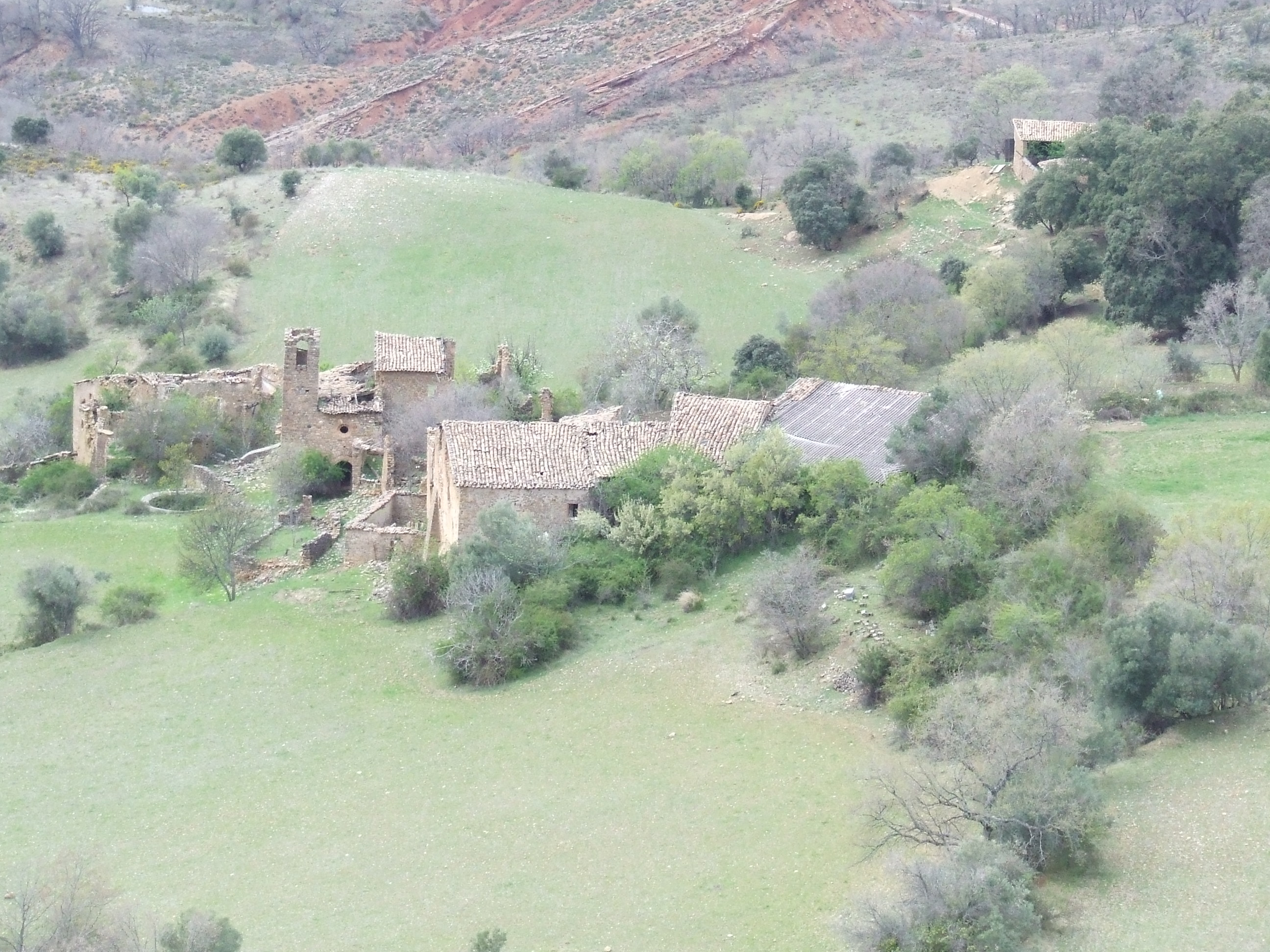

- Location within Province of Lleida Location within Catalonia Location within Spain
- Coordinates: 42°14′32″N 0°47′0″E
- Country: Spain
- Community: Catalonia
- Province: Lleida
- Municipality: Tremp
- Elevation: 877 m (2,877 ft)

Population
  - Total: 0

Espluga Freda or Esplugafreda is a locality located in the municipality of Tremp, in Province of Lleida province, Catalonia, Spain. As of 2020, it has a population of 0.

== Geography ==
Espluga Freda is located 105 km north-northeast of Lleida.
