= Siall =

- Locality
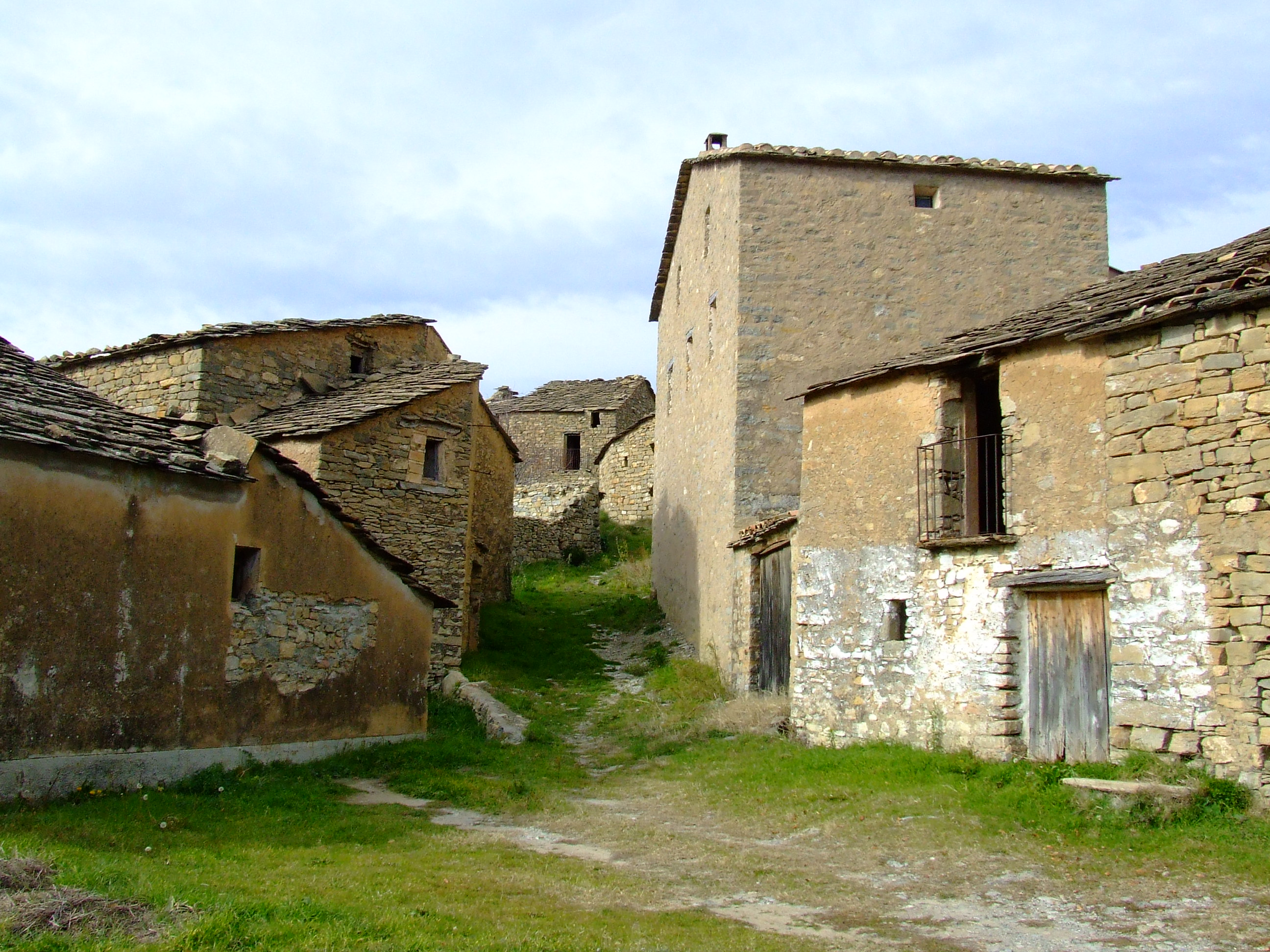

- Location within Province of Lleida Location within Catalonia Location within Spain
- Coordinates: 42°7′43″N 1°6′43″E
- Country: Spain
- Community: Catalonia
- Province: Lleida
- Municipality: Isona i Conca Dellà
- Elevation: 1,104 m (3,622 ft)

Population
  - Total: 5

Siall is a hamlet located in the municipality of Isona i Conca Dellà, in Province of Lleida province, Catalonia, Spain. As of 2020, it has a population of 5.

== Geography ==
Siall is located 103km northeast of Lleida.
