= Espills =

- Locality
- Location within Province of Lleida Location within Catalonia Location within Spain
- Coordinates: 42°12′32″N 0°45′22″E
- Country: Spain
- Community: Catalonia
- Province: Lleida
- Municipality: Tremp
- Elevation: 1,064 m (3,491 ft)

Population
  - Total: 11

Espills is a locality located in the municipality of Tremp, in Province of Lleida province, Catalonia, Spain. As of 2020, it has a population of 11.

== Geography ==
Espills is located 99km north-northeast of Lleida.
