= Benavent de la Conca =

- Locality
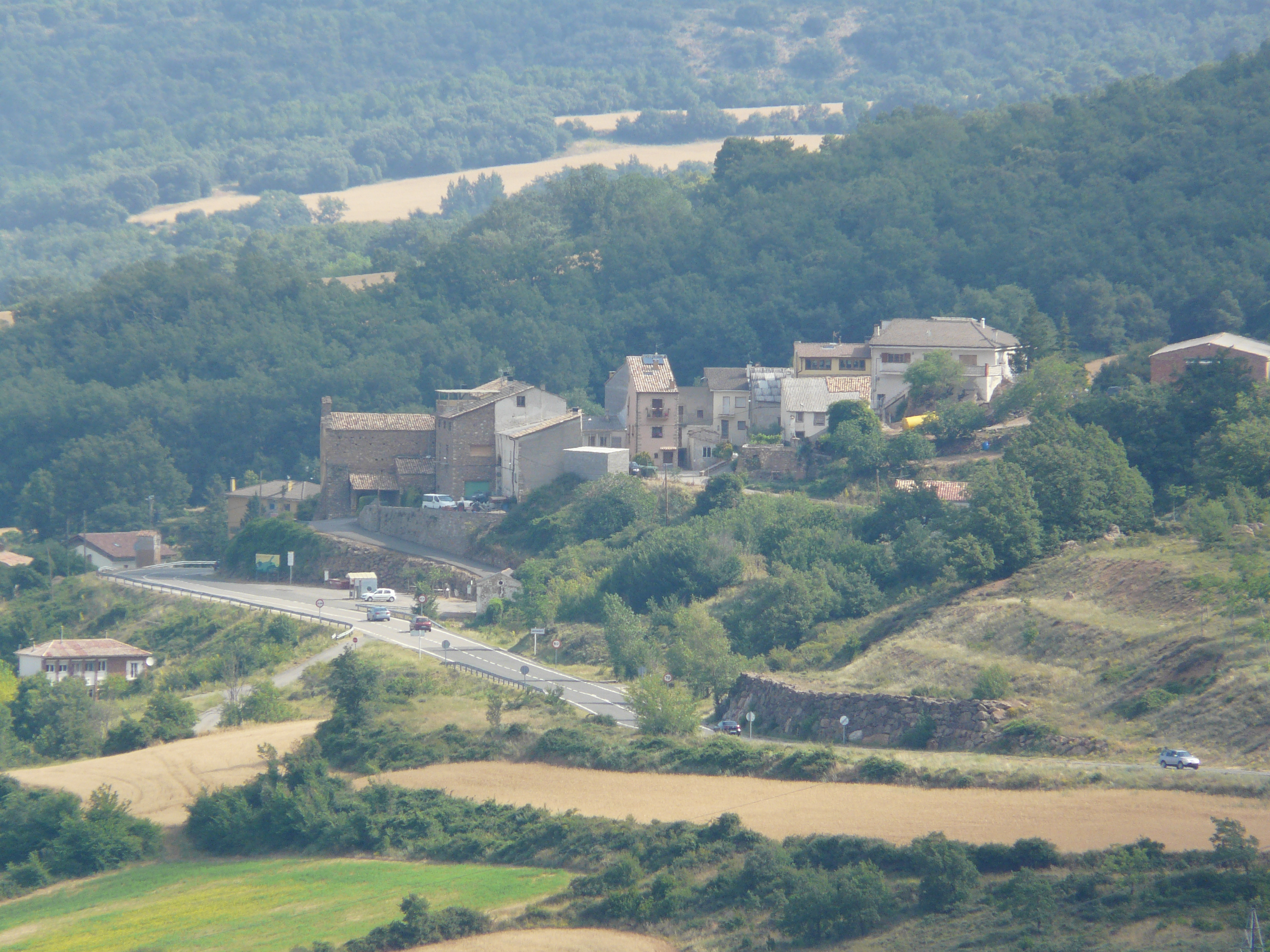

- Location within Province of Lleida Location within Catalonia Location within Spain
- Coordinates: 42°4′23″N 1°5′48″E
- Country: Spain
- Community: Catalonia
- Province: Lleida
- Municipality: Isona i Conca Dellà
- Elevation: 1,011 m (3,317 ft)

Population
  - Total: 25

Benavent de la Conca is a locality located in the municipality of Isona i Conca Dellà, in Province of Lleida province, Catalonia, Spain. As of 2020, it has a population of 25.

== Geography ==
Benavent de la Conca is located 85km northeast of Lleida.
