= Covet (Isona i Conca Dellà) =

- Locality
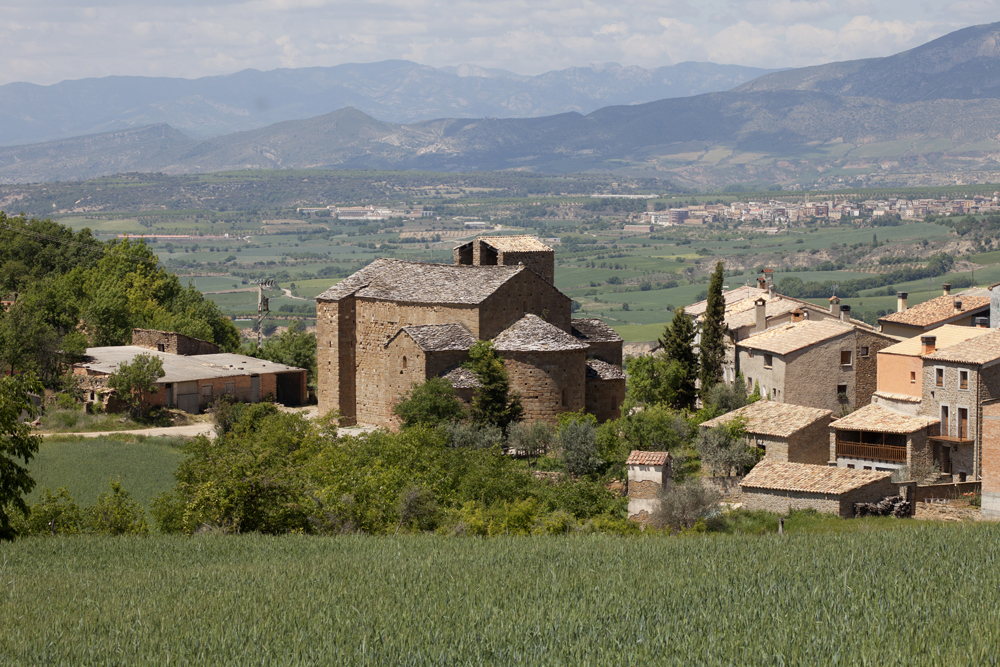

- Location within Province of Lleida Location within Catalonia Location within Spain
- Coordinates: 42°5′12″N 1°4′13″E
- Country: Spain
- Community: Catalonia
- Province: Lleida
- Municipality: Isona i Conca Dellà
- Elevation: 718 m (2,356 ft)

Population
  - Total: 8

Covet is a hamlet located in the municipality of Isona i Conca Dellà, in Province of Lleida province, Catalonia, Spain. As of 2020, it has a population of 8.

== Geography ==
Covet is located 89km northeast of Lleida.
