= Puigverd (Tremp) =

- Locality
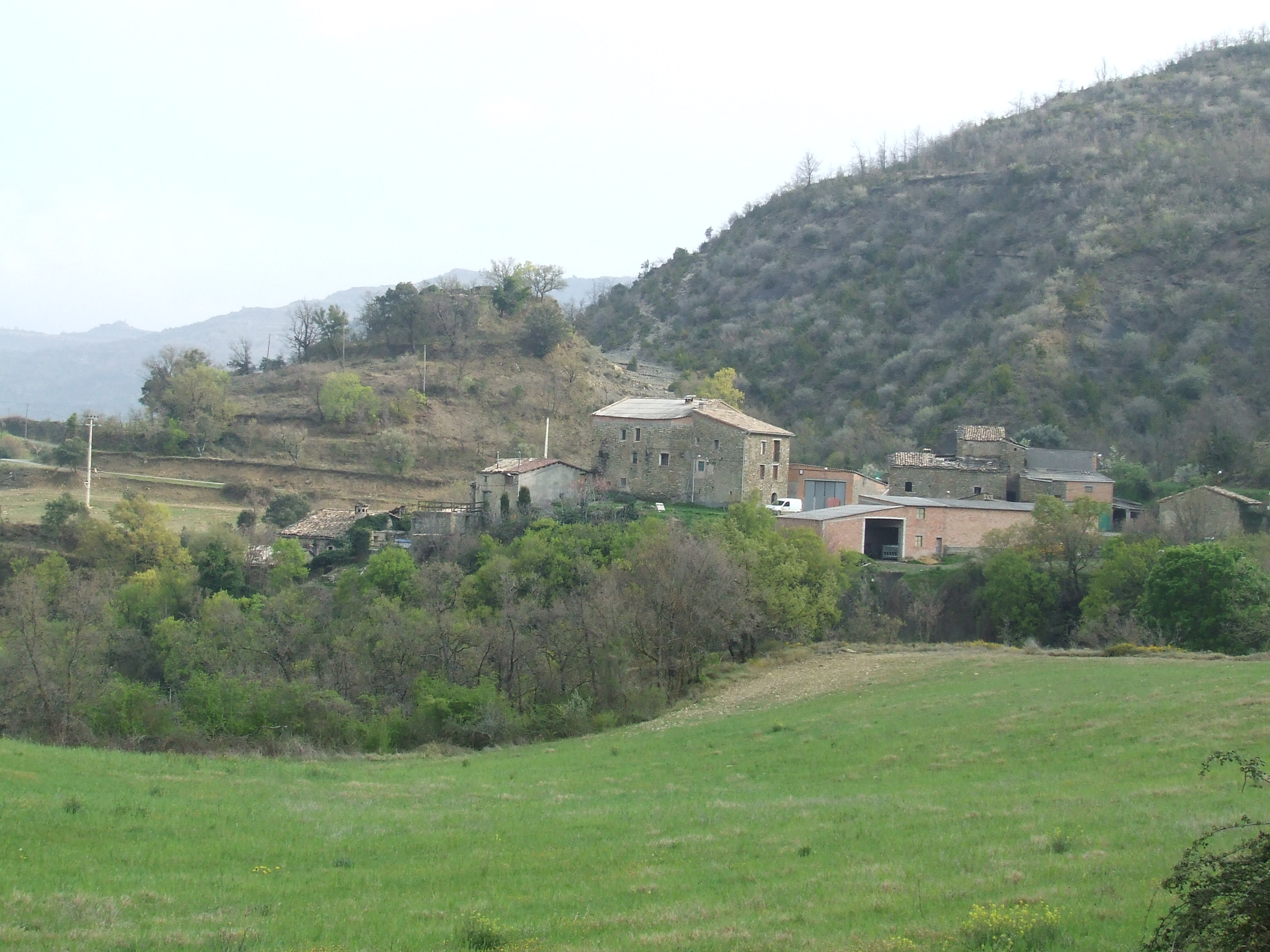

- Location within Province of Lleida Location within Catalonia Location within Spain
- Coordinates: 42°8′34″N 0°48′49″E
- Country: Spain
- Community: Catalonia
- Province: Lleida
- Municipality: Tremp
- Elevation: 723 m (2,372 ft)

Population
  - Total: 2

Puigverd is a locality located in the municipality of Tremp, in Province of Lleida province, Catalonia, Spain. As of 2020, it has a population of 2.

== Geography ==
Puigverd is located 104km north-northeast of Lleida.
