= Talarn Dam =

Concrete gravity dam on the Noguera Pallaresa River in Catalonia, Spain

Coordinates: 42°10′46.87″N 0°54′47.30″E

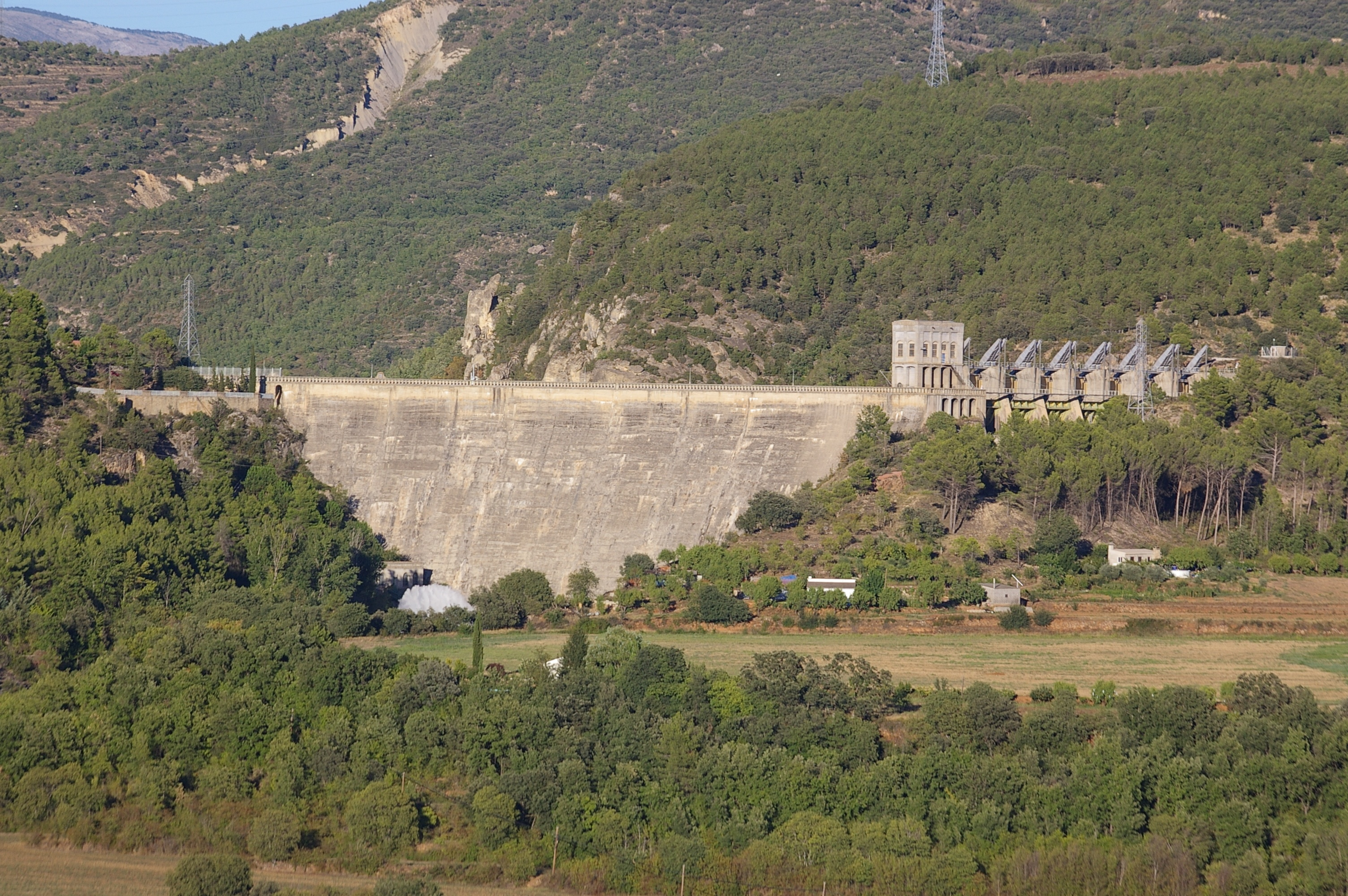
- Interactive map of Talarn Dam
- Country: Spain
- Status: Operational
- Construction began: 1913
- Opening date: 1916

Dam and spillways
- Type of dam: Gravity dam
- Impounds: Noguera Pallaresa River
- Height (foundation): 86

Talarn Dam (Catalan: embassament de Sant Antoni), also referred to as the Sant Antoni Dam, is a concrete gravity dam on the Noguera Pallaresa River, a tributary of the Ebro River, north of Tremp near Lleida in Catalonia, Spain. The dam is 206 meters long and 82 meters high and supplies a hydro-electric station with an output of 30 MW.

Construction of the dam lasted from 1911 to 1916. It was a huge undertaking needing ten million cubic feet of concrete. It was part of a larger project to build dams to store water in reservoirs to feed powerplants and to provide irrigation for farming.

Construction of the hydroelectric power station lasted from 1914 to 1917. It was built by Riegos y Fuerza del Ebro, a subsidiary of La Canadenca, on the Susterris strait where the Sant Antoni hermitage was located.

In 2025, the archaeology department of the University of Barcelona started to prospect the area to study the remains of the camps of the workers who built the dam.

== See also ==
- Gravity dam
- List of dams and reservoirs in Catalonia
