= Santa Engràcia =

- Locality
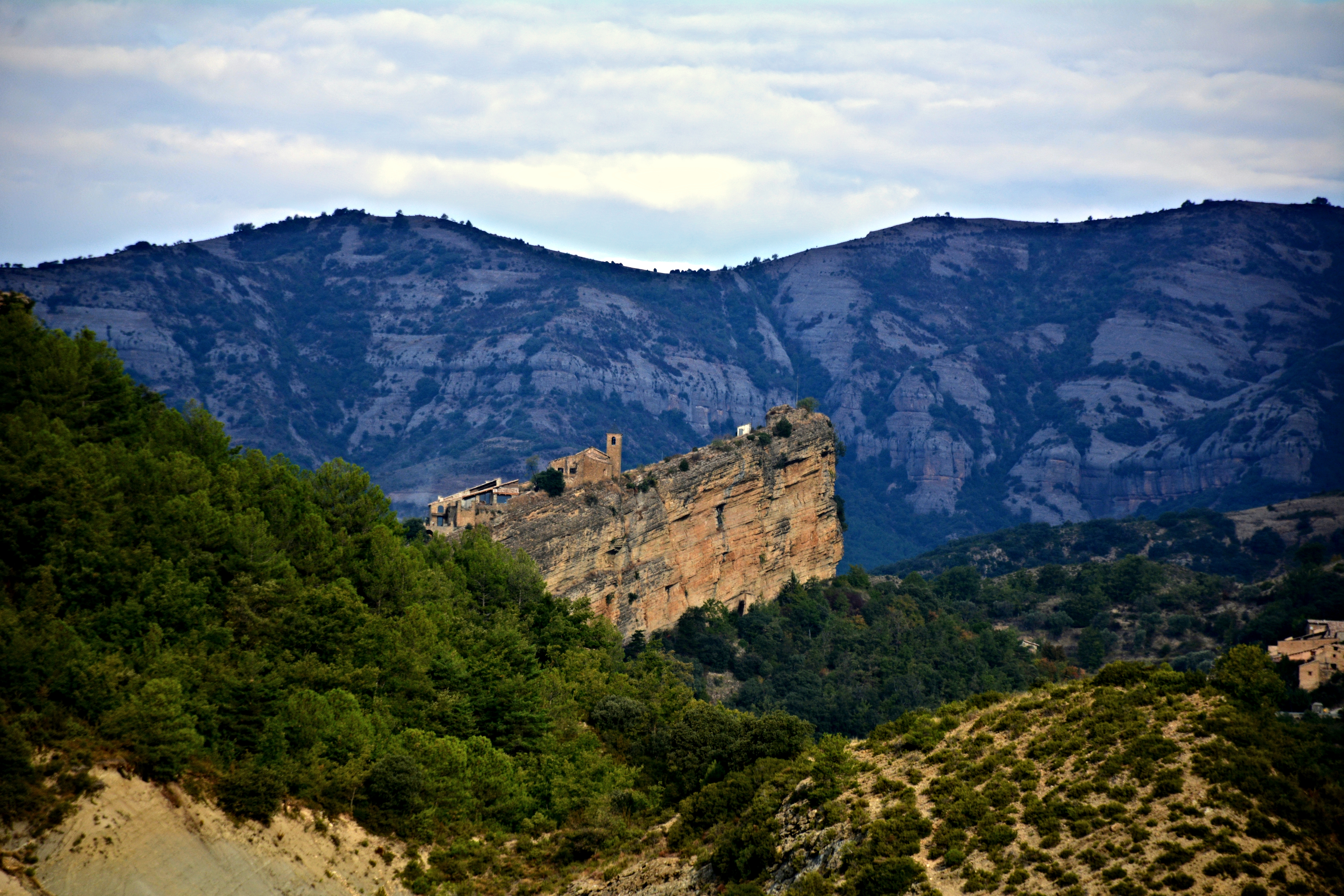

- Location within Province of Lleida Location within Catalonia Location within Spain
- Coordinates: 42°13′20″N 0°52′25″E
- Country: Spain
- Community: Catalonia
- Province: Lleida
- Municipality: Tremp
- Elevation: 1,012 m (3,320 ft)

Population
  - Total: 13

Santa Engràcia is a hamlet located in the municipality of Tremp, in Province of Lleida province, Catalonia, Spain. As of 2020, it has a population of 13.

== Geography ==
Santa Engràcia is located 104km north-northeast of Lleida.
