= Tendrui =

- Locality
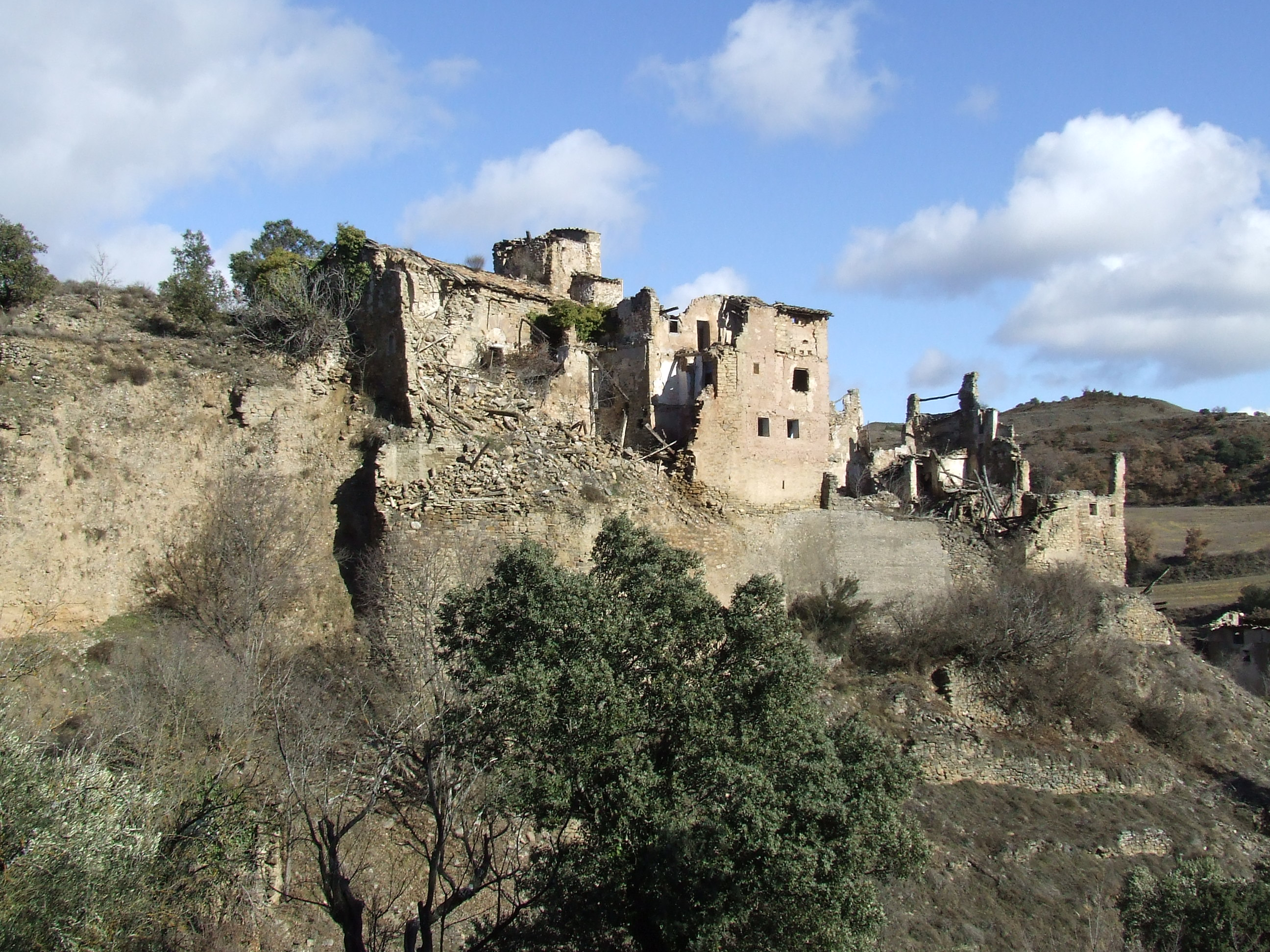

- Location within Province of Lleida Location within Catalonia Location within Spain
- Coordinates: 42°10′32″N 0°50′57″E
- Country: Spain
- Community: Catalonia
- Province: Lleida
- Municipality: Tremp
- Elevation: 652 m (2,139 ft)

Population
  - Total: 7

Tendrui is a hamlet located in the municipality of Tremp, in Province of Lleida province, Catalonia, Spain. As of 2020, it has a population of 7.

== Geography ==
Tendrui is located 96km north-northeast of Lleida.
