= Els Masos de Tamúrcia =

- Locality
- Location within Province of Lleida Location within Catalonia Location within Spain
- Coordinates: 42°16′51″N 0°45′38″E
- Country: Spain
- Community: Catalonia
- Province: Lleida
- Municipality: Tremp
- Elevation: 1,004 m (3,294 ft)

Population
  - Total: 10

Els Masos de Tamúrcia is a hamlet located in the municipality of Tremp, in Province of Lleida province, Catalonia, Spain. As of 2020, it has a population of 10.

== Geography ==
Els Masos de Tamúrcia is located 107km north of Lleida.
