= Gurp (Tremp) =

- Locality
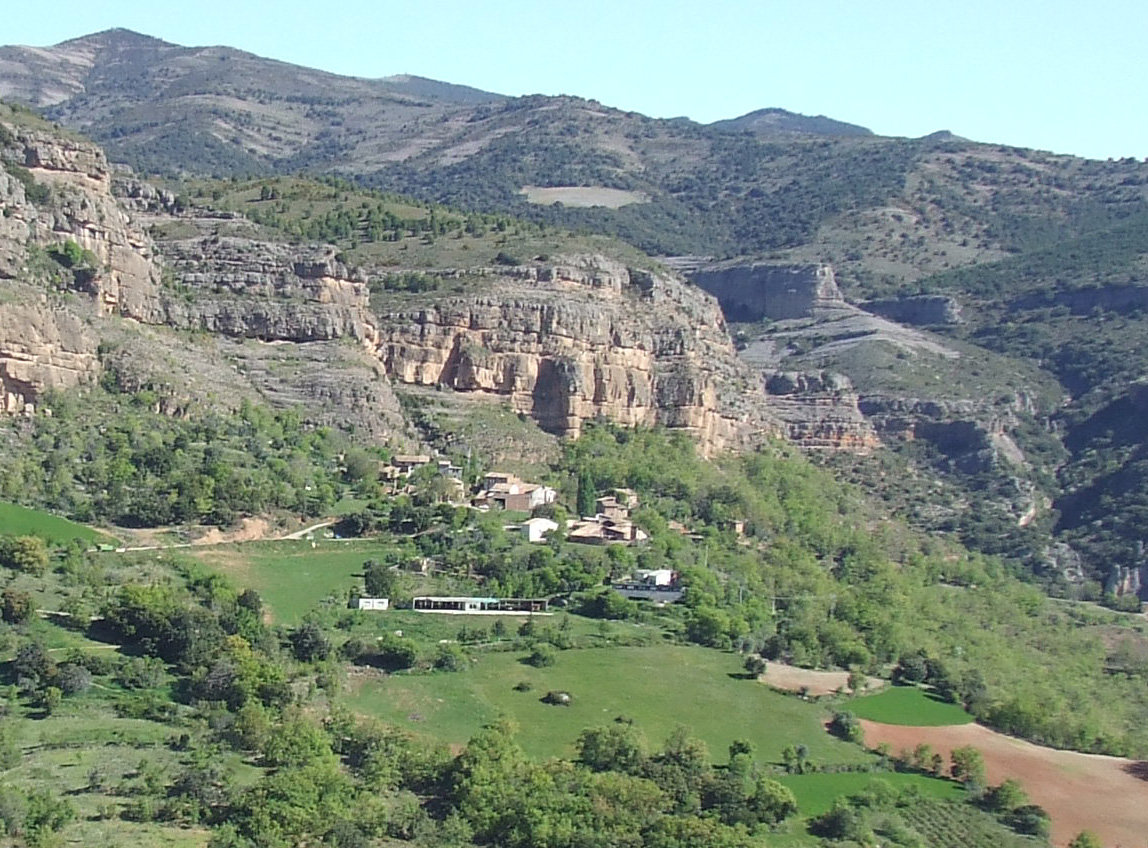

- Location within Province of Lleida Location within Catalonia Location within Spain
- Coordinates: 42°13′25″N 0°50′53″E
- Country: Spain
- Community: Catalonia
- Province: Lleida
- Municipality: Tremp
- Elevation: 908 m (2,979 ft)

Population
  - Total: 20

Gurp is a hamlet located in the municipality of Tremp, in Province of Lleida province, Catalonia, Spain. As of 2020, it has a population of 20.

== Geography ==
Gurp is located 102km north-northeast of Lleida.
