= Conques (Isona i Conca Dellà) =

- Locality
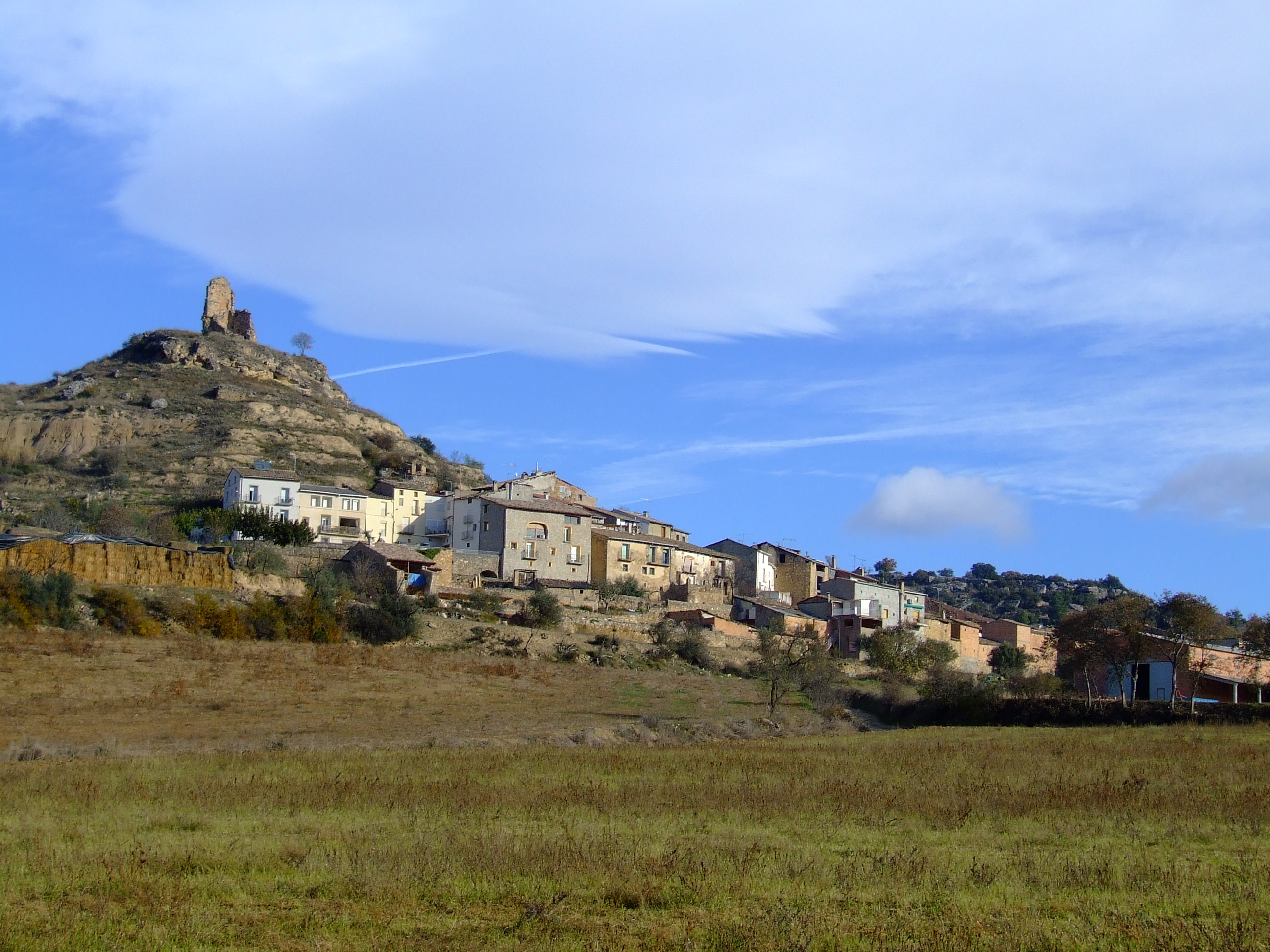

- Location within Province of Lleida Location within Catalonia Location within Spain
- Coordinates: 42°7′9″N 1°0′45″E
- Country: Spain
- Community: Catalonia
- Province: Lleida
- Municipality: Isona i Conca Dellà
- Elevation: 584 m (1,916 ft)

Population
  - Total: 113

Conques is a locality located in the municipality of Isona i Conca Dellà, in Province of Lleida province, Catalonia, Spain. As of 2020, it has a population of 113.

== Geography ==
Conques is located 98 kilometres (61 mi) north-northeast of Lleida.
