= Sant Adrià (Tremp) =

- Locality
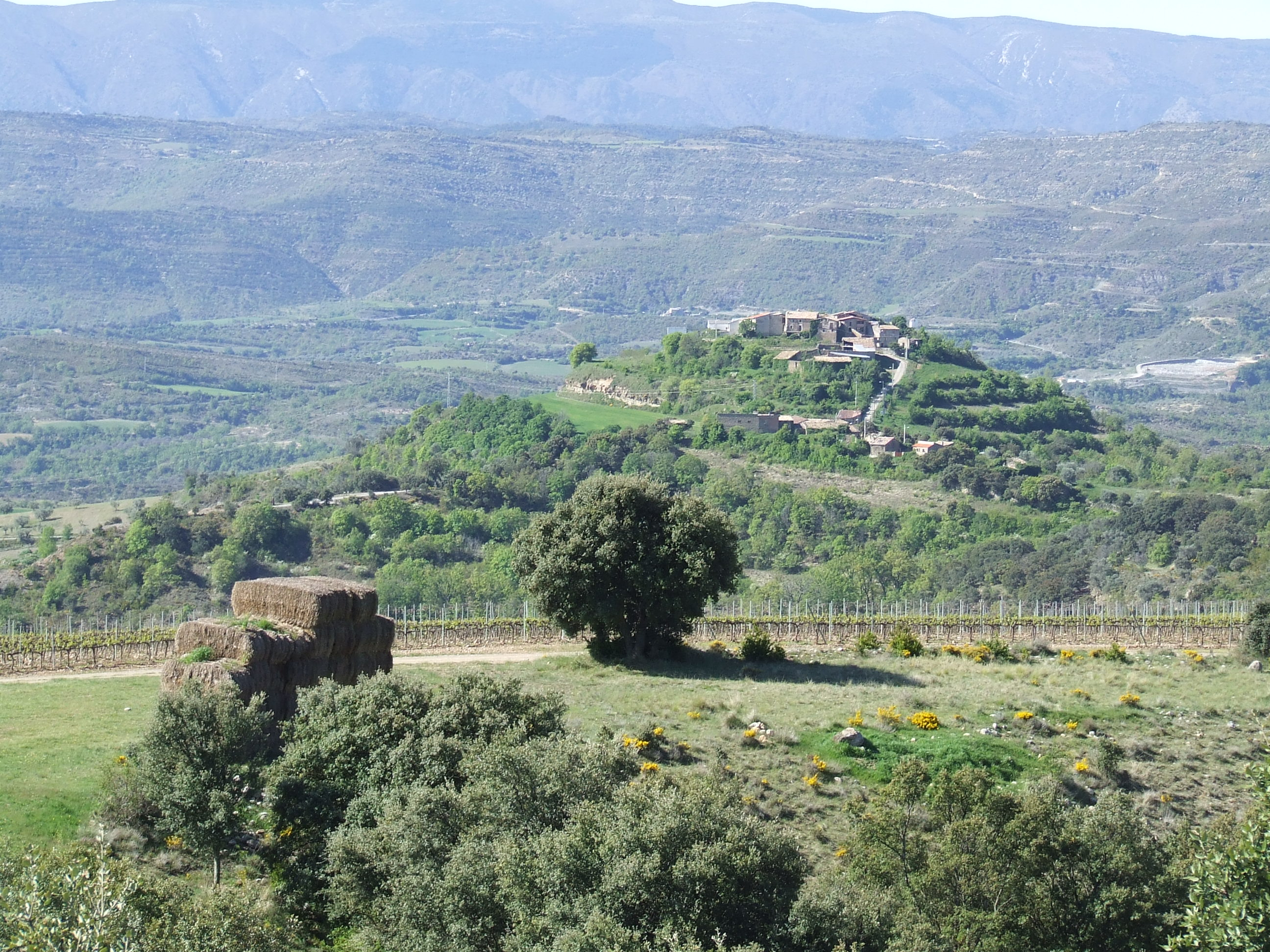

- Location within Province of Lleida Location within Catalonia Location within Spain
- Coordinates: 42°11′14″N 0°50′1″E
- Country: Spain
- Community: Catalonia
- Province: Lleida
- Municipality: Tremp
- Elevation: 862 m (2,828 ft)

Population
  - Total: 5

Sant Adrià is a locality located in the municipality of Tremp, in Province of Lleida province, Catalonia, Spain. As of 2024, it has a population of 5.

== Geography ==
Sant Adrià is located 100km north-northeast of Lleida.
