= Gramenet =

- Locality
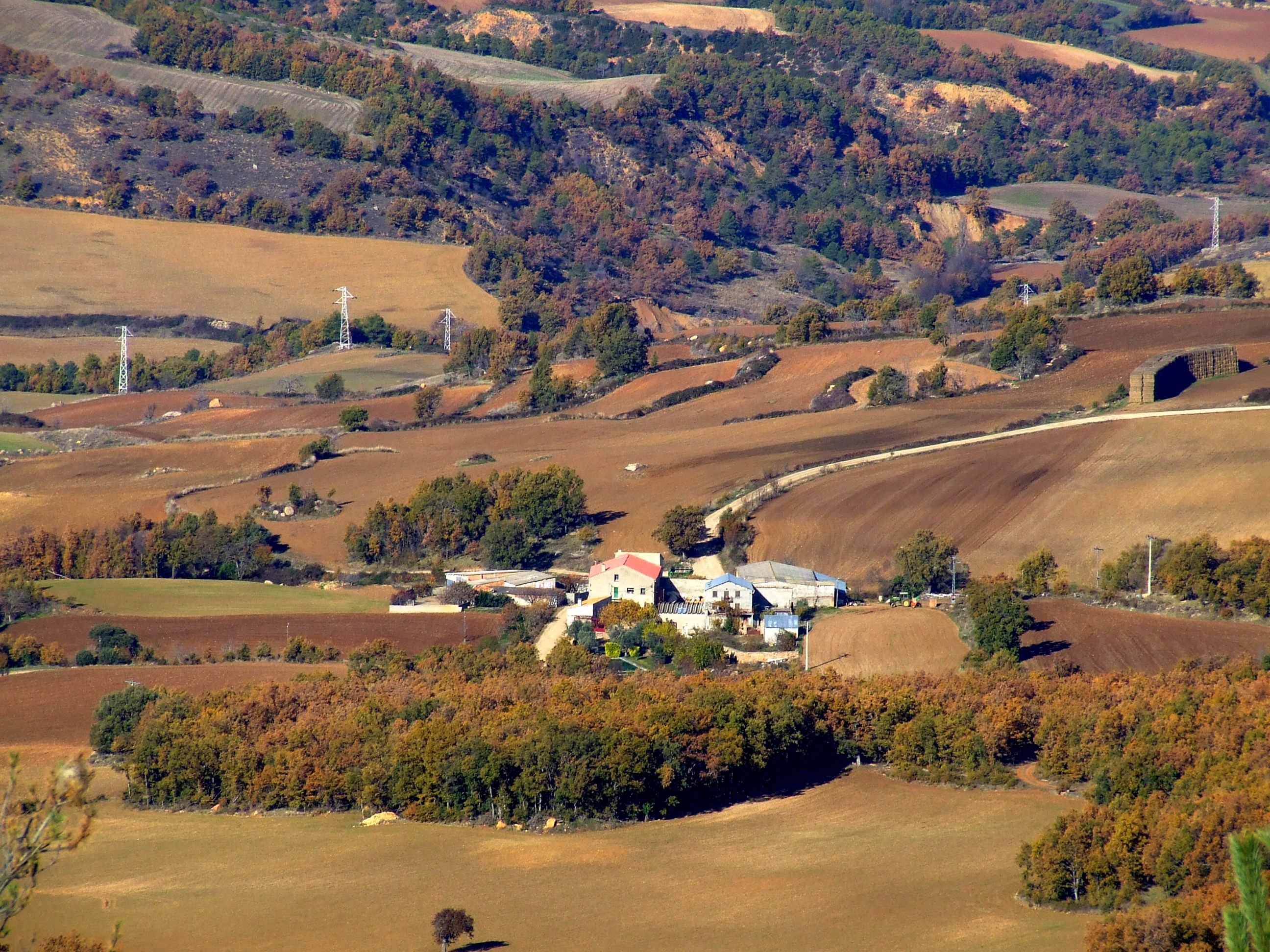

- Location within Province of Lleida Location within Catalonia Location within Spain
- Coordinates: 42°4′20″N 1°4′18″E
- Country: Spain
- Community: Catalonia
- Province: Lleida
- Municipality: Isona i Conca Dellà
- Elevation: 733 m (2,405 ft)

Population
  - Total: 1

Gramenet is a hamlet located in the municipality of Isona i Conca Dellà, in Province of Lleida province, Catalonia, Spain. As of 2020, it has a population of 1.

== Geography ==
Gramenet is located 90km northeast of Lleida.
