= Orcau =

- Locality
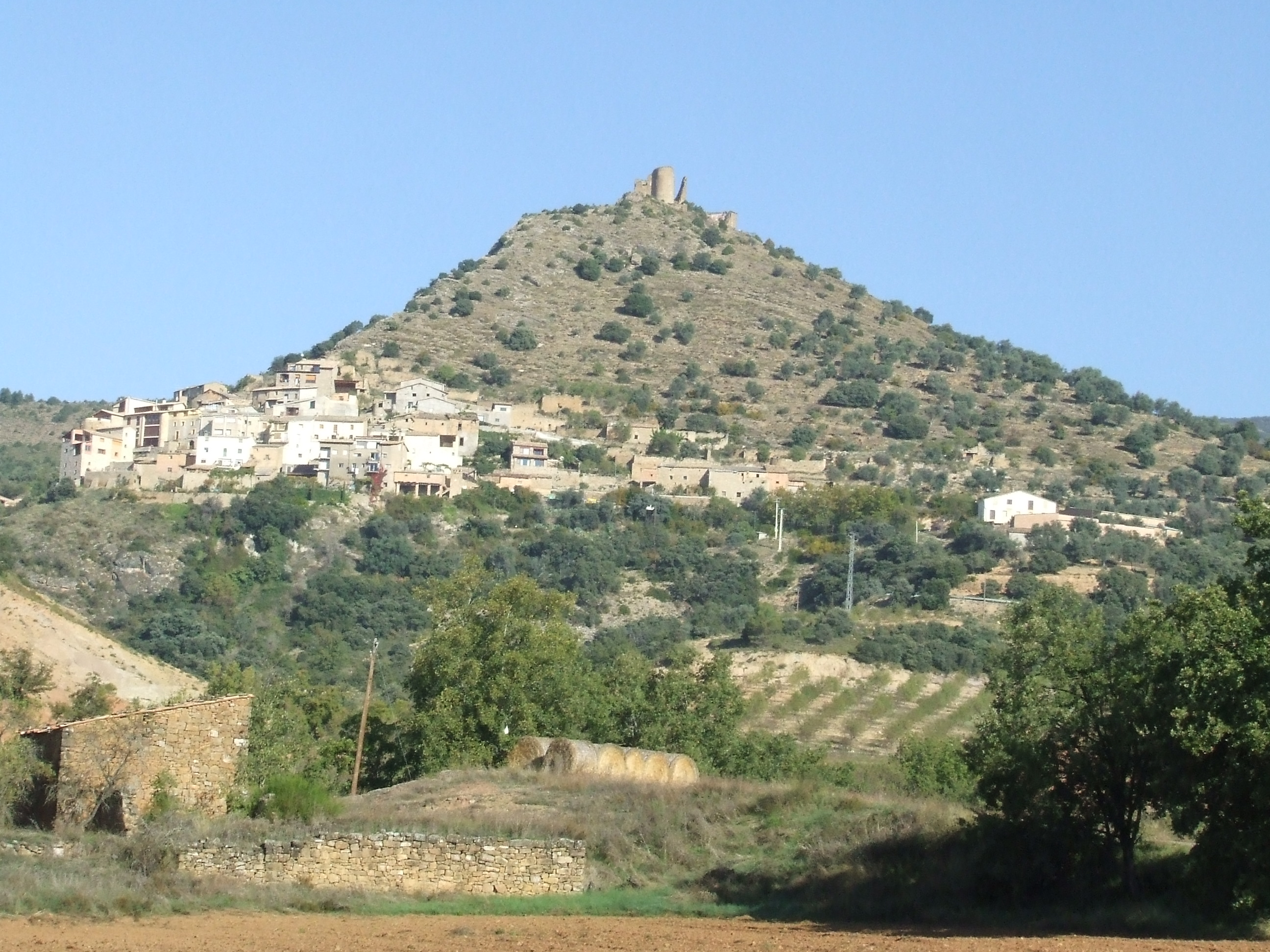

- Location within Province of Lleida Location within Catalonia Location within Spain
- Coordinates: 42°9′47″N 0°58′56″E
- Country: Spain
- Community: Catalonia
- Province: Lleida
- Municipality: Isona i Conca Dellà
- Elevation: 751 m (2,464 ft)

Population
  - Total: 19

Orcau is a locality located in the municipality of Isona i Conca Dellà, in Province of Lleida province, Catalonia, Spain. As of 2020, it has a population of 19.

== Geography ==
Orcau is located 106km north-northeast of Lleida.
