= Montadó =

- Locality
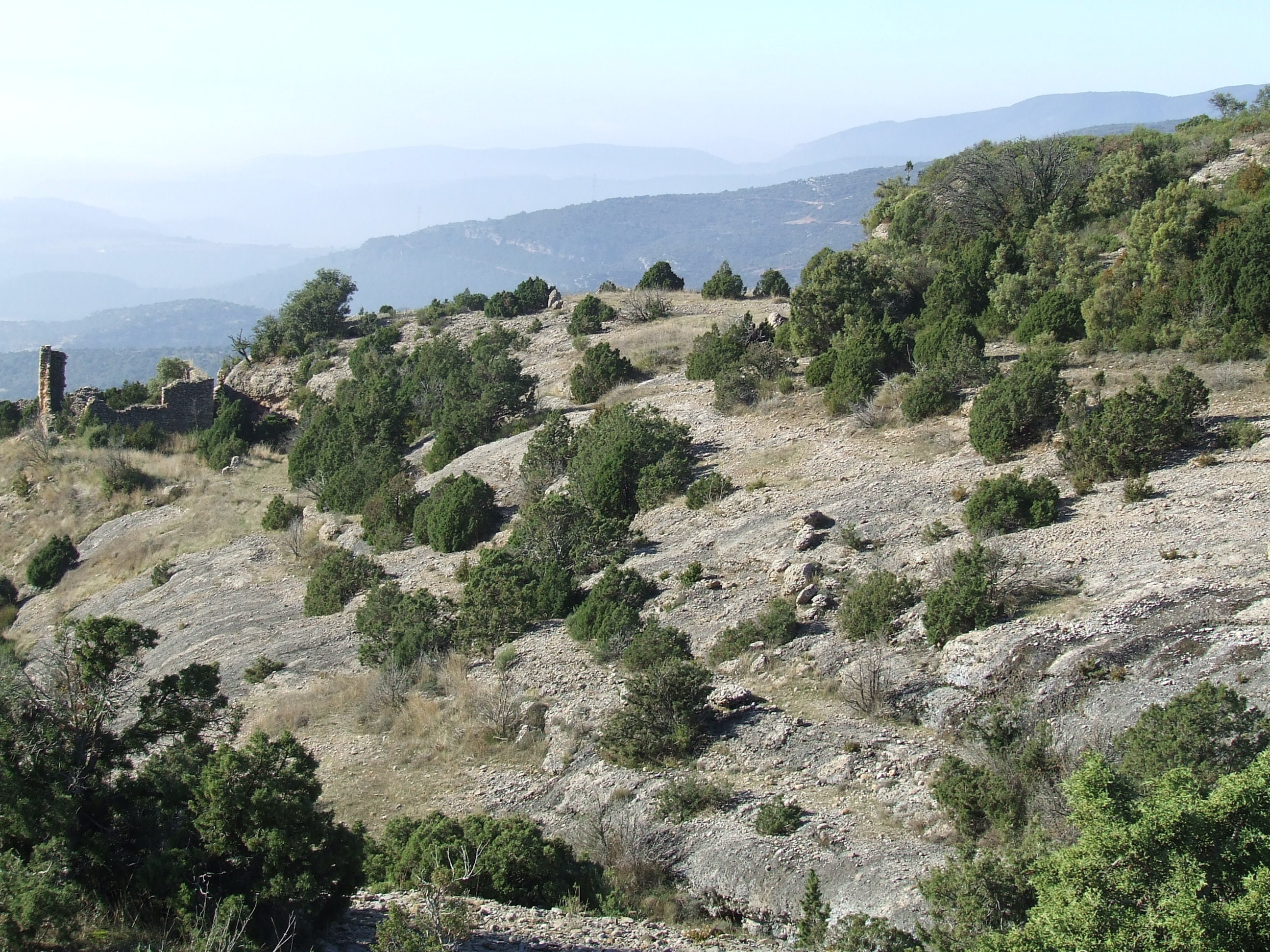

- Location within Province of Lleida Location within Catalonia Location within Spain
- Coordinates: 42°1′2″N 1°4′47″E
- Country: Spain
- Community: Catalonia
- Province: Lleida
- Municipality: Isona i Conca Dellà

Population
  - Total: 1

Montadó is a almost deserted locality located in the municipality of Isona i Conca Dellà, in Province of Lleida province, Catalonia, Spain. As of 2020, it has a population of 1.
