= Vilamitjana =

- Decentralized municipal entity
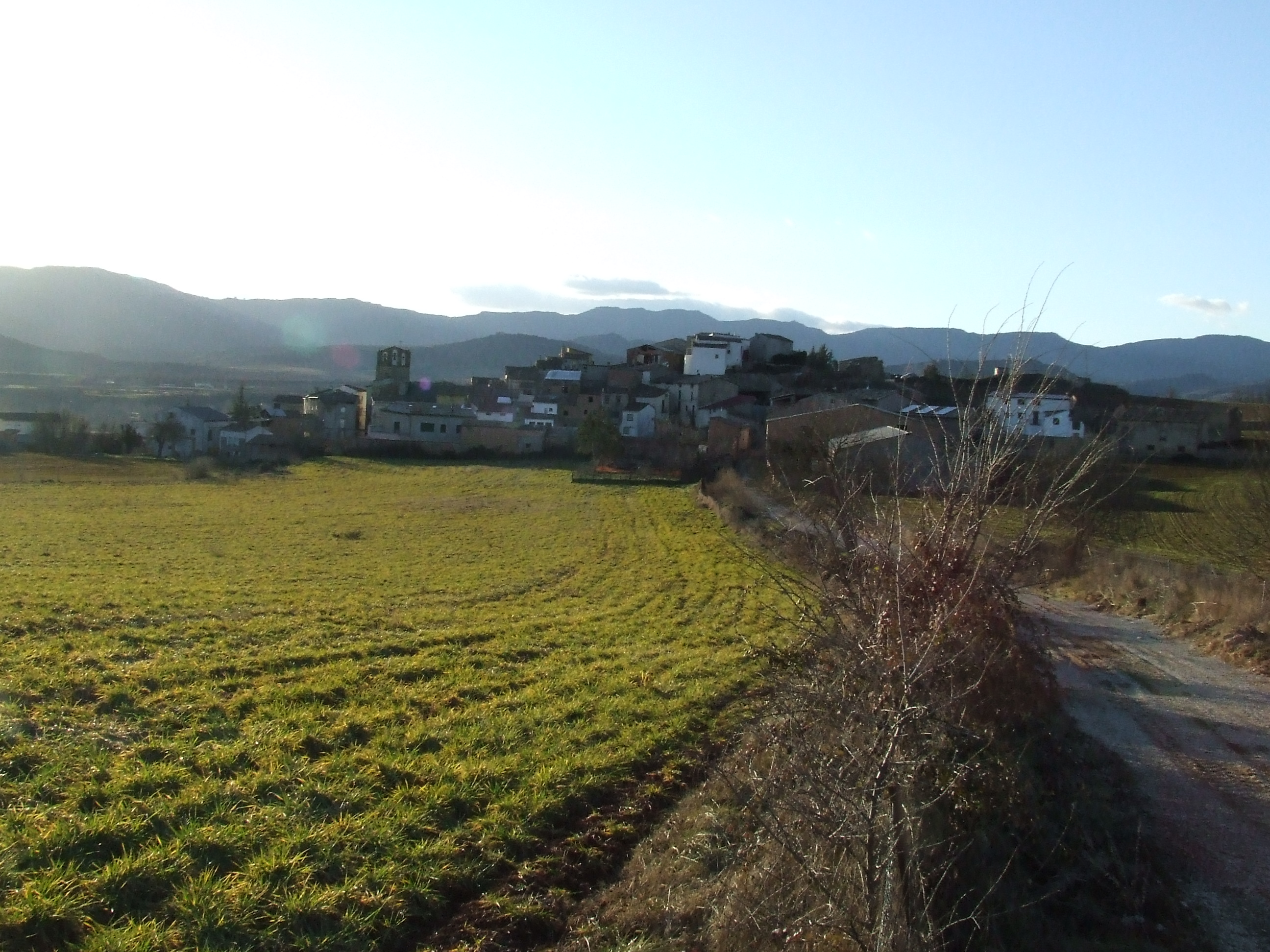

- Location within Province of Lleida Location within Catalonia Location within Spain
- Coordinates: 42°8′48″N 0°55′9″E
- Country: Spain
- Community: Catalonia
- Province: Lleida
- Municipality: Tremp
- Elevation: 447 m (1,467 ft)

Population
  - Total: 162

Vilamitjana is a locality and decentralized municipal entity located in the municipality of Tremp, in Province of Lleida province, Catalonia, Spain. As of 2020, it has a population of 162.

== Geography ==
Vilamitjana is located 95km north-northeast of Lleida.

== Places of interest ==
Vilamitjana is known by the finding of an important paleontological site named: Les Serretes. In this site there have found dinosaur remains that belongs to the Second biggest hadrosaur found in Spain, and the biggest of Catalonia. It was identifyied as Blasisaurus aff. Also there have been found two carnívor dinosaur tooth that belongs to two new dinosaur species morphotypes.

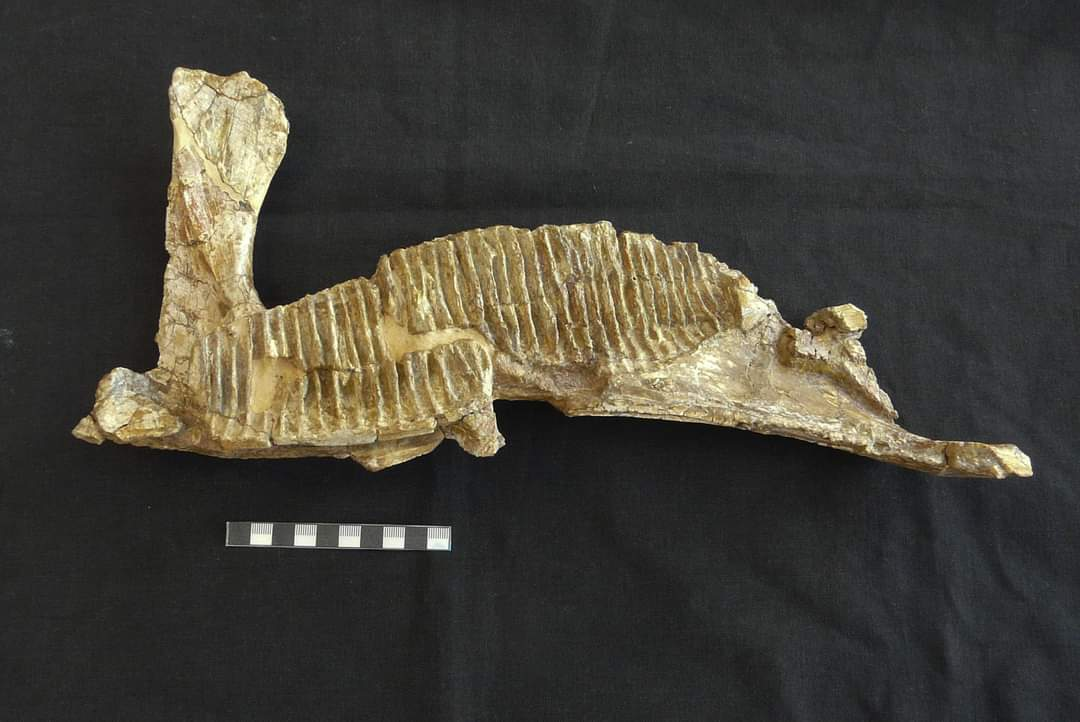

Picture of the dentary from les Serretes. Nowadays exposed on the Museum of Isona.
