= Aulàs =

- Locality
- Location within Province of Lleida Location within Catalonia Location within Spain
- Coordinates: 42°16′27″N 0°48′7″E
- Country: Spain
- Community: Catalonia
- Province: Lleida
- Municipality: Tremp
- Elevation: 919 m (3,015 ft)

Population
  - Total: 47

Aulàs is a hamlet located in the municipality of Tremp, in Province of Lleida province, Catalonia, Spain. As of 2020, it has a population of 47.

== Geography ==
Aulàs is located 110km north-northeast of Lleida.
