= Biscarri =

- Locality
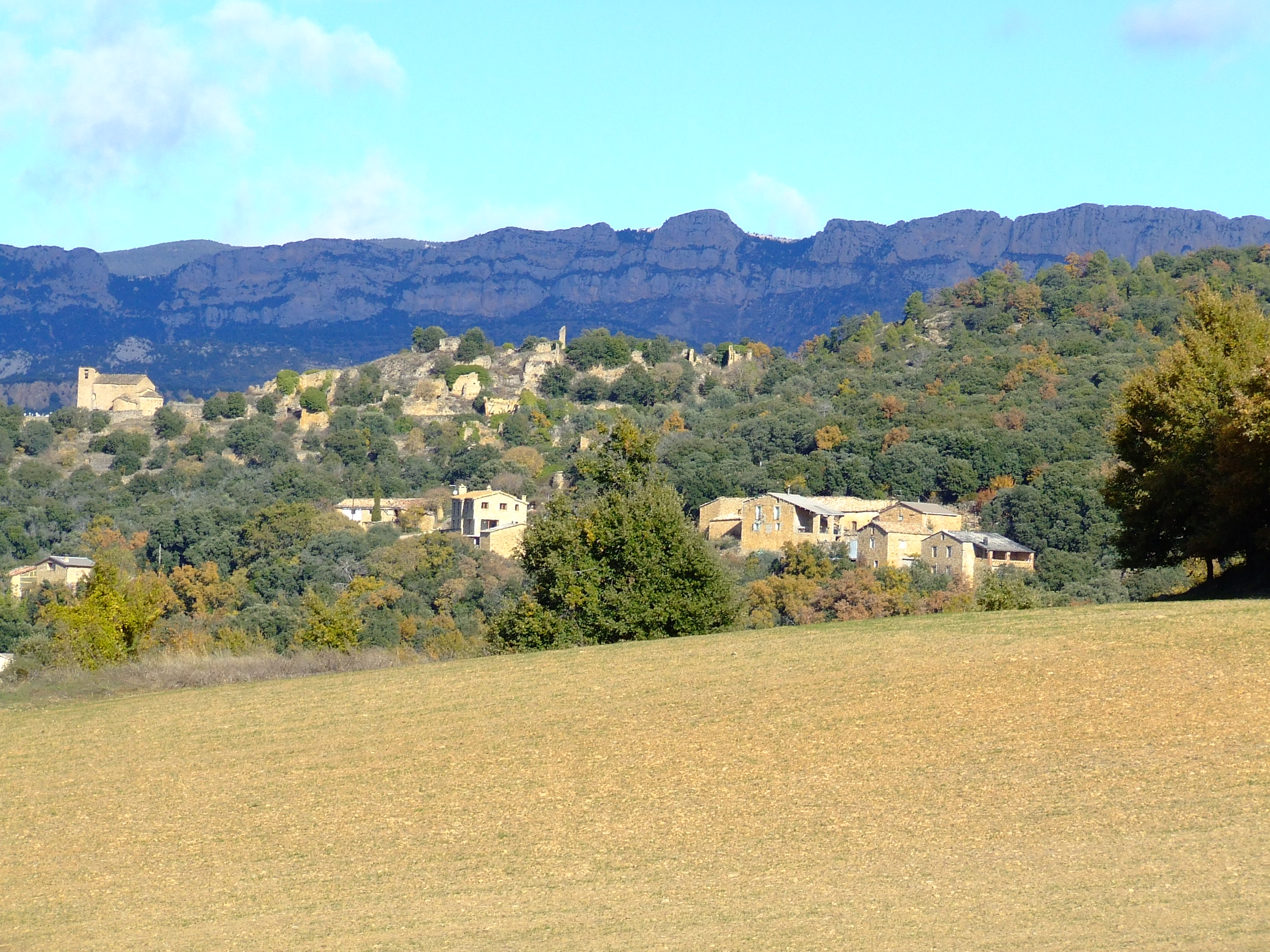

- Location within Province of Lleida Location within Catalonia Location within Spain
- Coordinates: 42°6′10″N 1°5′56″E
- Country: Spain
- Community: Catalonia
- Province: Lleida
- Municipality: Isona i Conca Dellà
- Elevation: 891 m (2,923 ft)

Population
  - Total: 39

Biscarri is a locality located in the municipality of Isona i Conca Dellà, in Province of Lleida province, Catalonia, Spain. In 2020, it had a population of 39.

== Geography ==
Biscarri is located 89km northeast of Lleida.
