= Claret (Tremp) =

- Locality
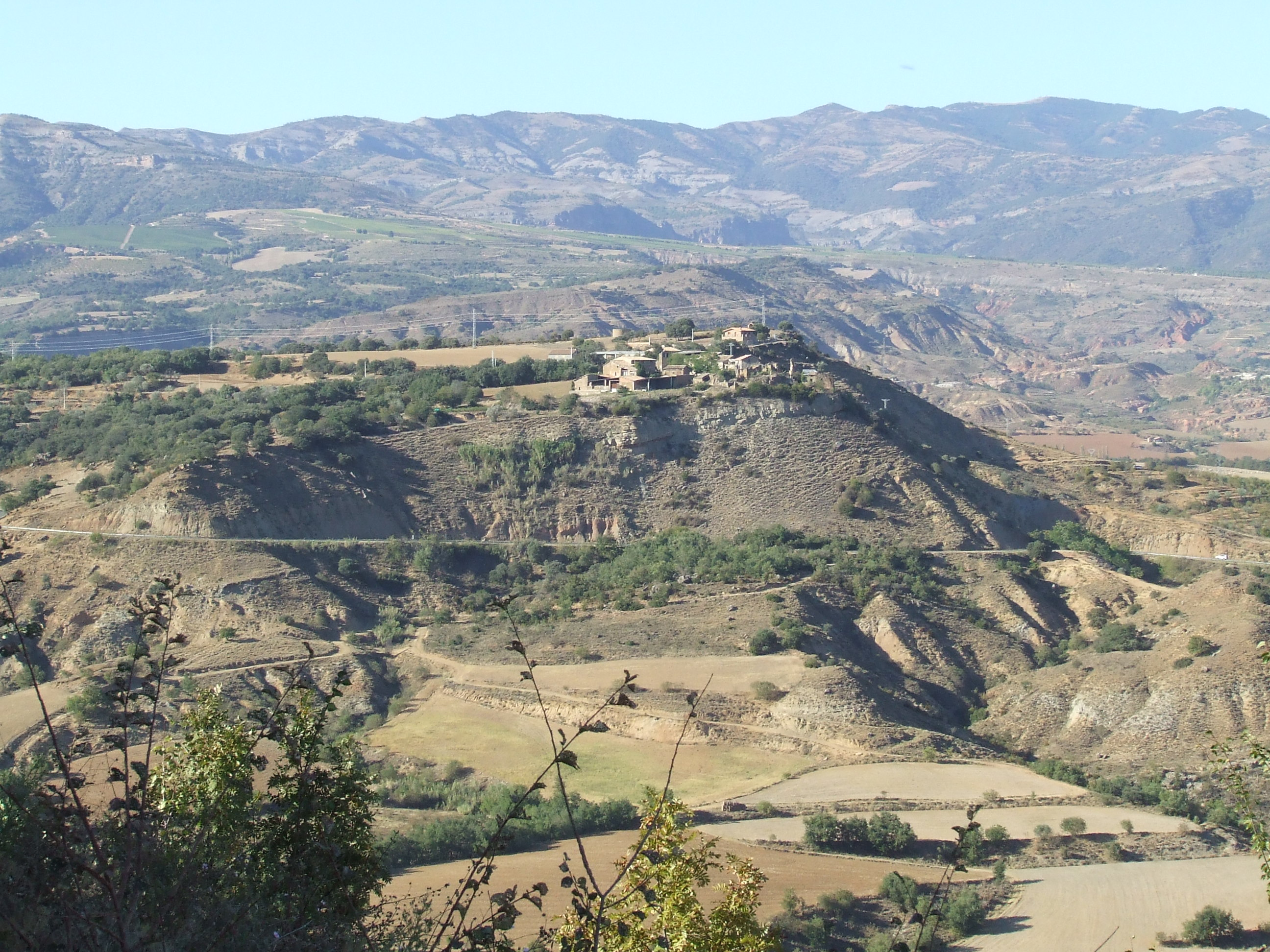

- Location within Province of Lleida Location within Catalonia Location within Spain
- Coordinates: 42°9′15″N 0°52′3″E
- Country: Spain
- Community: Catalonia
- Province: Lleida
- Municipality: Tremp
- Elevation: 622 m (2,041 ft)

Population
  - Total: 7

Claret is a hamlet located in the municipality of Tremp, in Province of Lleida province, Catalonia, Spain. As of 2020, it has a population of 7.

== Geography ==
Claret is located 109 km (68 mi) north-northeast of Lleida.
