= Tremp =

- Municipality
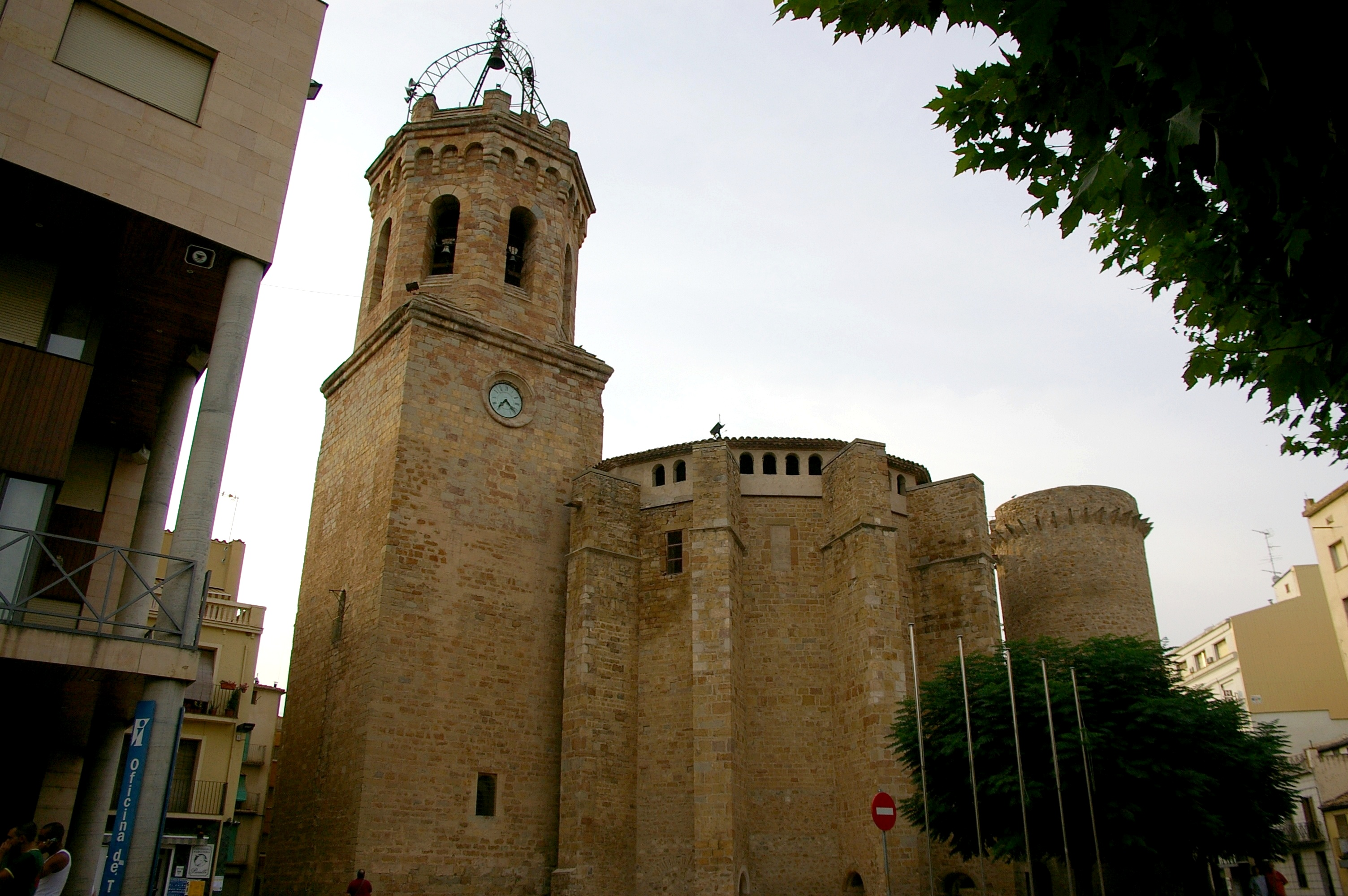

- Flag Coat of arms

- Location in the Province of Lleida Location in Catalonia Location in Spain
- Coordinates: 42°10′N 0°54′E
- Country: Spain
- Community: Catalonia
- Province: Lleida
- Comarca: Pallars Jussà

Government
  - Mayor: Sílvia Romero i Galera (2023-)

Area
  - Total: 302.8 km^{2} (116.9 sq mi)
- Elevation: 468 m (1,535 ft)

Population (2025-01-01)
  - Total: 6,123
  - Density: 20.22/km^{2} (52.37/sq mi)
- Demonym(s): Trempolí, trempolina
- Postal code: 25620
- Climate: Cfb
- Website: www.ajuntamentdetremp.cat

The municipality is a geographical oddity and consists of 5 separate territorial entities within the comarca (district) of Pallars Jussa

Tremp (Catalan: [ˈtɾemp]) is a municipality in Catalonia, Spain, the capital of the comarca of the Pallars Jussà. It is the largest municipality in Catalonia in terms of area (302.80 square kilometre), accounting for nearly a quarter of the total area of the comarca.

The municipality is a geographical oddity and consists of five separate territorial entities within the comarca (district) of Pallars Jussa (see image). The town of Tremp (population 5.961 as of 2023) is the second smallest of these and is situated in the valley of the Noguera Pallaresa river below Talarn and the Talarn Dam. The largest portion of the municipal territory lies to the west of the valley of the Noguera Pallaresa and stretches as far as the Noguera Ribagorçana river. A third portion is an exclave of the comarca within the municipality of el Pont de Suert in the Alta Ribagorça. In the east the villages of Palau de Noguera, Suterranya and Vilamitjana form the fourth entity, while the fifth and smallest portion (of only 1,59 km2) is formed by the village of Puigcercós, south of Tremp.

The town is served by the C-13 road which runs along the valley of the Noguera Pallaresa.

== Demography ==
It has a population of 6,123 (register office, 2025).

1900	1930	1950	1970	1986	2007	2012	2018	2022	2023
4896	6454	6396	5785	5727	6022	6515	5824	5847	5991

== Subdivisions ==
The municipality of Tremp includes twenty-eight outlying settlements: populations are given as of 2005 and 2023:

Settlements	2005	2023
Acadèmia General Bàsica de Subofficials	26	208
Aulàs	15	47
El Castellet	3	3
Casterner de les Olles	1	1
Castissent, on the left bank of the Noguera Ribagorçana river	20	15
Claramunt	1	1
Claret	2	7
Eroles	11	13
Escarlà	2	3
Espills	5	8
Espluga Freda	1	
Espluga de Serra	45	36
Fígols de Tremp	2	8
Gurp	8	18
Els Masos de Tamúrcia	12	
Palau de Noguera	85	53
El Pont d'Orrit	15	
Puigcercós	52	35
Puigverd	1	1
Sant Adrià	4	3
Santa Engràcia, with sulfurous springs	24	16
Sapeira	2	11
Suterranya	69	58
Tendrui	5	6
Tercui, on a hill above the Noguera Ribagorçana	2	1
Torogó	2	5
La Torre de Tamúrcia	17	
Vilamitjana, on the road to Artesa de Segre	207	152

== Places of interest ==
-Les Serretes. It is a place in Vilamitjana municipality known by the finding of an important paleontological site. In this site there have found dinosaur remains that belongs to the Second biggest hadrosaur found in Spain, and the biggest of Catalonia. Also there have been found two carnívor dinosaur tooth that belongs to two new dinosaur species morphotypes.

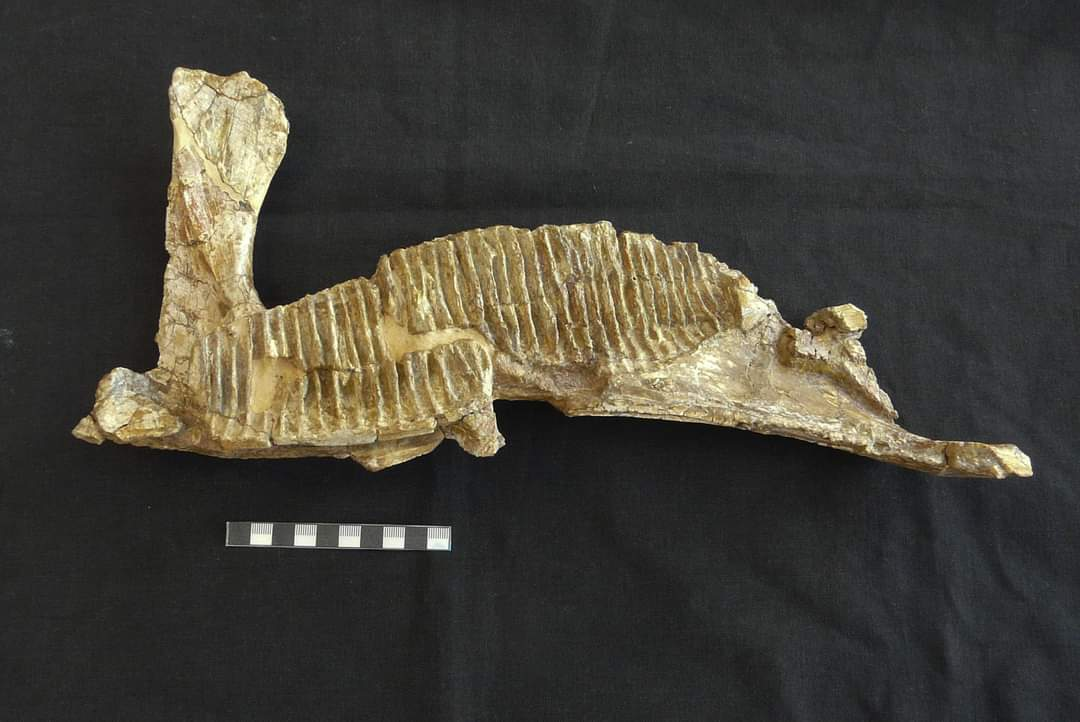

Picture of the dentary from les Serretes. Nowadays exposed on the Museum of Isona.

== Notable people ==
- Francisco Tausí y Oriol

== See also ==
- Talarn Dam
