= Fígols de Tremp =

- Locality
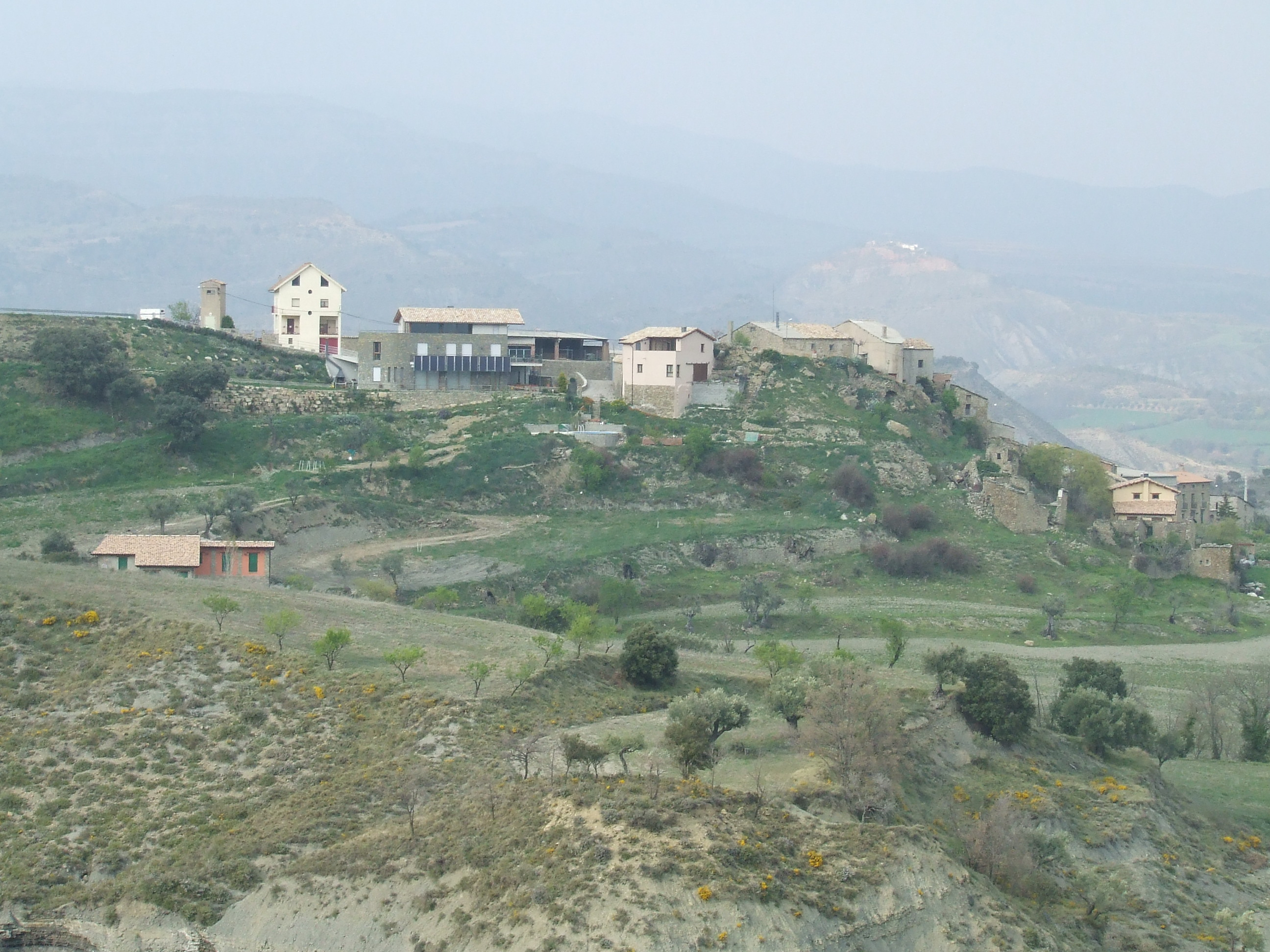

- Location within Province of Lleida Location within Catalonia Location within Spain
- Coordinates: 42°9′11″N 0°48′53″E
- Country: Spain
- Community: Catalonia
- Province: Lleida
- Municipality: Tremp
- Elevation: 733 m (2,405 ft)

Population
  - Total: 6

Fígols de Tremp is a locality located in the municipality of Tremp, in Province of Lleida province, Catalonia, Spain. As of 2020, it has a population of 6.

== Geography ==
Fígols de Tremp is located 103 km (64 mi) north-northeast of Lleida.
