= Isona =

- Locality
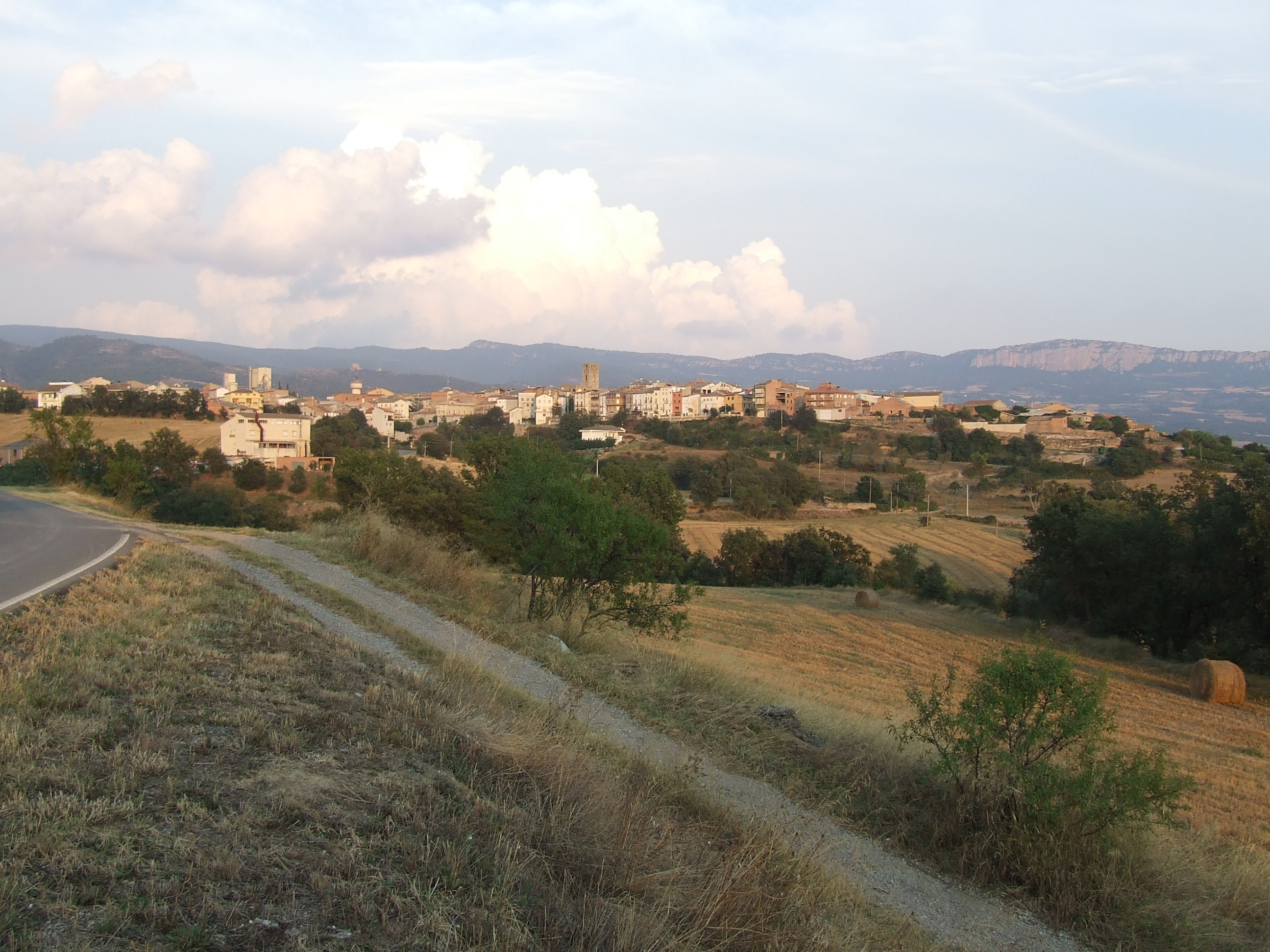

- Location within Province of Lleida Location within Catalonia Location within Spain
- Coordinates: 42°7′14″N 1°2′47″E
- Country: Spain
- Community: Catalonia
- Province: Lleida
- Municipality: Isona i Conca Dellà
- Elevation: 671 m (2,201 ft)

Population
  - Total: 570

Isona (Catalan pronunciation: [iˈzonɛ]) is a locality located in the municipality of Isona i Conca Dellà, in Province of Lleida province, Catalonia, Spain. As of 2020, it has a population of 570. Isona is the capital of the municipality of Isona i Conca Dellà.

== Geography ==
Isona is located 95km northeast of Lleida.
