= Pallars =

Coordinates: 42°26′48.36″N 1°11′51.03″E

- Natural region
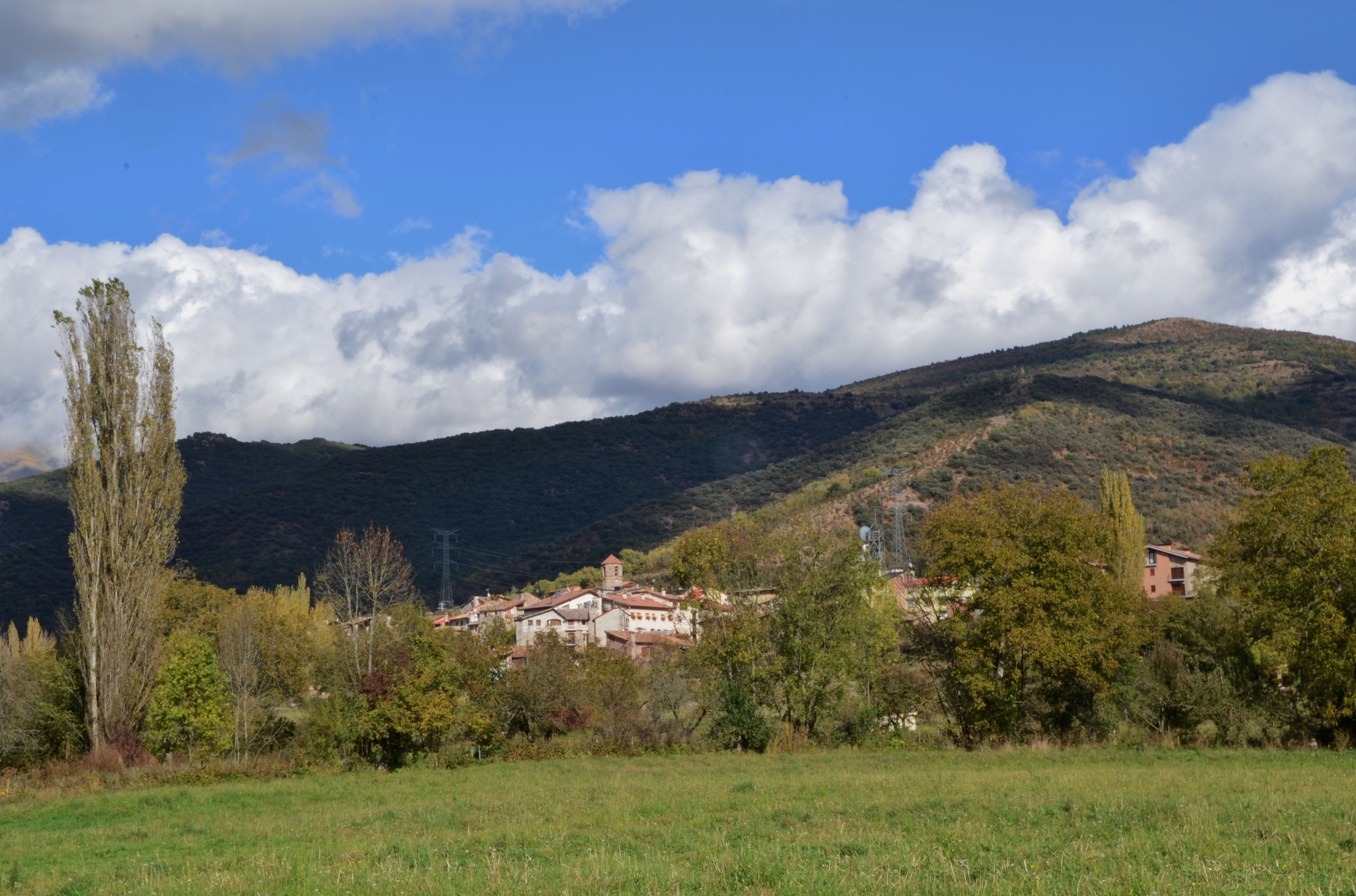
- Pallars region landscape of La Pobleta de Bellveí in Filià, La Torre de Cabdella.

- A map of Catalonia showing the location of the Pallars
- Country: Catalonia, Spain
- Elevation: 460 m (1,510 ft)

Pallars is a historical and natural region of Catalonia. Located in the Pre-Pyrenees and Pyrenees area, most of its territory is mountainous.

The Noguera Pallaresa river is named after this region.

== Geography ==
The physiography of the Pallars natural region includes the Noguera Pallaresa river basin with its tributaries. The region encompasses as well as the mountain ranges spanning the Pyrenees and Pre-Pyrenees area that surround the basin until the Serra del Montsec which forms the limit of the Pallars at its southern end.

=== Municipalities ===
In present times the most important town of the Pallars is Tremp.

==== Pallars Jussà ====
Abella de la Conca, Castell de Mur, Conca de Dalt, Gavet de la Conca, Isona i Conca Dellà, Llimiana, La Pobla de Segur, Salàs de Pallars, Sant Esteve de la Sarga, Sarroca de Bellera, Senterada, Talarn, La Torre de Cabdella and Tremp.

==== Pallars Sobirà ====
Alins, Alt Àneu, Baix Pallars, Espot, Esterri d'Àneu, Esterri de Cardós, Farrera, La Guingueta d'Àneu, Lladorre, Llavorsí, Rialp, Soriguera, Sort, Tírvia and Vall de Cardós

== History ==
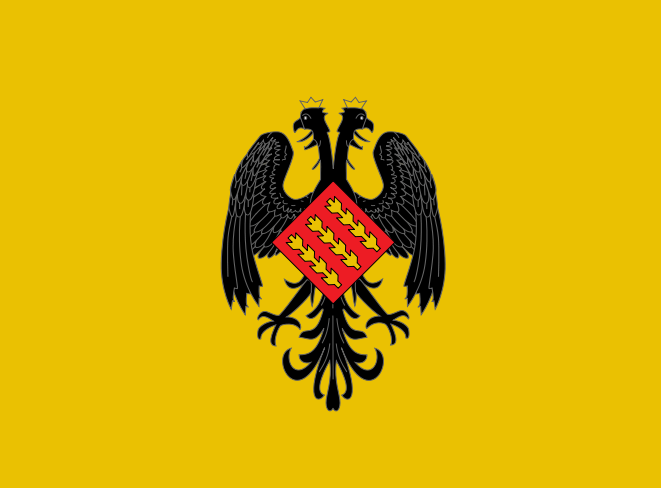
Banner of the Counts of Pallars

The County of Pallars was a county during the ninth and tenth centuries. Later both the County of Pallars Jussà (Lower Pallars) and the County of Pallars Sobirà (Upper Pallars) became counties of the Hispanic March during the eleventh and twelfth centuries.

In 1936 the Pallars was split into the Pallars Jussà and Pallars Sobirà present-day administrative divisions. The historical Ribagorça territories administered by the Generalitat de Catalunya were added to the newly created Pallars Jussà comarca. In 1990 the Ribagorça area was segregated from the Pallars Jussà comarca and was established as the Alta Ribagorça.

== See also ==
- Comarques of Catalonia
- Noguera Pallaresa
- Ribagorça
