= List of rivers of Catalonia =

The rivers of Catalonia can be classified into four groups according to their source.

- Rivers of the Ebre basin, which can be further divided into:
  - the lower basin of the Ebre itself, which corresponds with the comarques of Ribera d'Ebre, Terra Alta, Baix Ebre and Montsià.
  - the basin of the Segre and its affluents, which roughly corresponds, in Catalonia, with the province of Lleida: the basin of the Segre also covers much of Aragon.
- Rivers of the eastern Pyrenees: Muga, Fluvià, Ter, roughly corresponding with the province of Girona
- Rivers of the Pre-Coastal Range: Tordera, Besòs, Foix, Gaià, Francolí
- Rivers of the Coastal Range: these are very short and of only local importance

The Llobregat deserves a special mention because of its importance: its basin covers most of the province of Barcelona. Its source is in the Pyrenean Serra del Cadí in the municipality of Castellar de n'Hug (Berguedà) and its valley is one of the main north–south communication routes in Catalonia.

The Aran Valley is the upper valley of the Garonne (la Garona in Catalan, era Garona in Aranese), an Atlantic river which meets the sea near Bordeaux, France. The boundaries of the comarca do not correspond exactly with the watershed, and both the Noguera Ribagorçana and the Noguera Pallaresa have their sources on its territory.

The frontier between Catalonia and the Valencian Community is formed for much of its length by the Sénia, while the Noguera Ribagorçana forms the frontier with Aragon for much of its northern half.

== List ==
Rivers are listed according to their estuaries, from north to south along the Catalan coastline, or according to the point of confluence, from the sea to the source, for rivers which do not flow directly into the sea. Names are given in Catalan with the appropriate definite article: Spanish names are given in parentheses. Catalan names are usually preferred in English language works, except for the Ebre which is usually referred to by its Spanish name Ebro.

- la Muga
  - el Manol
- el Fluvià
- el Ter
- la Tordera
- el Besòs
  - Caldes
  - el Congost
  - el Ripoll
- el Llobregat
  - l'Anoia
  - el Cardener
  - la Gavarresa
- el Foix
- el Gaià
- el Francolí
- l'Ebre
  - el Segre
    - la Noguera Ribagorçana
    - el Set
    - el Corb
    - el Sió
    - la Noguera Pallaresa
    - el Cinca
    - el Rialb
    - el Llobregós
    - la Valira
- la Sénia

== Linguistic note ==
The Catalan language has two words for "river", riu and riera. The word riera is used for smaller rivers and for streams, and often indicates a seasonal river. Of the above list, only the Gavarresa is commonly classified as a riera, all the others being qualified as rius. The grammatical gender of Anoia is feminine, while that of Ebre is masculine.

== Economic importance ==
The main economic importance of the Catalan rivers is probably the role of their valleys as communication routes, particularly through the Coastal and Prelitteral Ranges. Hence routes inland from Barcelona pass either through the valley of the Llobregat or that of the Besòs, and the Francolí valley is an important route inland from Tarragona.

=== Irrigation ===
Irrigation is important in the drier areas of Catalonia, notably in the Central Depression and in the south. The Canal de Aragó i Catalunya and the Canal d'Urgell distribute the waters of the Segre across the comarques of Noguera and Segrià where it is used for growing cereals, almonds and olives. Irrigation is also important in the comarques of Baix Ebre and Montsià, where the cultivation of rice is widespread.

=== Hydroelectric generation ===
All of the larger Catalan rivers, with the exception of the Llobregat, have been dammed for hydroelectric power. By far the largest dams are those on the Ebre at Riba-roja and at Flix (Ribera d'Ebre). Other dams include

- on the Noguera Pallaresa: Sallente, Cabdella, Molinos, Tavascan, La Pobla de Segur, Talarn (Pallars Jussà), Terradets (Àger, Noguera)
- on the Noguera Ribagorçana: Escales (below Pont de Suert, Alta Ribagorça), Santa Anna, Moralets, Baserca (Ivars de Noguera)
- on the Segre: Oliana (Alt Urgell), Seròs (Segrià)
- on the Ter: Sau (Vilanova de Sau, Osona), Susqueda (Selva)

== See also ==
- List of dams and reservoirs in Catalonia
