= Flamicell =

River in Spain

Coordinates: 42.240452°N 0.970219°E

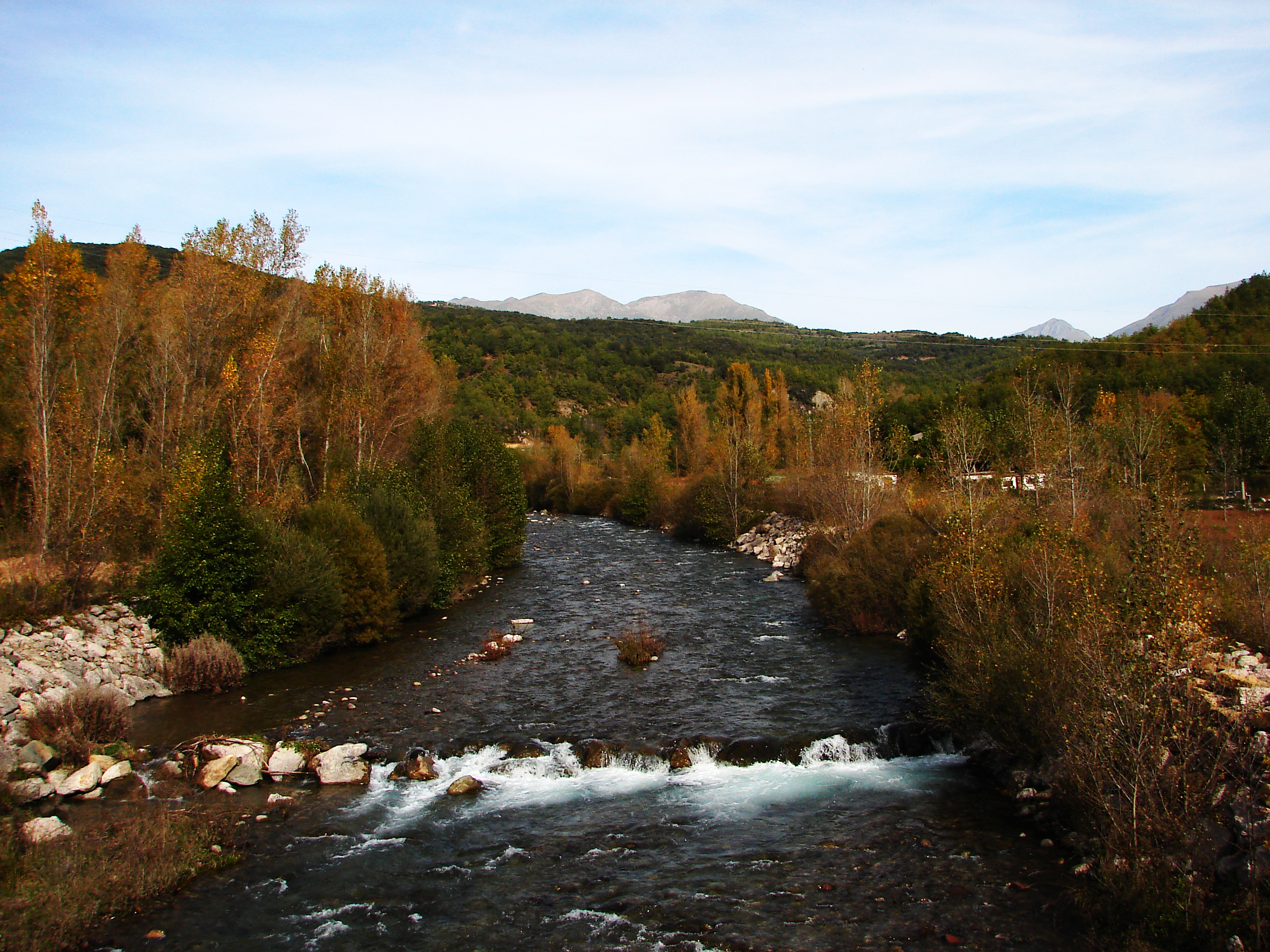
- The Flamicell as it passes through Senterada

Physical characteristics
- Source: Noguera Pallaresa
- Length: 34 km (21 mi)

The Flamicell, or Flamisell is a river in the province of Pallars, Catalonia, Spain. It is 34 km long and is a tributary of the Noguera Pallaresa. This river is known for the variation in flow depending on the time of the year and the meteorological conditions. The flow is also very strong because it brings water from many different lakes, one of them being the Lake Gento (see Cabdella Lakes). In 1937, the flow was so strong that it destroyed the hydroelectric station in Cabdella and brought to La Pobla de Segur a flow of 700 m³/s.

Its name is derived from the Latin word flamicellu which means small river.

== Course ==
The source of the river is in Cabdella and it flows south passing the town of La Pobleta de Bellvei and the village of La Plana de Mont-ros. Two tributaries join it and the river reaches its maximum width. A few kilometres later it passes La Pobla de Segur and joins the river of Noguera Pallaresa just above the Sant Antoni reservoir.

== Hydroelectric energy ==
This river has been used to generate hydroelectric energy for more than a hundred years. There are four hydroelectric power stations along the river located at La Pobla de Segur, Cabdella, La Plana de Mont-ros and Molinos.

== Conditions ==
This river has a very good oxygen saturation of a 77% and 5 mg/L of nitrates. That indicates that the river is in very good natural conditions.

== Fish ==
The main fish that live in this river is the common trout. It has been confirmed that the 95% of this species, opposite from the salmon, do not reach the sea. Also the 95% of the common trout that live in this river have an average movement of fifty meters. Which means that only a 5% of them travel for distances longer than 500 meters.
