= Boadella =

Boadella may refer to:

== People ==
- Albert Boadella, Spanish actor and director
- Genís Boadella (born 1979), Catalan politician

== Places ==
- Boadella i les Escaules, municipality in the comarca of the Alt Empordà
- Darnius-Boadella Reservoir, reservoir located on the Muga river
