= Gironella (surname) =

Gironella is a surname. It may refer to:

- Alberto Gironella (1929–1999), Mexican painter
- Alicia Gironella De'Angeli (born 1931), Mexican chef
- Erasmo Janer Gironella (1833–1911), Spanish entrepreneur and politician
- Francisco Gironella (born 1930), Spanish rower
- Guillem Ramon de Gironella, 13th-century Catalan troubadour
- José María Gironella (1917–2003), Catalan author
- Margarida Gironella (1886–1964), Catalan anarchist
