= José María Gironella =

Catalonian Spanish author

José María Gironella Pous, known in Catalan as Josep Maria Gironella i Pous (31 December 1917 in Darnius – 3 January 2003 in Arenys de Mar) was a Catalonian Spanish author best known for his fictional work The Cypresses Believe in God (Los cipreses creen en Dios), which was published in Spain in 1953 and translated into English in 1955 by Harriet de Onís (1899-1969), a translator who usually specialized in Latin-American fiction.

== Biography ==
Born on December 31, 1917, in Darnius, Girona. From a humble family, he studied in a seminary between the ages of 10 and 12, and worked in different jobs (drugstore clerk, liquor factory worker, bank clerk, etc.). He was a member of the Federation of Young Christians of Catalonia. At the beginning of the Spanish Civil War, he fled the republican territory in France and entered the Franco zone to join Franco's army, specifically the Terç de Requetès de la Mare de Déu de Montserrat. In December 1936 he joined the Military Information and Police Service (SIPM) in the area of Pallars and the Aran Valley, and carried out smuggling operations. Upon being discovered, he was imprisoned in Figueres in 1940. In 1946 he married Magdalena Castanyer, and published his first book of poetry, Ha llegado el invierno y tú no estás aquí (The Winter has Come and You are not Here). His first mainstream success came that same year when his novel Un hombre (A Man) won the Premi Nadal, a prestigious literary prize in Spain.

Gironella's key work, his trilogy about the Spanish Civil War—Los cipreses creen en Dios (The Cypresses Believe in God), 1953; Un millón de muertos (One Million Dead), 1961; and Ha estallado la paz (The Peace has Burst), 1966—attained remarkable success. Gironella lived in Paris and Helsinki. He died in 2003 due to a cerebral embolism, three days after his 85th birthday, at his home in Arenys de Mar, where he had retired. He was buried in Arenys de Munt cemetery.

== The Cypresses Believe in God ==
The book is a novel in two parts, and is the first novel of four, written from a Roman Catholic viewpoint, by its Catholic author, who had been educated in a seminary — but who attempted to approach the many nuances and subtleties among all the factions on the eve of war in a fair, even-handed manner. The story is set in Girona, a city in eastern Catalonia, and follows the life of a family, from 1931 until the Spanish Civil War breaks out in 1936. The protagonist is the son of an atheist from Madrid, who is married to a devout Basque woman, and has a younger brother and sister also caught up in the conflict. In a sequel to Cypresses, One Million Dead (Un millón de muertos), translated by Joan MacLean, Gironella follows the Alvear family through the war. The next novel is Peace after War, published in English in 1969, and was also translated by MacLean. The fourth novel, Los hombres lloran solos (Men cry alone), has not been translated into English.

While Gironella hated the polarization that led to Civil War, he supported the Spanish Nationalists who rallied around Franco and himself joined the Carlist unit, Requetés (short for "Tercio de Requetés de la Madre de Dios de Montserrat"). In The New York Times Book Review, Gerald Brenan, an expert on Spanish literature, called the work absorbing and remarkably objective. In its pages, he said, "The sane and the moderate, caught helplessly in a dilemma they did not ask for, must throw in their lot with one violent party or another till mercifully the passions of the war submerge them and confirm their decision. It is this tragic unfolding of events which concerns this novel." In contrast, many modern scholars have strongly objected to the errors, omissions and modifications made by Gironella regarding the speech by the University of Salamanca's dean, philosopher Miguel de Unamuno, against the military rebels.
