= Gavet =

Gavet may refer to:

- Gavet de la Conca, a village in the province of Lleida and autonomous community of Catalonia, Spain
- James Gavet (b. 1989), New Zealand rugby league footballer
- Jordan Gavet, New Zealand R&B singer
- Livet-et-Gavet, a commune in the Isère department in south-eastern France
