= List of dams and reservoirs in Catalonia =

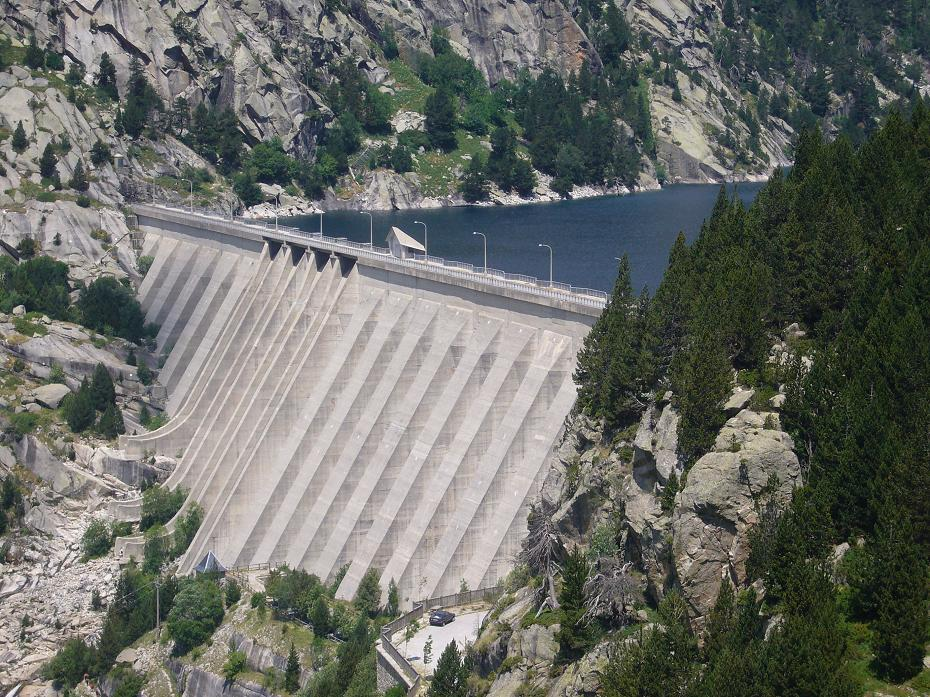
Pantà de Cavallers, Vall de Boí.

This is a list of dams and reservoirs in Catalonia, Spain.

== List ==
List of dams and reservoirs by the Catalan Water Agency (Catalan: Agència Catalana de l'Aigua):

Basin	Reservoir	Type	Height (m)	Length along the top (m)	Drainage basin (km²)	Reservoir surface (ha)	Volume (hm³)
Ter	Pantà de Sau	Gravity	83	260	1522	572.8	151.3
Ter	Pantà de Seva	Gravity	14.5	112.5	272		0.76
Ter	Pantà de Susqueda	Round double curvature	135	360	1775	466	233
Ter	Pantà del Pasteral	Gravity	33	150	23	34.6	2
Ter	Resclosa de Colomers	Barrage	18	103	3000	70	1
Llobregat	Pantà de la Baells	Round double curvature	102.3	302.4	535	364.7	109.5
Llobregat	Pantà de Sant Ponç	Gravity	59.5	311	317	144.5	24.4
Llobregat	Pantà de la Llosa del Cavall	Round double curvature	122.3	326	200	300	79.4
Llobregat	Pantà de Sant Martí de Tous	Earth	34	276.5	16.2	14.9	1.3
Muga	Darnius-Boadella Reservoir	Gravity	63	250	182	363.3	60.2
Gaià	Pantà del Catllar	Earth and Gravity	79	384	390	326.2	60.4
Foix	Foix Reservoir	Arch-gravity dam	38	190.8	290	67.9	3.74
Portbou	Pantà de Portbou	Arch-gravity dam	27.5	87.2	2.6	1.4	1
Riudecanyes	Pantà de Riudecanyes	Arch-gravity dam	51	234.8	30	40.3	5.3
Tordera	Pantà de Santa Fe	Arch-gravity dam	24	160	4.5	6.9	0.8
Besòs	Pantà de Vallforners	Earth	62	160	12.5	11.4	2.3
Noguera Ribagorçana	Pantà d'Escales	Gravity	125	200	731	400	152
Noguera Ribagorçana	Pantà de Canelles	Round double curvature	150	210	1628	1569	678
Noguera Ribagorçana	Pantà de Santa Anna	Gravity	101	240	1757	768	237
Noguera Ribagorçana	Pantà de Cavallers	Buttress dam	70	360	30	47	16
Noguera Ribagorçana	Estany de Salado	Gravity	18.9	87.7	1	9.5	1.15
Segre	Pantà d'Oliana	Gravity	102	268	2672	443	101
Segre	Pantà de Rialb	Gravity	99	605.9	3320	430	402.8
Segre	Pantà de Sant Llorenç de Montgai	Gravity	25	164	7110	131	10
Segre	Pantà d'Utxesa	Earth	28	400		74	4
Segre	Pantà d'Utxesa-Seca	Earth	18	388		120	4
Segre	Pantà d'Utxesa-Valleta	Earth	14	270		48	4
Noguera Pallaresa	Pantà de Borén	Gravity	33.5	98	203	11	1
Noguera Pallaresa	Pantà de la Torrassa	Gravity	21	193	360	49	2
Noguera Pallaresa	Pantà de Sant Antoni	Gravity	86	180	2070	927	205
Noguera Pallaresa	Pantà dels Terradets	Gravity	47	160	2620	330	23
Noguera Pallaresa	Pantà de Camarasa	Gravity	103	145	2850	624	163
Noguera Pallaresa	Pantà de Graus	Gravity	25.5	100	41	5	0.3
Noguera Pallaresa	Pantà de Tavascan	Gravity	31	57	129	8	0.6
Noguera Pallaresa	Pantà de Sant Maurici	Gravity	19	98	29	25	2.3
Noguera Pallaresa	Estanys de Cabdella	Gravity	15.9	52.6	0.85	10	1.25
Noguera Pallaresa	Estany de Reguera	Gravity	19.6	144	2	10	0.8
Noguera Pallaresa	Estany de Colomina	Gravity	15.5	77.5	0.7	15	3.7
Noguera Pallaresa	Estany Tort de Peguera	Gravity	17.1	138	10	54	1.3
Noguera Pallaresa	Pantà de Sallente	Earth	89	398	4	31	6.5
Torrent de Montblanquets	Pantà de la Palma d'Ebre	Earth	30.5	240	1.68	16.6	1.4
Montsant	Pantà de Vilella Baixa	Volta	22	31.5	156	3	0.1
Ebre	Talarn Dam	Gravity	82	206			
Ebre	Pantà de Riba-roja	Gravity	60	565	79177	2152	210
Ebre	Pantà de Flix	Gravity	26	400	82246	320	11
Ebre	Pantà de Siurana	Gravity	63	274	60	85	12
Ebre	Pantà de Margalef	Arch-gravity dam	33.2	96	97.2	31.8	3
Ebre	Pantà dels Guiamets	Gravity	47	189	75	62	10
Garona	Sant Joan de Toran	Gravity	40	64.7	9	0.5	0.1
Garona	Toran o Pont de rei	Gravity	34.8	93	49	1.96	0.2
Garona	Estanh Major de Colomèrs	Gravity	25.3	165.2	8	17.8	2.8
Garona	Estanh de Montcasau	Gravity	16	192.7	2	3.1	0.1
Garona	Era Restanca	Gravity	25	188.9	5	6.7	0.8

== See also ==
- List of dams and reservoirs
- List of dams and reservoirs in Spain
