= Alan Baró =

Spanish footballer

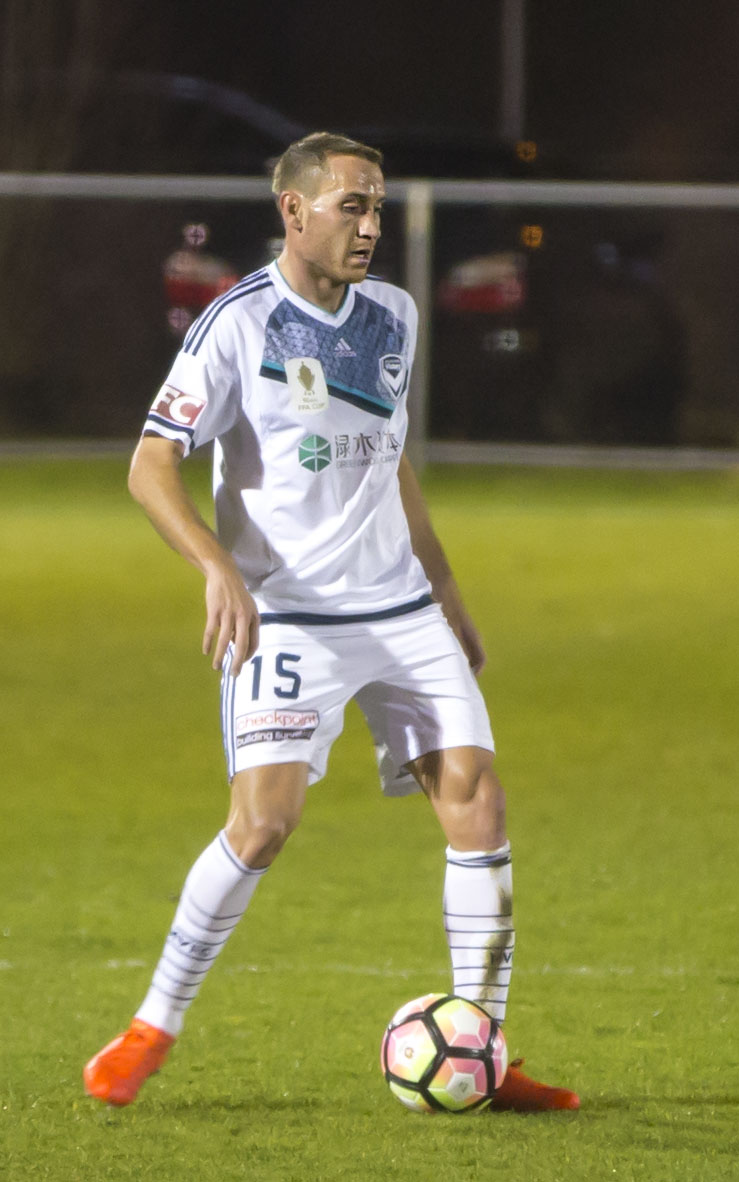
- Baró with Melbourne Victory in 2016

Personal information
- Full name: Alan Baró Calabuig
- Date of birth: 22 June 1985 (age 41)
- Place of birth: Darnius, Spain
- Height: 1.80 m (5 ft 11 in)
- Positions: Defensive midfielder; centre-back

Senior career*
Years	Team	Apps	(Gls)
2005–2006	Peralada		
2006–2007	Figueres	35	(3)
2007–2009	Alicante	58	(1)
2009–2010	Osasuna B	31	(2)
2010	Osasuna	1	(0)
2010–2011	Albacete	24	(0)
2011–2016	Ponferradina	161	(3)
2016–2017	Melbourne Victory	26	(0)
2017–2018	Central Coast Mariners	24	(1)
2018–2021	Olot	84	(7)
2021–2026	Peralada	122	(6)
- * Club domestic league appearances and goals as of 15:16, 27 January 2026 (UTC)

Alan Baró Calabuig (Spanish pronunciation: [ˈalam baˈɾo]; (Note: In isolation, Alan is pronounced [ˈalan].) born 22 June 1985) is a Spanish professional footballer who plays mainly as a central defender but also as a defensive midfielder.

He amassed Segunda División totals of 177 matches and two goals over six seasons, mainly at the service of Ponferradina (four years). He appeared once in La Liga with Osasuna, and also played in Australia.

== Club career ==
=== Early career ===
Born in Darnius, Girona, Catalonia, Baró began his career with local clubs CF Peralada and UE Figueres, suffering relegation from Segunda División B with the latter at the end of 2006–07. On 6 July 2007, he signed for Alicante CF in the same league, playing 39 official games in his first season as the Valencians earned promotion and a further 26 in the second as they were relegated.

=== Osasuna ===
In summer 2009, Baró moved to La Liga with CA Osasuna, initially being registered to their reserves in the third division. On 26 October, he was called up by manager José Antonio Camacho for a Copa del Rey match against Xerez CD, but eventually did not feature in the 2–1 away win. The following 24 January, away to the same opponents (same venue and score), he played the final minute in place of Javier Camuñas without touching the ball, handing him the record of the shortest career for the Navarrese club.

=== Albacete ===
On 8 July 2010, Baró returned to Segunda División, signing a two-year deal at Albacete Balompié. He stayed for only one season at the Estadio Carlos Belmonte – ending in relegation – being sent off in the 26th minute of a 4–2 loss at Xerez on 23 April 2011.

=== Ponferradina ===
Subsequently, Baró joined another team in the third tier, SD Ponferradina, totalling 44 appearances in his debut campaign as they won promotion via the play-offs. He was always first choice during his spell at the Estadio El Toralín, mainly as a centre-back, scoring his first goal on 9 December 2012 in a 3–1 home victory over CD Mirandés.

Baró started in 34 of his 35 appearances in 2015–16, but the club was relegated from the second division after a four-year stay.

=== Australia ===
On 7 July 2016, Baró signed with Melbourne Victory FC as a replacement for the retired Matthieu Delpierre. He was released on 12 May 2017, moving to fellow A-League side Central Coast Mariners FC late in that month.

On 23 September 2017, Baró was announced as the latter's captain. In June of the following year, the 33-year-old mutually terminated his contract despite having a year left on it.
