= Darnius-Boadella Reservoir =

Boadella Reservoir
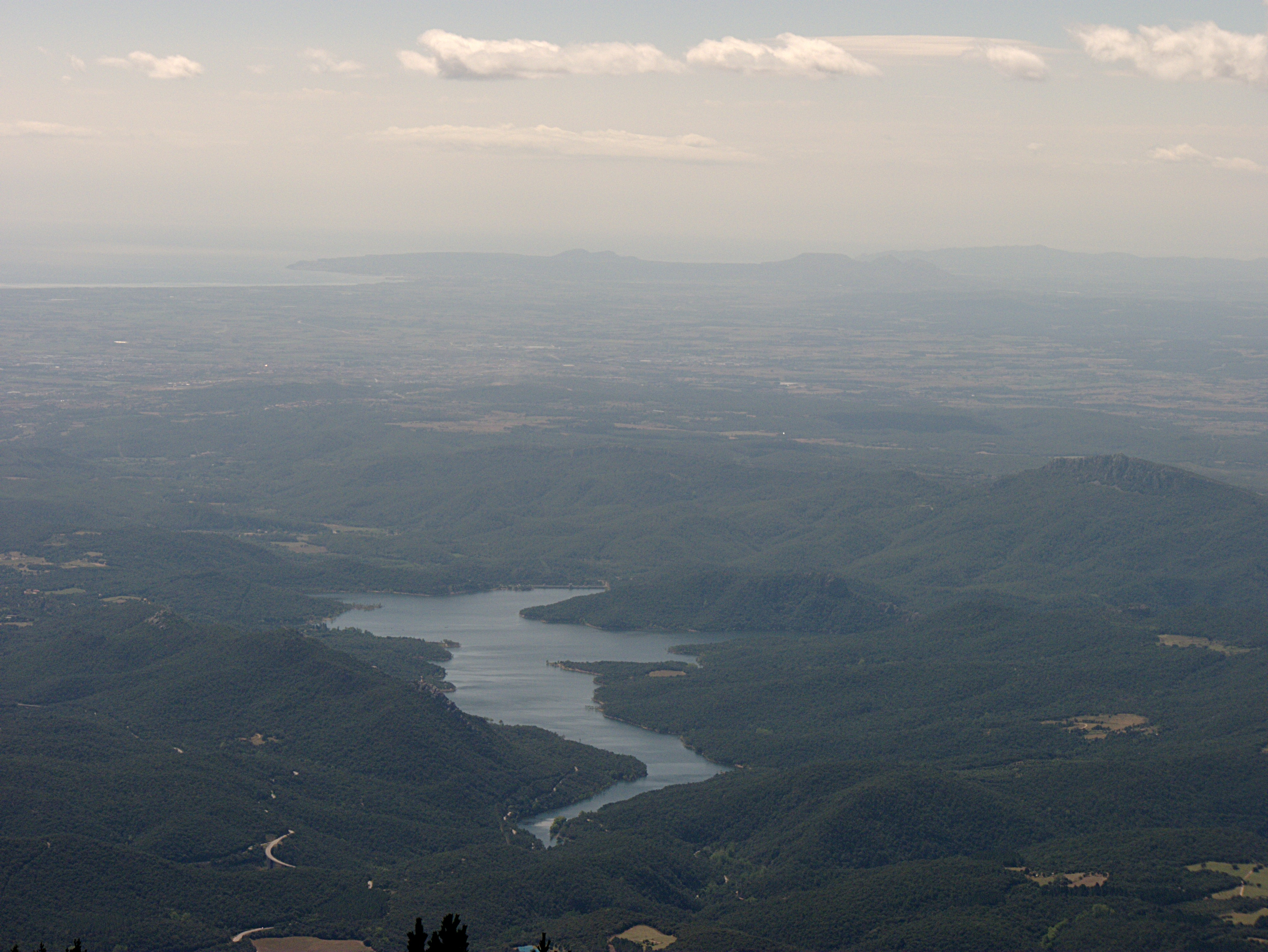
- The reservoir in 2011

- Location of Pantà de Boadella
- Official name: Pantà de Boadella
- Country: Spain
- Location: Darnius, Catalonia
- Coordinates: 42°20′27″N 2°50′0″E
- Status: Operational
- Construction began: 1959
- Opening date: 1969

Dam and spillways
- Type of dam: Gravity dam
- Impounds: Muga
- Height: 63 m (207 ft)
- Length: 250 m (820 ft)

Reservoir
- Total capacity: 60.2 hm³
- Catchment area: 182 km^{2}
- Surface area: 363.3 ha

Boadella reservoir (Catalan: Pantà de Boadella) is a reservoir located on the Muga river, near Darnius, Catalonia, Spain. The dam is located at Darnius while the main water body is also within the boundaries of Sant Llorenç de la Muga, Terrades and Maçanet de Cabrenys. Despite giving it its name to the reservoir, the municipality of Boadella i les Escaules is not located within its boundaries. The construction of the hydroelectric dam was completed in 1969 and was designed by chief engineer Eugenio Pinedo, creating a reservoir with a storage capacity of 60.2 hm³. The dam has a structural height of 63 m and a crest length of 250 m.

A beach lies on a side of the reservoir, with food and entertainment amenities.

== Name ==
The reservoir was inaugurated as the Boadella Reservoir, even though it directly stands within the limit of the city of Darnius. In 2013, the Commission for toponymy ruled to change the name to Darnius reservoir (Pantà de Boadella), but Boadella contested this decision. In February 2015, the commission for toponymy settled the dispute and renamed the reservoir the Darnius-Boadella reservoir (Pantà de Darnius-Boadella).

== See also ==
- List of dams and reservoirs in Catalonia
