= Cabdella Lakes =

Set of lakes in the Spanish Pyrenees

Coordinates: 42.5093°N 0.997903°E

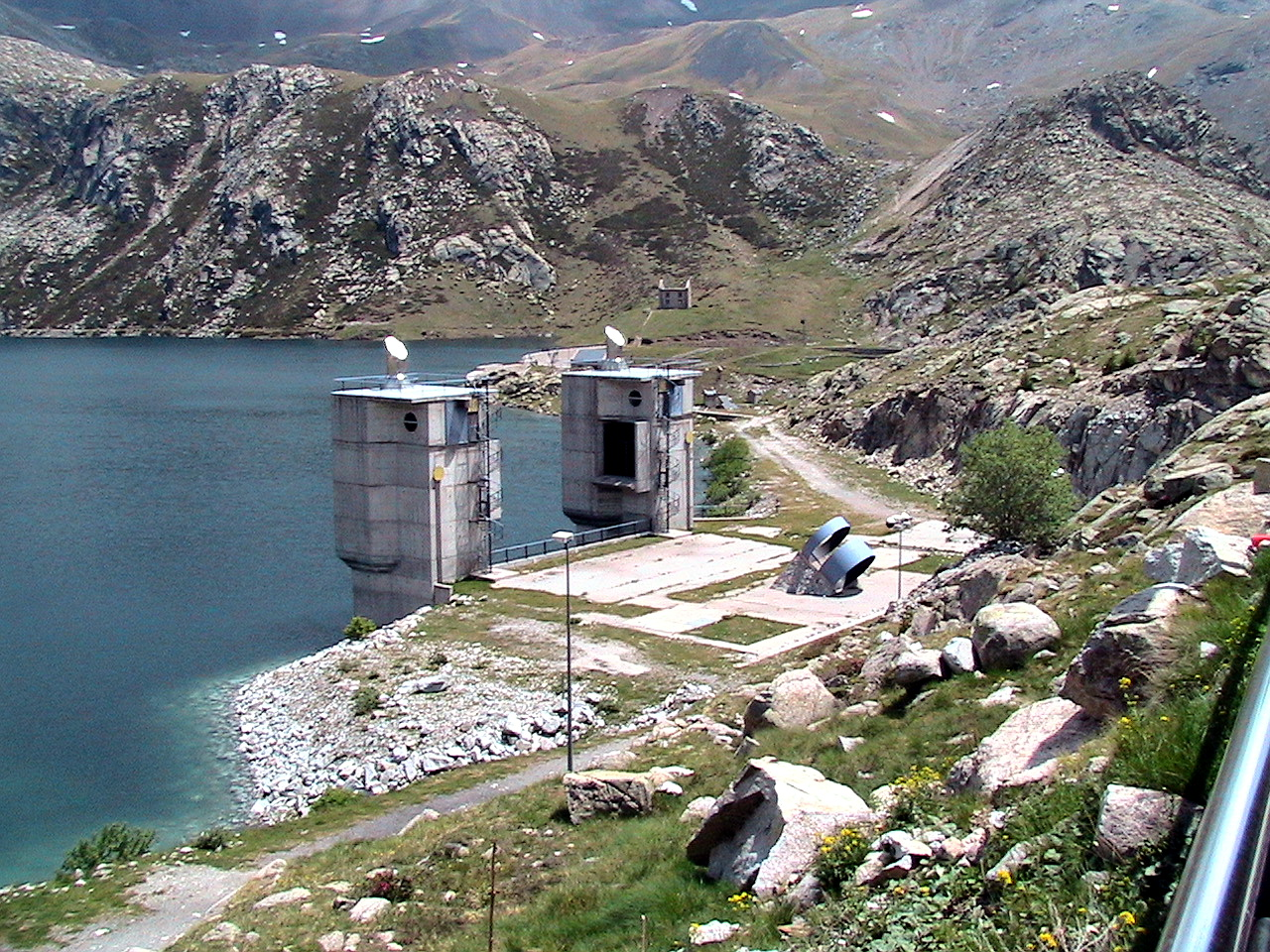
Cabdella Lakes

Cabdella Lakes is a set of lakes in the Spanish Pyrenees. They are connected by tunnels at the head of the Fosca Valley, at Lleida. The network of lakes provide water to Lake Gento (Estany Gento) where there are two hydroelectric plants, Sallente Reservoir, and Central Hidroelectrica de Cabdella. This system is located in the municipality of La Torre de Cabdella, in the county of Pallars Jussà.

== Geography ==
Cabdella Lakes is a complex system of water storage and resources, which is used by area consumers. It incorporates the Flamisell River, which is part of the Noguera Pallaresa basin. The system was created by the interconnection of approximately 30 glacial lakes, many of which were enlarged with the erection of a small dam which increased the lakes' original capacity. The Sallente Reservoir regulates the system at Lake Gento. The Central Hidroelectrica de Cabdella was constructed in 1985. This hydroelectric plant uses the water collected by a large network of underground channels which were built in the early 20th century. The hydroelectric plant is reversible, using the surplus electricity produced at certain times of the day.

== Trail ==
A 5 kilometres (3.1 mi) walking trail follows with the route of the old narrow-gauge railway used to transport materials and workers when construction began in 1912. The trail includes several tunnels, long loops, the dammed Lake Gento, the Sallente Reservoir, and views of granite peaks.

== Larger lakes within the system ==

- Gento Lake (2,132 metres (6,995 ft))
- Mar (2,427 metres (7,963 ft))
- Colomina (2,411 metres (7,910 ft))
- Xic de Colomina (2,420 metres (7,940 ft))
- Saburó (2,530 metres (8,300 ft))
- Petit de Saburó (2,560 metres (8,400 ft))
- Saburó d’Amunt (2,600 metres (8,500 ft))
- Tort (2,325 metres (7,628 ft))
- Vidal (2,440 metres (8,010 ft))
- Vidals d’Amunt (2,680 metres (8,790 ft))
- Frescau (2,418 metres (7,933 ft))
- Mariolo (2,272 metres (7,454 ft))
- Cubieso (2,340 metres (7,680 ft))
- Etserola (2,340 metres (7,680 ft))
- Castieso (2,340 metres (7,680 ft))
- Morto (2,340 metres (7,680 ft))
- Carbonera (2,420 metres (7,940 ft))
- Fosser (2,122 metres (6,962 ft))
- Morera (2,350 metres (7,710 ft))
- Grenut (2,460 metres (8,070 ft))
- Cogomella (2,460 metres (8,070 ft))
- Travessan (2,360 metres (7,740 ft))
- Reguera (2,430 metres (7,970 ft))
- Salado (2,370 metres (7,780 ft))
- Francí (2,320 metres (7,610 ft))
- Ribanegra (2,360 metres (7,740 ft))
- Castell (2,460 metres (8,070 ft))

== Bibliography ==
- Prados, M. J.; Velasco, María José Prados (25 November 2008). Naturbanization: new identities and processes for rural-natural areas. CRC Press. ISBN 978-0-415-49000-9.
- Reynolds, Kev (3 December 2014). Walks and Climbs in the Pyrenees: Walks, Climbs and Multi-day Treks. Cicerone Press. ISBN 978-1-78362-120-0.
