= Gaià River =

River in Catalonia, Spain

Coordinates: 41°13′12″N 1°20′39″E

Gaià
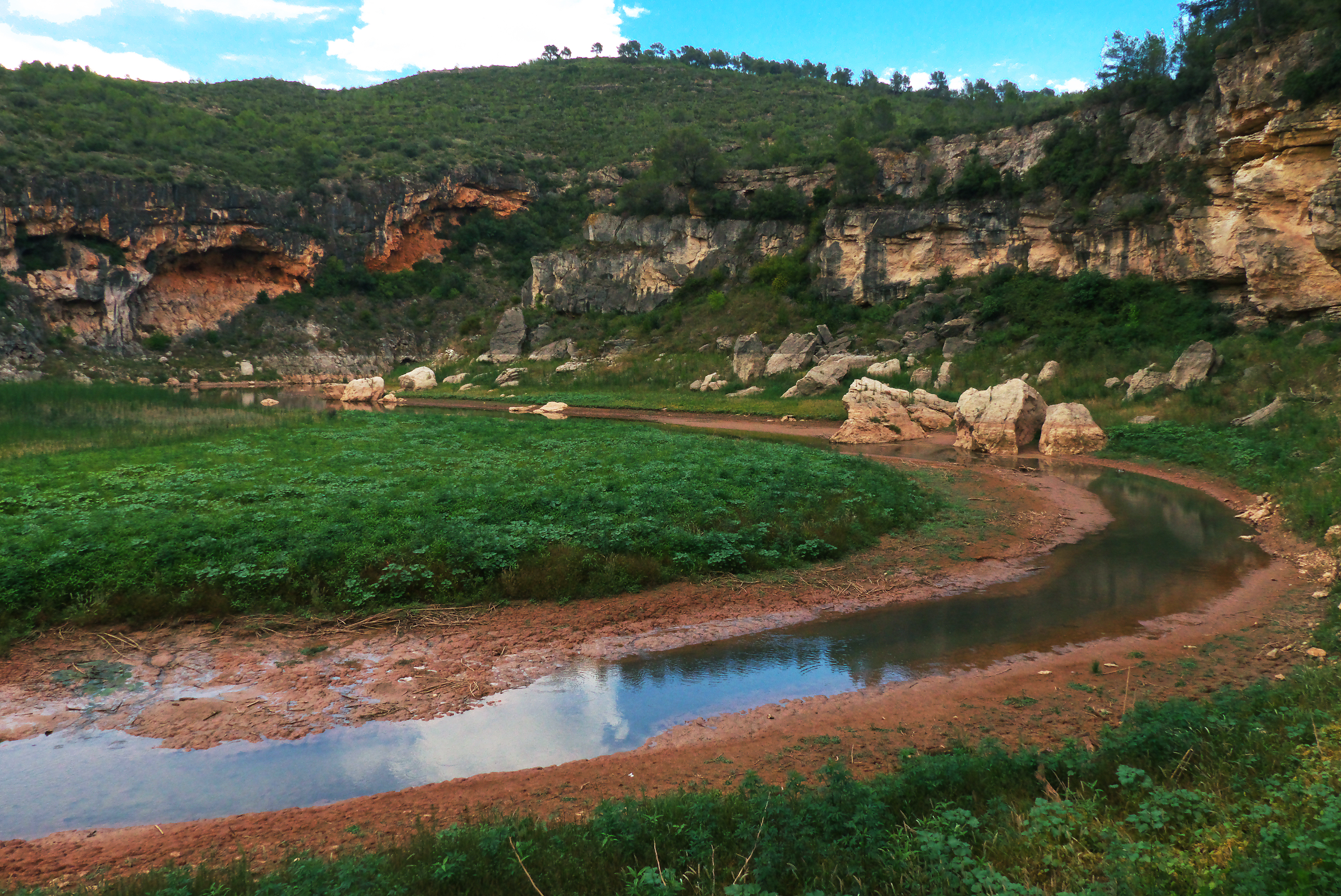
- The Gaià River at l'Altrera near Santes Creus

Location
- Country: Spain

Physical characteristics
- Source
  - location: Santa Coloma de Queralt
- Mouth
  - location: Mediterranean Sea
  - elevation: 0 m (0 ft)
- Length: 59 km (37 mi)
- Basin size: 423.8 km^{2} (163.6 sq mi)
- Discharge
  - average: 0.57 m^{3}/s (20 cu ft/s)

The Gaià (Catalan pronunciation: [gəˈja]) is a 59 km long river in Tarragona Province, Catalonia.

== Course ==
Its source is at Santa Coloma de Queralt, situated in the Catalan Central Depression, gathering the waters of the Serra de Brufaganya and Serra de Queralt mountain ranges. It flows through deep gorges across the Catalan Pre-Coastal Range and then close to Santes Creus and, at the end, into the Mediterranean at the Tamarit Castle, Tarragonès, near Altafulla forming a coastal lagoon separated from the sea by a sandbar. The river mouth is a protected area.

== Tributaries ==
Its main tributaries are:

- Torrent de Claret
- Riu de baix
- Torrent del Biure
- Torrent Sant Magí
- Torrent de Vallespinosa
- Torrent de Rupit
- Torrent Rubio
- Torrent de Pinatelles
- Riu de Boix
- Torrent d'en Serrat
- Torrent de Biany
- L'Escurri

== See also ==
- List of rivers of Catalonia
