= Pasteral Reservoir =

Dam in La Cellera de Ter, Catalonia, Spain

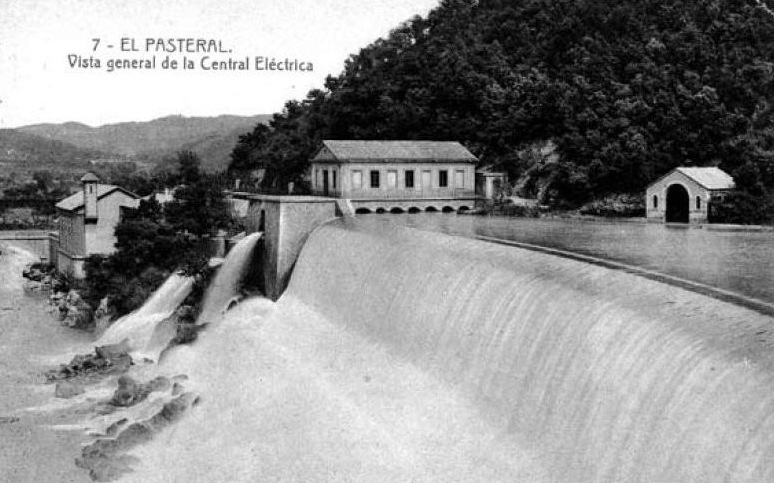
- Pasteral Reservoir in 1905

- Location of Pantà del Pasteral
- Official name: Pantà del Pasteral
- Country: Spain
- Location: La Cellera de Ter, Catalonia
- Coordinates: 41°59′3.95″N 2°36′4.28″E
- Status: Operational

Dam and spillways
- Type of dam: Gravity dam
- Impounds: Ter
- Height: 33 m (108 ft)
- Length: 150 m (490 ft)

Reservoir
- Total capacity: 2 hm³
- Catchment area: 23 km²
- Surface area: 34.6 ha

Pasteral Reservoir (Catalan: Pantà del Pasteral) is a reservoir located on the Ter river, on the border between La Cellera de Ter and Amer, Catalonia, Spain.

The reservoir has a storage capacity of 233 hm³. The dam on the other hand has a structural height of 33 m and a crest length of 150 m.

== See also ==
- List of dams and reservoirs in Catalonia
