= Francolí =

River in Catalonia, Spain

Coordinates: 41°23′33.28″N 1°8′2.8″E

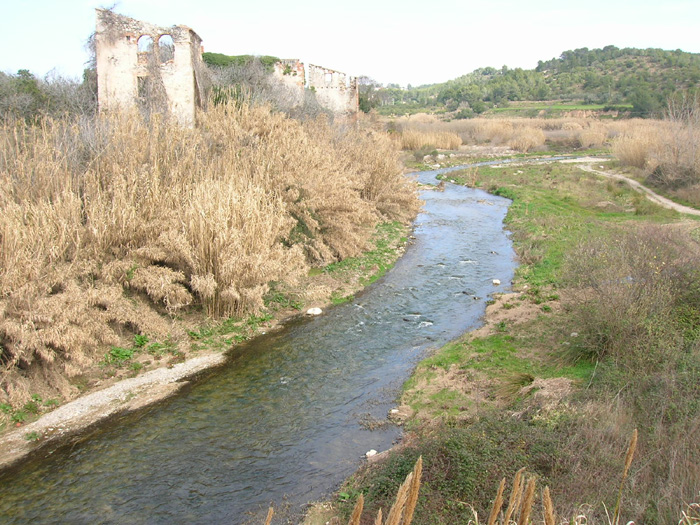
The Francolí flowing by some ancient Roman ruins

The Francolí (Eastern Catalan: [frəŋkuˈli], Western Catalan: [fraŋkoˈli]) is a river in Catalonia. Its source is in the Prades Mountains and it flows into the Mediterranean Sea at Tarragona.

This river has a highly irregular flow. It can cause seasonal floods some of which, like the 1917 one, have caused widespread destruction in Tarragona. Its ancient Roman name was Tulcis.

== See also ==
- List of rivers of Catalonia
