= Margarida Gironella =

Catalan anarchist (1886–1964)

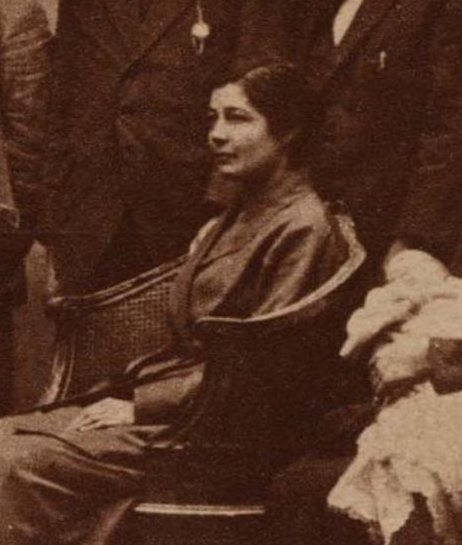
- Born: 1886; Darnius
- Died: 1964; Mexico City
- Occupation: Anarchist
- Spouse: Eusebi Carbó i Carbó

Margarida Gironella (1886–1964) was a Catalan anarchist. She was a founding member of the Confederación Nacional del Trabajo (CNT), and a militant of that same union before and during the Spanish Civil War. Her partner, Eusebi Carbó, was also a recognized anarchist of the period.

After the end of the war, the couple went into exile in France and then Mexico.

== Biography ==
Margarida Gironella was born in 1886 in Darnius. A Catalan, her education enabled her to learn Spanish and French. In 1910, she married Eusebi Carbó, a prominent anarcho-syndicalist of the period. They were introduced by the anarchist Hermos Plaja i Saló, who helped his friend. The future couple was already married, but Gironella declared that she was not happy, and Eusebi hardly knew his wife or son. They fled to France for a while before returning to Catalonia. From then on, the two were married in a public ceremony. The couple then settled in an anarchist district of Barcelona.

Gironella joined the Confederación Nacional del Trabajo as soon as it was founded. She was close to the movement's old guard, including Salvador Seguí, Ángel Samblancat, Simó Piera and Mauro Bajatierra. She was also close to the union's clandestine activities.

In 1939, the anarchist went into exile with her companion in Montpellier, France, and in 1943, in Mexico. Eusebi Carbó's death in 1958, after forty-eight years together, affected her deeply. She died in 1964 in Mexico.

== See also ==
- Anarchism in Spain
