= Boadella i les Escaules =

- Municipality
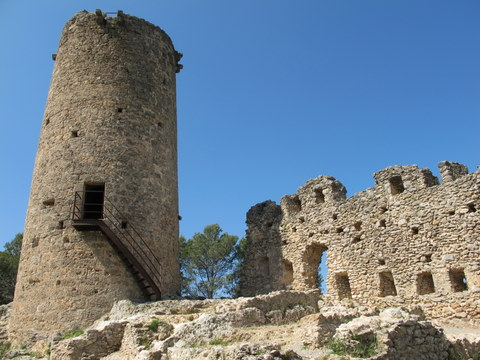
- Escaules castle

- Location in Catalonia Boadella i les Escaules (Spain)
- Coordinates: 42°19′53″N 2°51′25″E
- Country: Spain
- Community: Catalonia
- Province: Girona
- Comarca: Alt Empordà

Government
  - Mayor: Frederic Minobis Egido (2015)

Area
  - Total: 10.8 km^{2} (4.2 sq mi)
- Elevation: 82 m (269 ft)

Population (2025-01-01)
  - Total: 262
  - Density: 24.3/km^{2} (62.8/sq mi)
- Demonym(s): Boadellenc, boadellenca, escaulenc, escaulenca
- Website: boadellailesescaules.cat

Boadella i les Escaules (Catalan pronunciation: [buəˈðeʎə j ləz əsˈkawləs]) is a municipality in the comarca of the Alt Empordà in Girona, Catalonia, Spain. The former name, Boadella d'Empordà, was changed in 2004 when the town of Les Escaules joined Boadella d'Empordà. It is situated in the valley of the Muga river, which is dammed to form the reservoir of Pantà de Boadella, a tourist attraction, and to generate hydroelectric power. Local roads link the village with Biure and Terrades.

== Demography ==
1900	1930	1950	1970	1986	2007
504	563	416	301	221	228
