= Salàs de Pallars =

- Municipality
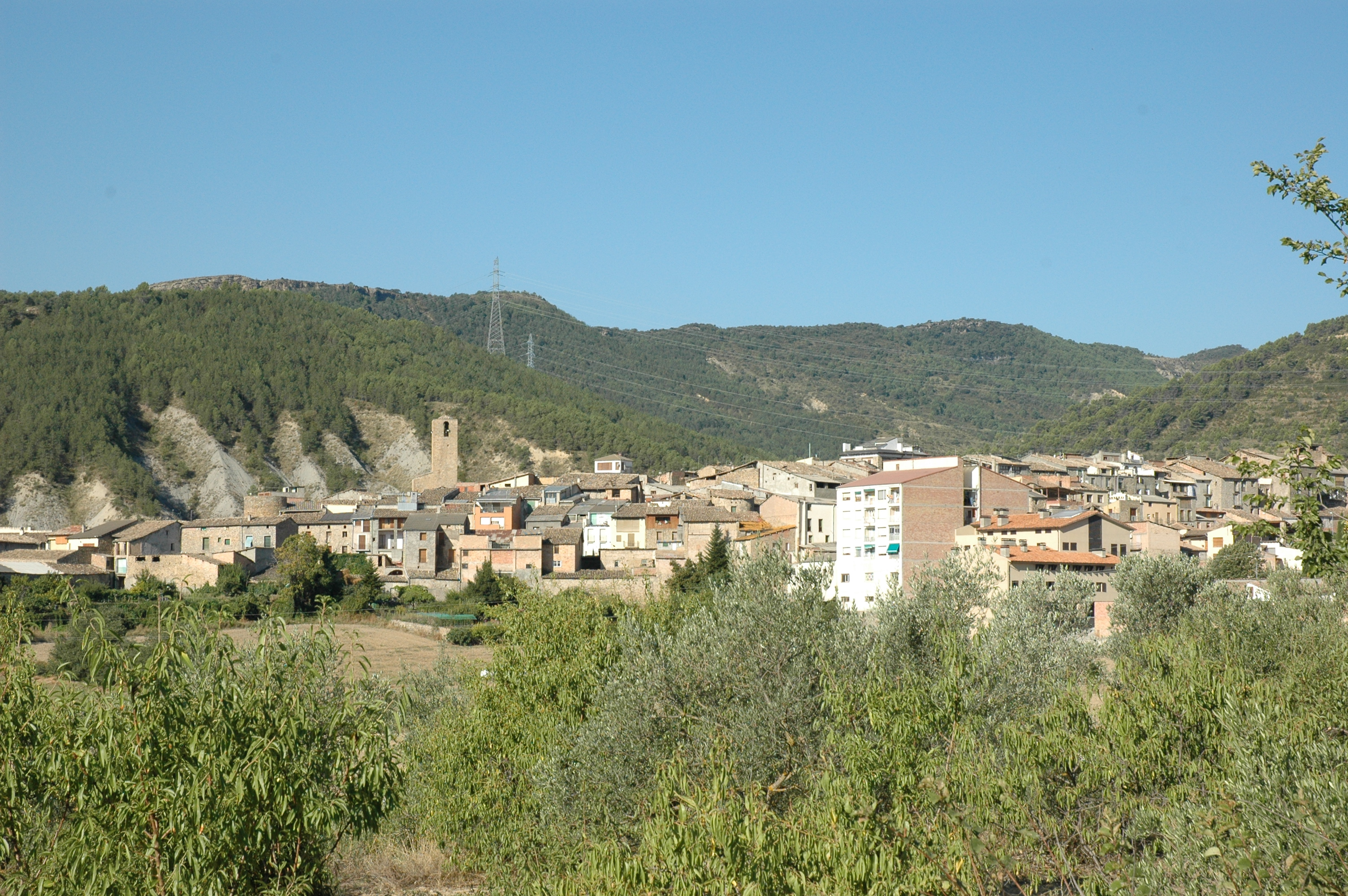
- Salàs de Pallars

- Coat of arms

- Location in Catalonia
- Coordinates: 42°12′52″N 0°55′57″E
- Country: Spain
- Community: Catalonia
- Province: Lleida
- Comarca: Pallars Jussà

Government
  - Mayor: Francesc Borrell Grau (2015)

Area
  - Total: 20.3 km^{2} (7.8 sq mi)

Population (2025-01-01)
  - Total: 365
  - Density: 18.0/km^{2} (46.6/sq mi)
- Website: salas.cat

Salas de Pallars (Catalan pronunciation: [saˈlaz ðe paˈʎas]) is a municipality in the comarca of the Pallars Jussà in Catalonia, Spain. It is about 8 km from Tremp and 5 km from Pobla de Segur. The town is served by the C-147 motorway. It has a population of 365 (register office, 2025).
