= Terrades =

- Municipality
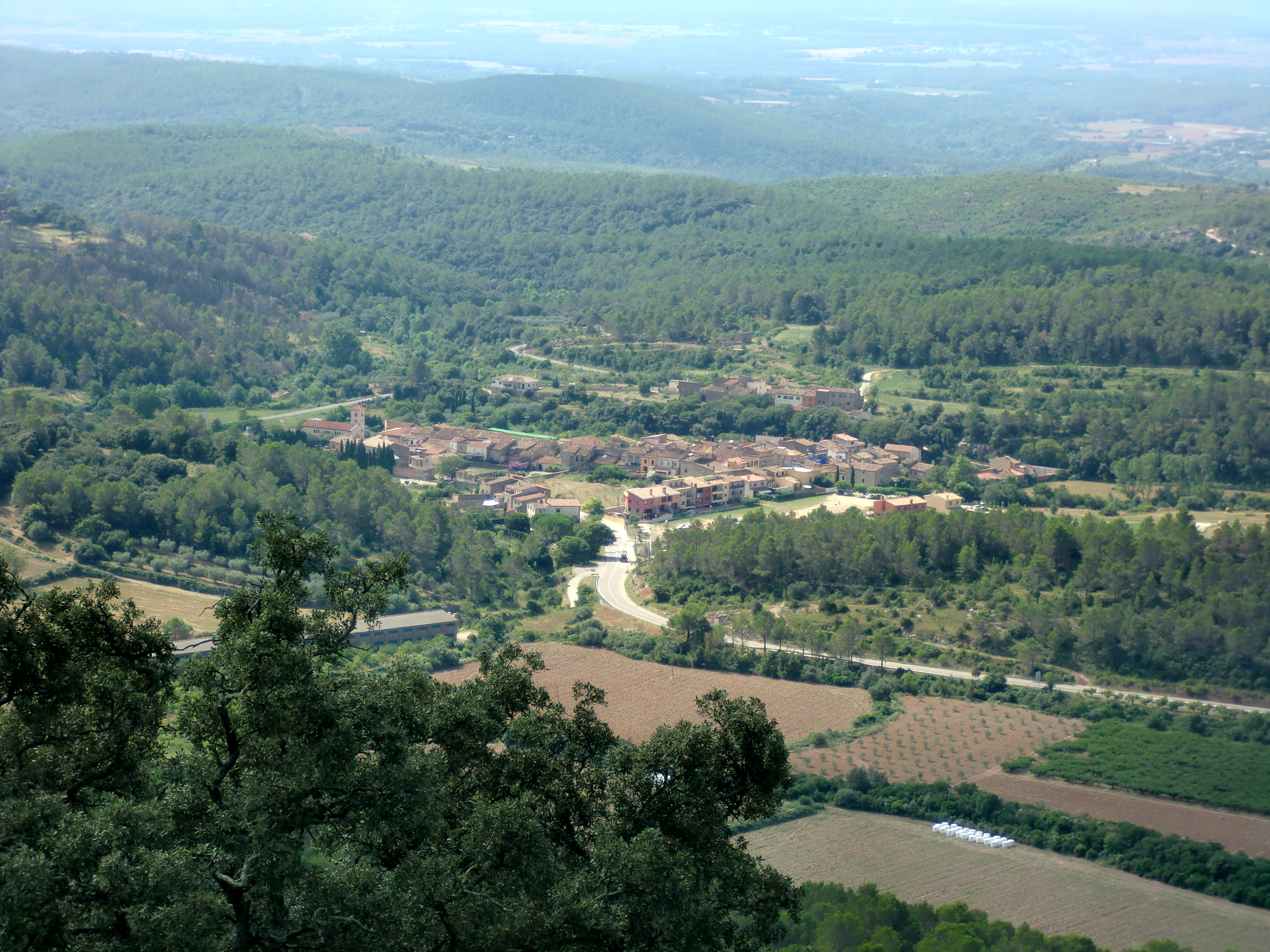
- View of Terrades, from mountain of Santa Magdalena

- Coat of arms

- Location in Catalonia Terrades (Spain)
- Coordinates: 42°18′37″N 2°50′22″E
- Country: Spain
- Community: Catalonia
- Province: Girona
- Comarca: Alt Empordà

Government
  - Mayor: Isidre Felip Isern (2015)

Area
  - Total: 21.0 km^{2} (8.1 sq mi)
- Elevation: 228 m (748 ft)

Population (2025-01-01)
  - Total: 337
  - Density: 16.0/km^{2} (41.6/sq mi)
- Demonym(s): Terradenc, terradenca
- Website: www.terrades.cat

Terrades (Catalan pronunciation: [təˈraðəs]) is a municipality in the comarca of the Alt Empordà in Catalonia, Spain. It is situated to the west of Figueres, above the valley of the Muga river, and is linked to the rest of the comarca by the GE-510 road.

== Demography ==
1900	1930	1950	1970	1986	2007
717	554	448	239	191	266
