= Castell de Mur =

- Municipality
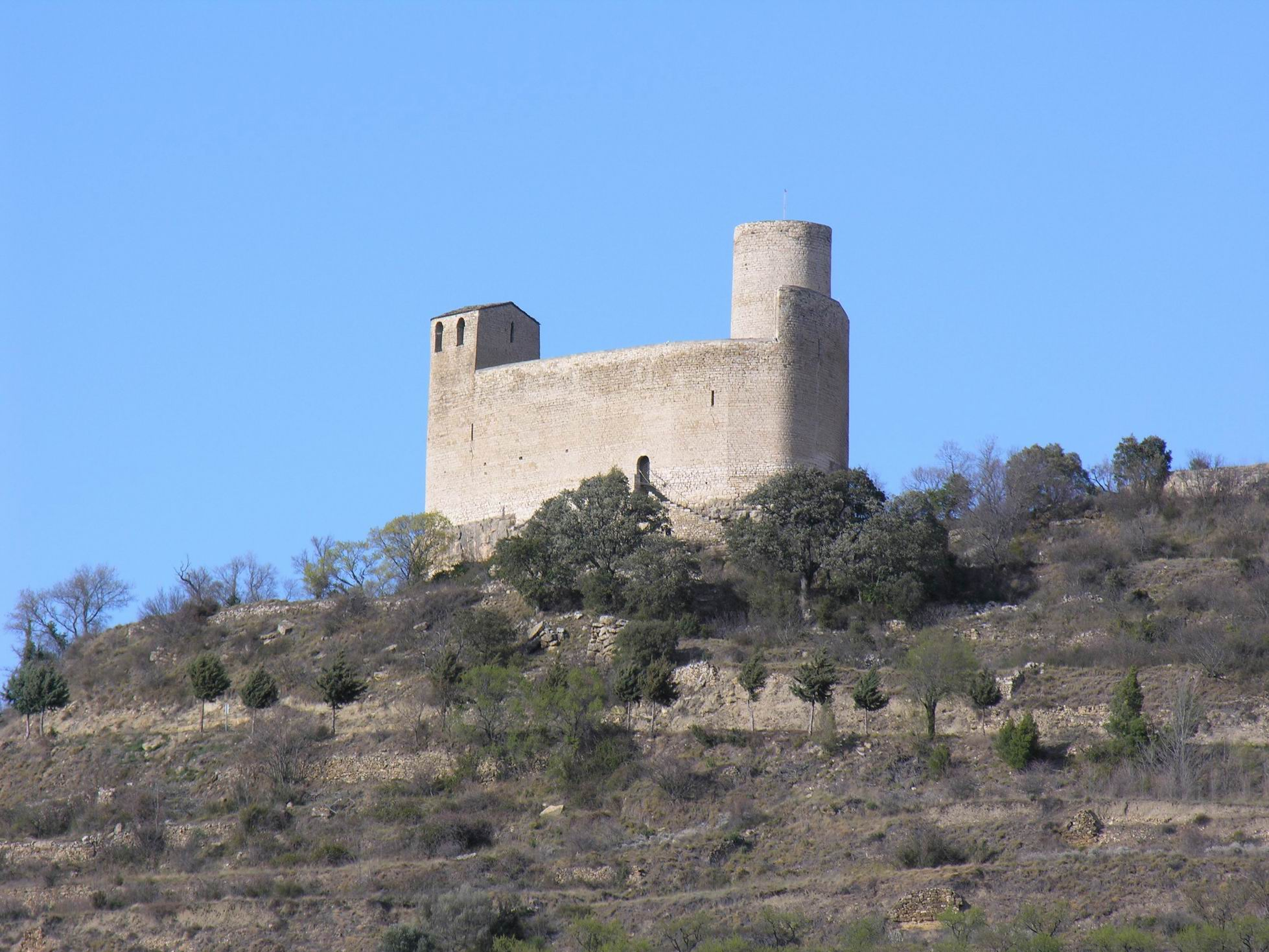
- Mur Castle, which gives its name to the municipality

- Coat of arms

- Location in Catalonia Castell de Mur (Catalonia) Castell de Mur (Spain)
- Coordinates: 42°5′39″N 0°52′42″E
- Country: Spain
- Community: Catalonia
- Province: Lleida
- Comarca: Pallars Jussà

Government
  - Mayor: Josep M. Mullol Miret (2015)

Area
  - Total: 62.4 km^{2} (24.1 sq mi)

Population (2025-01-01)
  - Total: 159
  - Density: 2.55/km^{2} (6.60/sq mi)
- Website: castellmur.cat

Castell de Mur (Catalan pronunciation: [kasˈteʎ de ˈmuɾ]) is a municipality in the province of Lleida and autonomous community of Catalonia, Spain.

It has a population of 159 (register office, 2025).
