= Abella de la Conca =

- Municipality
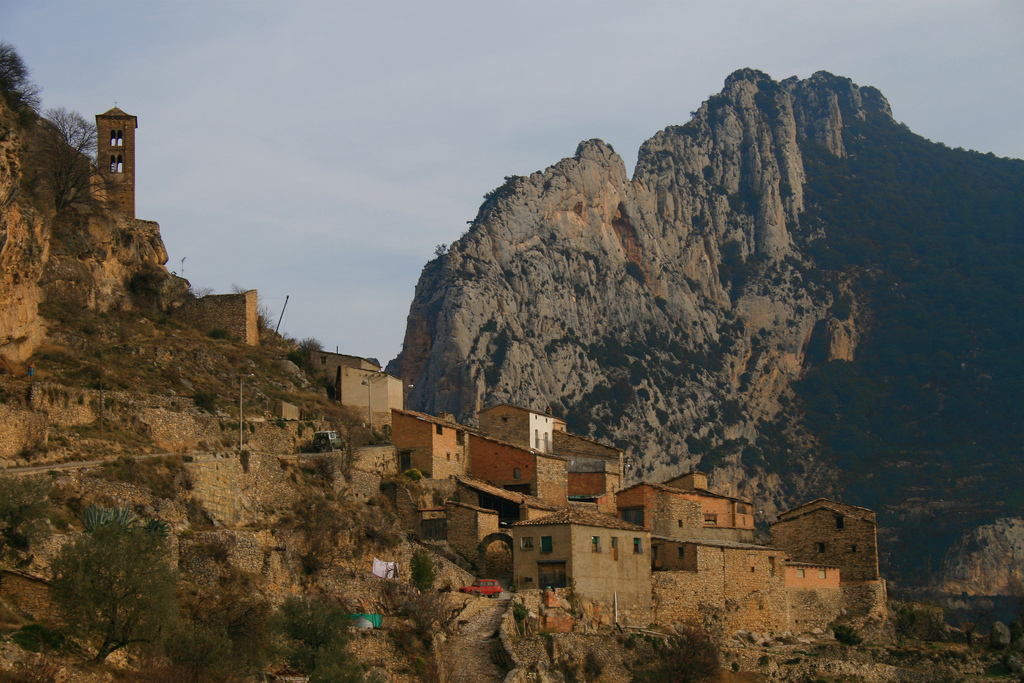
- Abella de la Conca

- Flag Coat of arms

- Location in Pallars Jussà county

- Location within Catalonia Location within Spain
- Coordinates: 42°09′47″N 1°05′34″E
- Sovereign state: Spain
- Community: Catalonia
- Region: Alt Pirineu
- County: Pallars Jussà
- Province: Lleida
- Established: 2007

Government
  - Mayor: Francesc Xavier Bernadó Vilana (ERC) (2023)

Area
  - Total: 78.3 km^{2} (30.2 sq mi)

Population (2025-01-01)
  - Total: 156
  - Density: 1.99/km^{2} (5.16/sq mi)
- Area code: 973
- Climate: Cfb
- Website: abellaconca.ddl.net

Abella de la Conca (Catalan pronunciation: [aˈβeʎɛ ðe la ˈkoŋkɛ]), or simply Abella, is a town and municipality in Pallars Jussà county, Province of Lleida, Catalonia, Spain. It has a population of 156 (register office, 2025).

It is situated on the eastern bank of the Tremp Basin. It comprises the high valleys of the Abella River tributary of the Conques river on its right bank and of the Rams River. The valley of the latter is sandwiched between the Boumort and Carreu mountains. In addition to the Tremp Basin, it comprises a section of the Puials River valley. A portion of the village houses are semi-excavated in the rock.

== History ==
The origins of the town of Abella de la Conca are formed around its castle, which was the center of its barony in the 11th century. It was located on top of the rock dominating the valley, where access to the Conca Dellà was controlled.

== Places of interest ==
- Sant Esteve Church in Abella de la Conca
- Santa Maria Church
- Sant Vicenç church of Bóixols
- Church of the Verge in Carránima
- Church of Sant Miquel in Abella de la Conca
- Church of the Holy Trinitat in Faidella
- Church of Santa Maria in Mas Palou
- Church of Sant Antoni in La Rua
- Molí del Plomall
- Ruins of the Abella de la Conca Castle

== Population entities ==
Population entities	Inhabitants (2009)
Abella de la Conca	115
Bòixols	45
Rúa (la)	23
Carreu	0
Torra (la)	0

=== Population change ===
Population change
1900	1930	1950	1970	1981	1986
779	530	471	275	184	161
