= La Torre de Cabdella =

- Municipality
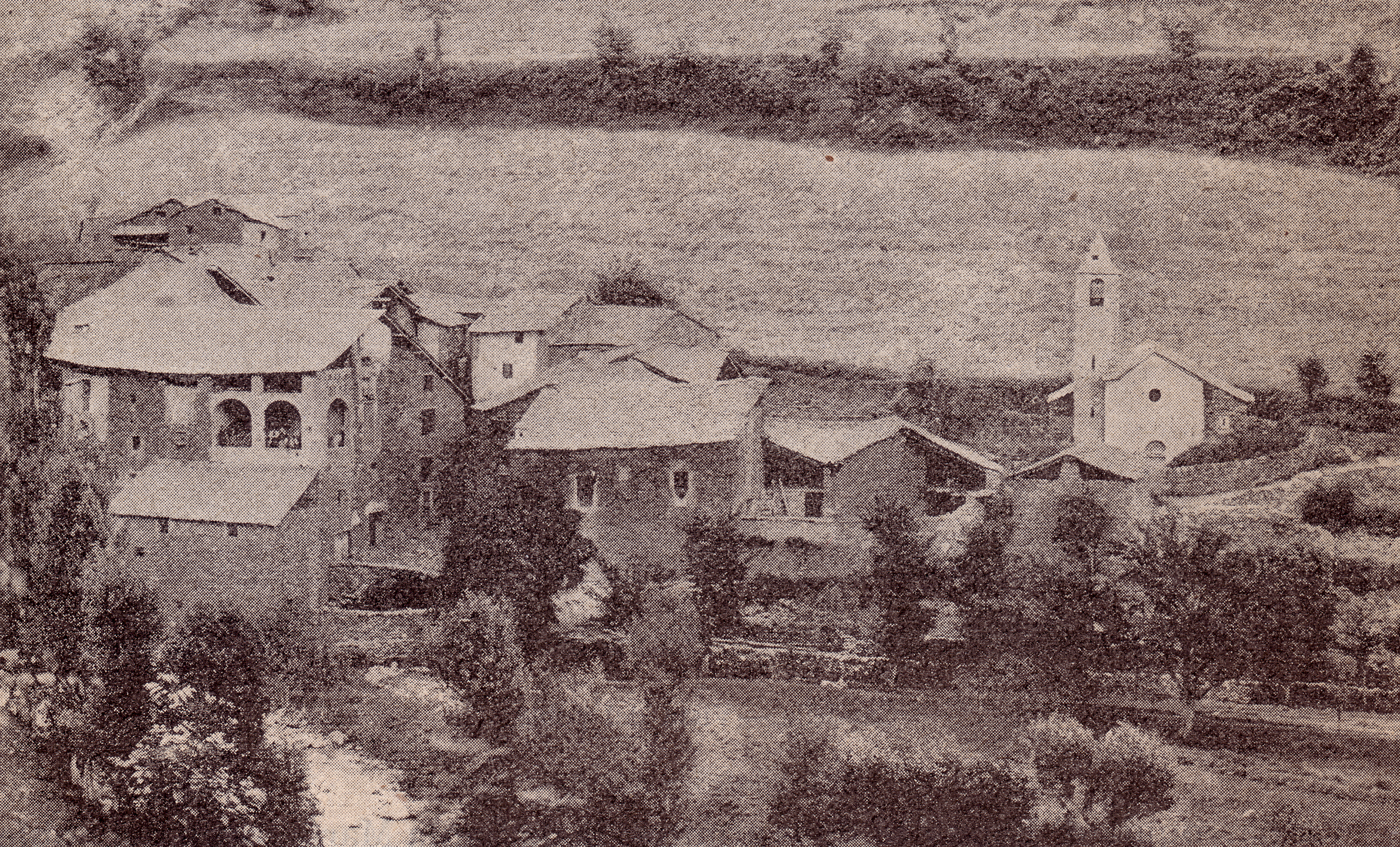
- La Torre de Cabdella, c. 1910

- Flag Coat of arms

- Location in Catalonia
- Coordinates: 42°25′26″N 0°59′0″E
- Country: Spain
- Community: Catalonia
- Province: Lleida
- Comarca: Pallars Jussà

Government
  - Mayor: Josep Maria Dalmau Gil (2015)

Area
  - Total: 165.3 km^{2} (63.8 sq mi)

Population (2025-01-01)
  - Total: 758
  - Density: 4.59/km^{2} (11.9/sq mi)
- Website: www.torredecapdella.org

La Torre de Cabdella (Catalan pronunciation: [la ˈtore ðe kabˈdeʎa]) or La Torre de Capdella is a village in the province of Lleida and autonomous community of Catalonia, Spain.

It has a population of 758 (register office, 2025).

== See also ==
- Cabdella Lakes
