= Llimiana =

- Municipality
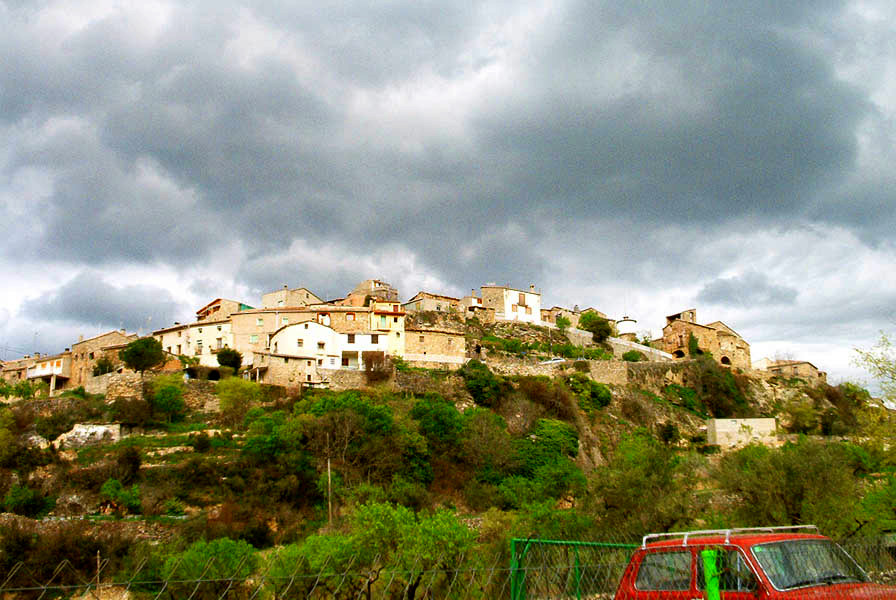
- Llimiana

- Flag Coat of arms

- Location in Catalonia
- Coordinates: 42°4′N 0°55′E
- Country: Spain
- Community: Catalonia
- Province: Lleida
- Comarca: Pallars Jussà

Government
  - Mayor: Josep Terré Escolà (2015)

Area
  - Total: 41.7 km^{2} (16.1 sq mi)

Population (2025-01-01)
  - Total: 130
  - Density: 3.1/km^{2} (8.1/sq mi)
- Website: llimiana.cat

Llimiana (Catalan pronunciation: [ʎimiˈanɛ]) is a village in the province of Lleida and autonomous community of Catalonia, Spain. The municipality includes a small exclave to the east. It has a population of 130 (register office, 2025).
