= Sarroca de Bellera =

- Municipality
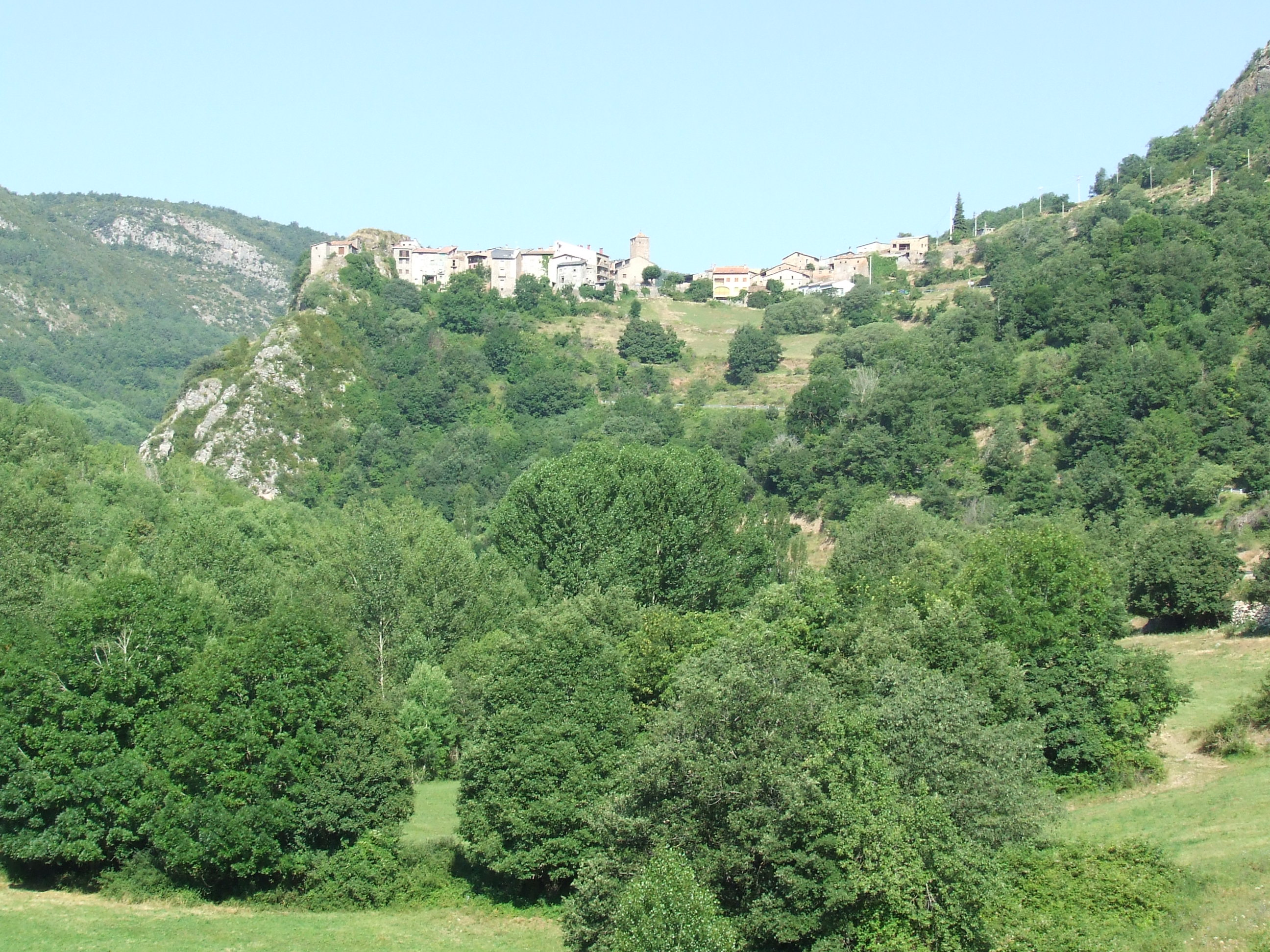

- Flag Coat of arms

- Location in Catalonia
- Coordinates: 42°21′34″N 0°52′51″E
- Country: Spain
- Community: Catalonia
- Province: Lleida
- Comarca: Pallars Jussà

Government
  - Mayor: Josep Ramon Lloret Loan (2015)

Area
  - Total: 87.5 km^{2} (33.8 sq mi)

Population (2025-01-01)
  - Total: 111
  - Density: 1.27/km^{2} (3.29/sq mi)
- Website: sarrocabellera.cat

Sarroca de Bellera (Catalan pronunciation: [saˈrɔka ðe βeˈʎeɾa]) is a village in the province of Lleida and autonomous community of Catalonia, Spain. It has a population of 111 (register office, 2025).
