= Sant Esteve de la Sarga =

- Municipality
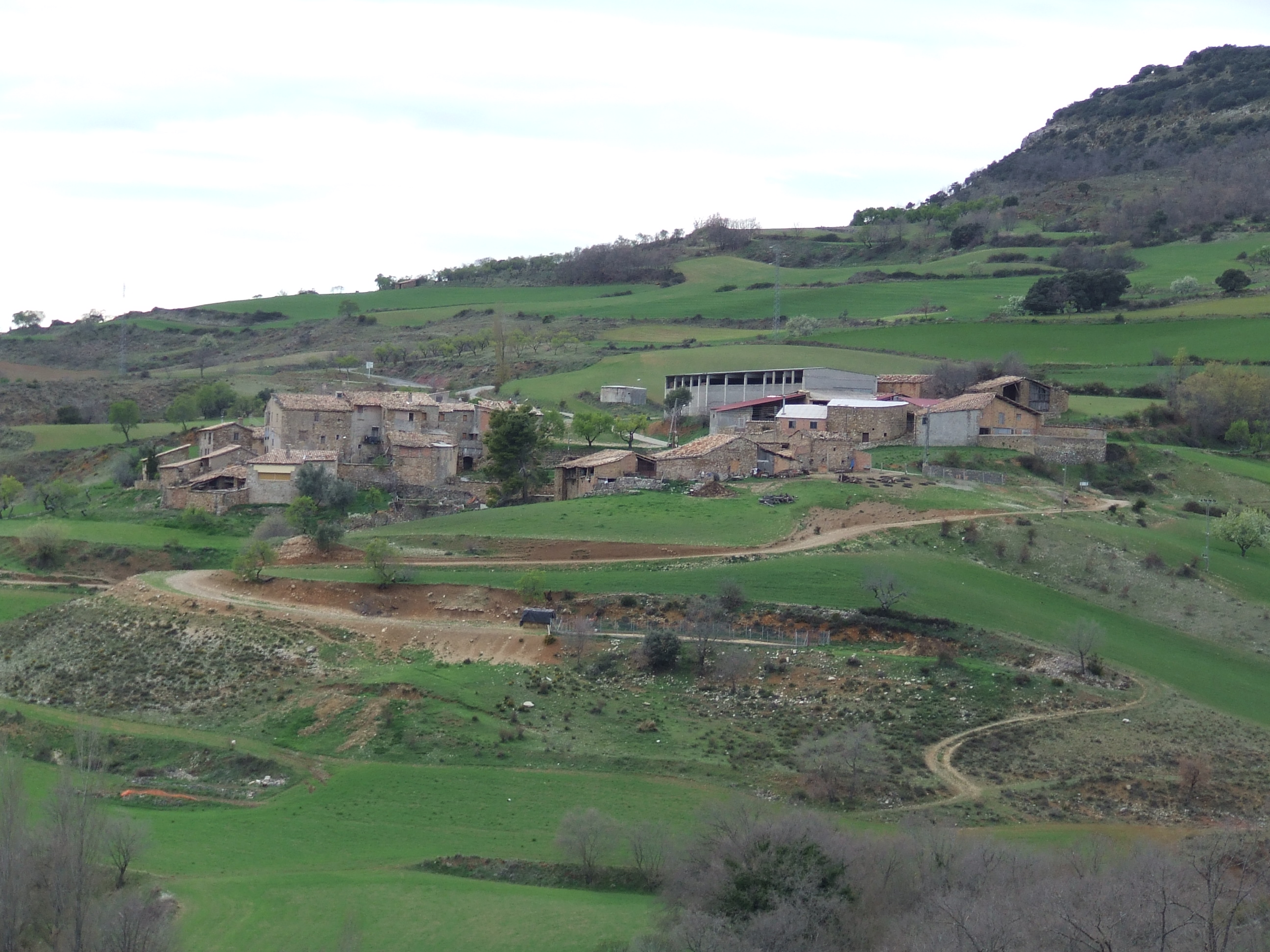
- Sant Esteve de la Sarga

- Coat of arms

- Location in Catalonia
- Coordinates: 42°4′54″N 0°45′52″E
- Country: Spain
- Community: Catalonia
- Province: Lleida
- Comarca: Pallars Jussà

Government
  - Mayor: Jordi Navarra Torres (2015)

Area
  - Total: 92.9 km^{2} (35.9 sq mi)

Population (2025-01-01)
  - Total: 121
  - Density: 1.30/km^{2} (3.37/sq mi)
- Website: santesteve.cat

Sant Esteve de la Sarga (Catalan pronunciation: [ˌsantasˈteβe ðe la ˈsaɾɣɛ]) is a village in the province of Lleida and autonomous community of Catalonia, Spain. It has a population of 121 (register office, 2025).
