= Noguera Pallaresa =

River in Catalonia, Spain

Coordinates: 41°54′22″N 0°53′25″E

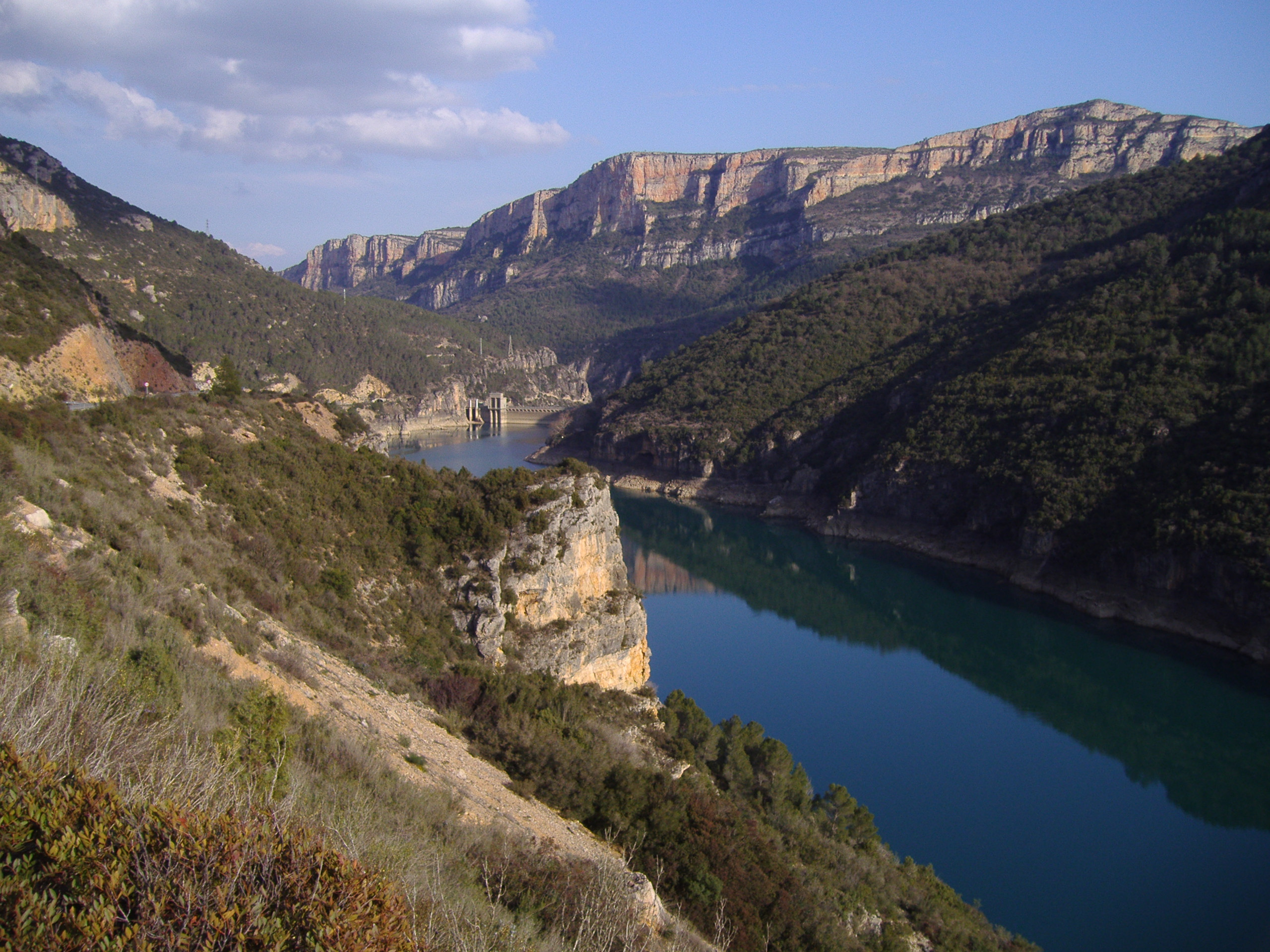
Camarasa reservoir in the Noguera Pallaresa river

The Noguera Pallaresa (Catalan pronunciation: [nuˈɣeɾə pəʎəˈɾɛzə]; Occitan: Noguèra Palharesa, IPA: [nuˈɣɛɾɔ paʎaˈɾezɔ]) is a river in Catalonia, Spain.

It is named after the Pallars region.

== Course ==
Its source is at Era Font d'era Noguereta in the municipality of Naut Aran (Aran Valley) at an elevation of about 2,000 metres (6,600 ft) and barely 100 metres (330 ft) from those of the Garonne. While the Garonne flows toward the Atlantic Ocean, the Noguera Pallaresa flows to the Segre, and enters that river from the right just before the reservoir of Camarasa (Noguera): its waters then flow to the Mediterranean. The Noguera Pallaresa is dammed at several points, including Talarn Dam, and the largest reservoirs are La Torassa (between Esterri d'Àneu and La Guingueta d'Àneu in the Pallars Sobirà), Sant Antoni (above Talarn in the Pallars Jussà), Terradets (in the municipality of Àger in the Noguera) and Camarasa (just above the confluence with the Segre).

== Wildwater sports ==
Between the dam in the reservoir Panta de la Torrassa and the lake Panta de Sant Antoni the river is a favourite course for wildwater canoeing and rafting. During spring and summer the river falls dry at night, but in the morning the weir is opened and in several hours makes it a rather voluminous river with wild water class 2, 3 and 4 rapids. In the evening the weir is closed again.

== See also ==
- List of rivers of Spain
- Cabdella Lakes
