= Talarn =

- Municipality
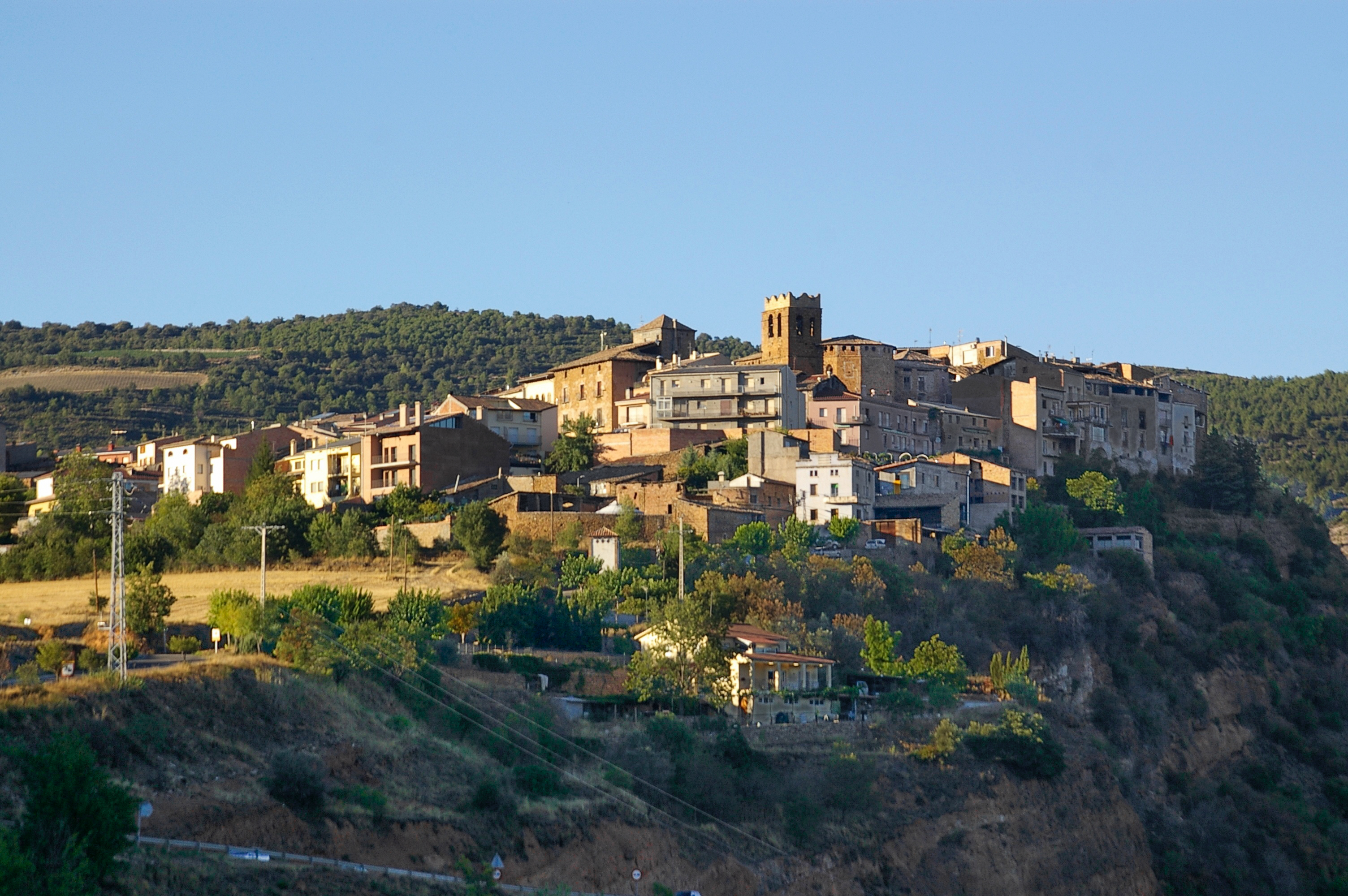

- Coat of arms

- Location in Catalonia
- Coordinates: 42°11′N 0°54′E
- Country: Spain
- Community: Catalonia
- Province: Lleida
- Comarca: Pallars Jussà

Government
  - Mayor: Lluis Oliva Díaz (2015)

Area
  - Total: 28.0 km^{2} (10.8 sq mi)
- Elevation: 572 m (1,877 ft)

Population (2025-01-01)
  - Total: 555
  - Density: 19.8/km^{2} (51.3/sq mi)
- Website: talarn.cat

Talarn (Catalan pronunciation: [taˈlaɾn]) is a municipality in the comarca of the Pallars Jussà in Catalonia, Spain. It is situated in the centre of the Tremp basin, on the Noguera Pallaresa river below the Sant Antoni reservoir. It is the site of a hydroelectric power station and of a training school of the Spanish army (Academia Básica de Suboficiales). The town is served by the C-147 road between Tremp and La Pobla de Segur.

Talarn was originated on a hill around the former castle. It was an important fortified place and the chief town of the area of Pallars in 1453. The arms (see image) show a wall, the enclosure around the town (at present day there are some remains of it), and the royal arms of Catalonia-Aragon (four pales Gules on Or), alluding to the royal jurisdiction (in 1370 the right to have a fair and market was given by the king, and the town had a representation in the Catalan Parliament). These arms were officially granted on 25 July 1991.

== Demography ==
It has a population of 555 (register office, 2025).

1900	1930	1950	1970	1986	2007
596	528	423	537	385	382
