= Pallars Jussà =

Coordinates: 42°16′44″N 0°55′49″E

- Comarca
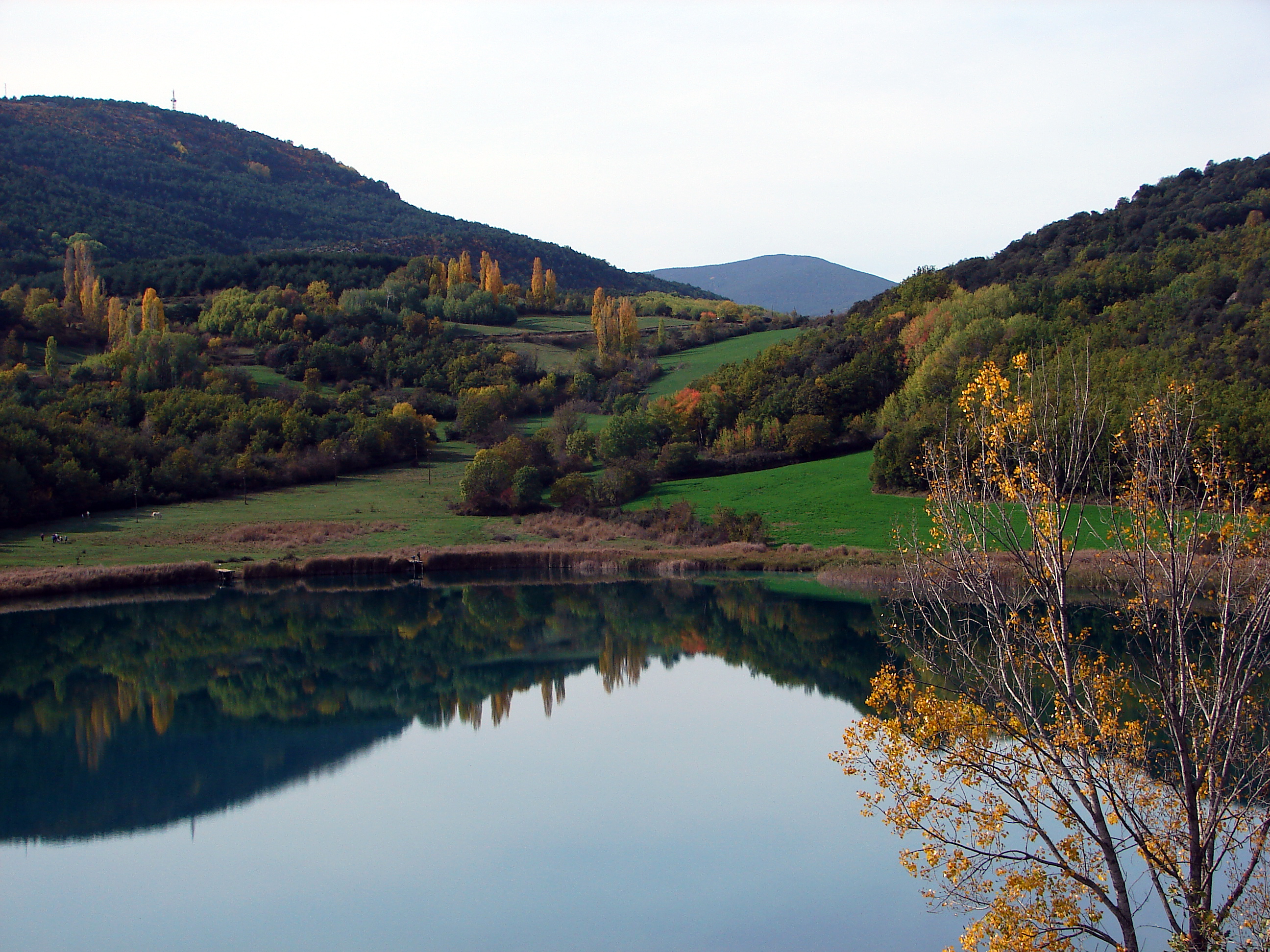
- The Montcortès lake

- Coat of arms

- Country: Spain
- Autonomous community: Catalonia
- Province: Lleida
- Region: Alt Pirineu
- Capital: Tremp
- Municipalities: List: Abella de la Conca, Castell de Mur, Conca de Dalt, Gavet de la Conca, Isona i Conca Dellà, Llimiana, La Pobla de Segur, Salàs de Pallars, Sant Esteve de la Sarga, Sarroca de Bellera, Senterada, Talarn, La Torre de Cabdella, Tremp

Government
  - Body: Pallars Jussà Comarcal Council
  - President: Ramon Jordana (ERC)

Area
  - Total: 1,343.2 km^{2} (518.6 sq mi)

Population (2005)
  - Total: 13,530
  - Density: 10.07/km^{2} (26.09/sq mi)
- Demonym
- Time zone: UTC+1 (CET)
  - Summer (DST): UTC+2 (CEST)
- Largest municipality: Tremp
- Website: www.pallarsjussa.cat

Pallars Jussà (Western Catalan: [paˈʎa(ɾ)z ʒuˈsa]) is a comarca (county) in Alt Pirineu, Catalonia, Spain. It was established as a comarca in 1936, out of the old county of Pallars. The name is an archaism meaning "Lower Pallars"; to the northeast and into the mountains is Pallars Sobirà. Its capital and largest municipality is Tremp.

== Municipalities ==
Municipality	Population (2014)	Area km^{2}
Abella de la Conca	170	78.3
Castell de Mur	163	62.4
Conca de Dalt	443	166.5
Gavet de la Conca	303	90.9
Isona i Conca Dellà	1,049	139.4
Llimiana	159	41.7
La Pobla de Segur	3,012	32.8
Salàs de Pallars	365	20.3
Sant Esteve de la Sarga	132	92.9
Sarroca de Bellera	124	87.5
Senterada	131	34.4
Talarn	413	28.0
La Torre de Cabdella	761	165.3
Tremp	6,305	302.8
• Total: 14	13,530	1,343.2

== See also ==
- County of Pallars Jussà
- Cabdella Lakes
