= Senterada =

- Municipality
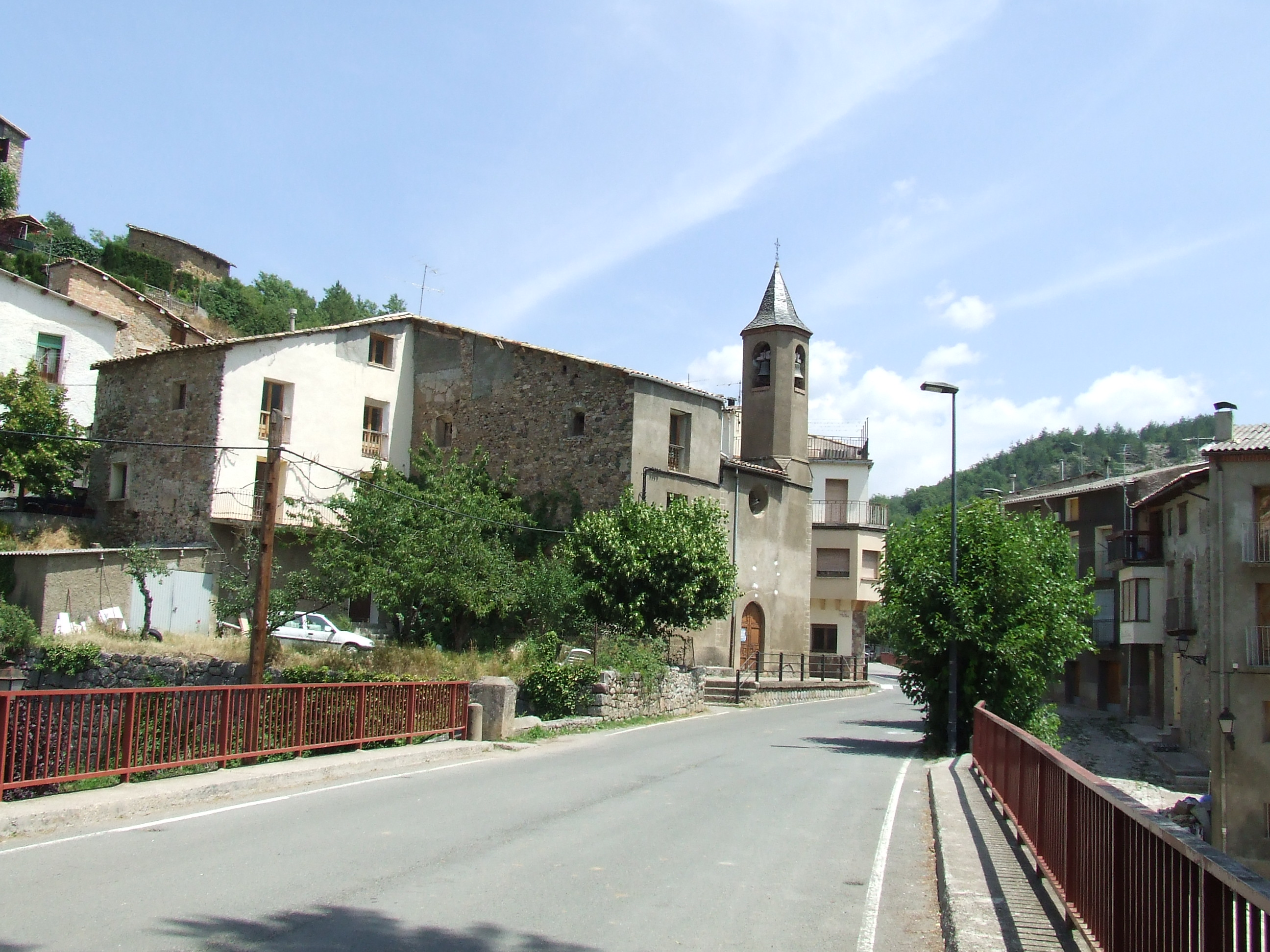
- Centre of Senterada

- Flag Coat of arms

- Location in Catalonia
- Coordinates: 42°19′35″N 0°56′19″E
- Country: Spain
- Community: Catalonia
- Province: Lleida
- Comarca: Pallars Jussà

Government
  - Mayor: Antoni Toló Cierco (2015)

Area
  - Total: 34.4 km^{2} (13.3 sq mi)

Population (2025-01-01)
  - Total: 160
  - Density: 4.7/km^{2} (12/sq mi)
- Website: senterada.cat

Senterada (Catalan pronunciation: [senteˈɾaða]) is a village in the province of Lleida and autonomous community of Catalonia, Spain. The municipality includes a small exclave to the north. It has a population of 160 (register office, 2025).

== History ==
Remains from Prehistory include the dolmens of the Casa Encantada and Mas Pallarès, the Dolmen of Sant Roc, or Cabaneta del Moro, in Cérvoles, and the Cabana del Moro, in Reguard.

The Visigothic monastery of Santa Grata is the origin of the current town of Senterada, as a population must have formed around the monastery, which, when the original monastery disappeared, adopted its church as a parish church. Furthermore, Senterada sits was a crossroads of important communication routes and the confluence of the Bòssia and Flamisell rivers helped growth of the town.

In the fire of 1381, Senterada is mentioned within the barony of Bellera.

In 1553, five fires took place in Sancterada.

In 1718 it had passed into the hands of the barons of Sant Vicenç, like the whole barony of Bellera, and the Dukes of Cardona.

In 1831, at the end of the Old Regime, it was the domain of the Marquis of La Manresana, heir to the Belleras and the Sant Vicençs. In all the historic documents the town of Larén always appears with Senterada.

In Pascual Madoz's Diccionario geográfico, from 1845, it is said that

Senterada is a village with a healthy climate located within the valley where the rivers of Vall de Capdella and Sarroca meet, forming the Flamisell. It is sheltered from the north winds by a mountain. Madoz says there were 12 houses in the village. The terrain is rough, broken, loose and of poor quality. There could be 150 working days. The harvest consisted of wheat, rye, barley, little fruit and a gypsum mine. There is trout and barbel fishing, three looms and a bathrobe. The population was 6 neighbors (heads of household) and 51 souls (inhabitants).

Around 1900, Senterada had 265 buildings, with 466 inhabitants in fact and 480 in law, of which 54 houses with 126 people were in Senterada itself. At that time there was a boys and girls school, in which these children shared a classroom in a wide age range.

== Demography ==
The following data from Senterada are from the late Middle Ages and the first centuries of modern times:

- about 180 inhabitants in 1497,
- 50 in 1515
- 34 in 1553.
- 226 in 1718
- 313 in 1787.
- 798 in 1860 it reached an all-time high:
- 466 in 1900,
- 412 in 1950,
- 359 in 1960,
- 204 in 1970,
- 167 in 1975,
- 163 in 1981,
- 108 in 1992,
- 102 in 2002,
- 126 in 2006,

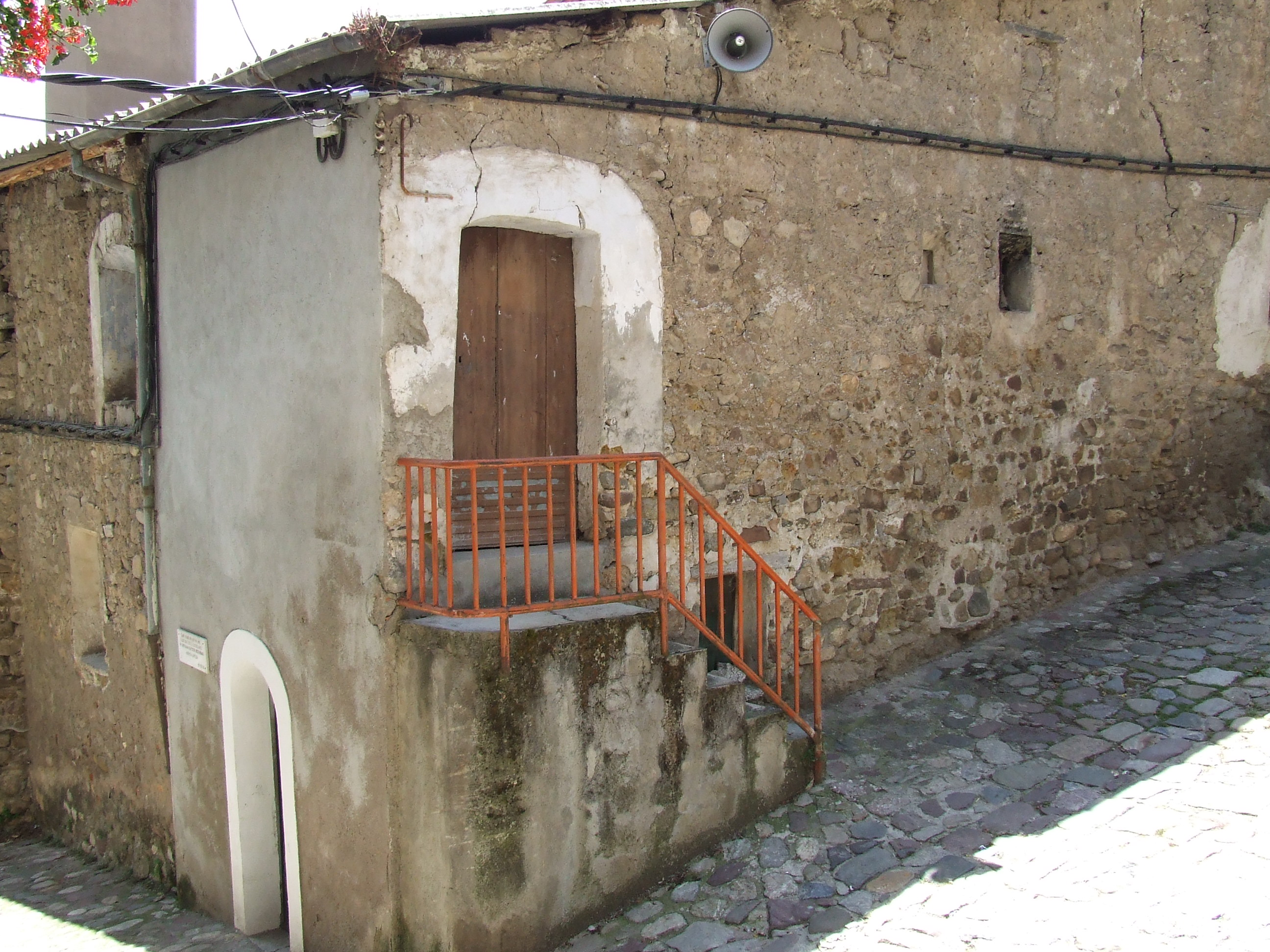
Senterada. L'església

== Santa Grata de Senterada ==
Santa Grata de Senterada was a pre-Romanesque and Romanesque monastery in the village of Senterada, in the Pallars Jussà region. It was located on the north side of the parish church of Santa Maria de Gràcia de Senterada. The chapel in its current state is modern, but on its own walls and other surrounding walls, there are rows of stones of a clear medieval character.
