= Gavet de la Conca =

- Municipality
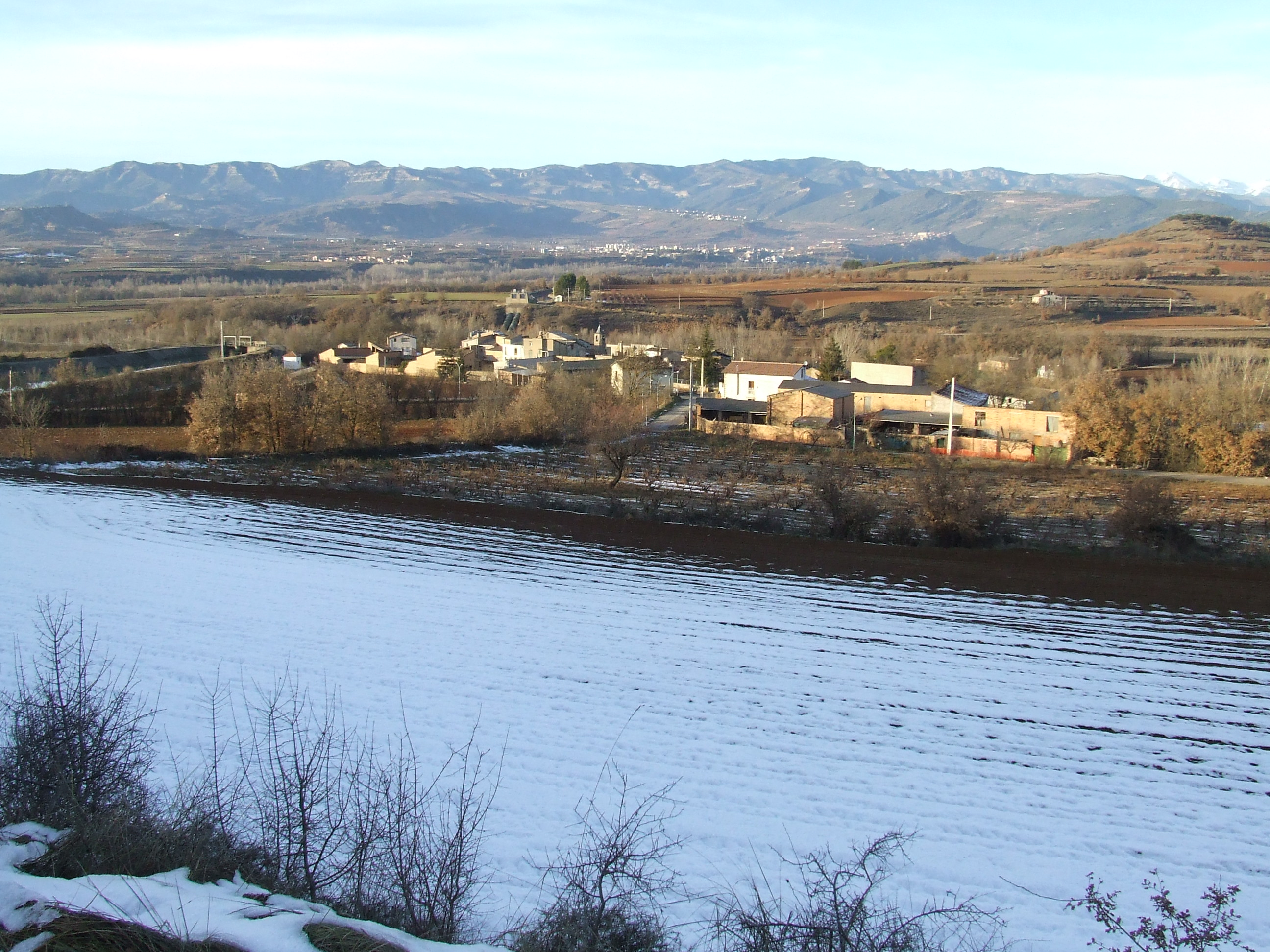
- Gavet village

- Coat of arms

- Location in Catalonia
- Coordinates: 42°7′30″N 0°55′18″E
- Country: Spain
- Community: Catalonia
- Province: Lleida
- Comarca: Pallars Jussà

Government
  - Mayor: Josep Durany Galera (2015)

Area
  - Total: 90.9 km^{2} (35.1 sq mi)

Population (2025-01-01)
  - Total: 252
  - Density: 2.77/km^{2} (7.18/sq mi)
- Website: gavet.ddl.net

Gavet de la Conca (Catalan pronunciation: [gaˈβed de la ˈkoŋkɛ]) is a village in the province of Lleida and autonomous community of Catalonia, Spain.

It has a population of 252 (register office, 2025).
