= Muga (river) =

River in Spain

Coordinates: 42°18′49.55″N 2°55′42.44″E

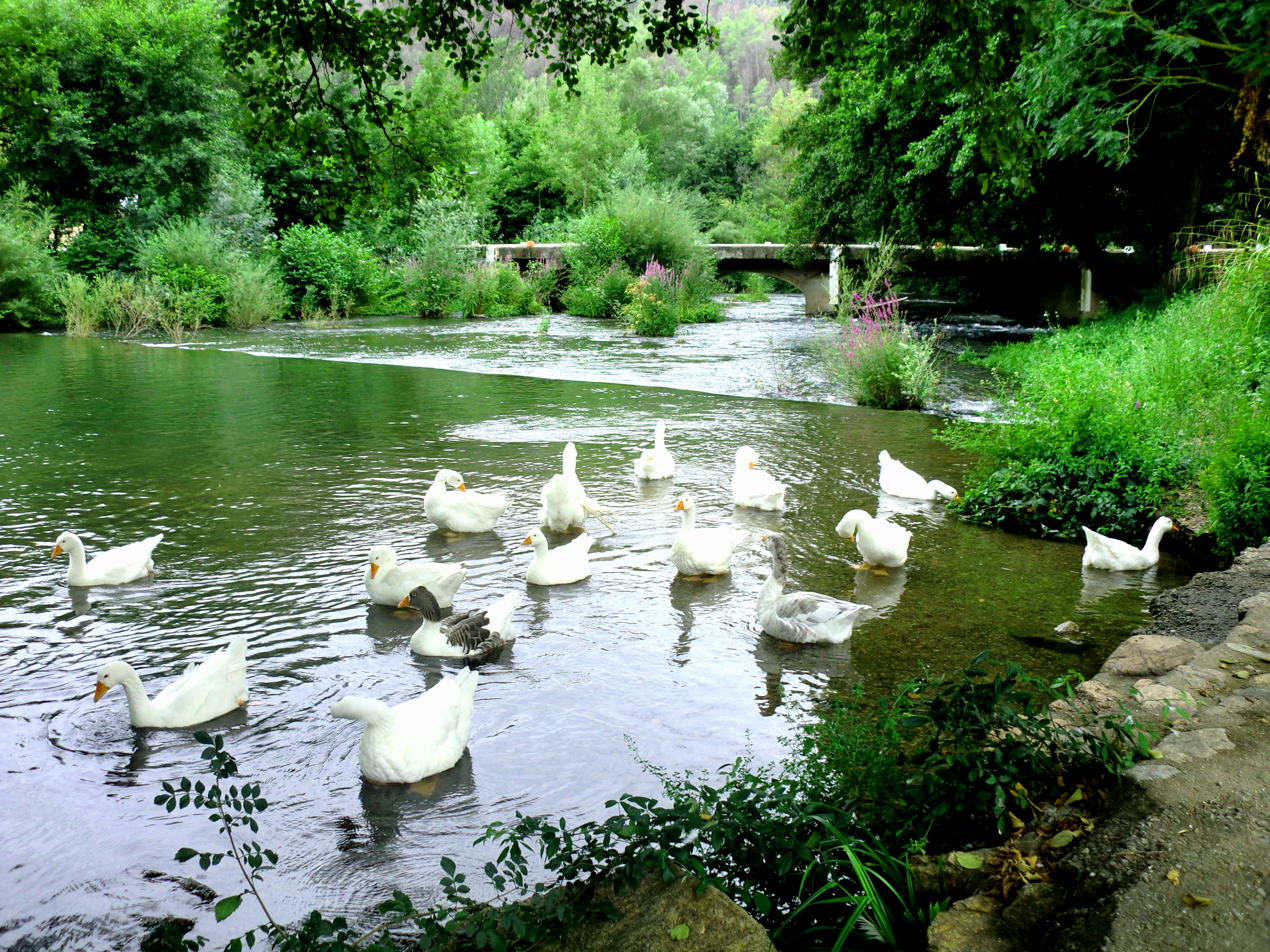
The Muga at Boadella d'Empordà

The Muga (Catalan pronunciation: [ˈmuɣə]) is a river in Catalonia, Spain, that rises in the mountains of the eastern Pyrenees. It enters the Mediterranean Sea at the Roses Gulf.

The river is 58 kilometres (36 mi) long. Its source is below the summit of Mont Negre, elevation 1,425 metres (4,675 ft), which is in the French commune of Serralongue. The river passes through the village of Pont de Molins and passes through the Darnius-Boadella Reservoir, where the river is dammed.

The Muga Valley was entrusted to the County of Empúries by Ramon Berenguer III after being in the County of Besalú. The local population suffered in both the Peninsular War and Spanish Civil War.

== See also ==
- List of rivers of Spain
