= Darnius =

- Municipality
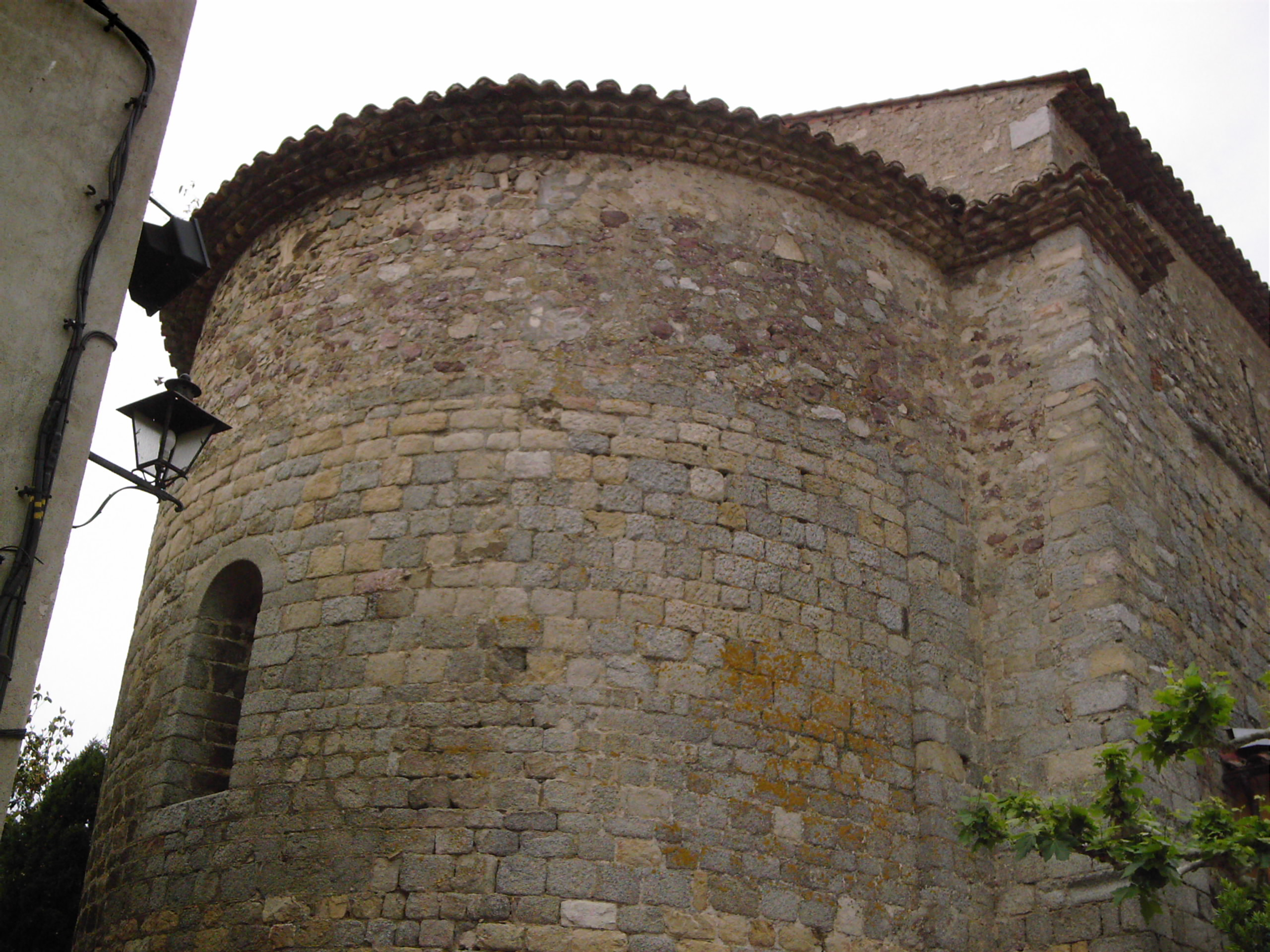
- Darnius church

- Coat of arms

- Location in Catalonia Darnius (Spain)
- Coordinates: 42°22′9″N 2°50′4″E
- Country: Spain
- Community: Catalonia
- Province: Girona
- Comarca: Alt Empordà

Government
  - Mayor: José Maderm Ciria (2015)

Area
  - Total: 34.9 km^{2} (13.5 sq mi)
- Elevation: 193 m (633 ft)

Population (2025-01-01)
  - Total: 563
  - Density: 16.1/km^{2} (41.8/sq mi)
- Demonym(s): Darniuenc, darniuenca
- Website: www.darnius.cat

Darnius (Catalan pronunciation: [dəɾˈniws]) is a municipality in the comarca of the Alt Empordà in Girona, Catalonia, Spain. The first document where is related Darnius was dated in 983, and the written name was Darnicibus. Until the beginning of the 20th century, the main economic activity was the manufacturing of the cork.

== Interesting places ==
- Dòlmen del Mas Puig de Caneres (Megalithic monument)
- Església de Santa Maria
- Ermita de Sant Esteve del Llop
- Castell de Mont-roig
- Pantà de Darnius/Boadella (Reservoir)
