= Monteixo =

Mountain in the Spanish Pyrenees

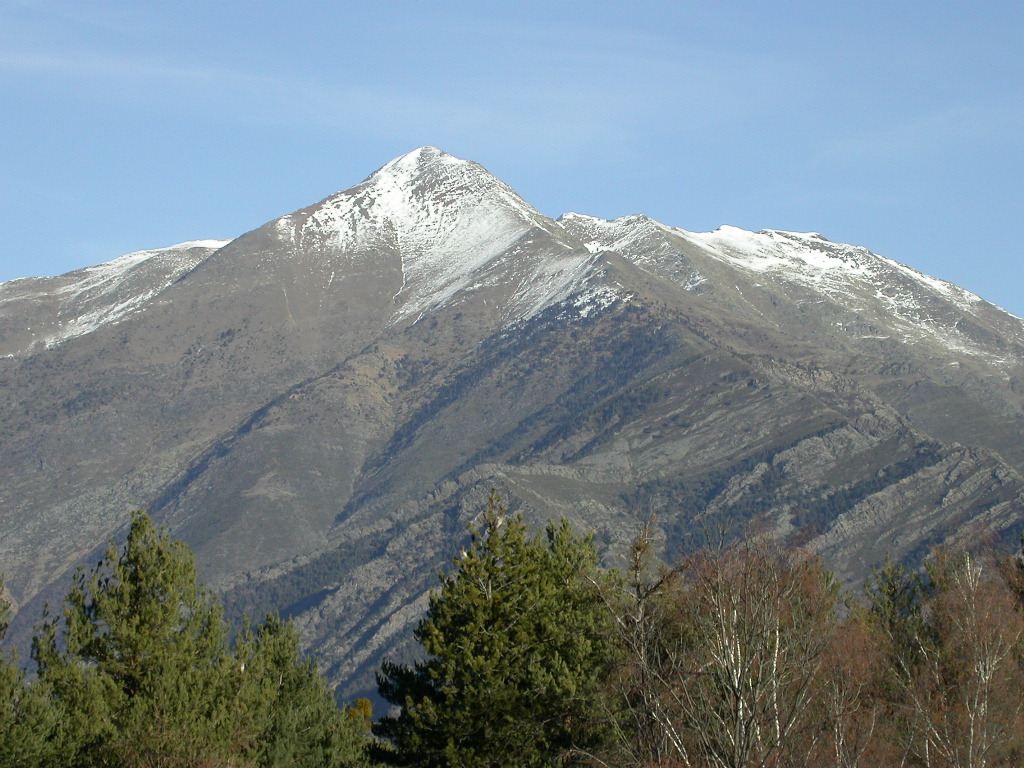

Highest point
- Elevation: 2,905 m (9,531 ft)
- Coordinates: 42°36′6.28″N 1°21′41.60″E

Geography
- Location within Pyrenees
- Location: Pallars Sobirà, Catalonia
- Parent range: Pyrenees

Climbing
- First ascent: Unknown
- Easiest route: From Alins

Monteixo is a mountain of Catalonia, Spain. Located in the Pyrenees, it has a height of 2905 metres.

The village of Àreu is located at the foot of the mountain.

Together with Pic de Norís (2820 m) and Lo Sentinella (2562 m), Monteixo is part of a mountain chain that surrounds Lake d'Aixeus, a glacial lake at an altitude of 2400m.

== See also ==
- Mountains of Catalonia
- County of Pallars
