= Tor, Pallars =

Village in Alins, Pallars Sobirà, Catalonia, Spain

Coordinates: 42°34′14″N 1°23′54″E

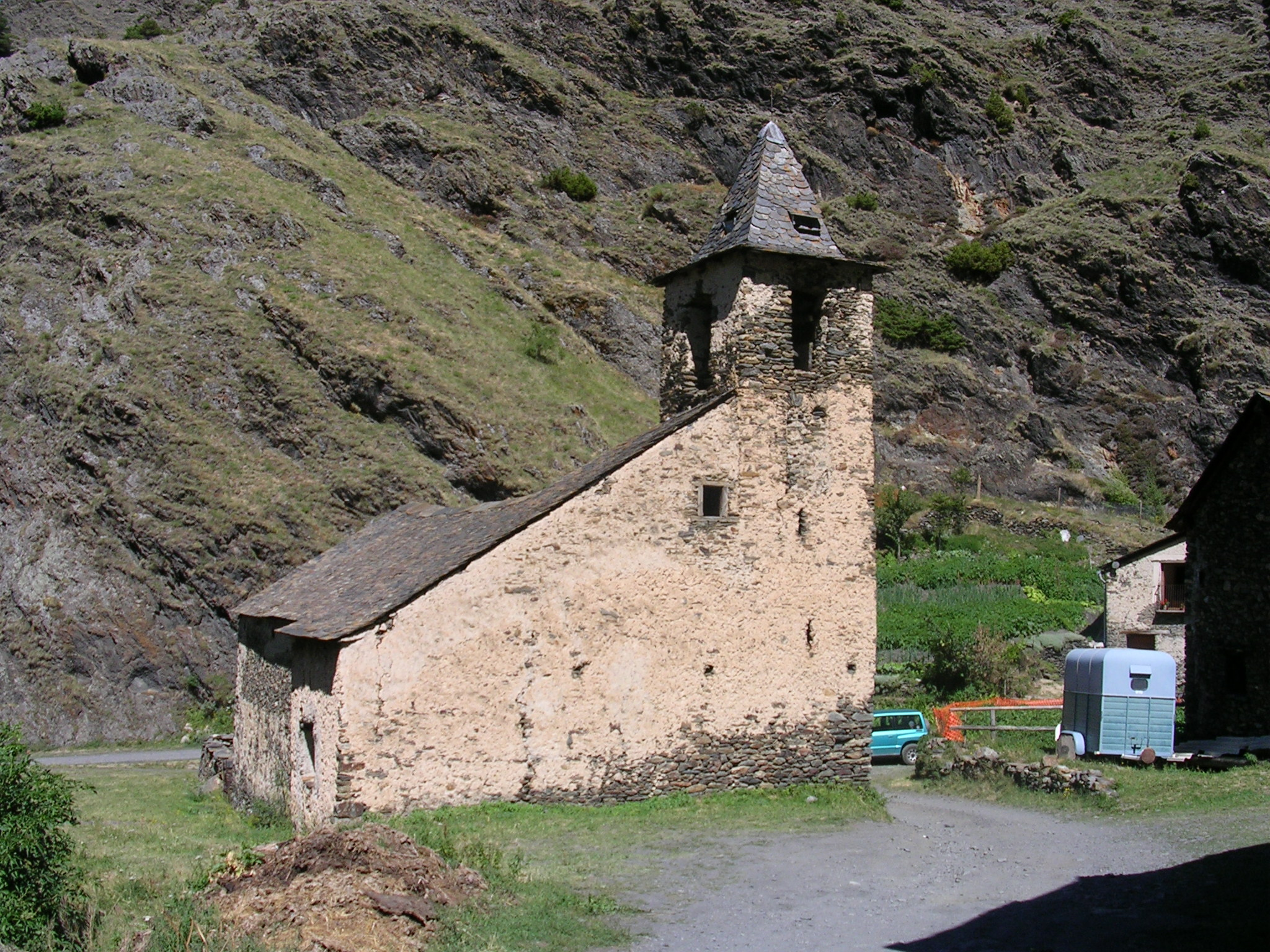
Sant Pere de Tor church in Tor

Tor is a village within the Alins municipality of the Pallars Sobirà in Catalonia, Spain. Its municipal boundary borders with Andorra close to the spot in La Massana parish where the Vallnord ski resort complex, formed by Pal and Arinsal, is located.

This small village had only 25 inhabitants in 2005. It is located in the Pyrenees, close to the Port de Cabús mountain pass at an altitude of 2,301 metres (7,549 ft).

Tor was formerly a place where much tobacco product cross-border smuggling took place. Recently, during the Spanish real estate bubble Tor also became notorious for a local conflict about the ownership of a particular mountain within its municipal boundary, close to the Andorra border. This conflict triggered greed among local families and became the cause of three murders, following which a book Tor: tretze cases i tres morts (Tor: thirteen houses and three dead), by Carles Porta, was published.
