= Pic de l'Estany Fondo =

- Location within Pyrenees

Highest point
- Elevation: 2,813 m (9,229 ft)
- Coordinates: 42°39′12.44″N 1°23′40.19″E

Geography
- Location: Pallars Sobirà, Catalonia
- Parent range: Pyrenees

Climbing
- First ascent: Unknown
- Easiest route: From Alins

Pic de l'Estany Fondo is a mountain of Catalonia, Spain. Located in the Pyrenees, it has an elevation of 2,813 metres (9,229 ft) above sea level.

== See also ==
- List of mountains in Catalonia
