= Tuc del Caubo =

Mountain of Catalonia, Spain

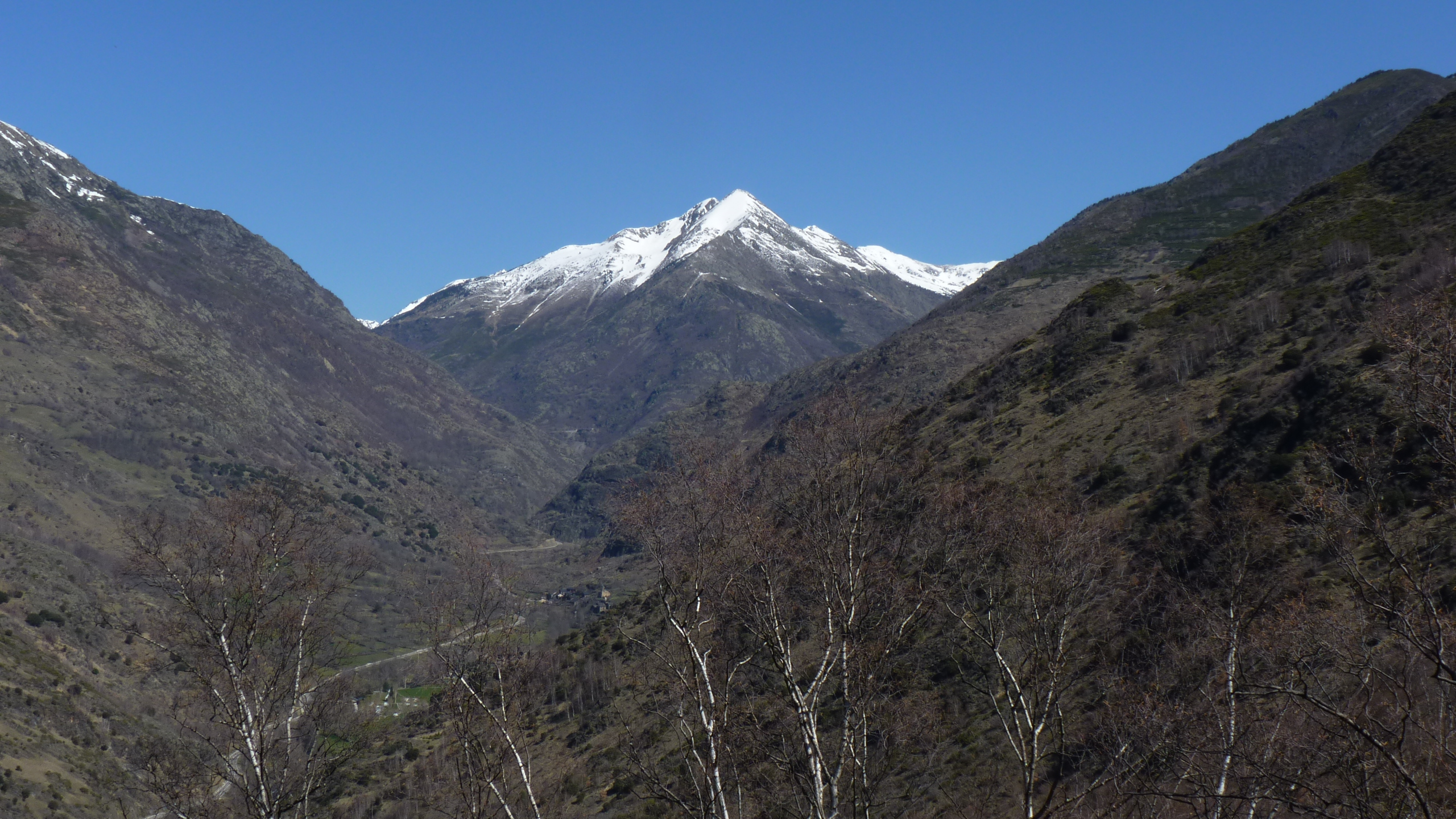

Highest point
- Elevation: 2,570 m (8,430 ft)
- Coordinates: 42°40′25.27″N 1°15′49.06″E

Geography
- Location within Pyrenees
- Location: Pallars Sobirà, Catalonia, Spain
- Parent range: Pyrenees

Climbing
- First ascent: Unknown
- Easiest route: From Lladorre

Tuc del Caubo is a mountain of Catalonia, Spain. Located in the Serra de Costuix, Pyrenees, it has an elevation of 2,570 metres above sea level.

== See also ==
- Mountains of Catalonia
