= Alt Àneu =

- Municipality
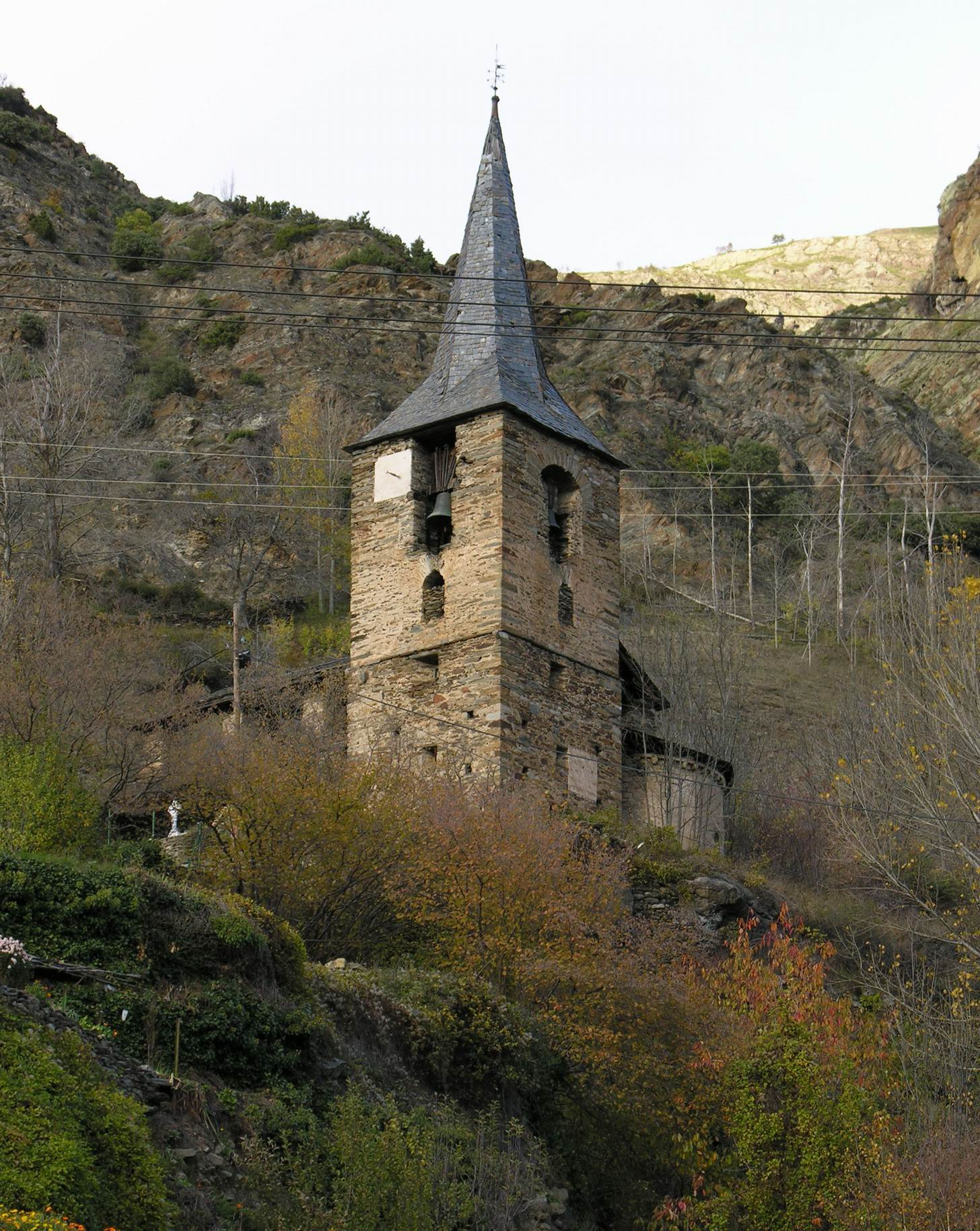
- Sant Llorenç church in Isavarre

- Flag Coat of arms

- Location in Pallars Sobirà county

- Location within Catalonia Location within Spain
- Coordinates: 42°38′07″N 1°06′40″E
- Sovereign state: Spain
- Community: Catalonia
- Region: Alt Pirineu
- County: Pallars Sobirà
- Province: Lleida

Government
  - Mayor: Laura Tristán (ERC (2015)

Area
  - Total: 217.8 km^{2} (84.1 sq mi)
- Elevation: 1,076 m (3,530 ft)

Population (2025-01-01)
  - Total: 453
  - Density: 2.08/km^{2} (5.39/sq mi)
- Website: www.altaneu.cat

Alt Àneu (Catalan pronunciation: [ˈalt ˈanew]) is a town and municipality in Pallars Sobirà county in the Province of Lleida, Catalonia, Spain. It was created in 1970 as a result of the union of the former municipalities of Isil, Son, Sorpe, and Valencia d'Àneu, plus the addition of the Commonwealth of the Four Villages.

It is the largest municipality in Catalonia in terms of area at 1,913.79 square kilometres (738.92 sq mi), with a population of 453 (register office, 2025). It is situated by the Noguera Pallaresa river, and is served by the C-13 road, which links it with county capital Sort and to the Aran Valley over the Port de la Bonaigua (2072 m). The ajuntament (town hall) is in València d'Àneu.

== Subdivisions ==
The municipality of Alt Àneu is formed by nine villages. Populations are given as of 2005:

- Alòs d'Isil (34)
- Àrreu (6)
- La Bonaigua (16)
- Borén (25), on the left bank of the Noguera Pallaresa
- Isavarre (25)
- Isil (85), in the upper valley
- Son (46)
- Sorpe (42)
- València d'Àneu (175), on the right bank of the Noguera Pallaresa

== Demography ==
It has a population of 453 (register office, 2025).

1900	1930	1950	1970	1986	2007
1146	1078	800	480	333	450

== Bibliography ==
- Panareda Clopés, Josep Maria; Rios Calvet, Jaume; Rabella Vives, Josep Maria (1989). Guia de Catalunya, Barcelona: Caixa de Catalunya. ISBN 84-87135-01-3 (Spanish). ISBN 84-87135-02-1 (Catalan).
