= Olp, Lleida =

Coordinates: 42°25′49″N 1°06′52″E

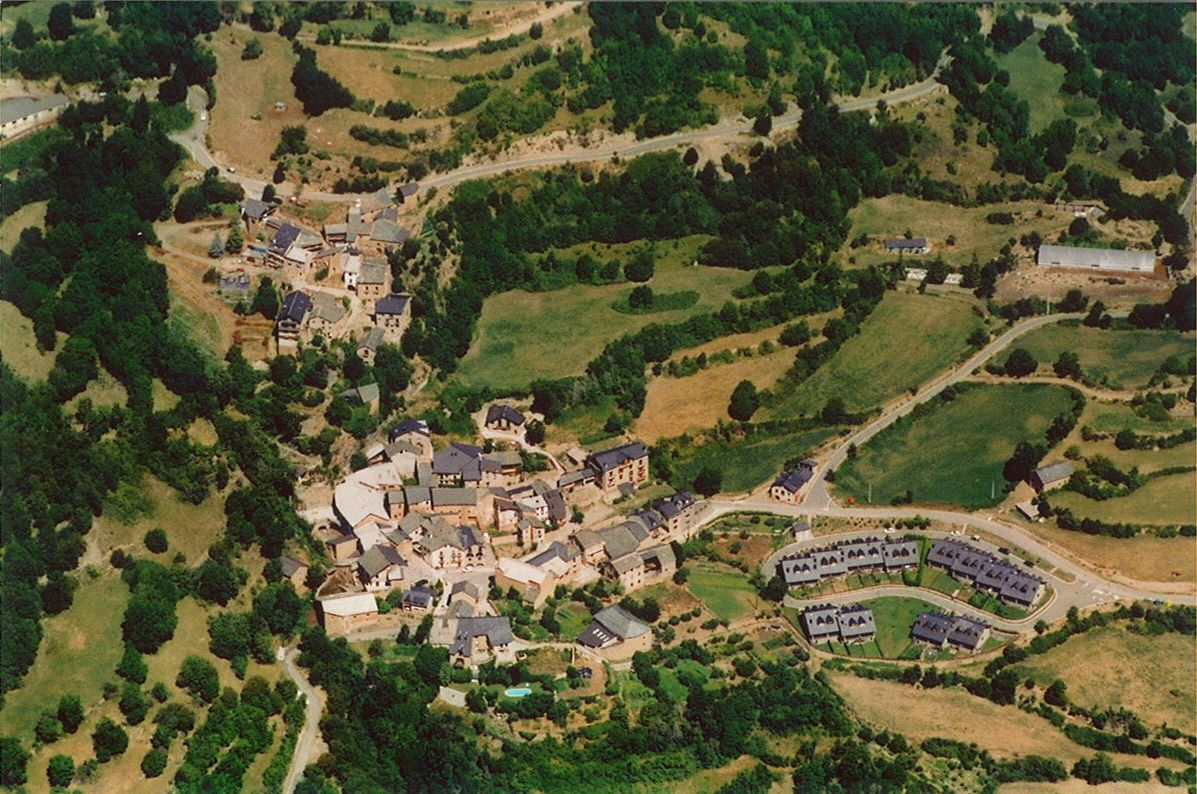
Olp village, Pallars Sobirà

Olp is a hamlet within Sort municipal term, Pallars Sobirà, Catalonia, Spain.

This hamlet had only 46 inhabitants in 2006. It is located in the Pyrenees, at an altitude between 1,000 and 1,150 m.
