= Mencui =

Village in Soriguera, Spain

Coordinates: 42°22′49″N 1°2′34″E

Mencui is a village in the municipality Soriguera, located in the comarca of Pallars Sobirà, in Catalonia, Spain. It lies at an altitude of 1.256 m. Six women and three men were officially reported as inhabitants as of January 2007.

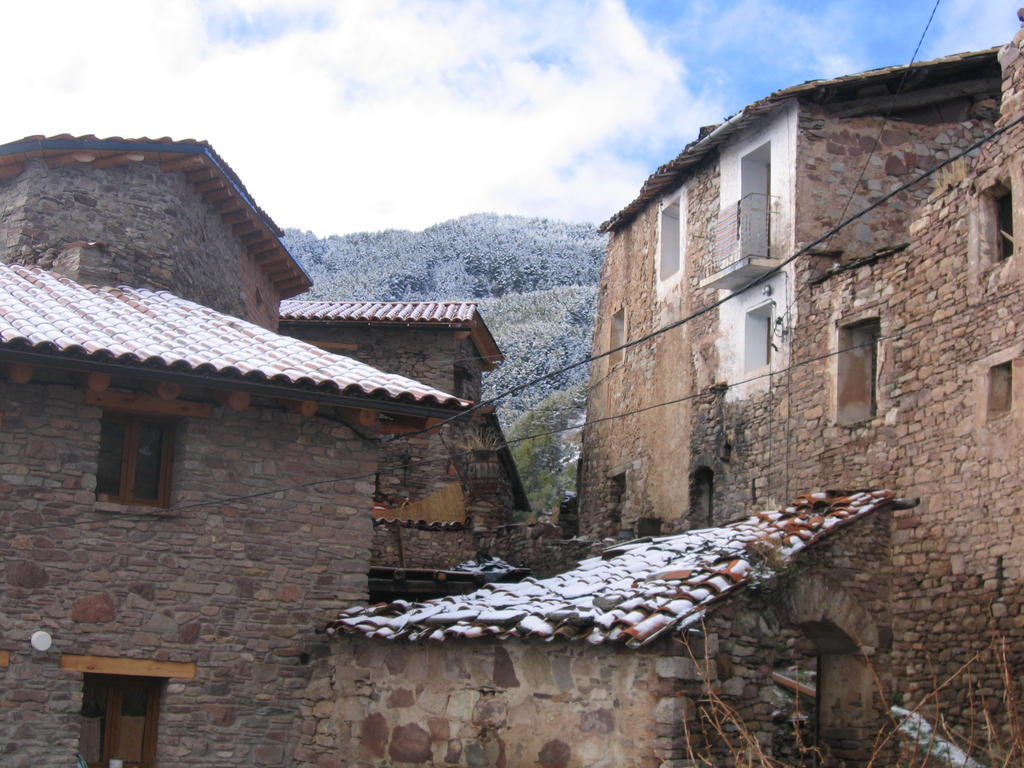
Mencui, Detail

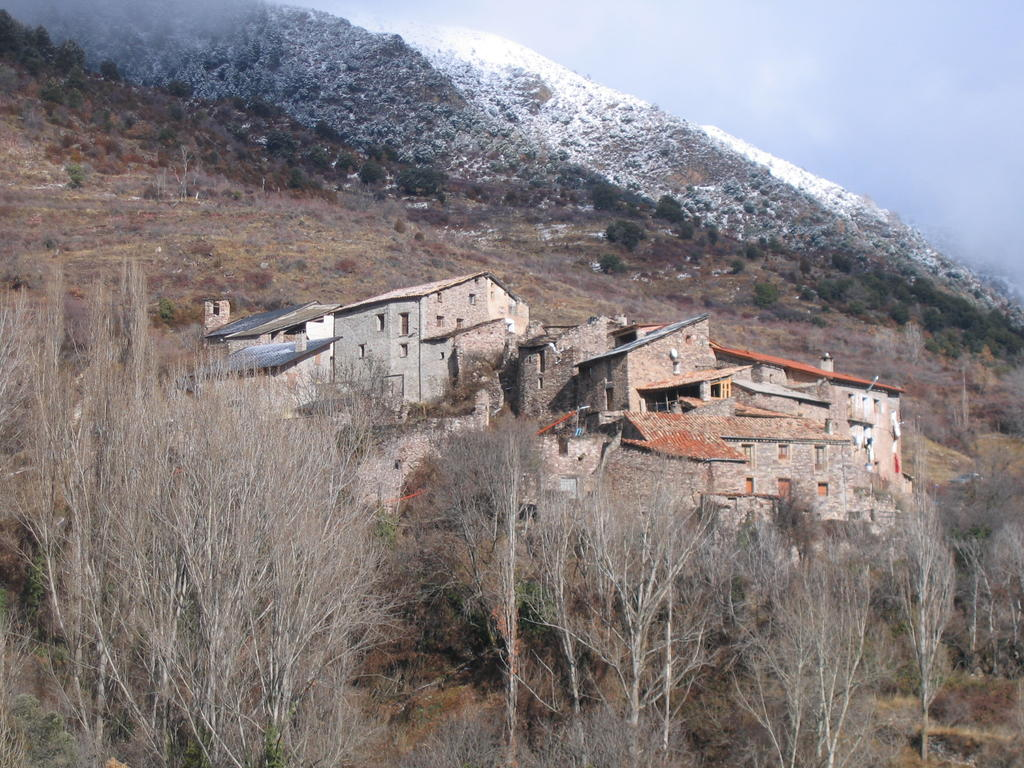
Mencui in winter from south

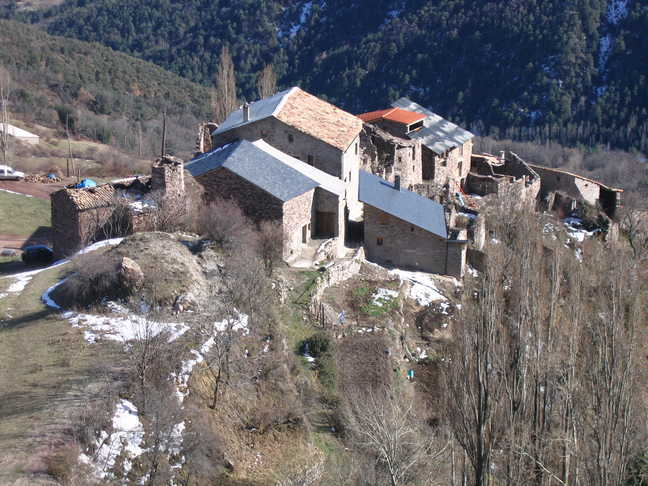
Mencui from north

== Demographic Data ==
Year	1857	1888	1900	1910	1920	1930	1940	1950	1960	1970	1981	1986	1991
Inhabitants	133	98	85	104	101	124	86	82	57	39	22	31	24
