= Port de la Bonaigua =

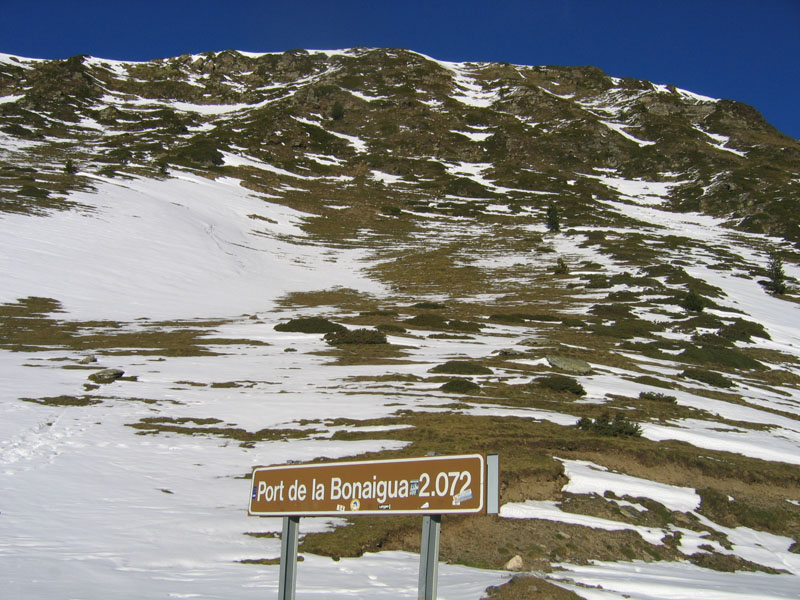

- Location within Catalonia
- Elevation: 2,072 m (6,798 ft)

Third Approach
- Location: Esterri d'Àneu; Vielha e Mijaran
- Range: Pyrenees
- Coordinates: 42°39′50″N 0°58′55″E

Port de la Bonaigua (el. 2072 m., 6,798 ft) is a mountain pass in the Pyrenees in Catalonia, Spain. It connects Esterri d'Àneu in the comarca of Pallars Sobirà with Vielha e Mijaran in the comarca of Aran. The Baqueira-Beret ski resort is located at the top of the pass.

Climate data for Port de la Bonaigua
Month	Jan	Feb	Mar	Apr	May	Jun	Jul	Aug	Sep	Oct	Nov	Dec	Year
Record high °C (°F)	13.2 (55.8)	10.9 (51.6)	13.0 (55.4)	15.7 (60.3)	19.7 (67.5)	23.0 (73.4)	24.3 (75.7)	25.2 (77.4)	19.7 (67.5)	17.5 (63.5)	17.9 (64.2)	13.0 (55.4)	25.2 (77.4)
Mean daily maximum °C (°F)	0.5 (32.9)	−0.6 (30.9)	2.5 (36.5)	5.7 (42.3)	8.2 (46.8)	12.6 (54.7)	15.6 (60.1)	16.0 (60.8)	11.6 (52.9)	7.8 (46.0)	3.0 (37.4)	1.3 (34.3)	7.0 (44.6)
Daily mean °C (°F)	−3.3 (26.1)	−4.8 (23.4)	−2.2 (28.0)	0.8 (33.4)	3.9 (39.0)	8.5 (47.3)	11.6 (52.9)	11.8 (53.2)	7.6 (45.7)	4.3 (39.7)	−0.3 (31.5)	−2.4 (27.7)	3.0 (37.4)
Mean daily minimum °C (°F)	−6.7 (19.9)	−8.2 (17.2)	−5.7 (21.7)	−2.7 (27.1)	0.2 (32.4)	4.8 (40.6)	6.3 (43.3)	7.8 (46.0)	4.3 (39.7)	1.1 (34.0)	−3.2 (26.2)	−4.2 (24.4)	−0.5 (31.1)
Record low °C (°F)	−18.8 (−1.8)	−22.0 (−7.6)	−18.7 (−1.7)	−12.1 (10.2)	−7.6 (18.3)	−4.5 (23.9)	−1.4 (29.5)	−1.3 (29.7)	−7.7 (18.1)	−12.2 (10.0)	−15.9 (3.4)	−26.0 (−14.8)	−26.0 (−14.8)
Average precipitation mm (inches)	74.5 (2.93)	90.5 (3.56)	106.3 (4.19)	127.4 (5.02)	134.9 (5.31)	109.0 (4.29)	87.5 (3.44)	75.3 (2.96)	74.6 (2.94)	103.9 (4.09)	147.3 (5.80)	63.9 (2.52)	1,204.8 (47.43)
Average snowfall cm (inches)	154.7 (60.9)	229.9 (90.5)	261.5 (103.0)	249.7 (98.3)	186.1 (73.3)	68.4 (26.9)	6.2 (2.4)	0 (0)	2.5 (1.0)	16.0 (6.3)	50.9 (20.0)	77.9 (30.7)	1,303.7 (513.3)
Average precipitation days	14.4	14.8	15.5	17.5	18.2	15.1	9.9	11.0	14.1	12.5	16.0	14.3	169.9
Average snowy days	28.9	27.5	29.1	22.9	15.6	4.0	0.6	0.5	4.2	10.3	21.3	27.9	193.1
Average relative humidity (%)	68.6	75.6	73.2	79.1	78.4	74.1	61.9	68.0	74.6	73.5	74.4	66.6	71.2
Mean monthly sunshine hours	69	105	157	172	207	230	212	213	162	113	73	57	1,770
Source: Servei Meteorològic de Catalunya

== See also ==
- List of highest paved roads in Europe
