= Bosc de Virós =

Ski resort in Bordes de Virós, Catalonia

- Interactive map of Bosc de Virós
- Nearest city: Alins, Catalonia
- Coordinates: 42°31′29″N 1°17′2″E
- Top elevation: 2,200
- Base elevation: 1,550
- Trails: Cross-country skiing: 28 Km.
- Longest run: 12 km (7.5 mi)

Bosc de Virós (or Virós-Vallferrera) is a ski resort for Nordic skiing in the town of Bordes de Virós, in the municipality of Alins, in Catalonia, opened in 2001. It's located in the Alt Pirineu Natural Park.

The Gall Fer refuge is the base for all activities, including hosting service for 25 people and a restaurant.

- Total of cross-country skiing trails: 28 km
- Longest cross-country skiing trail: 12 km
- Sled-dog circuit: 12 km
