= Tírvia =

- Municipality
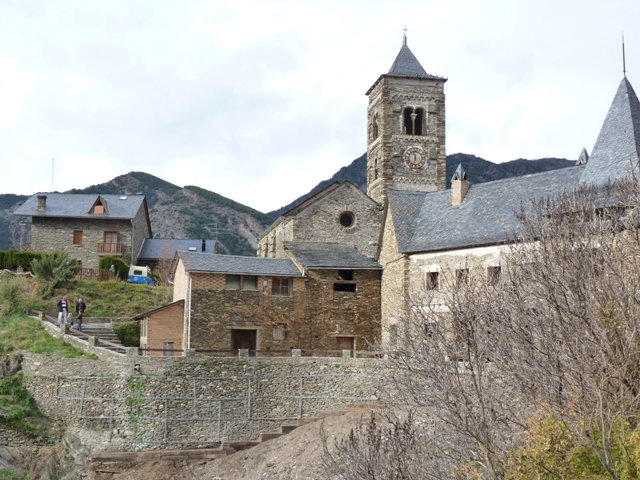

- Coat of arms

- Location in Catalonia
- Coordinates: 42.515°N 1.244°E
- Country: Spain
- Community: Catalonia
- Province: Lleida
- Comarca: Pallars Sobirà

Government
  - Mayor: Joan Farrera Granja (2015)

Area
  - Total: 8.5 km^{2} (3.3 sq mi)

Population (2025-01-01)
  - Total: 141
  - Density: 17/km^{2} (43/sq mi)
- Website: tirvia.cat

Tírvia (Catalan pronunciation: [ˈtiɾβia]) is a village in the province of Lleida and autonomous community of Catalonia, Spain. Earliest documentation of settlement in the area dates back to the tenth century. It has a population of 141 (register office, 2025).

The town suffered a large fire in 1553, which killed 160 people, more than the contemporary population of the municipality.
