= Isavarre =

- Locality
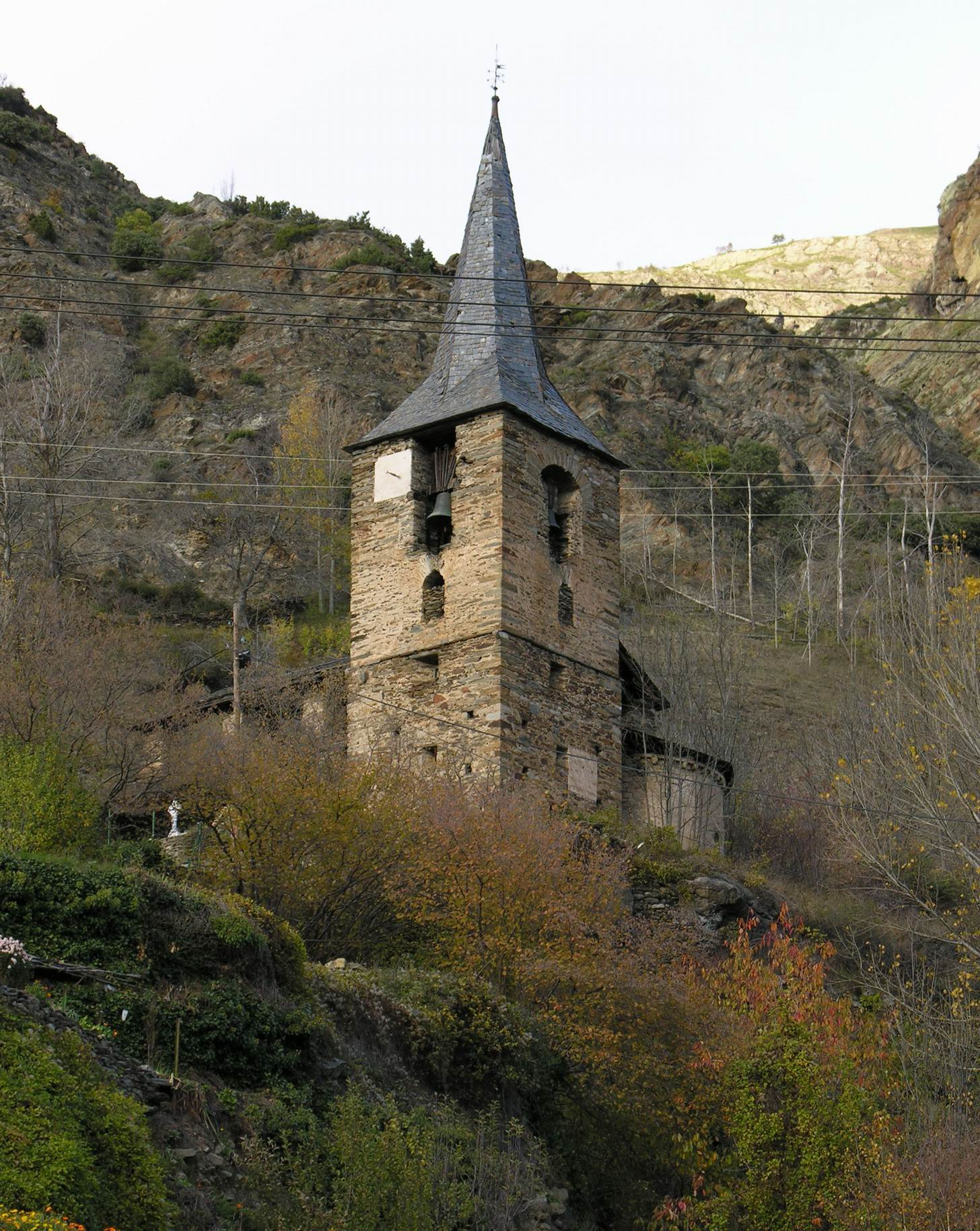

- Location within Province of Lleida Location within Catalonia Location within Spain
- Coordinates: 42°39′1″N 1°5′58″E
- Country: Spain
- Community: Catalonia
- Province: Lleida
- Municipality: Alt Àneu
- Elevation: 1,092 m (3,583 ft)

Population
  - Total: 25

Isavarre (Catalan pronunciation: [dʒaˈβare]; locally [dʒaˈβari]) is a hamlet within the municipality of Alt Àneu, in Lleida province, Catalonia, Spain. As of 2020, it has a population of 25.

== Geography ==
Isavarre is located 169km north-northeast of Lleida.
