= Besan, Pallars =

Besan
- Locality
- Location within Province of Lleida Location within Catalonia Location within Spain
- Coordinates: 42°32′36″N 1°16′27″E
- Country: Spain
- Community: Catalonia
- Province: Lleida
- Municipality: Alins
- Elevation: 1,137 m (3,730 ft)

Population
  - Total: 5

Besan is a locality located in the municipality of Alins, in Province of Lleida province, Catalonia, Spain. As of 2020, it has a population of 5.
