= Sorpe (Alto Aneu) =

- Decentralized municipal entity
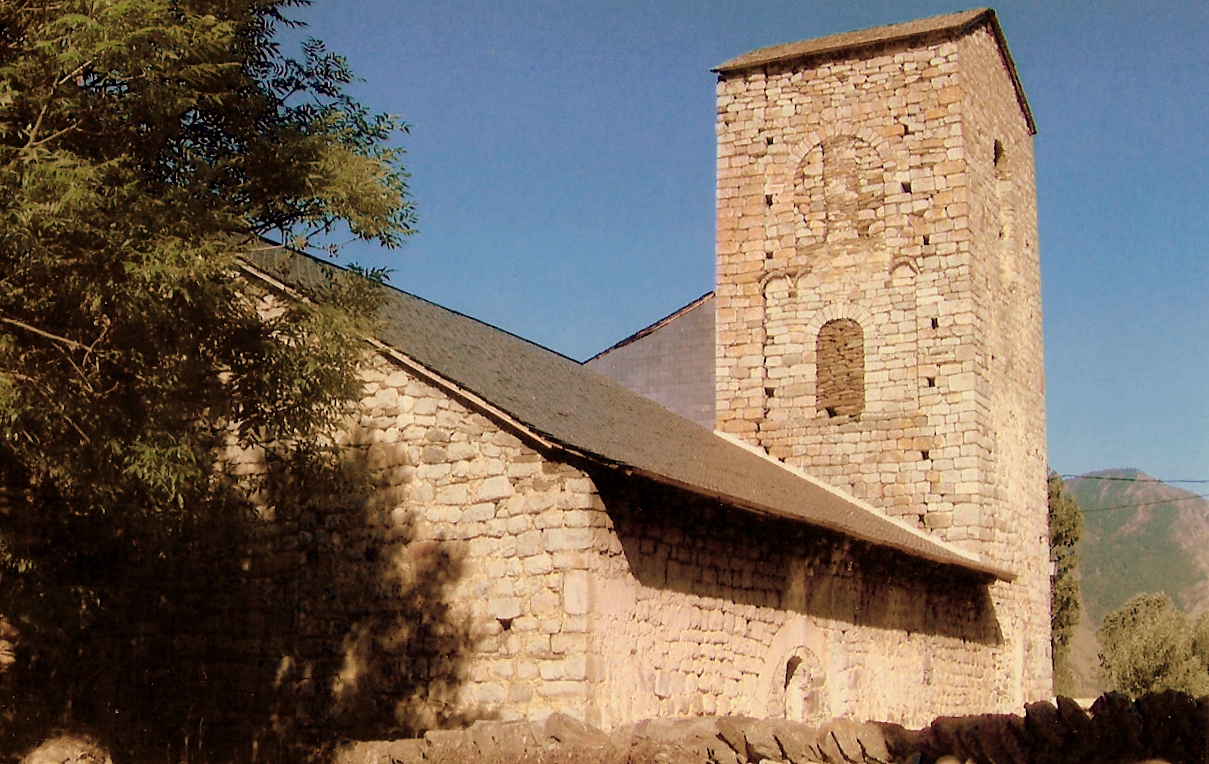

- Location within Province of Lleida Location within Catalonia Location within Spain
- Coordinates: 42°39′7″N 1°4′47″E
- Country: Spain
- Community: Catalonia
- Province: Lleida
- Municipality: Alt Àneu
- Elevation: 1,269 m (4,163 ft)

Population
  - Total: 42

Sorpe (Catalan pronunciation: [ˈsoɾpe]) is a locality and decentralized municipal entity located in the municipality of Alt Àneu, in Province of Lleida province, Catalonia, Spain. As of 2020, it has a population of 42.

== Geography ==
Sorpe is located 168km north-northeast of Lleida.
