= Ainet de Besan =

- Decentralized municipal entity
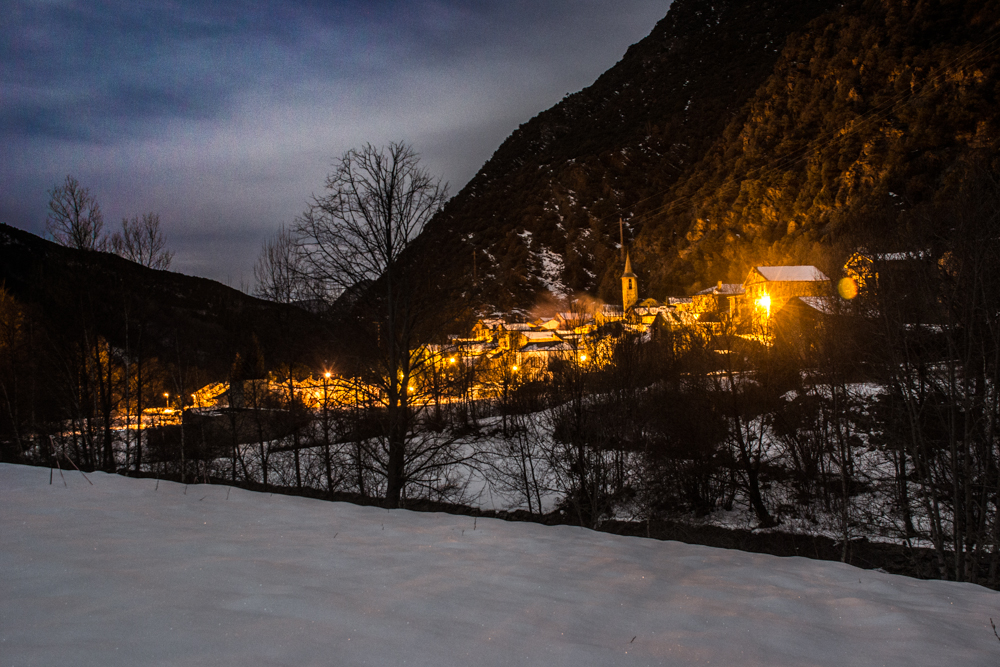

- Location within Province of Lleida Location within Catalonia Location within Spain
- Coordinates: 42°32′17″N 1°17′47″E
- Country: Spain
- Community: Catalonia
- Province: Lleida
- Municipality: Alins
- Elevation: 1,004 m (3,294 ft)

Population
  - Total: 45

Ainet de Besan is a locality and decentralized municipal entity located in the municipality of Alins, in Province of Lleida province, Catalonia, Spain. As of 2020, it has a population of 45.

== Geography ==
Ainet de Besan is located 156km north-northeast of Lleida.
