= Vall de Cardós =

- Municipality
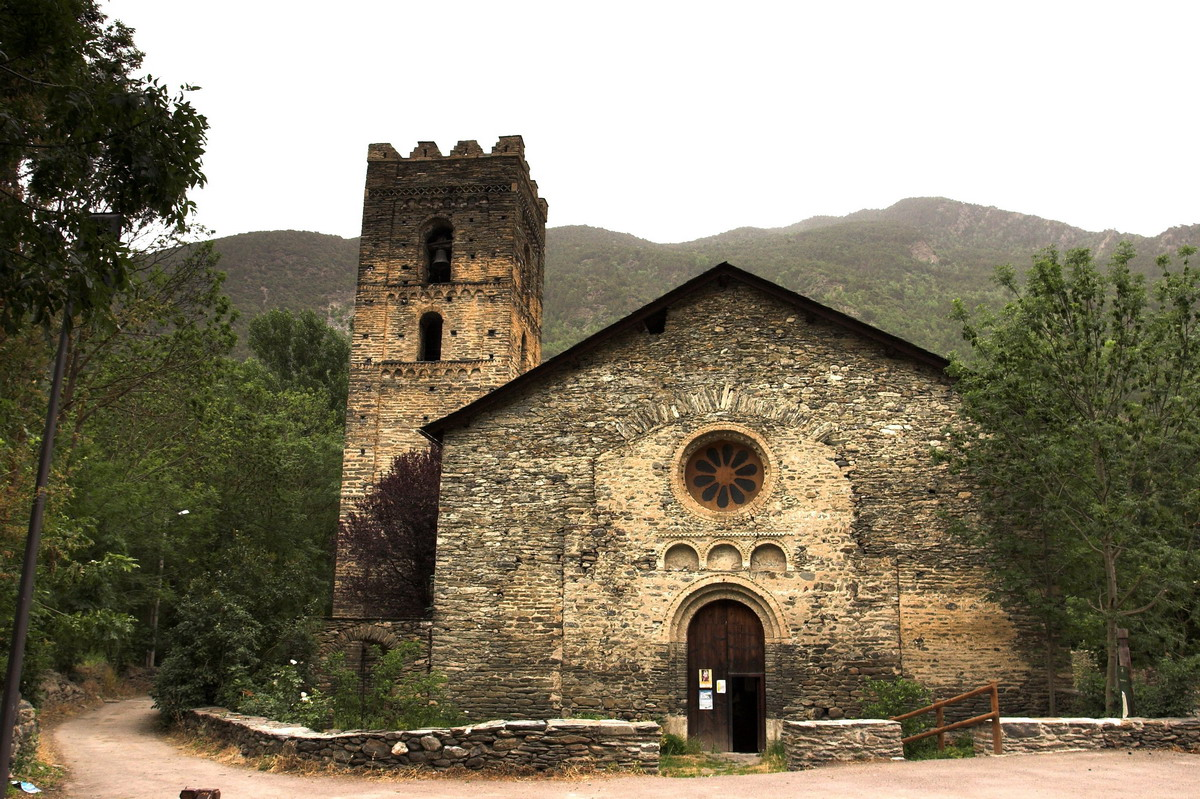
- St. Mary's church, Ribera de Cardós

- Flag Coat of arms

- Location in Catalonia
- Coordinates: 42°33′56″N 1°13′36″E
- Country: Spain
- Community: Catalonia
- Province: Lleida
- Comarca: Pallars Sobirà

Government
  - Mayor: Llorenç Sánchez Abrié (2015)

Area
  - Total: 56.2 km^{2} (21.7 sq mi)

Population (2025-01-01)
  - Total: 388
  - Density: 6.90/km^{2} (17.9/sq mi)
- Website: vallcardos.cat

Vall de Cardós (Catalan pronunciation: [ˈbaʎ ðe kaɾˈðos]) is a village in the province of Lleida and autonomous community of Catalonia, Spain. It is part of the province Pallars Sobirà and has a population of 388 (register office, 2025).

Historical population
| Year | Pop. | ±% |
|---|---|---|
| 1981 | 369 | — |
| 1991 | 333 | −9.8% |
| 2001 | 348 | +4.5% |
| 2011 | 406 | +16.7% |
| 2021 | 378 | −6.9% |
