= Araós =

- Decentralized municipal entity
- Location within Province of Lleida Location within Catalonia Location within Spain
- Coordinates: 42°32′6″N 1°15′40″E
- Country: Spain
- Community: Catalonia
- Province: Lleida
- Municipality: Alins
- Elevation: 923 m (3,028 ft)

Population
  - Total: 51

Araós is a locality and decentralized municipal entity located in the municipality of Alins, in Province of Lleida province, Catalonia, Spain. As of 2020, it has a population of 51.

== Geography ==
Araós is located 153km north-northeast of Lleida.
