= Soriguera =

- Municipality
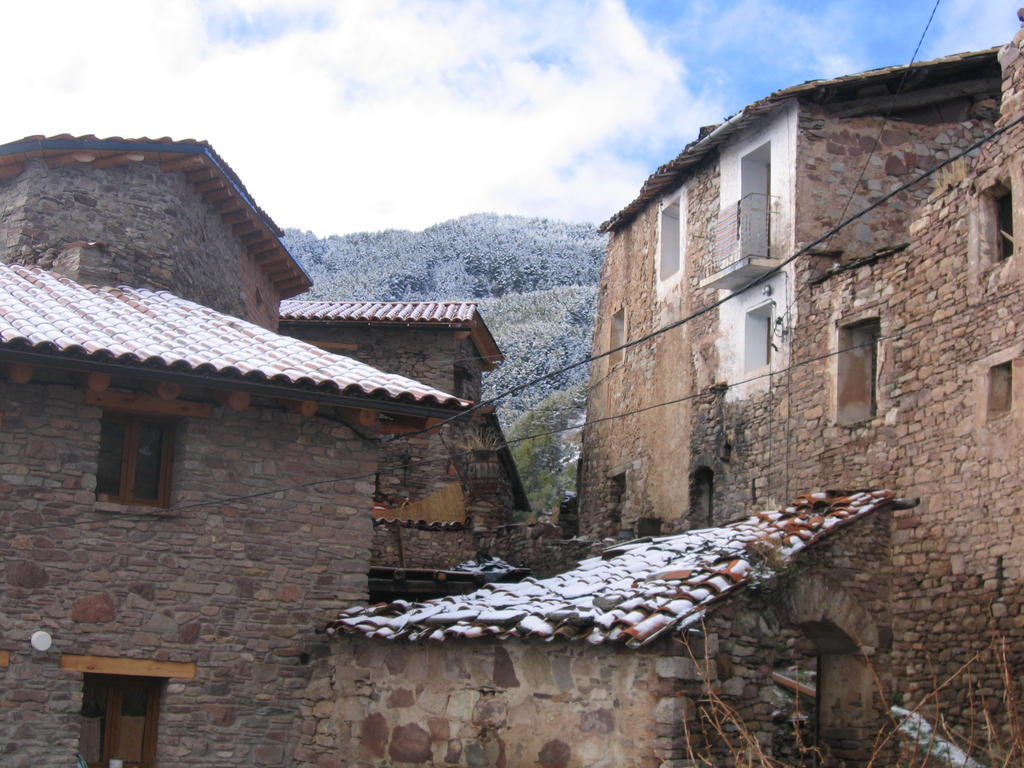
- Mencui village

- Flag Coat of arms

- Location in Catalonia
- Coordinates: 42°22′20″N 1°10′55″E
- Country: Spain
- Community: Catalonia
- Province: Lleida
- Comarca: Pallars Sobirà

Government
  - Mayor: Xavier Pedemonte Garcia (2015)

Area
  - Total: 106.4 km^{2} (41.1 sq mi)

Population (2025-01-01)
  - Total: 446
  - Density: 4.19/km^{2} (10.9/sq mi)
- Website: soriguera.ddl.net

Soriguera (Catalan pronunciation: [soɾiˈɣeɾa]) is a village in the province of Lleida and autonomous community of Catalonia, Spain. It has a population of 446 (register office, 2025).
