= Farrera =

- Municipality
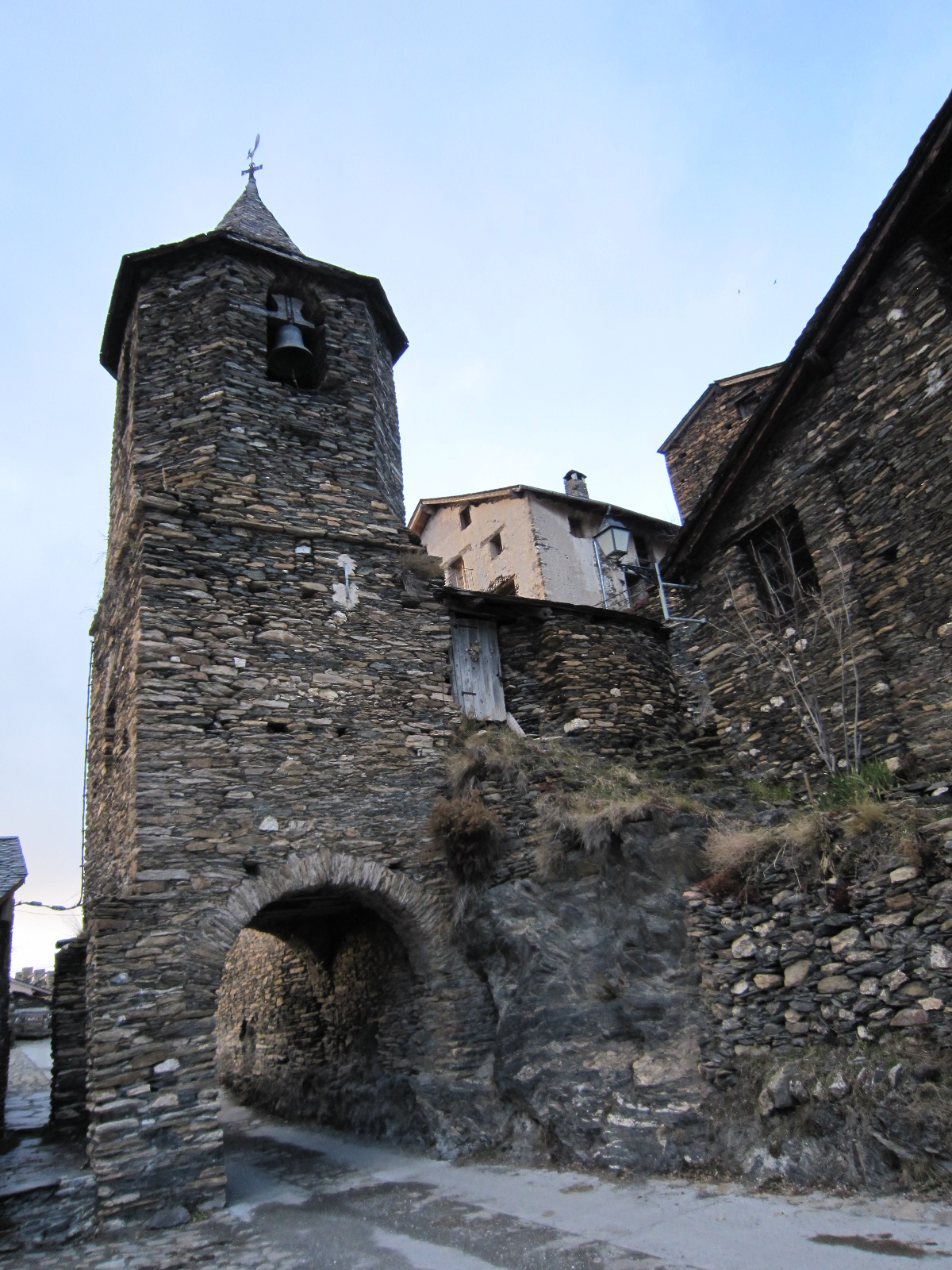

- Coat of arms

- Location in Catalonia
- Coordinates: 42°30′N 1°16′E
- Country: Spain
- Community: Catalonia
- Province: Lleida
- Comarca: Pallars Sobirà

Government
  - Mayor: Santiago Isús Carrera (2015)

Area
  - Total: 61.9 km^{2} (23.9 sq mi)

Population (2025-01-01)
  - Total: 118
  - Density: 1.91/km^{2} (4.94/sq mi)
- Website: farrera.org

Farrera (Catalan pronunciation: [faˈreɾa]; locally [faˈrɛɾa]) is a village in the province of Lleida and autonomous community of Catalonia, Spain. It has a population of 118 (register office, 2025).
