= Son (Alto Aneu) =

- Locality
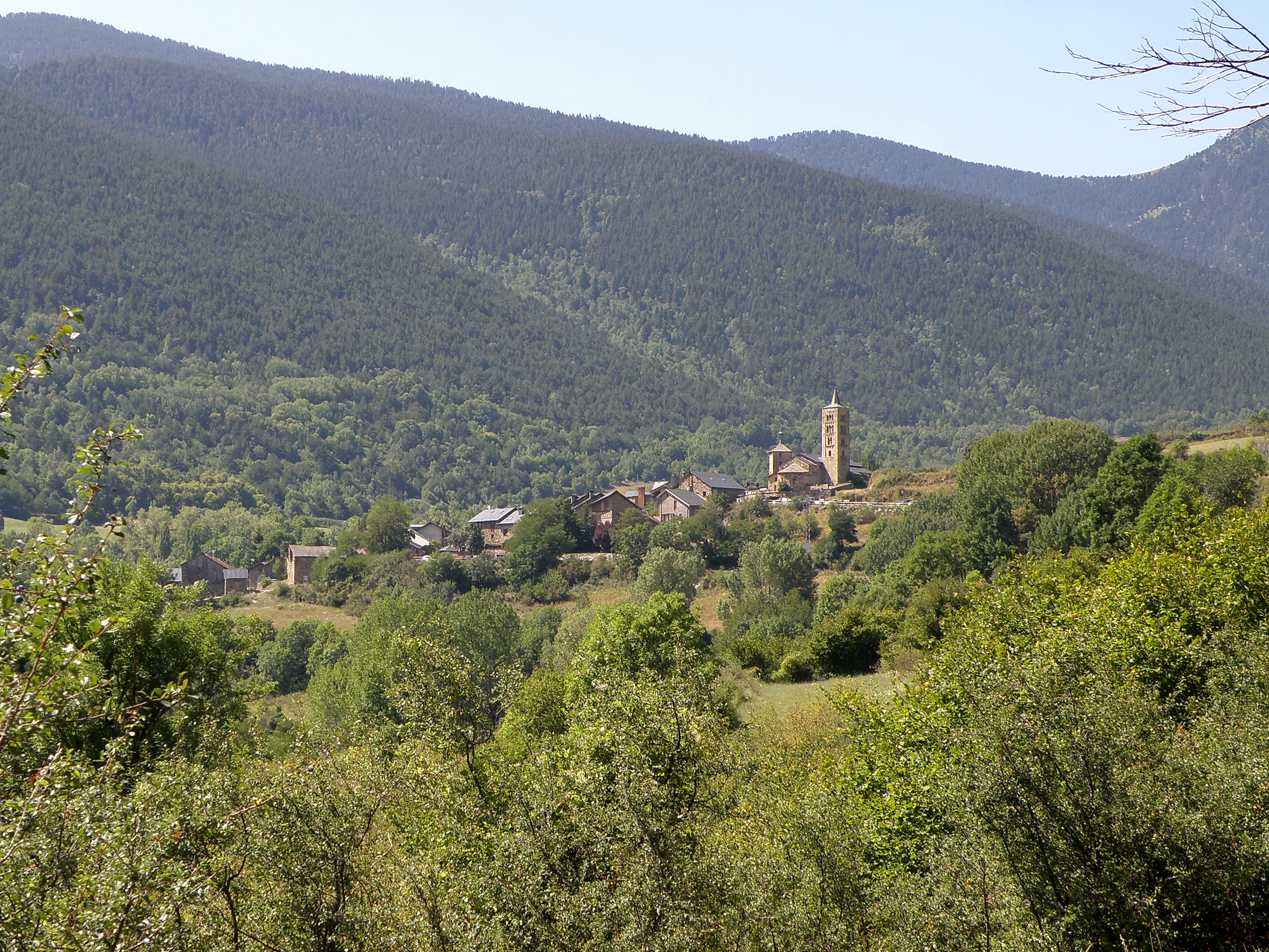

- Location within Province of Lleida Location within Catalonia Location within Spain
- Coordinates: 42°37′11″N 1°5′48″E
- Country: Spain
- Community: Catalonia
- Province: Lleida
- Municipality: Alt Àneu
- Elevation: 1,377 m (4,518 ft)

Population
  - Total: 44

Son (Catalan pronunciation: [ˈson]) is a hamlet located in the municipality of Alt Àneu, in Province of Lleida province, Catalonia, Spain. As of 2020, it has a population of 44.

== Geography ==
Son is located 169km north-northeast of Lleida.
