= Àrreu =

- Locality
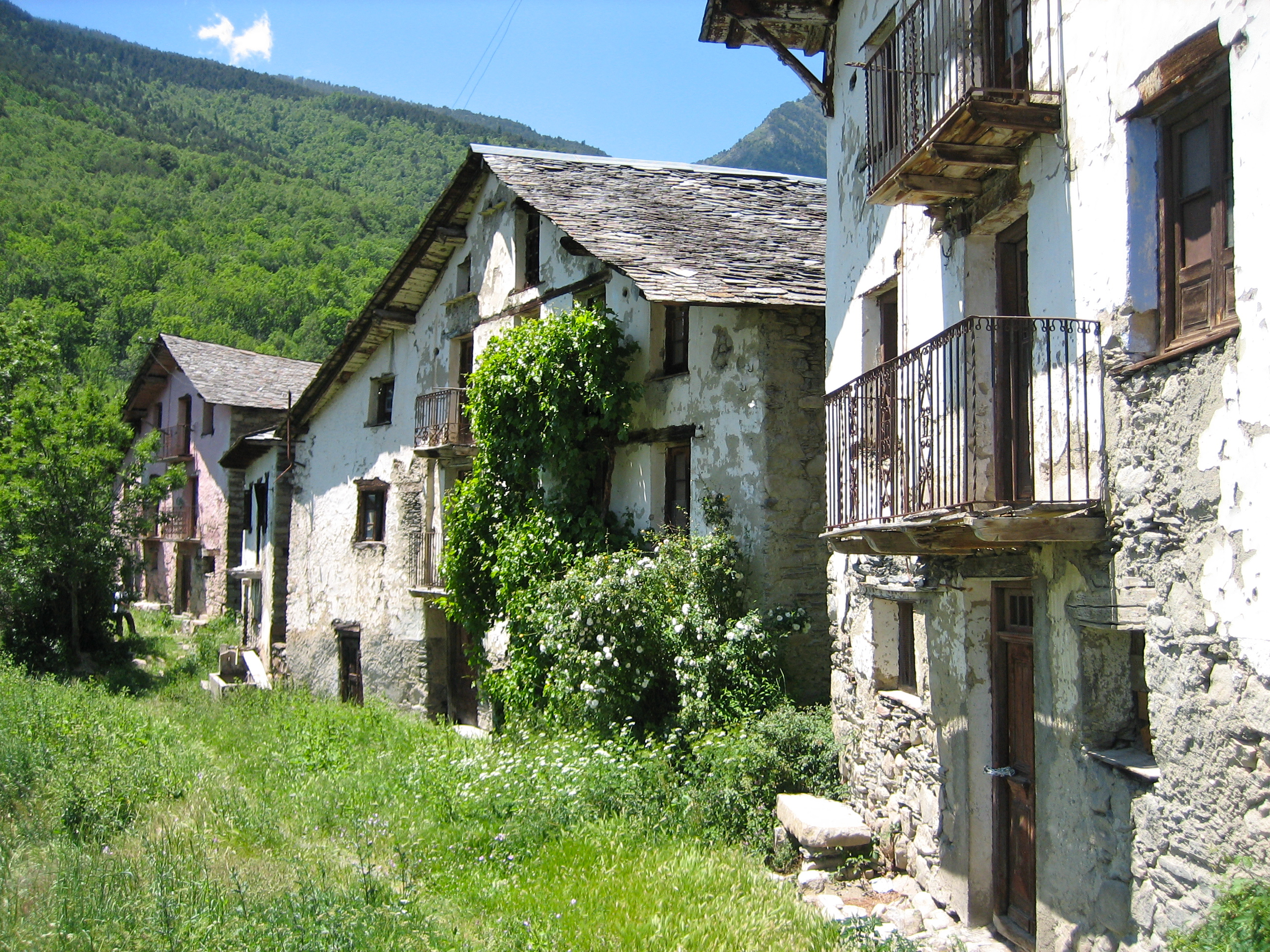

- Location within Province of Lleida Location within Catalonia Location within Spain
- Coordinates: 42°39′50″N 1°4′27″E
- Country: Spain
- Community: Catalonia
- Province: Lleida
- Municipality: Alt Àneu
- Elevation: 1,262 m (4,140 ft)

Population
  - Total: 4

Àrreu (Catalan pronunciation: [ˈarew]) is a locality located in the municipality of Alt Àneu, in Province of Lleida province, Catalonia, Spain. As of 2020, it has a population of 4.
