= Norís =

- Locality
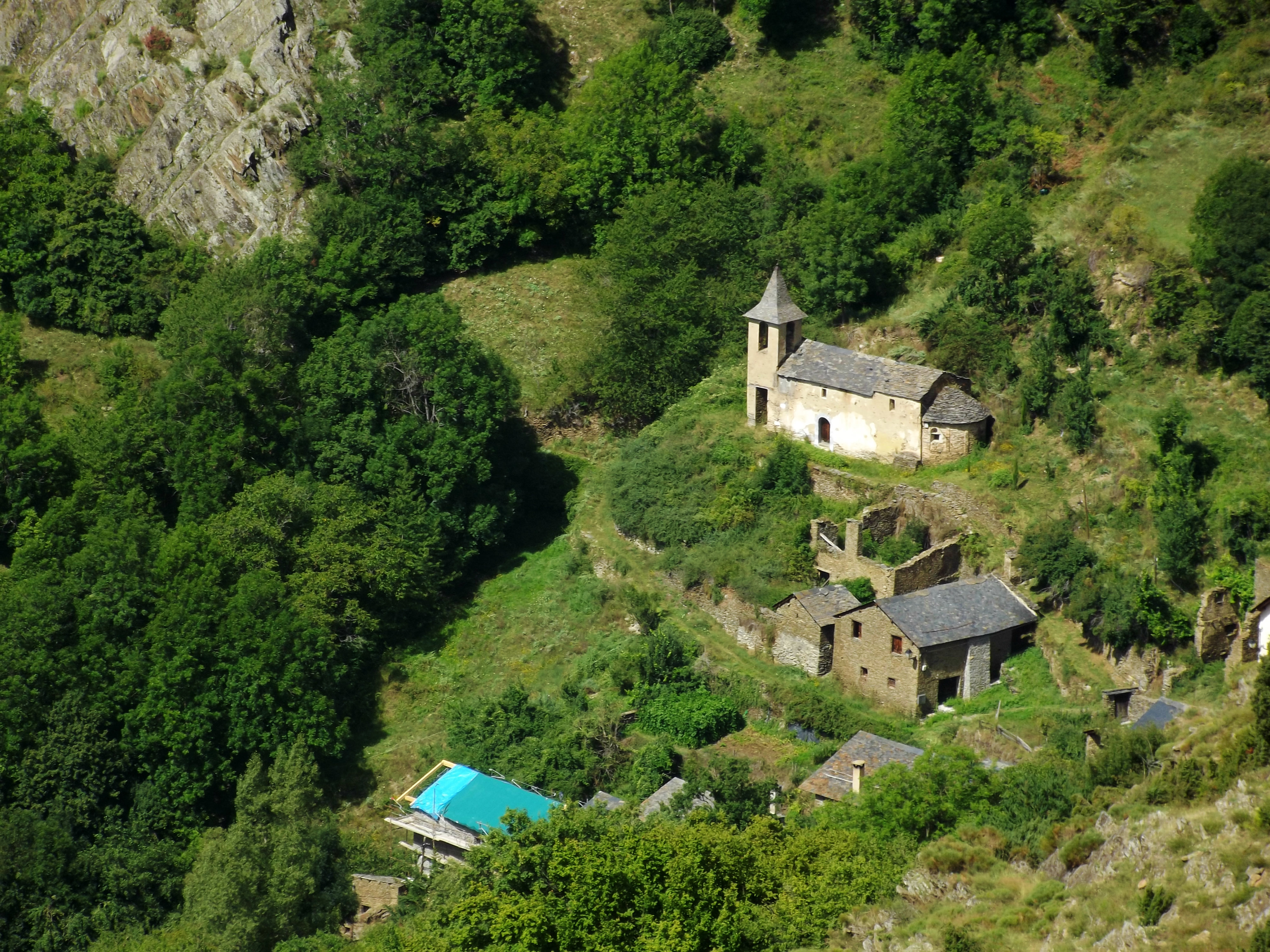

- Location within Province of Lleida Location within Catalonia Location within Spain
- Coordinates: 42°33′53″N 1°20′37″E
- Country: Spain
- Community: Catalonia
- Province: Lleida
- Municipality: Alins
- Elevation: 1,238 m (4,062 ft)

Population
  - Total: 9

Norís is a locality located in the municipality of Alins, in Province of Lleida province, Catalonia, Spain. As of 2020, it has a population of 9.

== Geography ==
Norís is located 164km north-northeast of Lleida.
