= Esterri d'Àneu =

- Municipality
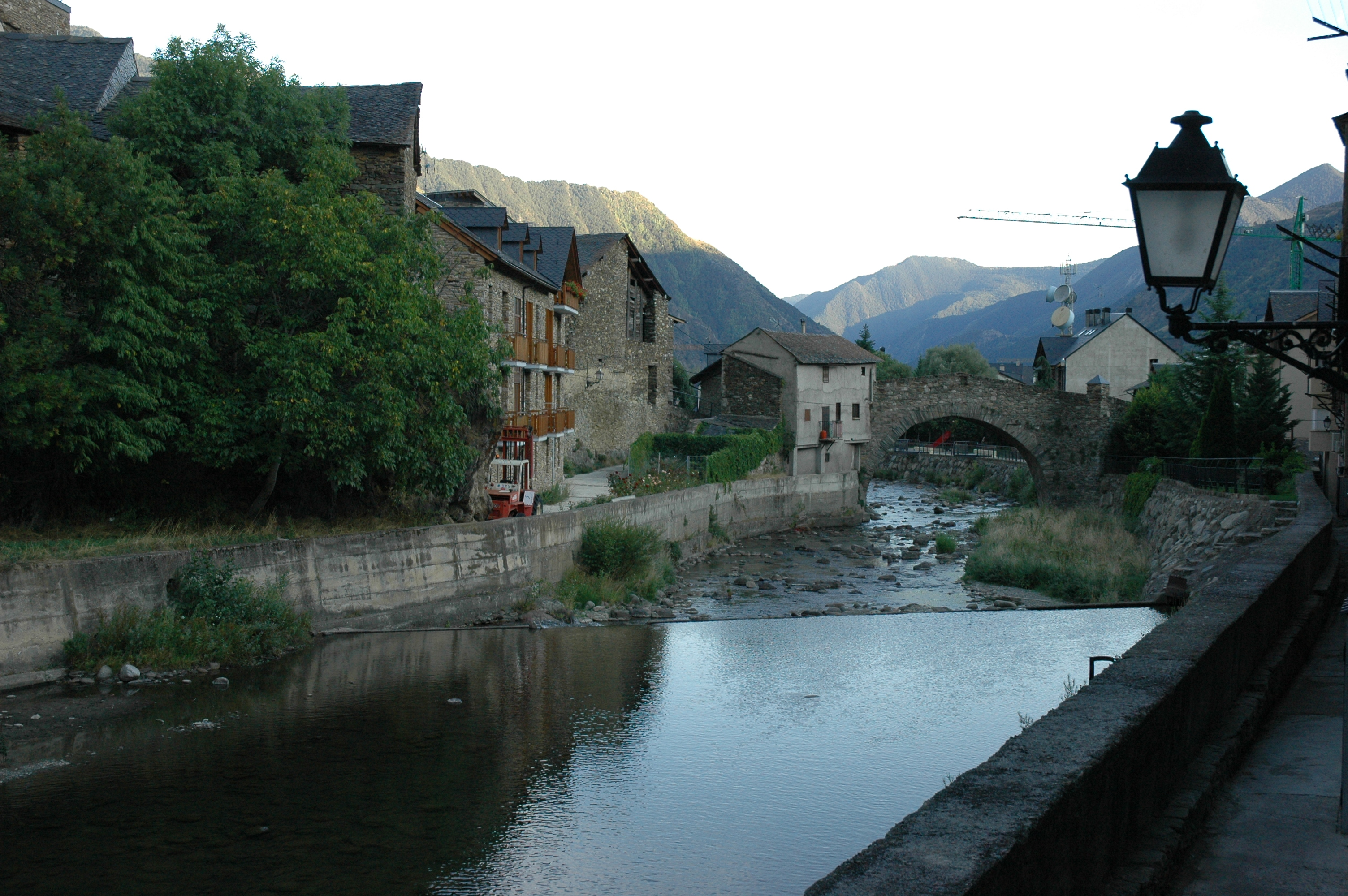

- Flag Coat of arms

- Location in Pallars Sobirà county

- Location within Catalonia Location within Spain
- Coordinates: 42°37′48″N 1°07′28″E
- Sovereign state: Spain
- Community: Catalonia
- Region: Alt Pirineu
- County: Pallars Sobirà
- Province: Lleida

Government
  - Mayor: Pere Ticó Domingo (ERC) (2019)

Area
  - Total: 8.5 km^{2} (3.3 sq mi)
- Elevation: 957 m (3,140 ft)

Population (2025-01-01)
  - Total: 917
  - Density: 110/km^{2} (280/sq mi)
- Demonym(s): Esterrienc, -ca
- Postal code: 25580
- Website: www.esterrianeu.cat

Esterri d'Àneu (Catalan pronunciation: [esˈtɛri ˈðanew]) is a town and municipality in Pallars Sobirà county, Province of Lleida, Catalonia, Spain. It has a population of 917 (register office, 2025).

It is situated on the right bank of the Noguera Pallaresa river above the reservoir of La Torrassa. It is linked to Sort by the C-147 road. It is the site of a hydroelectric power station.
