= Isil (Alto Aneu) =

- Decentralized municipal entity
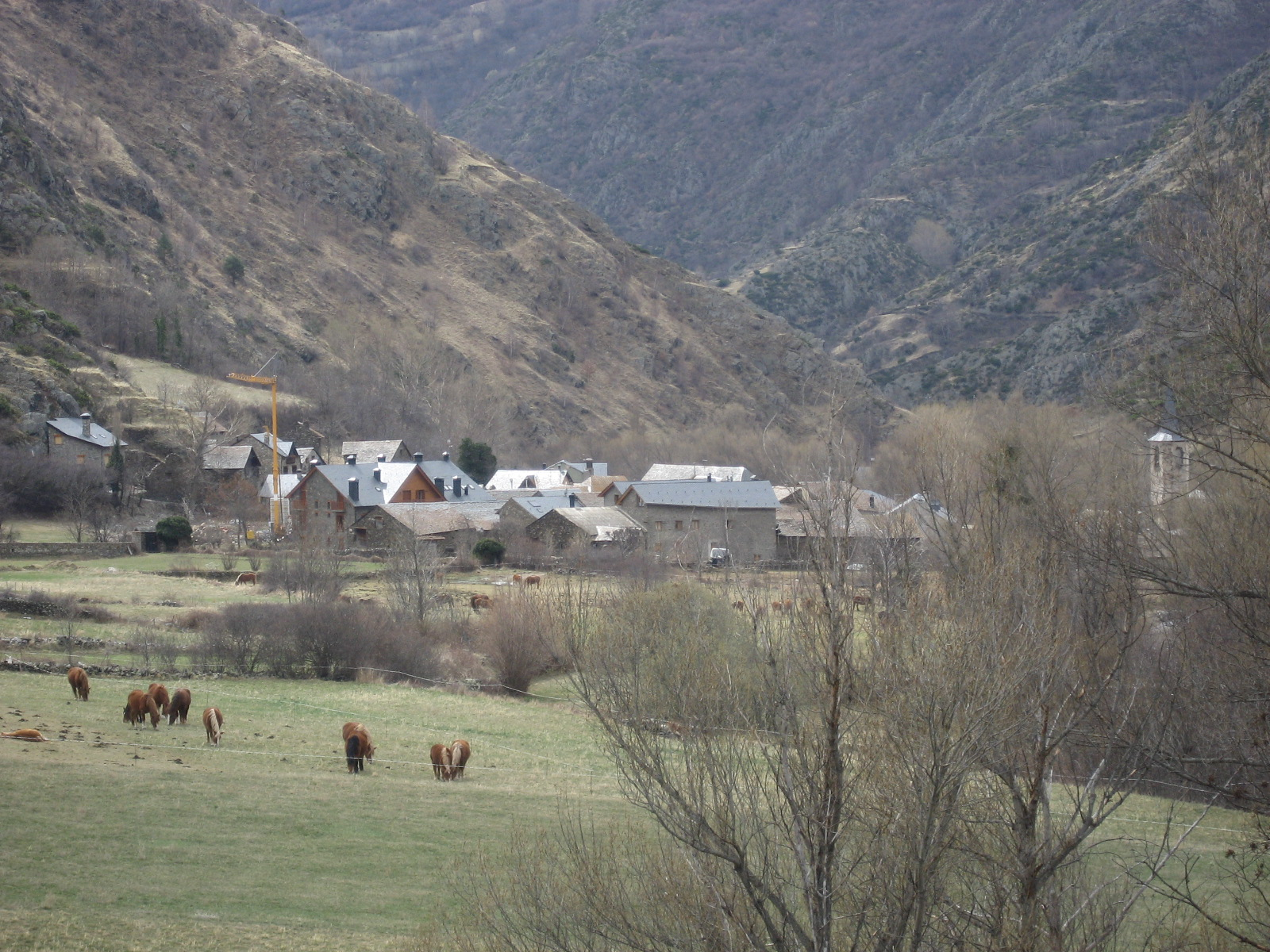

- Location within Province of Lleida Location within Catalonia Location within Spain
- Coordinates: 42°40′44″N 1°5′11″E
- Country: Spain
- Community: Catalonia
- Province: Lleida
- Municipality: Alt Àneu
- Elevation: 1,165 m (3,822 ft)

Population
  - Total: 74

Isil (Catalan pronunciation: [ˈdʒil]) is a locality and decentralized municipal entity located in the municipality of Alt Àneu, in Province of Lleida province, Catalonia, Spain. As of 2020, it has a population of 74.

== Geography ==
Isil is located 173km north-northeast of Lleida.
