= Port de Cabús =

Mountain pass on the Andorra–Spain border

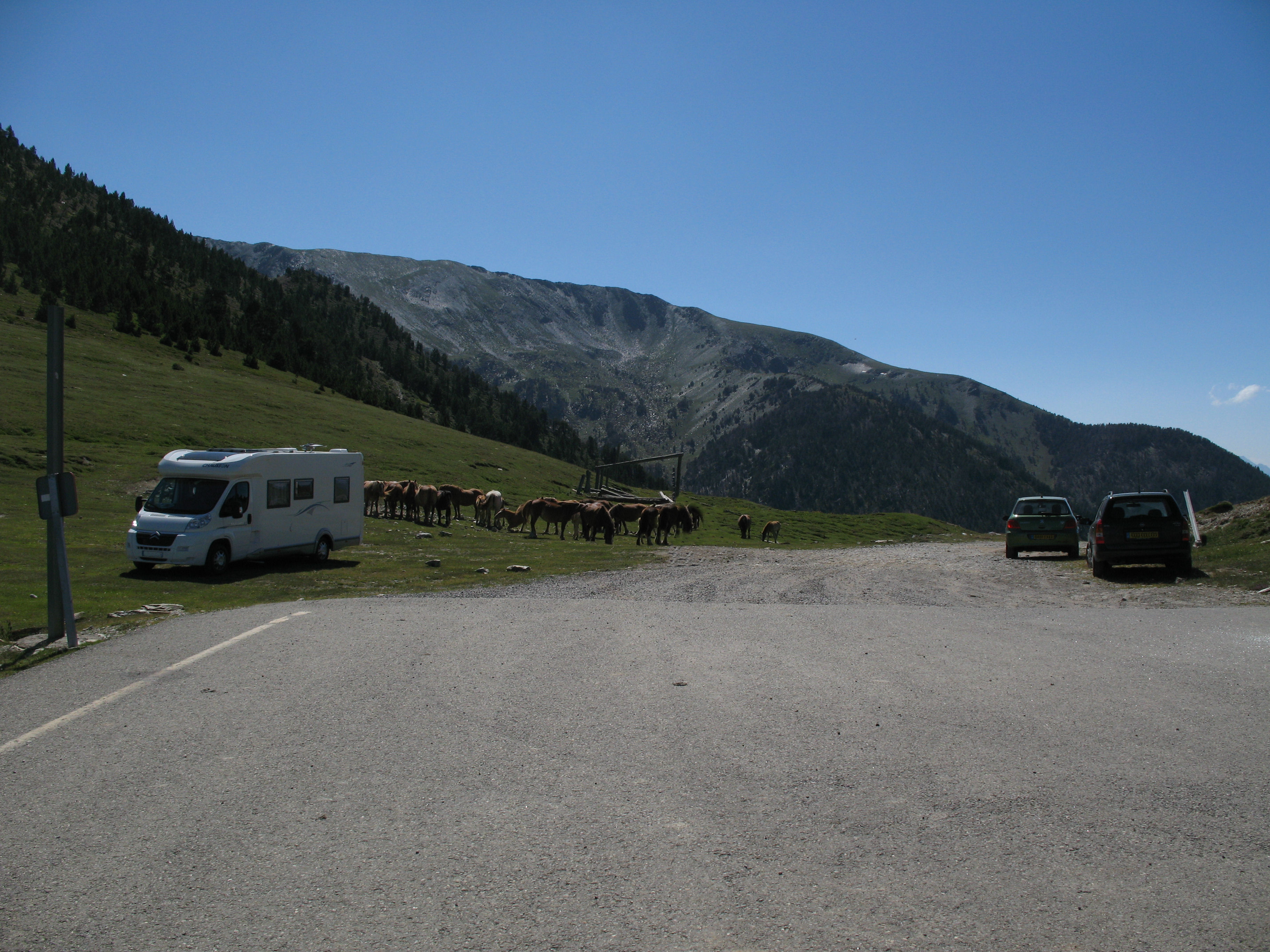
- End of the CG-4 road at Port de Cabús, 2010

- Location within Andorra
- Elevation: 2,328 m (7,638 ft)

Third Approach
- Location: La Massana, Andorra; Alins, Spain
- Range: Pyrenees
- Coordinates: 42°32′47″N 1°25′11″E

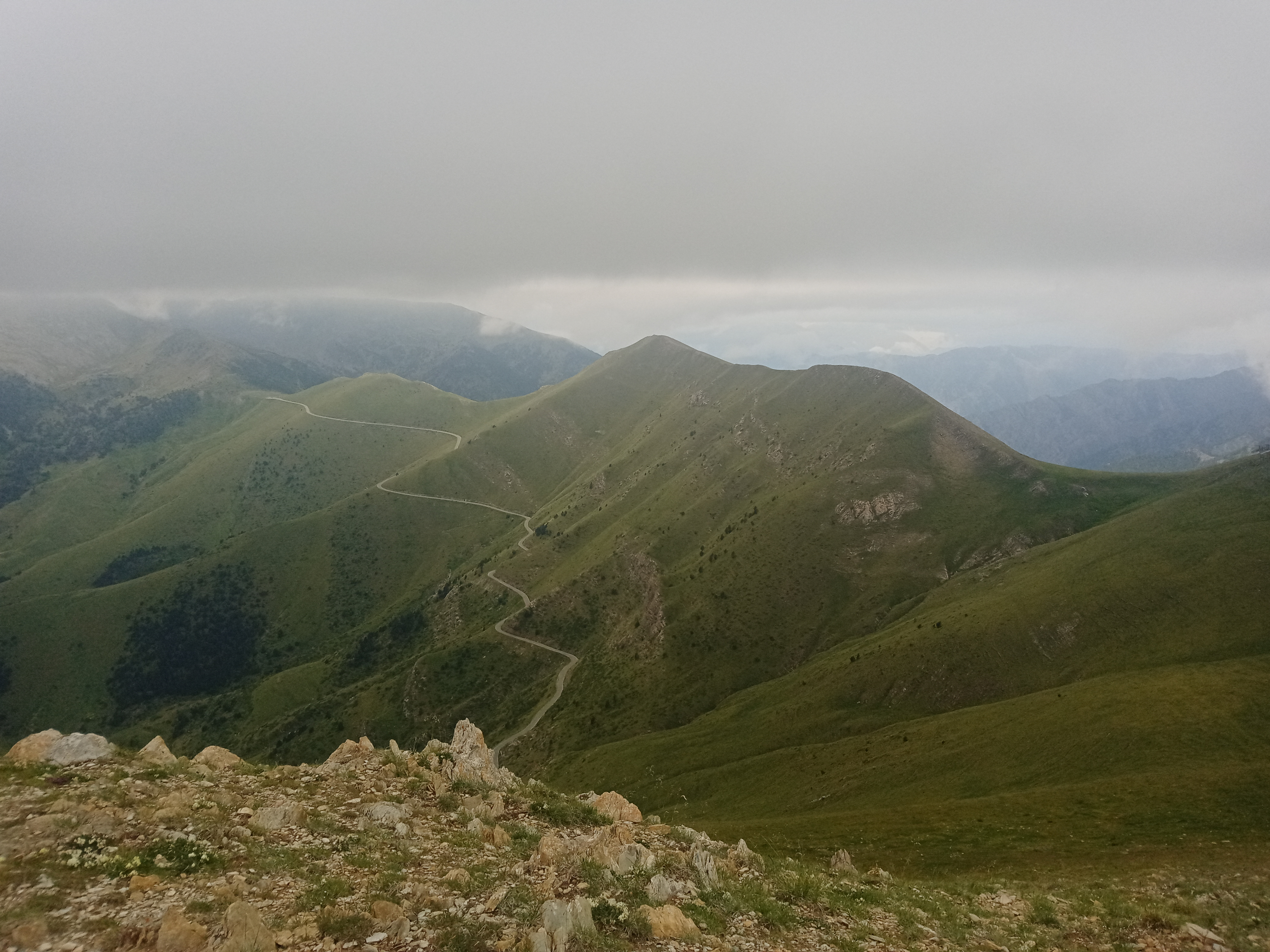
View of Port de Cabús from atop the mountain Alt de la Capa

Port de Cabús (also known as Coll de Cabús in Catalan) is a mountain pass in the Pyrenees on the Andorra–Spain border, located 2,328 metres (7,638 ft) above sea level. It connects the Andorran parish of La Massana with the Spanish town of Alins in Catalonia. The road through it is paved on the Andorran side (CG-4) but not the Spanish side. The pass is typically open from May to October but may be closed due to poor weather, particularly in the winter.

== See also ==
- List of highest paved roads in Europe
