= La Bonaigua =

- Locality
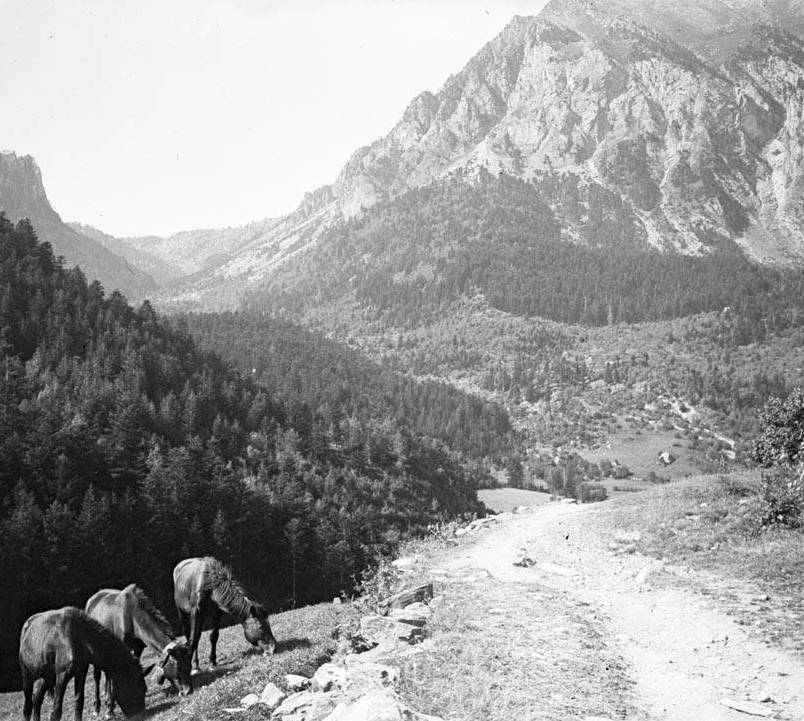

- Location within Province of Lleida Location within Catalonia Location within Spain
- Coordinates: 42°38′15″N 1°2′42″E
- Country: Spain
- Community: Catalonia
- Province: Lleida
- Municipality: Alt Àneu
- Elevation: 1,441 m (4,728 ft)

Population
  - Total: 9

La Bonaigua is a locality located in the municipality of Alt Àneu, in Province of Lleida province, Catalonia, Spain. As of 2020, it has a population of 9.

== Geography ==
La Bonaigua is located 195km north-northeast of Lleida.
