= Esterri de Cardós =

- Municipality
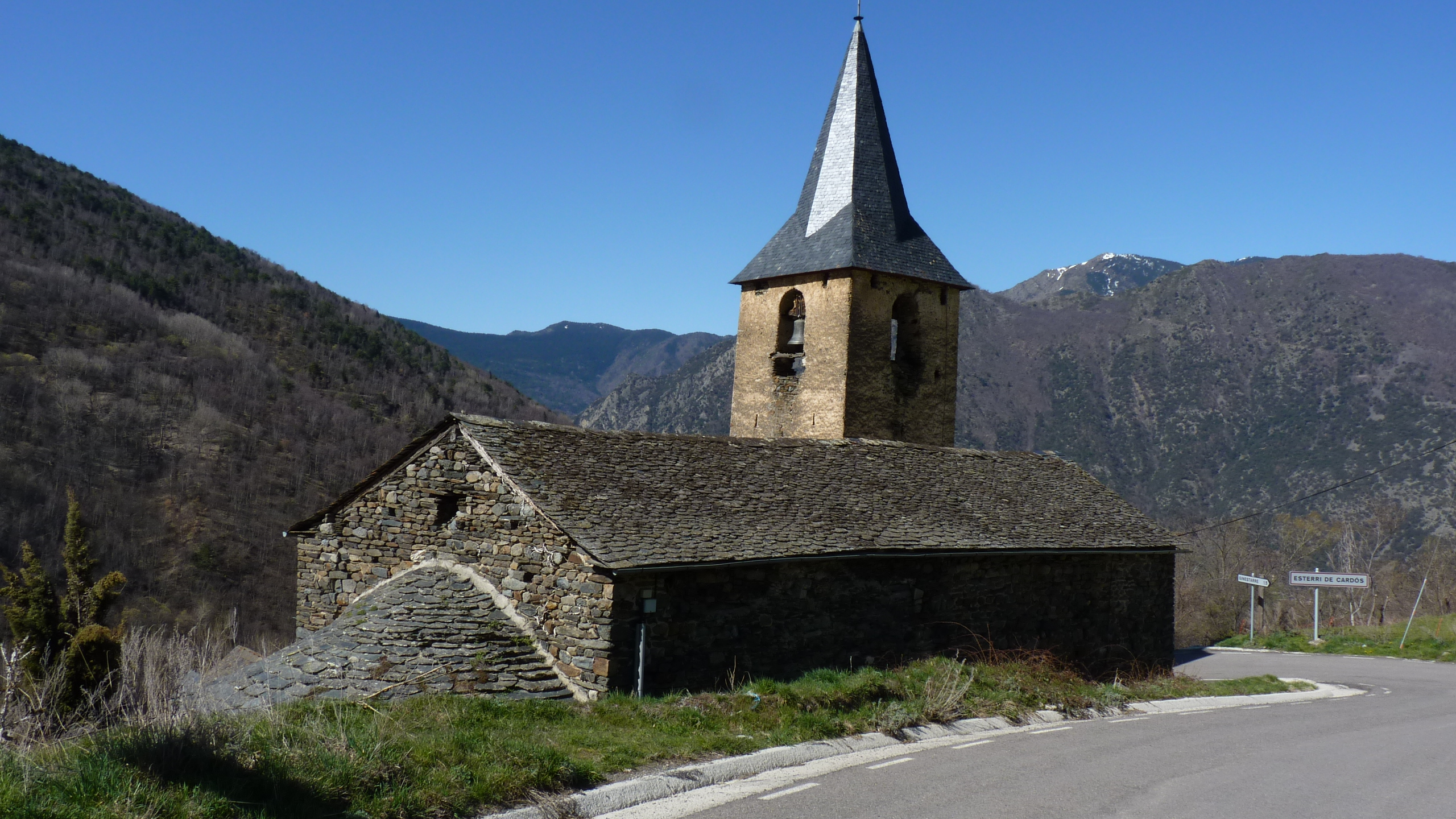

- Coat of arms

- Location in Pallars Sobirà county

- Location within Catalonia Location within Spain
- Coordinates: 42°36′N 1°16′E
- Sovereign state: Spain
- Community: Catalonia
- Region: Alt Pirineu
- County: Pallars Sobirà
- Province: Lleida

Government
  - Mayor: Joel Orteu Aubach (2015)

Area
  - Total: 16.6 km^{2} (6.4 sq mi)

Population (2025-01-01)
  - Total: 63
  - Density: 3.8/km^{2} (9.8/sq mi)
- Website: esterricardos.ddl.net

Esterri de Cardós (Catalan pronunciation: [esˈtɛri ðe kaɾˈðos]) is a town and municipality in Pallars Sobirà county and the Alt Pirineu, Province of Lleida, Catalonia, Spain. It has a population of 63 (register office, 2025).
