= Borén =

- Locality
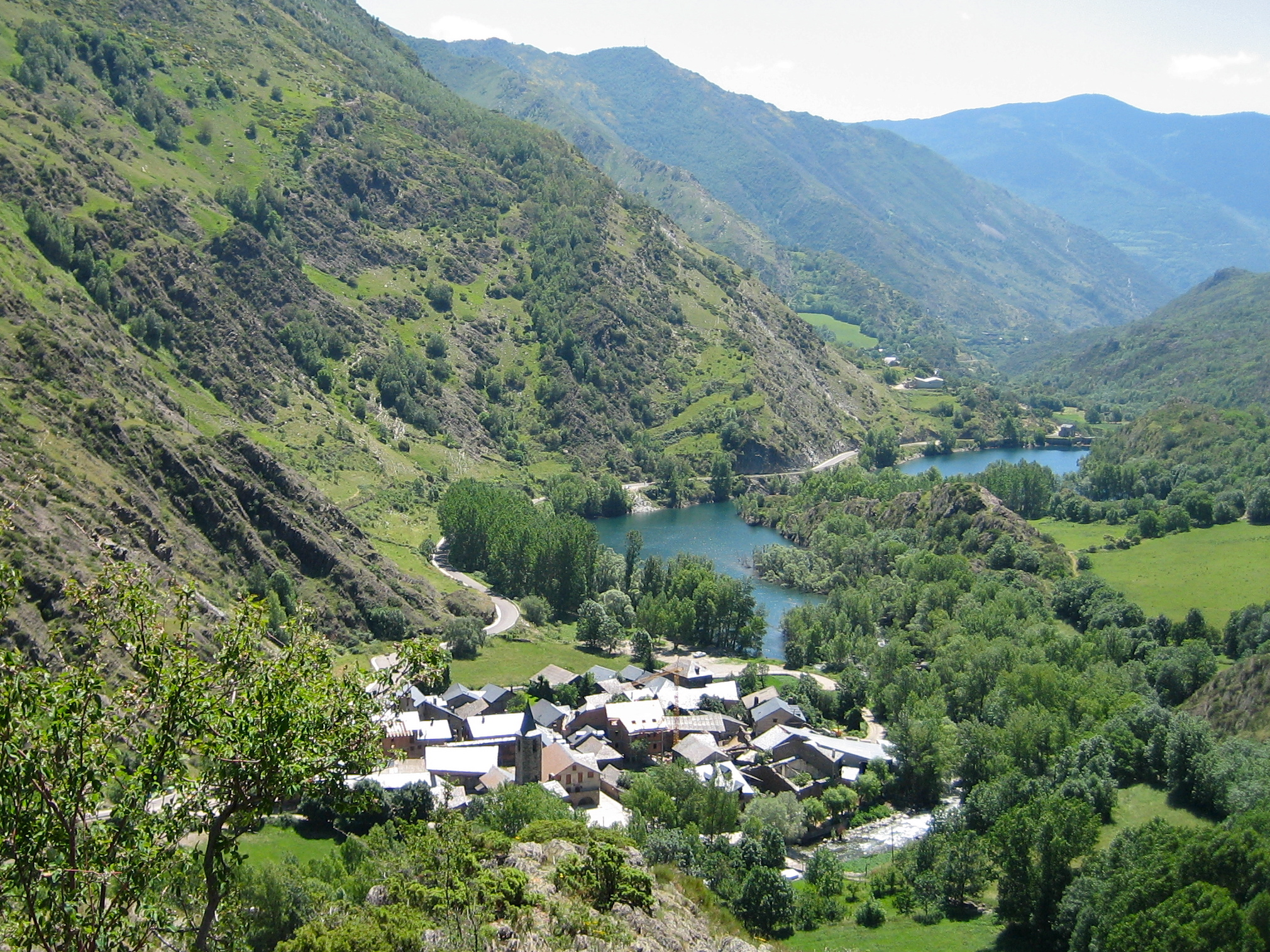

- Location within Province of Lleida Location within Catalonia Location within Spain
- Coordinates: 42°39′35″N 1°4′54″E
- Country: Spain
- Community: Catalonia
- Province: Lleida
- Municipality: Alt Àneu
- Elevation: 1,102 m (3,615 ft)

Population
  - Total: 14

Borén (Catalan pronunciation: [boˈɾen]) is a locality located in the municipality of Alt Àneu, in Province of Lleida province, Catalonia, Spain. As of 2020, it has a population of 14.

== Geography ==
Borén is located 171km north-northeast of Lleida.
