= Àreu =

- Decentralized municipal entity
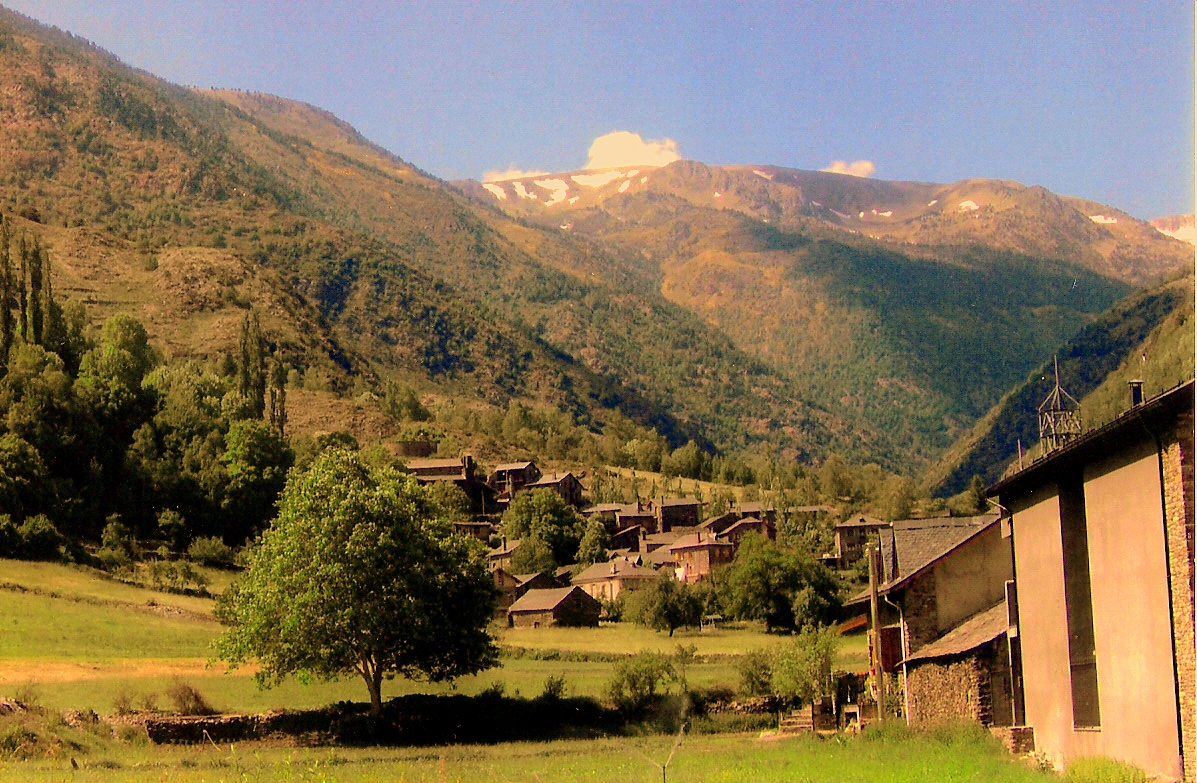

- Location within Province of Lleida Location within Catalonia Location within Spain
- Coordinates: 42°35′17″N 1°19′34″E
- Country: Spain
- Community: Catalonia
- Province: Lleida
- Municipality: Alins
- Elevation: 1,227 m (4,026 ft)

Population
  - Total: 73

Àreu is a locality and decentralized municipal entity located in the municipality of Alins, in Province of Lleida province, Catalonia, Spain. As of 2020, it has a population of 73.

== Geography ==
Àreu is located 163km north-northeast of Lleida.
