= Lladorre =

Municipality in Catalonia, Spain

- Municipality
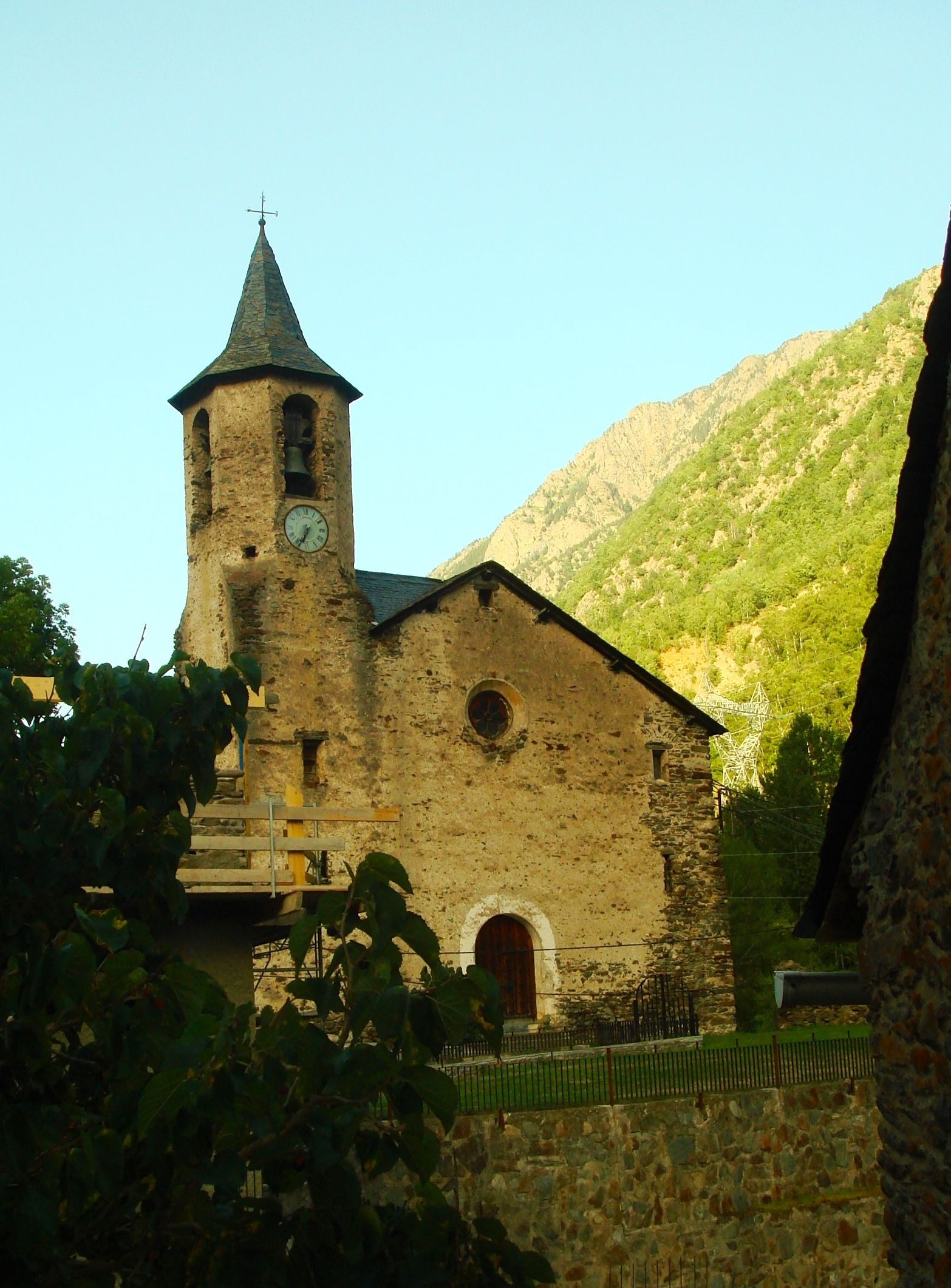
- St. Bartholomew's church, Tavascan

- Coat of arms

- Location in Catalonia and Spain Lladorre (Spain)
- Coordinates: 42°37′N 1°15′E
- Country: Spain
- Community: Catalonia
- Province: Lleida
- Comarca: Pallars Sobirà

Government
  - Mayor: Salvador Tomas Bosch (2015)

Area
  - Total: 147.0 km^{2} (56.8 sq mi)

Population (2025-01-01)
  - Total: 246
  - Density: 1.67/km^{2} (4.33/sq mi)
- Website: lladorre.ddl.net

Lladorre (Catalan pronunciation: [ʎaˈðɔre]) is a village in the province of Lleida and autonomous community of Catalonia, Spain. It has a population of 246 (register office, 2025).
