= Sort, Spain =

Sort
- Municipality
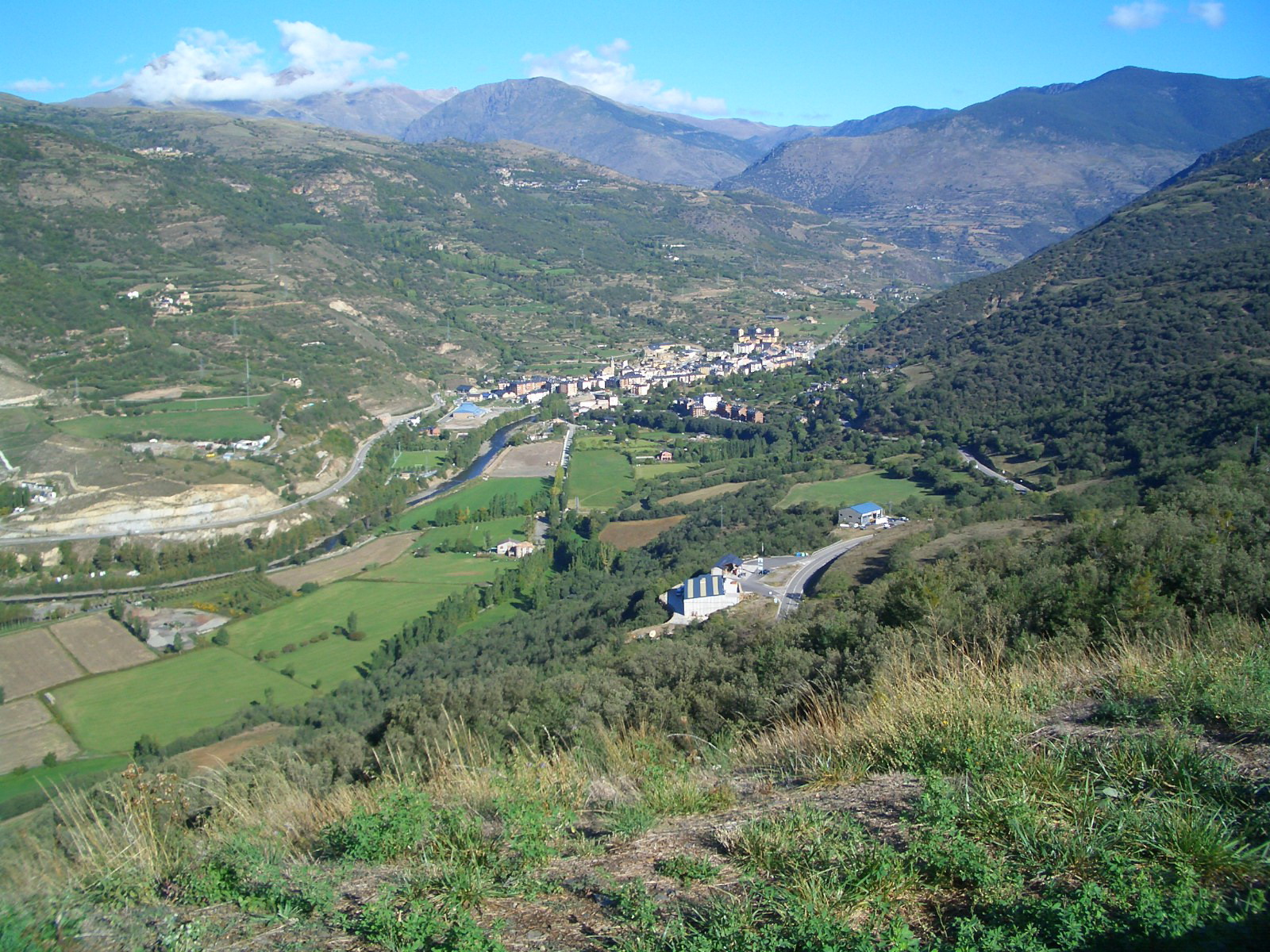

- Flag Coat of arms

- Location in Catalonia
- Coordinates: 42°25′N 1°8′E
- Country: Spain
- Community: Catalonia
- Province: Lleida
- Comarca: Pallars Sobirà

Government
  - Mayor: Raimon Monterde Alberich (2015)

Area
  - Total: 105.0 km^{2} (40.5 sq mi)
- Elevation: 692 m (2,270 ft)

Population (2025-01-01)
  - Total: 2,236
  - Density: 21.30/km^{2} (55.15/sq mi)
- Climate: Cfb
- Website: sort.cat

Sort (Catalan: [ˈsɔrt]) is the capital of the comarca of Pallars Sobirà, in the province of Lleida, Catalonia, in the country of Spain. It is located at 692 metres above the sea, by the river Noguera Pallaresa, a tributary to the Segre. It has a population of 2,236 (register office, 2025).

It was once capital of the County of Pallars.

The origin of the name predates the Roman period and has a different origin from the concept of sort -Catalan for “luck”-. Sort is a toponym of Basque origin, from the word sort, or suert, which meant bridge, referring to the only important bridge that crossed the Noguera Pallaresa river.

The municipality includes the small village of Olp.

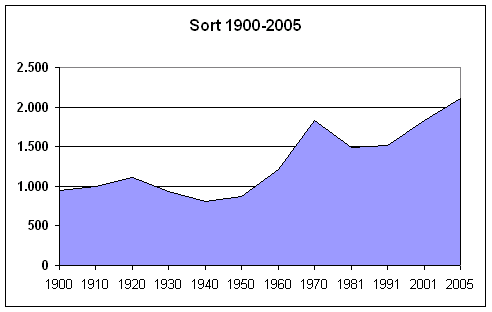
Demographic evolution
