= Alins =

- Municipality
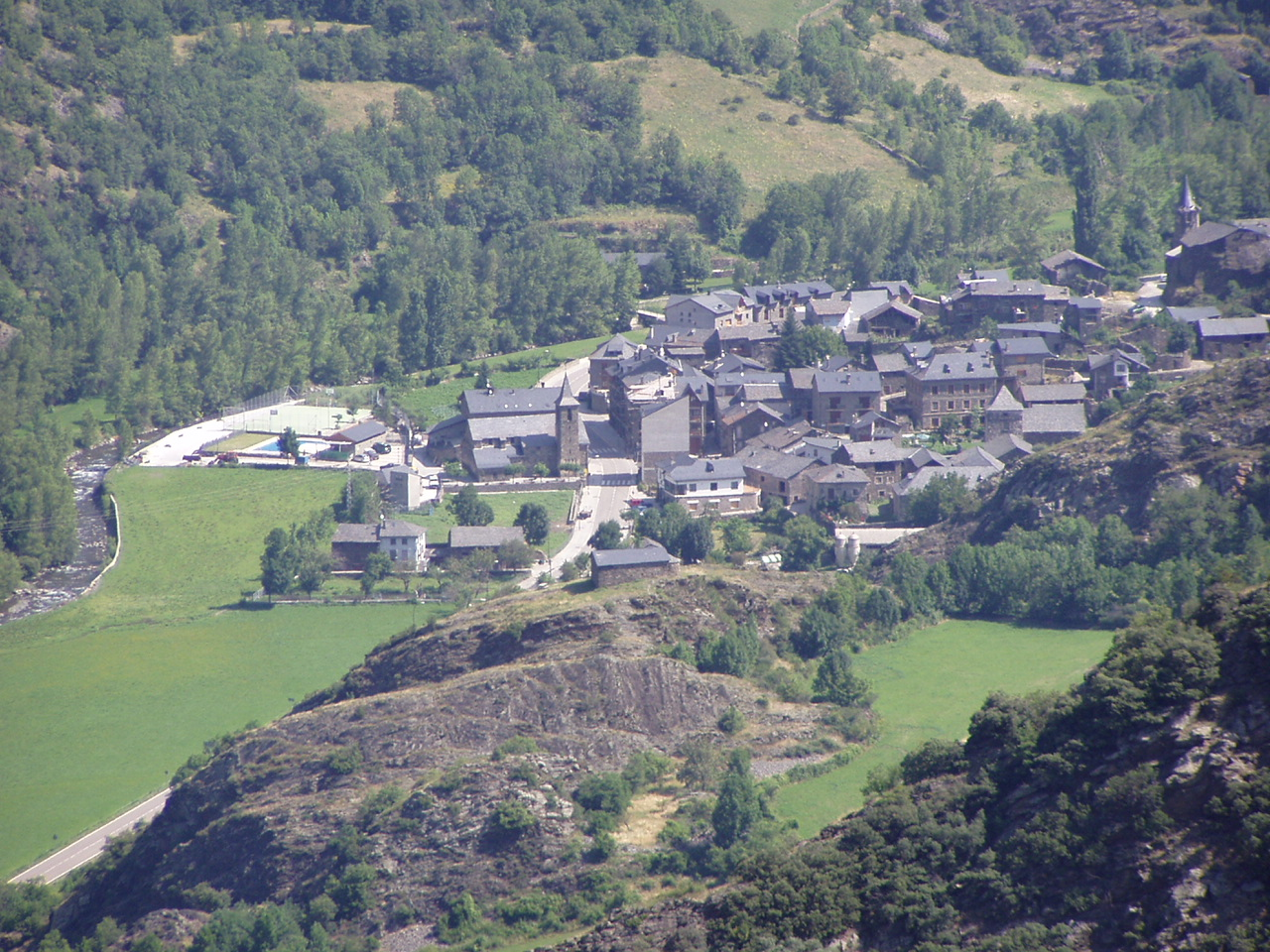

- Coat of arms

- Location in Pallars Sobirà county

- Location within Catalonia Location within Spain
- Coordinates: 42°33′2″N 1°19′11″E
- Sovereign state: Spain
- Community: Catalonia
- Region: Alt Pirineu
- County: Pallars Sobirà
- Province: Lleida

Government
  - Mayor: Manel Pérez Cantalosella (Endavant VallFerrera) (2023)

Area
  - Total: 183.2 km^{2} (70.7 sq mi)
- Elevation: 1,048 m (3,438 ft)

Population (2025-01-01)
  - Total: 269
  - Density: 1.47/km^{2} (3.80/sq mi)
- Postal code: 25017
- Website: alins.ddl.net

Alins (Catalan pronunciation: [aˈlins]) is a town and municipality in Pallars Sobirà county in the Province of Lleida, Catalonia, Spain. It borders Occitania in France and La Massana in Andorra. It has a population of 269 (register office, 2025).

It covers the valleys of the Noguera de Vallferrera and Tor rivers in the north of the county. The Pica d'Estats (3142 m, the highest point in Catalonia) is part of the Montcalm Massif on the frontier between this municipality and Ariège, France. A local road links the municipality with the L-504 road.

== Demography ==
The municipality of Alins is formed of seven villages. Those marked with an asterisk are "delocalised municipal entities" (entitats municipals descentralitzades) and have their own local councils with limited powers. Populations are given as of 2005:

- Ainet de Besan (35)*
- Alins (58)
- Araós (29)*
- Àreu (84)*
- Besan (5)
- Norís (12)
- Tor (25), linked with Andorra by a forest track

== Note ==
1. Entitats municipals descentralitzades are governed by the Llei Municipal i de Règim Local de Catalunya (8/1987 de 15 d'abril de 1987). They correspond to entidades locales menores in the rest of Spain (known as entitats locals menors in the Valencian Community and the Balearic Islands).
