= Pallars Sobirà =

Coordinates: 42°31′18″N 1°11′18″E

- Comarca
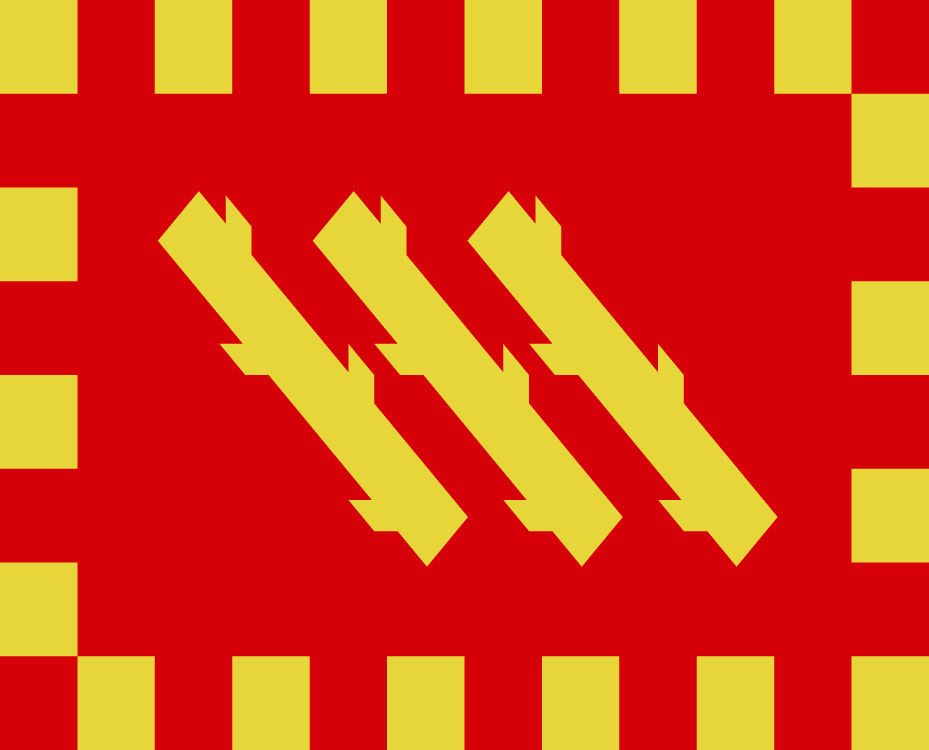
- Flag Coat of arms

- Country: Spain
- Autonomous community: Catalonia
- Province: Lleida
- Region: Alt Pirineu
- Capital: Sort
- Municipalities: List: Alins, Alt Àneu, Baix Pallars, Espot, Esterri d'Àneu, Esterri de Cardós, Farrera, La Guingueta d'Àneu, Lladorre, Llavorsí, Rialp, Soriguera, Sort, Tírvia, Vall de Cardós

Government
  - Body: Pallars Sobirà Comarcal Council
  - President: Carles Isús (Independent)

Area
  - Total: 1,378.0 km^{2} (532.0 sq mi)

Population (2014)
  - Total: 7,220
  - Density: 5.24/km^{2} (13.6/sq mi)
- Demonym
- Time zone: UTC+1 (CET)
  - Summer (DST): UTC+2 (CEST)
- Largest municipality: Sort

Pallars Sobirà (Western Catalan: [paˈʎa(ɾ)s soβiˈɾa]) is a comarca (county) in the northwest region of Alt Pirineu, in Catalonia, Spain. The name means "Upper Pallars", distinguishing it from the more populous (and less mountainous) Pallars Jussà to its southwest. Its capital and largest municipality is Sort.

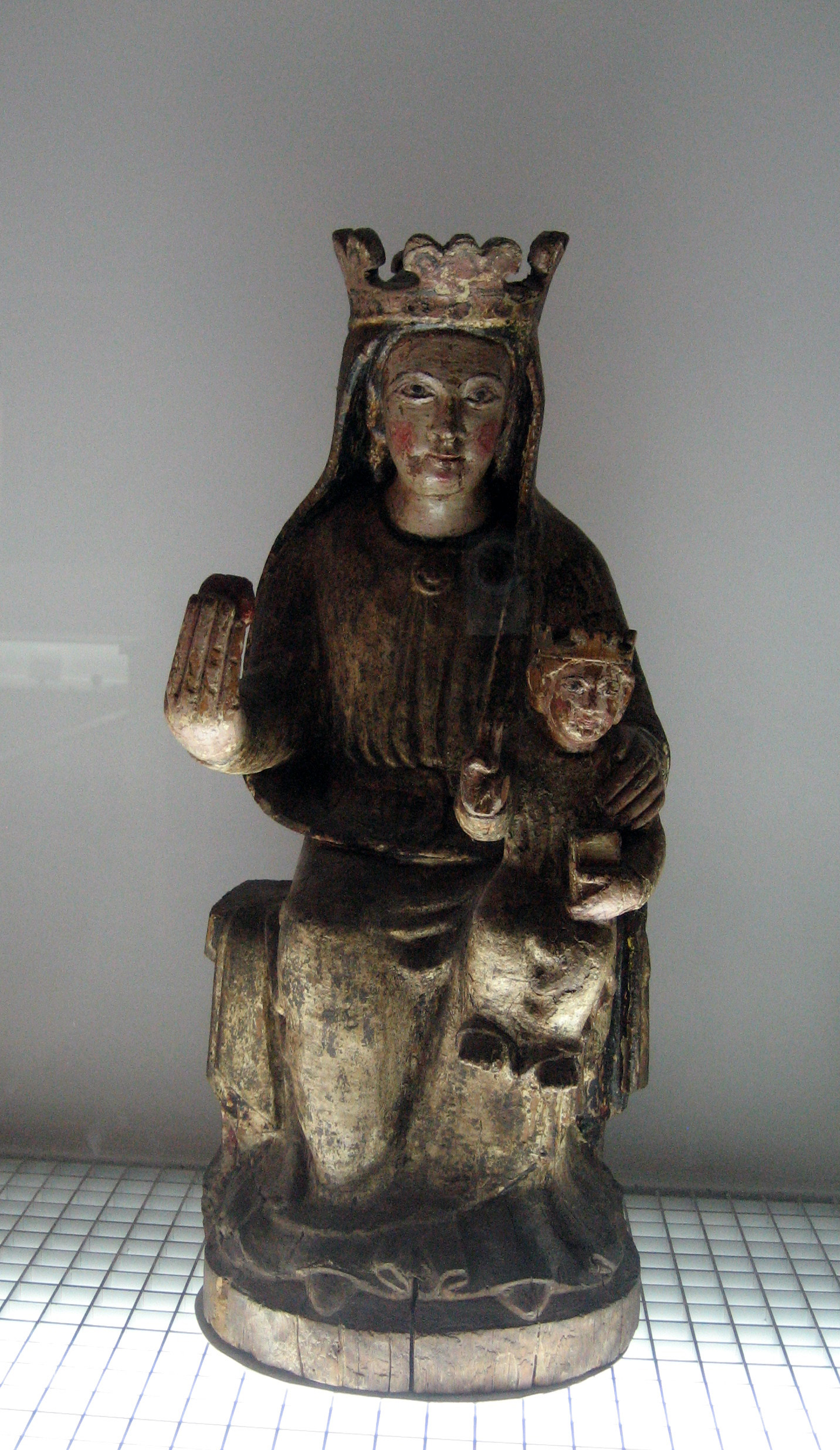
Our Lady of the Mountain, Caregue, Pallars Sobirà

Located in the central Pyrenees, Pallars Sobirà stretches from south to north, starting at the gorge of Collegats to the village of Alós d'Isil, following the course of the river Noguera Pallaresa. It is the fourth biggest comarca in Catalonia in terms of surface area, and has one of the lowest densities of population in the country, about 5.1 inhabitants per km². All together, it has approximately 7,000 inhabitants.

Pallars Sobirà contains the largest lake in the Pyrenees, the lake of Certascan, and the highest peak in Catalonia, the Pica d'Estats (3,143 m).

Most of Pallars Sobirà is a protected nature reserve. There are a few territories that belong to the PEIN (Pla d'Espais d'Interès Natural de Catalunya- Natural Interest Landscape Plan of Catalonia), as Aigüestortes i Estany de Sant Maurici National Park, the Alt Pirineu Natural Park, the Natural Partial Reserve of La Noguera Pallaresa - Collegats, a wide range of areas belonging to the Natura 2000 network, the Natural Hunting Reserve of Boumort, etc.

== Municipalities ==
Municipality	Population (2014)	Area km^{2}
Alins	286	183.2
Alt Àneu	416	217.8
Baix Pallars	361	129.4
Espot	357	97.3
Esterri d'Àneu	866	8.5
Esterri de Cardós	72	16.6
Farrera	125	61.9
La Guingueta d'Àneu	317	108.4
Lladorre	232	147.0
Llavorsí	367	68.5
Rialp	667	63.3
Soriguera	377	106.4
Sort	2,237	105.0
Tírvia	156	8.5
Vall de Cardós	384	56.2
• Total: 15	7,220	1,378.0

== See also ==
- County of Pallars Sobirà
