= Southern apse from Pedret =

Romanesque fresco painting

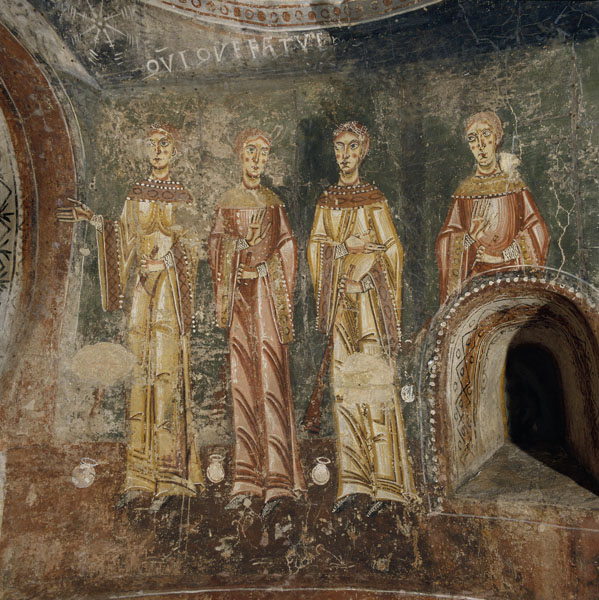
- Artist: Circle of the Master of Pedret
- Year: End of 11th/beginning of 12th century
- Type: Fresco transferred to canvas
- Location: Museu Nacional d'Art de Catalunya; Barcelona

The Southern apse from Pedret is a Romanesque fresco painting from late 11th century or the beginning of the 12th century, which was acquired during the 1919-1923 campaign of the Junta de Museus. The artwork originated from the southern apsidiole of the Church of Sant Quirze de Pedret and is currently exhibited in the Romanesque Art collection at the Museu Nacional d'Art de Catalunya, in Barcelona, Spain.

== History ==
At the end of the eleventh century, the Romanesque mural painting of northern Italy arrived in Catalonia with a spread similar to that of Lombardic Romanesque architecture. The work of Italian painters, then, accompanied the architecture and soon had important repercussions.

The clearest example of this Lombardy-related painting is the Sant Quirze de Pedret ensemble, which stylistically comes close to the paintings of Sant Pere in Àger, Santa Maria in Àneu, and Sant Pere in El Burgal, and to those of Saint-Lizier in Couserans (France), preserved in situ.

The church at Pedret, located in the Pyrenees, was thought to have been elaborately decorated (even without a written history of worshippers) since it was located on the roads connecting Berga, Bagà, and Cerdanya, thus it may have been an important location. Scholars agree that the church's original architecture was Visigothic due to specific construction elements such as the horse-shoe arches, which divide the nave and give entrance to the apses, as well as the insulation of the apses themselves. However, an additional description of Mozarabic has been given as well to describe the architectural style. Various theories on the age of the frescoes have been presented taking into account stylistic trends of the tenth through the twelfth centuries AD and renovations that took place on the church during those time periods as well. The Museum where the frescoes currently reside dates them to be from the end of the eleventh century to the beginning of the twelfth. Due to the fresco's age, it is probable that the Southern apse from Pedret is one of the oldest of all Catalan Romanesque wall paintings.

The National Art Museum of Catalonia keeps the two side apses from Sant Quirze de Pedret and the Museu Diocesà i Comarcal in Solsona keeps the decoration of the central apse. Taken together they present an important apocalyptic series in which the subject of the Church is related to the coming of the Day of Judgement in a way that is not frequent, centering on the parable of the wise and foolish Virgins in the southern apsidiole.

== Description ==
The apse's dimensions are 325 x 315 x 320 cm, and it contains several images although the most prominent one is a fragmentary image of the Wise and Foolish Virgins parable found in Matthew 25:1-13. Three of the five Wise Virgins' heads have been removed due to historic construction on the church building; however, all figures seem to be wearing similar embroidered dalmatics and tunics with close-fitting sleeves that are worn below the open-fitted sleeves of the dalmatics. The Virgins are crowned with bridal crowns resting on caps and are seen wearing spiral earrings. The crowns resemble those found in Rome during the sixth century. Originally, all five Wise Virgins were depicted seated at the marriage supper with burning cressets in their left hands. The Bridegroom figure (Christ) is all but gone however his hand can be seen extending over the table. On the other side of the scene are the five Foolish Virgins. The Foolish Virgins are not clothed in the intricate dalmatics as the Wise Virgins, and they do not wear crowns. Instead, they don coifs that are arranged in folds over their hair. Also unlike the Wise Virgins, the five Foolish Virgins hold their cressets inverted with oil vessels hanging from them. Beneath the virgins is a pattern described as “medallions of beasts.” A young figure is also pictured sitting upon a church with the head encircled by a nimbus (halo). There is a discrepancy as to whether the figure is male or female, and to the object that is held in the figure’s hand. Suggestions have been wand, lily or palm. What can be agreed upon is that this image is a personification of the church. Trace figures of the Archangel Gabriel and the Virgin Mary were once reported, but have since faded entirely although the inscription SCA (Sancta) MARIA was recorded. An image of the Theotokos holding the infant Jesus was also present but was covered with mortar during repairs. There is a fret pattern below the illustrated figures along with simulated drapery present. The apse's window is also decorated with a geometric pattern.

== Composition ==
The composition of this painting is fresco transferred to canvas and the artwork is attributed to the Circle of the Master of Pedret.

== Analysis ==
These frescoes are attributed to have created by Circle of the Master Pedret and are said to be examples of the early Catalan school. Stylistically their frescoes are linked to similar Italian artwork and show signs of early Byzantine iconography as well as illusionism. The parable of the Wise and Foolish Virgins found in Pedret is related to earlier religious illustrations such as Coemiterious Maius and the Rossano Gospels. In the parable, those who are wise and have kept their torches lit are received by the Bridegroom, whereas those who are foolish and who have let their torches become extinguished have been excluded from Paradise. This is in reference to Judgment Day where only those who are prepared will be able to enter the Lord's house. This particular parable seems to have become extremely popular around the eleventh century. Personification of the Church appears to be influenced by Mozarabic liturgy, whereas reference to the ten virgins is found in other liturgies.
