= La Guingueta d'Àneu =

- Municipality
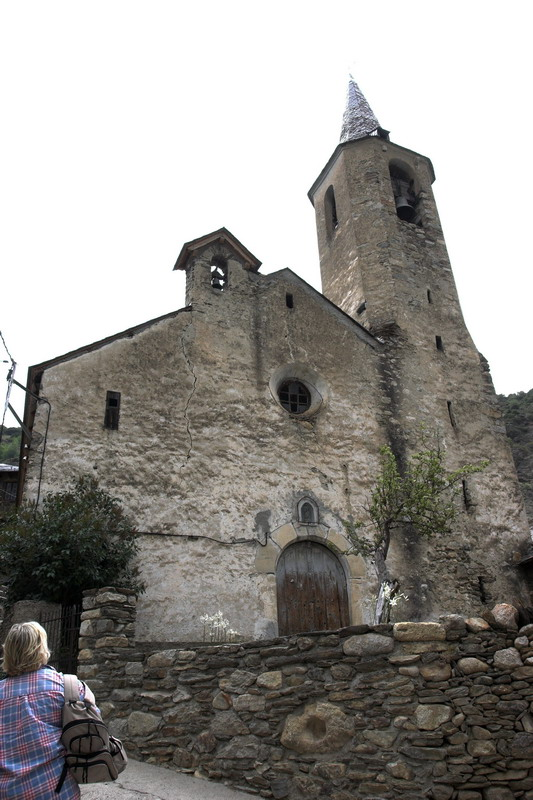
- St. Peter's church, in Jou

- Coat of arms

- Location in Catalonia
- Coordinates: 42°35′43″N 1°08′00″E
- Country: Spain
- Community: Catalonia
- Province: Lleida
- Comarca: Pallars Sobirà

Government
  - Mayor: Josep Antoni Cervós Costansa (2015)

Area
  - Total: 108.4 km^{2} (41.9 sq mi)
- Elevation: 938 m (3,077 ft)

Population (2025-01-01)
  - Total: 278
  - Density: 2.56/km^{2} (6.64/sq mi)
- Website: guingueta.ddl.net

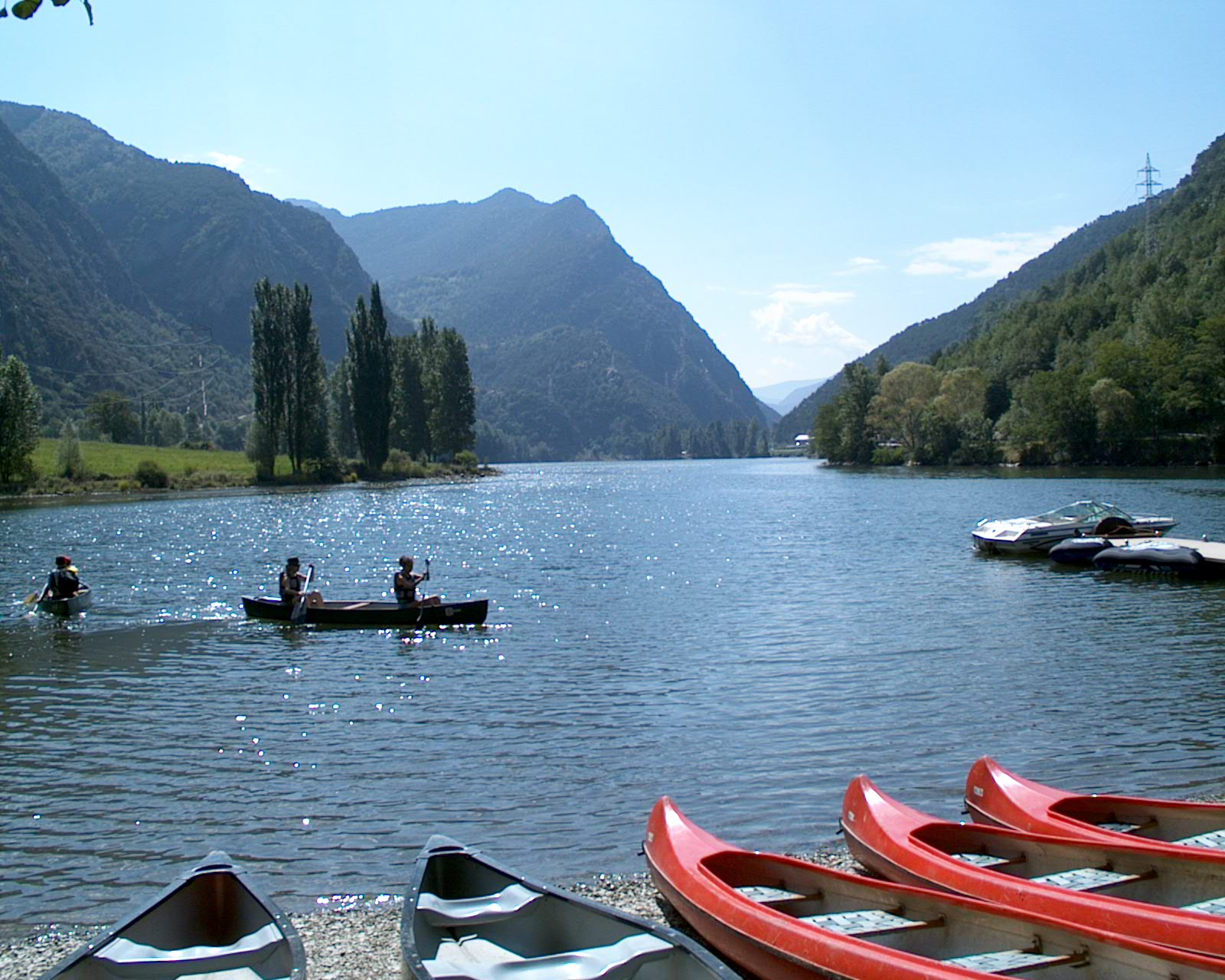
Reservoir of la Torrassa

La Guingueta d'Àneu (Catalan pronunciation: [la ɣiŋˈgeta ˈðanew]) is a municipality in the comarca of the Pallars Sobirà in Catalonia, Spain. It is situated in the valley of the Noguera Pallaresa river below the reservoir of La Torrassa. It is linked to Sort by the C-147 road. It has a population of 278 (register office, 2025).

== Subdivisions ==
The municipality of la Guingueta d'Àneu is formed of thirteen villages. Populations are given as of 2005:

- Berrós Jussà (24)
- Burgo (7)
- Cerbi (20), on the right bank of the Unarre river, at the foot of Mont-roig mountain (2864 m)
- Dorve (11), near in the Turó de l'Àliga mountain (1744 m)
- Escalarre (26), on the left bank of the Unarre river
- Escaló (95), on the C-147 road
- Escart (16), on the left bank of the Escart river
- Estaron (16), on the slopes of the Aurati range
- Gavàs (17)
- La Guingueta (78)
- Jou (25), in the north-east of the municipality
- Llavorre (5)
- Unarre (14), in the valley of the Unarre river

== Demography ==
| 1900 | 1930 | 1950 | 1970 | 1986 | 2007 |
|---|---|---|---|---|---|
| 1126 | 1021 | 868 | 404 | 261 | 370 |

== See also ==
- Sant Pere del Burgal
- Apse of Santa Maria d'Àneu, a romanesque apse of the church of Santa Maria d'Àneu, the transferred frescos from which are now exhibited at Museu Nacional d'Art de Catalunya.
- Paintings from El Burgal
