= Sant Quirze de Pedret =

Church in Catalonia, Spain

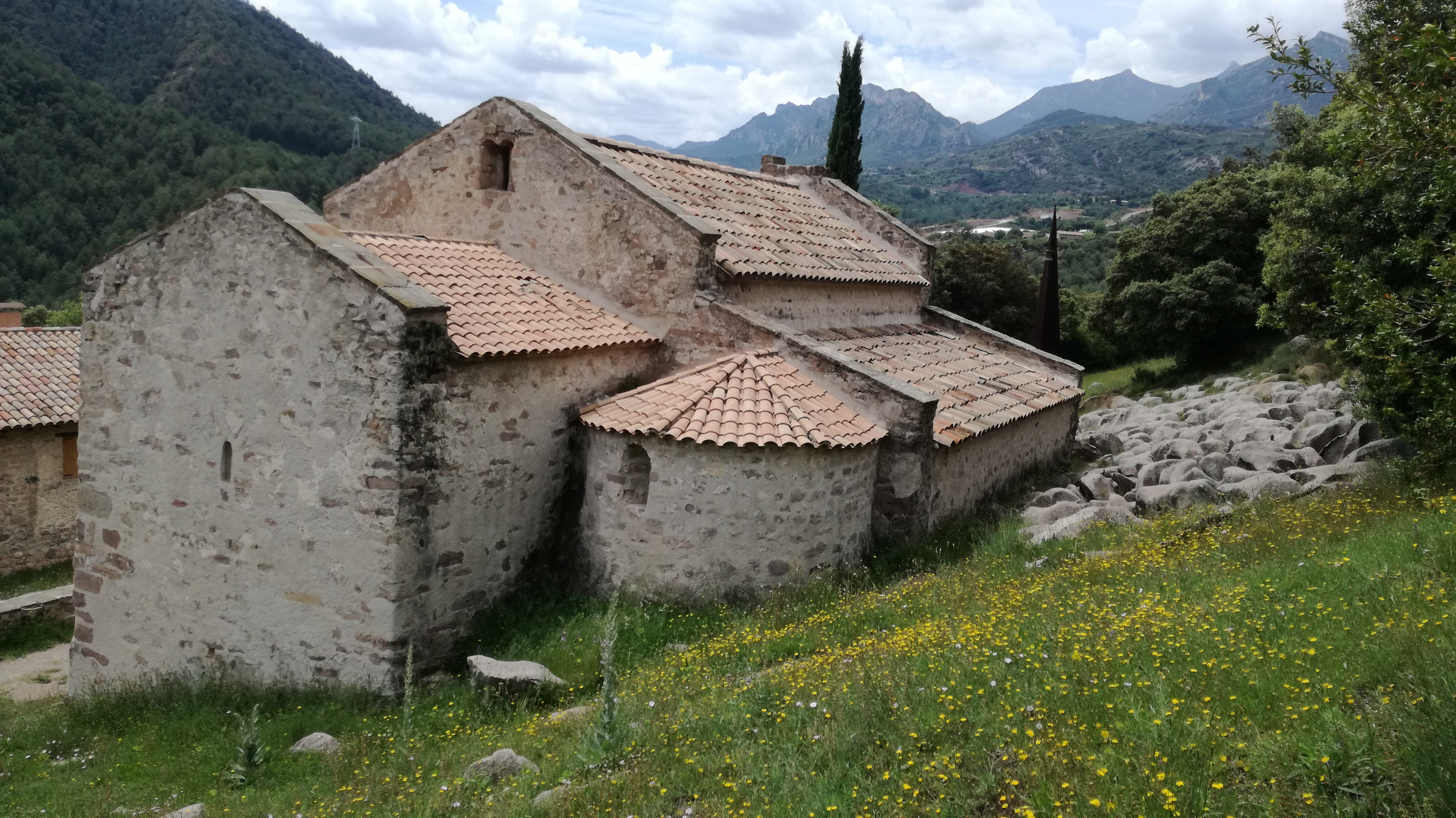
- Sant Quirze de Pedret

Religion
- Affiliation: Roman Catholic
- Province: Diocese of Solsona

Location
- Location: Spain
- Interactive map of Sant Quirze de Pedret
- Coordinates: 42°06′27″N 1°53′01″E

Architecture
- Type: Church
- Style: Romanesque

Sant Quirze de Pedret is a pre-Romanesque church in Cercs, Spain. It is one of the few tenth-century buildings in Catalonia and is known for its 12th-century Romanesque murals by the so-called Master of Pedret. The rich iconographic programme depicts a variety of ecclesiological and eschatological themes that connect with the Late Antique and Byzantine artistic traditions in Italy and with the Gregorian reform movement. The murals' rediscovery and study in the early twentieth century significantly contributed to establishing the importance of Catalan Romanesque mural painting. The original murals were taken to the Museu Nacional d'Art de Catalunya and the diocesan museum of Solsona for protection; copies have been painted in their original settings.

== History ==
=== Middle Ages ===
The church of Sant Quirze de Pedret is situated some kilometers to the east of Berga in the former county of Cerdanya.

The first definitive mention of the church dates to 1248 in diplomatic correspondence of the monastery of Sant Pere de la Portella, where the church is mentioned as parrochia Sancti Quirici de Pedreto, but it was built much earlier. While the consecration has been previously dated to 819 or 839 based on a mention of the church in a registry of the bishopric of Urgell, the reference is not clear, though a first church was built in either the same or in the tenth century. It is likely that its construction occurred within campaign of count Wilfred I of Urgell and Cerdanya to resettle and organise the territory that so far had been a border region with the Muslim caliphate, especially after he gained the counties of Barcelona, Osona and Girona. Documents from 983 and 984 indicate the existence of settlements in Pedret, organised in holdings and served by a parish church, i.e. Sant Quirze, which was likely a suffragan of the monastery of Sant Llorenç prop Bagà.

The first recorded parish visit dates to 1312 and more information about the church comes through testaments in the fourteenth century. In 1306, countess Sibilla of Pallars Sobirà reclaimed the nearby castle and the surroundings from king James II of Aragon, as it had been confiscated previously, but Pedret passed definitively into royal possession in 1320. The church and the region fell into decline due to the Black Death in the late fourteenth century, and in 1592 it lost its parish status, becoming a dependent church of Baells.

=== Modern history ===
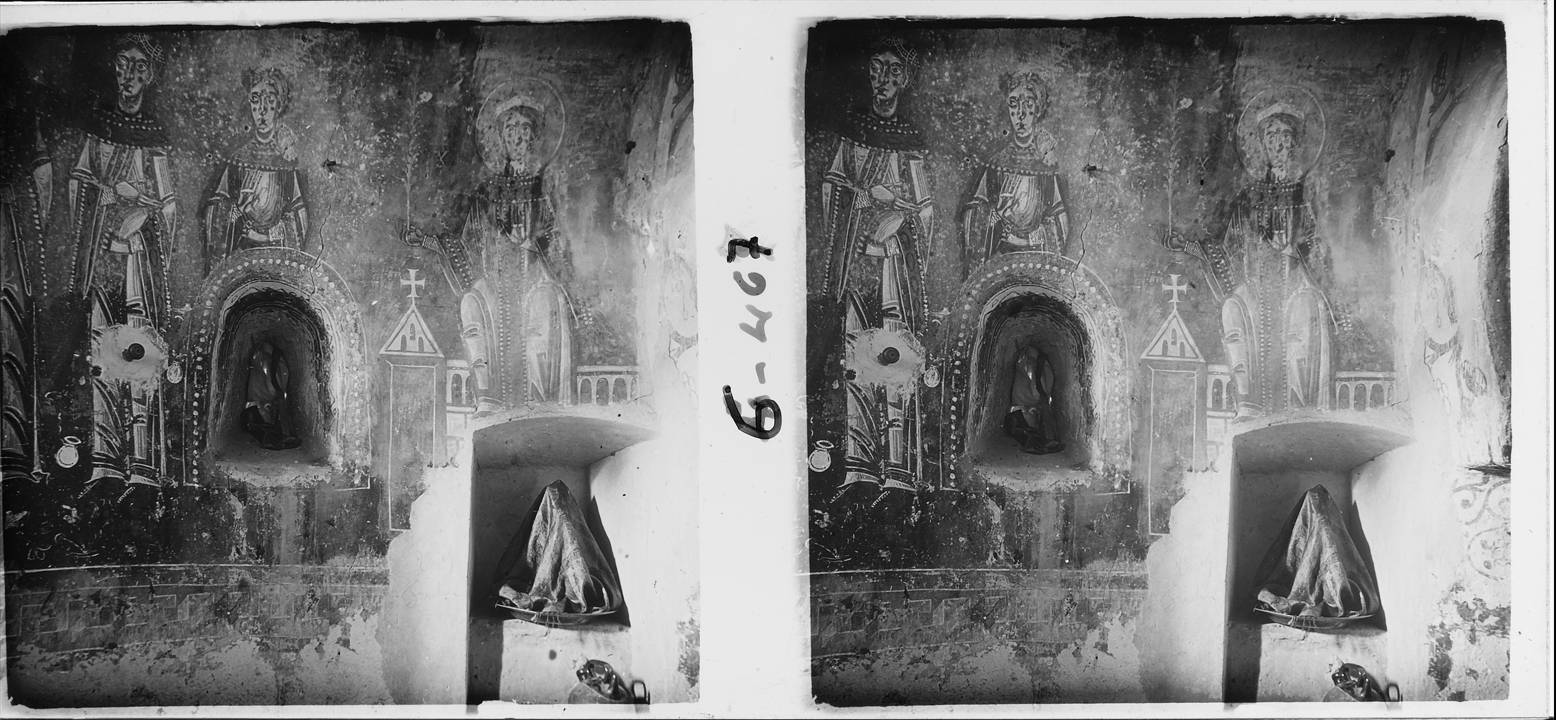
Early photograph of the murals taken in 1918 by Josep Salvany i Blanch

The church became known again in the late nineteenth century due to its mural paintings which in turn helped to popularise Catalan Romanesque murals. The paintings became the earliest studied Catalan Romanesque paintings in articles by F. Muns (1887) and J.Puiggarí (1889), marking a milestone in the study of historiography of Romanesque art in Catalonia. Puiggarí's article was accompanied by drawings which were the first reproduction of a mural decoration published in the context of Catalan Romanesque art. In 1907, the recently founded Institute for Catalan Studies started publishing the series Pintures murals catalanes by Josep Pijoan, the first volume was dedicated to Sant Quirze de Pedret, which made them famous. According to Pijoan, when the first fascicle dedicated to the Pedret murals was published and a copy of it was brought to the famous club of the Modernists at the Continental, the painter Rusiñol—typically noted for his quick humour—was uncharacteristically stunned on seeing it, while his fellow painter and art critic Utrillo said: "They should do things like this all the time." The paintings were also made known in Pijoan's article in The Burlington Magazine on Catalan Romanesque mural painting from 1911, which included one of the photographs taken for the Pintures murals catalanes. The murals of Pedret also became the subject of what was likely the first study of a Catalan Romanesque mural painting written from the standpoint of modern art crisicism in an article by art critic Raimon Casellas on 7 February 1908, further helping to establish the artistic importance of Catalan Romanesque murals. (Note: Casellas described the murals of Pedret as "rudimentary as the painting of a child and at the same time powerful, very powerful, like a wine stored in the cellar for centuries.")

The rediscovery also stirred the interest of the growing global art market of the time. After the mural paintings of the apse of the church of Santa Maria de Mur were sold and removed in 1919/20 (they were later sold to the Museum of Fine Arts in Boston where they have remained since), the Junta de Museus (Barcelona Museums Board) started a campaign to purchase and remove Pyrenean mural paintings to prevent their sale and expatriation and preserve them in the Barcelona Museum of Catalan Art. As part of this campaign, which lasted from 1919 to 1923, the paintings from the side apses of Pedret were removed by Franco Steffanoni using the strappo technique in June/July 1921 and exhibited in the Barcelona Museum from 1924 onwards. In 1937, during the Spanish Civil War, the murals of the central apse were removed and first taken to Barcelona and then in 1940 to the recently created Museum of Solsona (Museu Diocesà i Comarcal de Solsona). The Pedret paintings were used on Spanish Tourism Board posters in 1930 to promote tourism to Spain. (Note: The poster, created by Francesc Galí, depicted a idealised version of the Pedret murals with a window that did showed Sitgues, rather than the Berguedà mountains. The poster was published in three languages: in Spanish and French it promoted Spain, while in English the slogan was "Vi-sit Barcelona".)

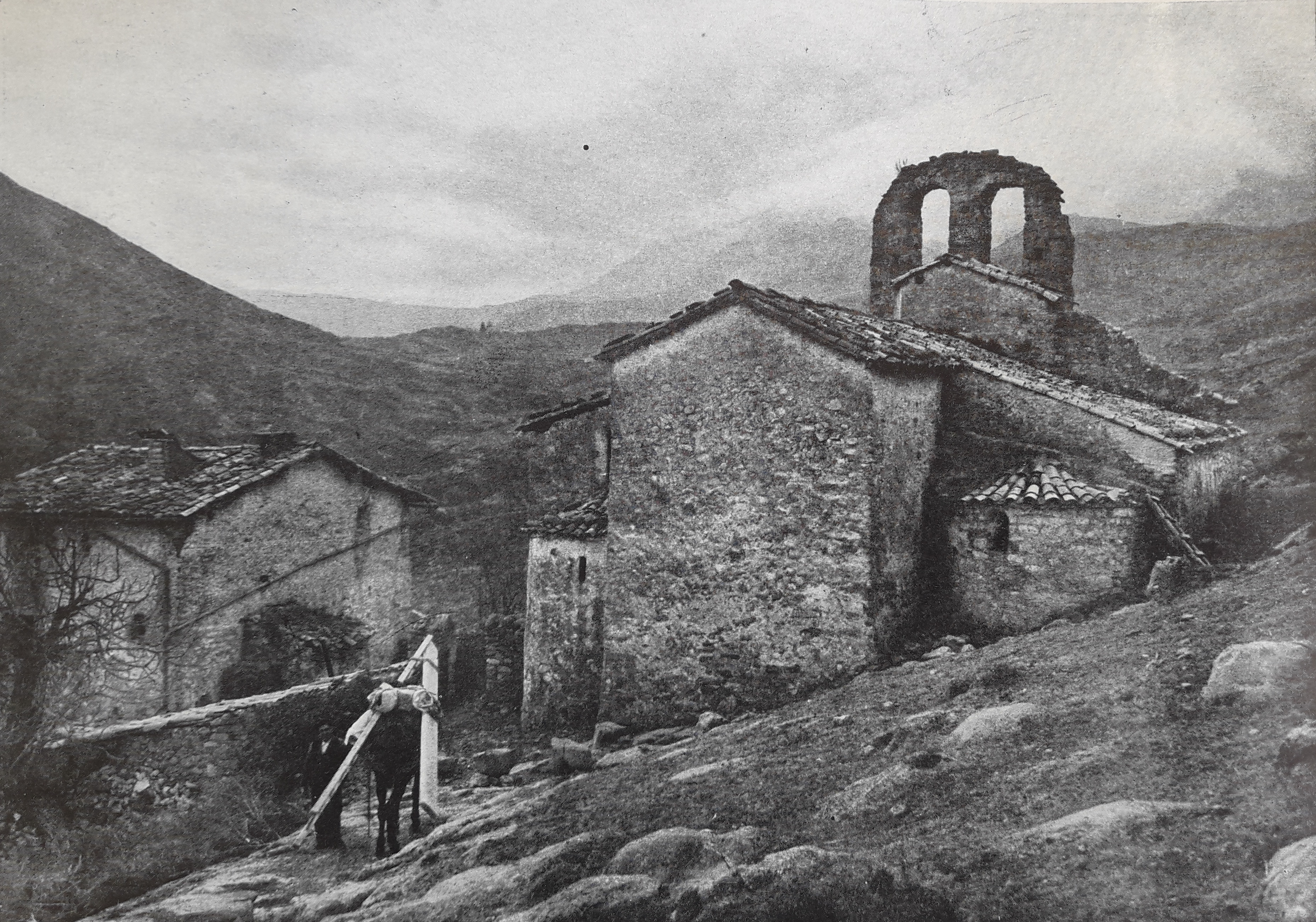
Church of Sant Quirze around 1940

In 1959, the diocese of Solsona handed the church over to the care of the town council of Berga so that it could be better maintained. At the request of both the diocese and the town council, it was restored by the Barcelona Provincial Council between 1959 and 1964 under architect Camil Pallàs and builder Modest Buchaca. Two decades later, the church required new renovation which was started in 1989 by the Provincial Council under architect Antoni González. The intention was to restore Sant Quirze de Pedret to the appearance it likely had in the tenth century, based on the fact that the church is one of the few remaining tenth-century buildings in Catalonia. Nevertheless, not all of its later, Romanesque features were removed, such as the thirteenth-century portal or the remains of the bell tower from the same century. Also, some of the medieval paintings in the church were restored or reproduced according to medieval topography and approaches.

== Architecture ==
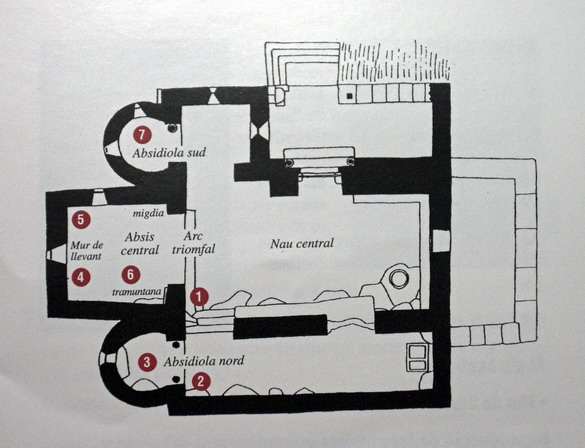
Architectural plan of Sant Quirze

The church was built in four phases. In the first phase, dated to either the 9th or 10th century, a single-nave building with a trapezoidal apse and an entrance in the west wall was built. In the second phase, between the mid-10th and early 11th centuries, the walls of the nave and the apse were raised. The apse was covered with the horseshoe vault that is preserved today, and two side aisles and their corresponding apsidal chapels with arched entrances were added. The aisles were connected by two horseshoe arches on each side, and the doorway was moved to the south side. During this phase, the church received its first pictorial decoration, fragments of which remain in the main apse and the central nave.

In the third phase, dated to the end of the 11th century, a section was added to the west, though its function remains uncertain. In that phase most of the Romanesque murals were painted, and it seems that the northern apse was remodelled. The fourth and final construction phase, dated to the 13th century, was due to an unknown incident that caused the collapse of two-thirds of the south nave. Major works were carried out such as the demolition of the western section, the covering of the central nave with a pointed barrel vault and a new late, Romanesque style doorway. A great bell tower was built in the 18th century and was later pulled down during the restoration in the 20th century, due to its bad condition, and as it was out of harmony with the pre-Romanesque building.

== Paintings ==
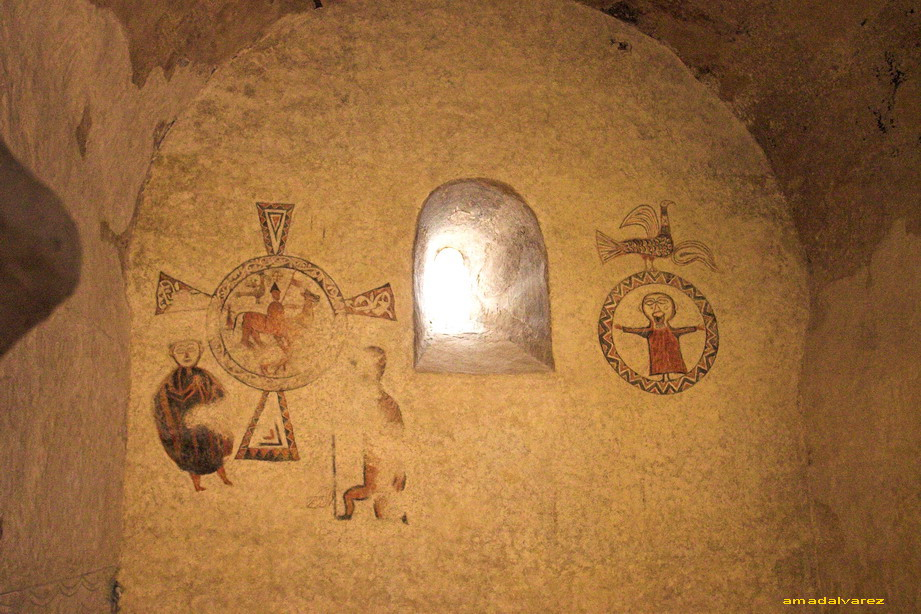
The pre-Romanesque paintings of Pedret: the knight (left) and the Orant (right)

The oldest mural paintings in the church of Sant Quirze date to the early 11th century, which later remained under a new and rich decoration layer that dates to the early 12th century. The 11th-century paintings were originally in the central apse and are known as the Orant (sometimes identified as St. John the Apostle) and the Knight (also identified as St. Maurice) and are now preserved in the Diocesan and District Museum of Solsona. A third fragment, a crucifixion, has been found on the north wall.

Most of the paintings, however, were painted in the early 12th century. The main theme of the murals in the central apse is the Christian apocalypse, depicting the Throne with the Book of the Seven seals, twenty-four enthroned elders, the Four Horsemen of the Apocalypse and Christ in Majesty and the Tetramorph in the apse vault. The chancel shows the martyrdom of the patron saints Cyricus and Julitta and the offering of Cain and Abel. The murals in the southern, or right lateral apse (also called the "Epistle side apse"), are better preserved and show the parabel of the wise and foolish virgins. The northern, or left lateral apse shows the apostolic college and is also called the "Gospel side apse".

The murals show a high technical command in both the regularity of the pictoral layer and in the grinding and uniform distribution of the pigments. They were made with the help of minerals found in the Pyrenees, such as haematite for red, goethite for yellow ochre, and aerinite for blue. The paintings are of an unusual figurative language, based on illusionism of late Antique and Byzantine art, with figures placed in different planes, parts of landscapes, faces coloured with flesh tones and loose clothing with shadows that give the impression of corporeity and spatial three-dimensionality. The elaborate clothing of the virgins and the way the faces are conceived, using three concentric circles, are also reminiscent of Byzantine art, while the ornamental and thematic repertory is also highly original.

The murals in Pedret are similar to those of many other Catalan churches from the same time, such as of the apse of Santa Maria, Àneu or the paintings from El Burgal, but it is not known, how widespread murals were at the time in Catalonia. Next to nothing is known about the artists and workshops who painted the murals, their origin and social status, how they worked or who their patrons were. Attempts have been made to deduce information on the basis of likely influences and of a comparison of styles. Based on the similarity of the paintings between those in Pedret and those of Santa Maria, Àneu, Sant Pere of El Burgal and Santa Maria de Cap d'Aran, they have been attributed to a hypothetical workshop called the Master of Pedret.

As the frescoes show similarities with certain churches in Lombardy, such as the Basilica di San Vincenzo, San Pierro al Monte in Civate, San Carlo in Prugiasco and Carugo (all of which are dated to the late 11th century), a Lombard origin for the artists or their master has been suggested. Additionally, many saints, who were primarily venerated in Lombardy such as Pierius, who is depicted in Sant Quirze de Pedret, point to a connection. While this is true for the pictorial style, the iconographic repertoires and details, on the other hand, have more similarities with central and southern Italian churches. The liturgical cloth with facing birds that covers the altar of the holocaust in the central apse of Pedret is similar to the decoration of San Nicola in Carcere, Rome (c. 1120) and the representation of the Apocalypse in that same central apse is reminiscent of the cycle of Sant'Anastasio in Castel Sant'Elia or the crypt of the Anagni Cathedral.

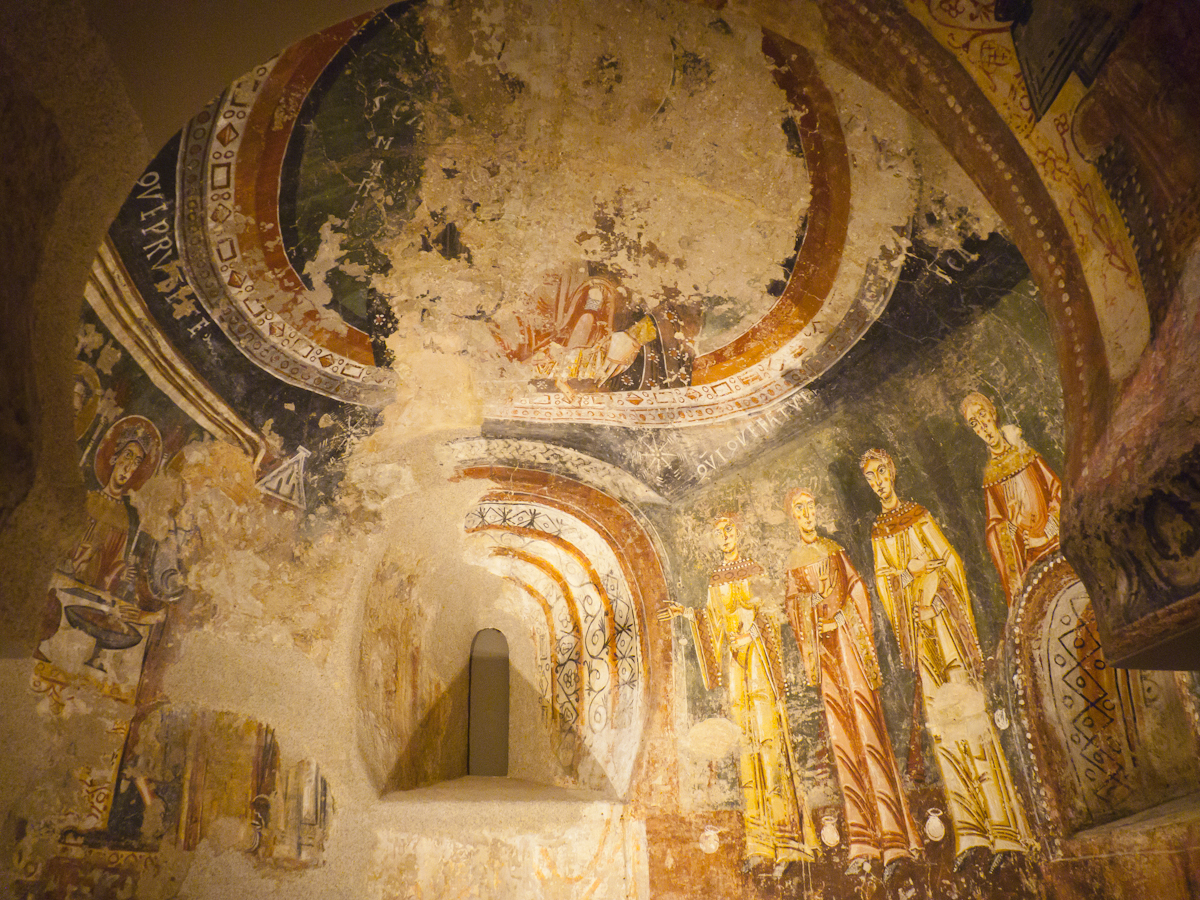
The southern apse with the parable of the ten virgins

The similarities with Italian sites can be explained twofold. Regarding the ornaments, especially in Lombardy, a strong continuity between Late antiquity and the Middle Ages has been observed, as Carolingian elites adopted the use of classical motifs. Catalan counties, as part of the Carolingian cultural sphere, also started using them. The use of the same figures and symbols on the other hand can be attributed to the ecclesiastical reform of the second half of the eleventh century, known as the Gregorian Reform, which emanated from Rome to other Latin Christian regions. The iconographic programmes used by the reform movement sought to express the return to the origins of the Church of Rome.

For instance, the depiction of the apostolic college fits well with the Gregorian reform that argued for the predominance of the spiritual over the temporal powers. Many of the paintings have both ecclesiological and eschatological tones, such as the Parable of the Ten Virgins. According to St. Augustine, the parable symbolised the universal Church, where the bride and the bridegroom are symbols of the Church and Christ. Additionally, the mural has been linked to the liturgical play Sponsus, written in the French abbey of Saint Martial in Limoges at the end of the eleventh century, in which Jesus makes a small speech at the end about the consequences of the actions of the virgins. This references the Last Judgement and the Apocalypse, which is also a topic of many other murals.

== Gallery ==
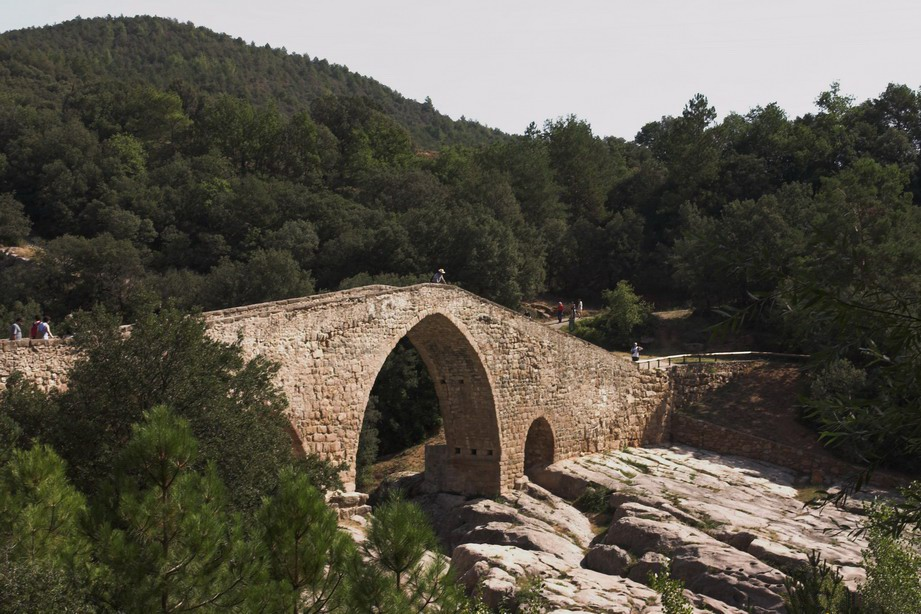
Medieval bridge to the church of Pedret

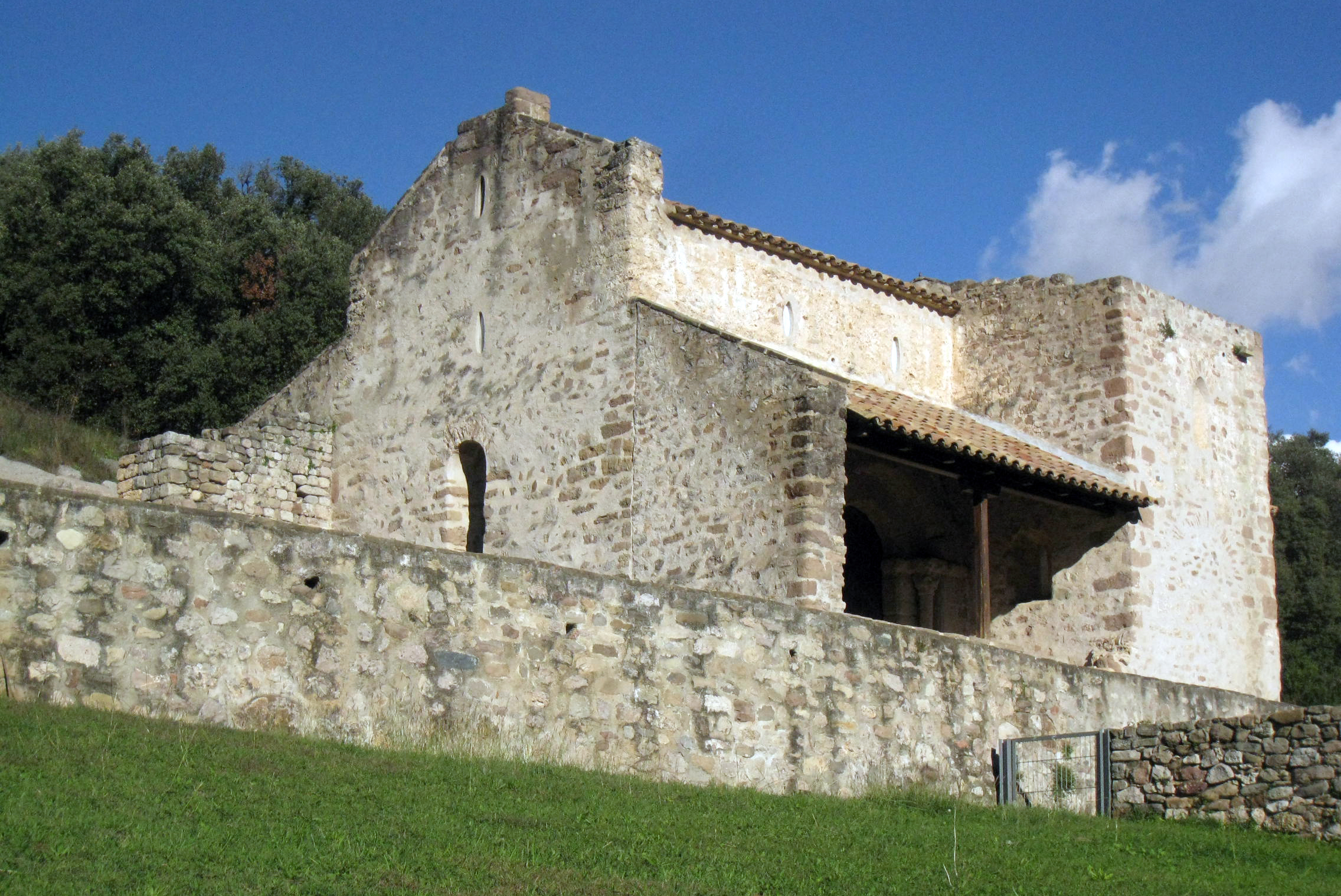
Full view of the church from the west

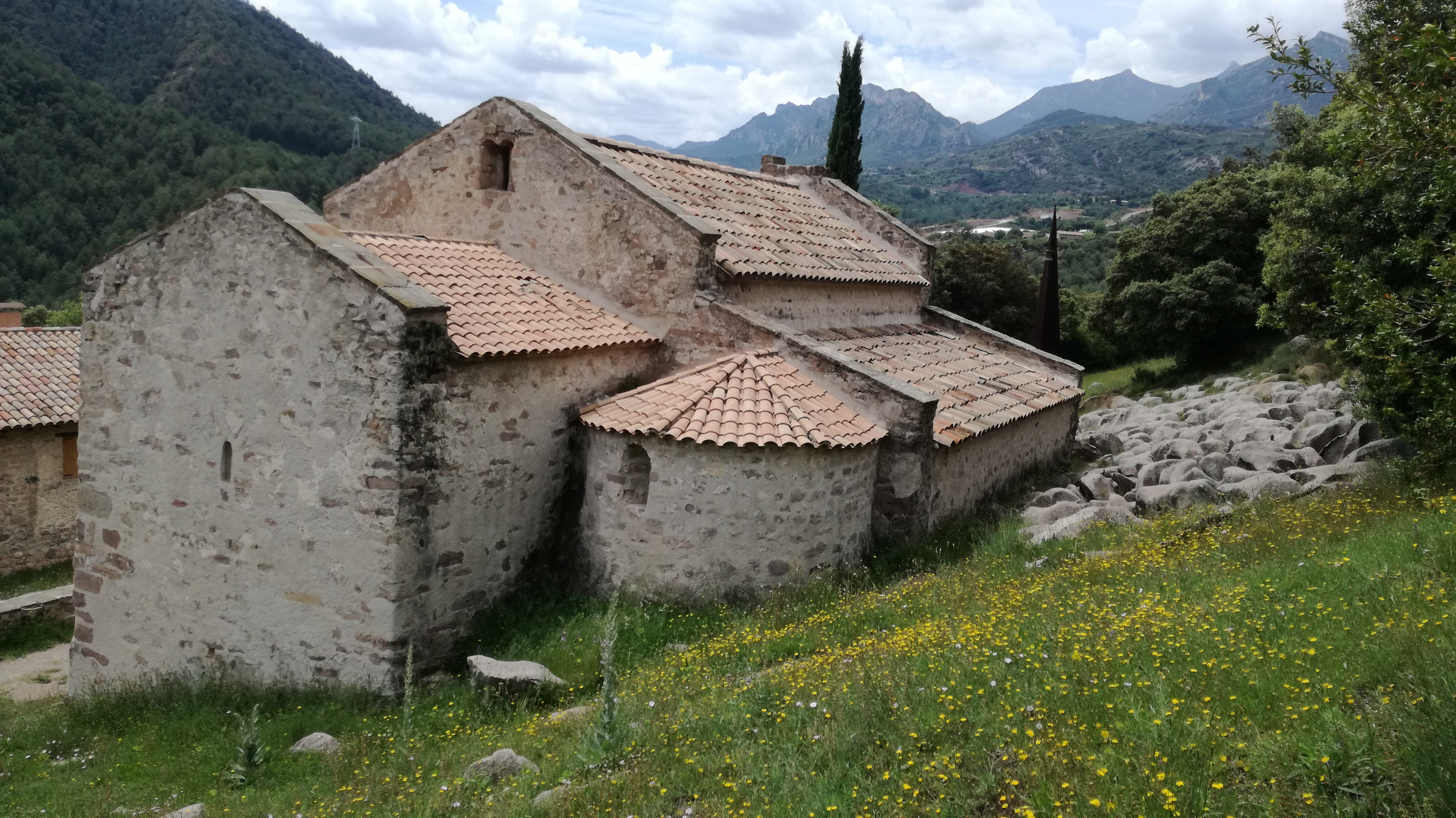
Full view of the church from the northeast

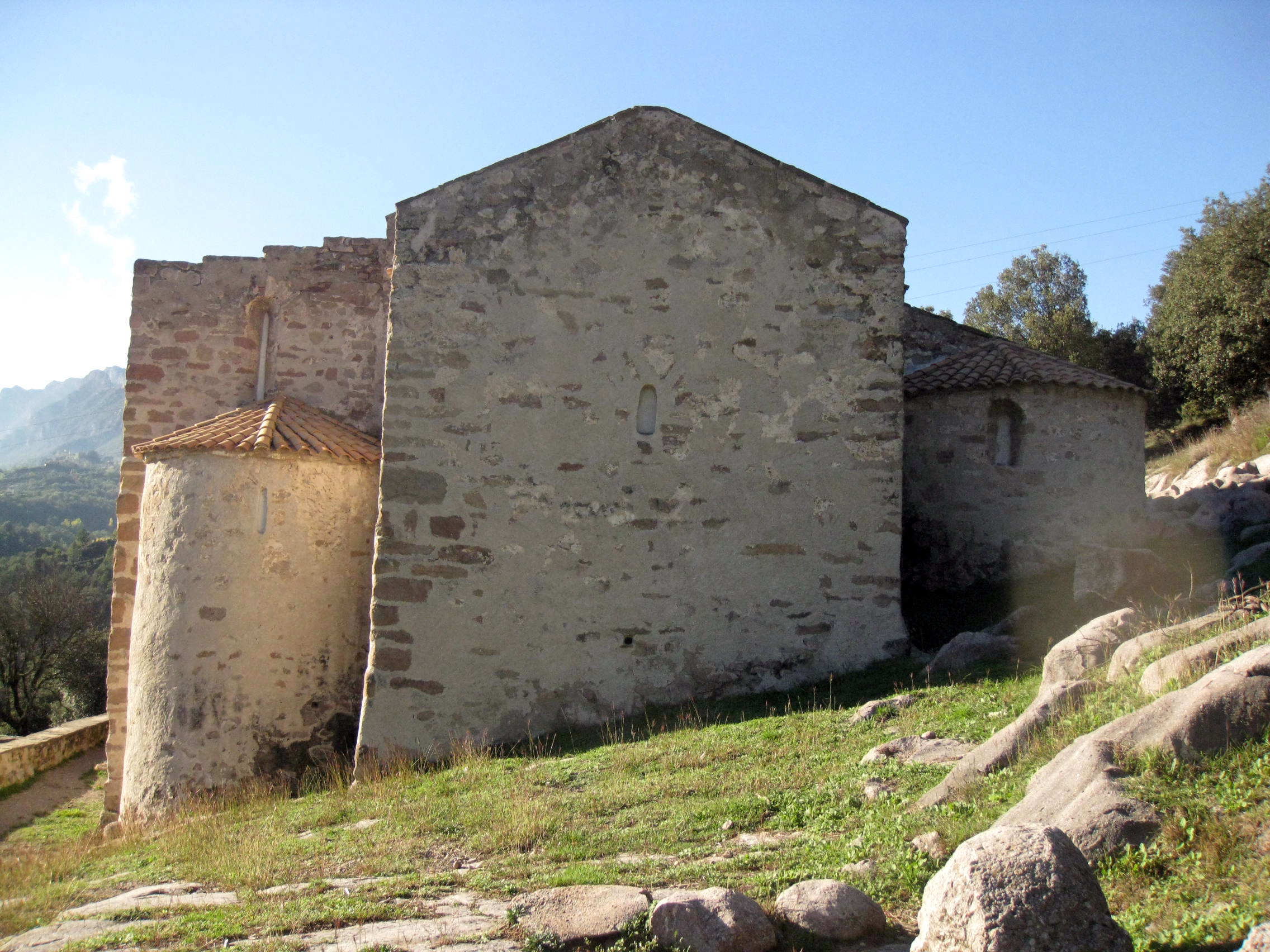
View of the church and the two side apses from the east

== See also ==
- Spanish Romanesque

== Bibliography ==
- Carbonell, Eduard; Pagès, Montserrat; Camps, Jordi; Marot, Teresa (1998). Romanesque Art Guide: Museu Nacional D'Art de Catalunya. Museu Nacional d'Art de Catalunya. ISBN 978-84-8043-039-5.
- Castiñeiras, Manuel A.; Camps i Sòria, Jordi; Duran-Porta, Joan (2008). Romanesque art in the MNAC collections. Barcelona: Museu Nacional d'Art de Catalunya : Lunwerg. ISBN 978-84-9785-548-8.
- Cayuela Vellido, Begoña; Guardia, Milagros (1 January 2014). "La iglesia de Sant Quirze de Pedret". Enciclopedia del Románico en España. Barcelona. Aguilar de Campoo, 2014, vol. I.
- Cayuela Vellido, Begoña (4 October 2022). Sant Quirze de Pedret, un paisatge pictòric romànic (in Catalan). Edicions Universitat Barcelona. ISBN 978-84-9168-816-7.
- González, Antoni; Lacuesta, Raquel; Carrasco, M. Antónia (1996). The restoration of the church of Sant Quirze de Pedret. Barcelona: Diputació de Barcelona.
- Klein, Peter K. (1993). "The Romanesque in Catalonia". The Art of Medieval Spain, A.D. 500–1200. Metropolitan Museum of Art. ISBN 978-0-8109-6433-4.
- Munoz-Pandiella, Imanol; Argudo, Oscar; Lorés Otzet, Immaculada; Font Comas, Joan; Casademont, Genís Àvila; Pueyo, Xavier; Andujar, Carlos (2022). "Digital Reintegration of Distributed Mural Paintings at Different Architectural Phases: the Case of St. Quirze de Pedret". Eurographics Workshop on Graphics and Cultural Heritage: 67–76. doi:10.2312/gch.20221227.
- Ylla-Català, Gemma (2016). "Romanesque Art and Modernity. Raimon Casellas, Josep Pijoan and the Aesthetic Value of Romanesque Painting". In Lahuerta, Juan José; Philippot, Emilia (eds.). Picasso and Romanesque Art. Museu Nacional d'Art de Catalunya, with the collaboration of Tenov Books. ISBN 978-84-8043-287-0.
