= Santa Maria, Àneu =

Monastery in La Guingueta, Spain

Coordinates: 42°36′55.37″N 1°7′45.13″E

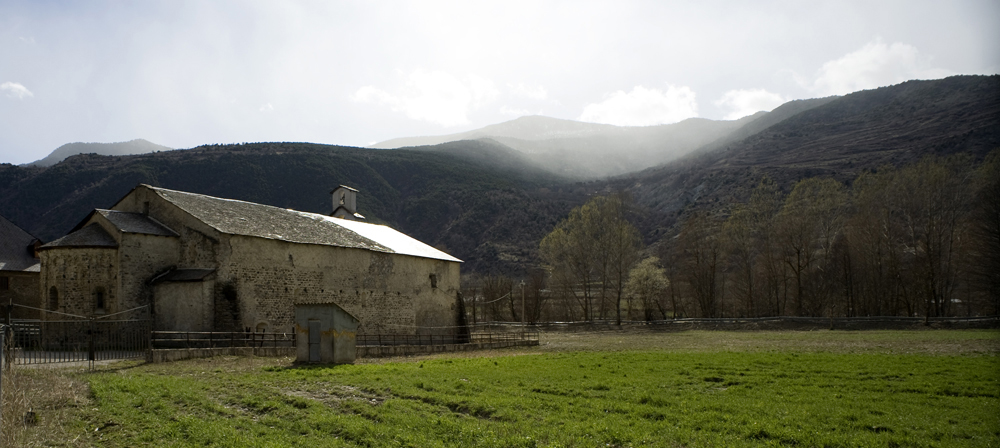
Santa Maria d'Àneu

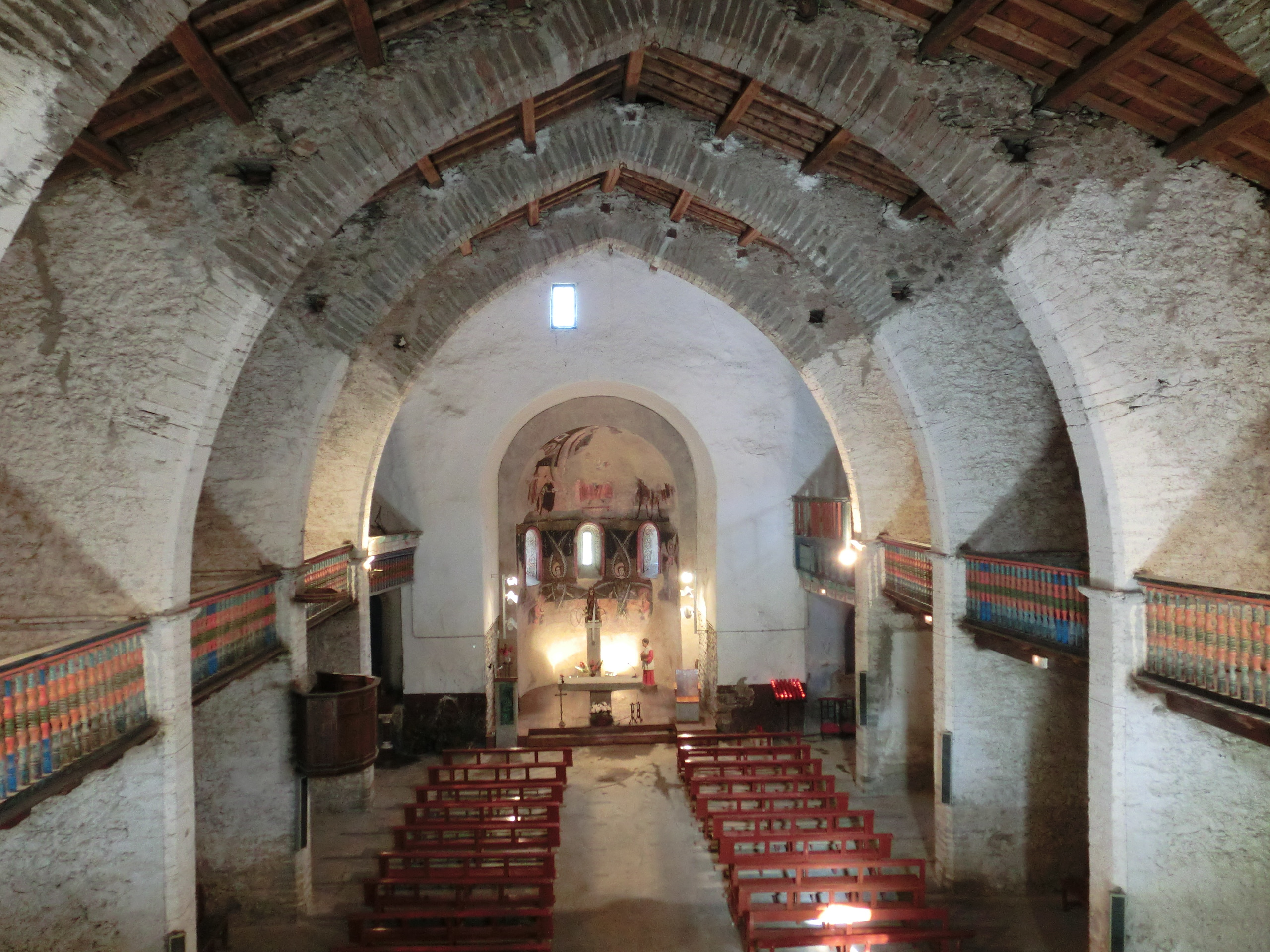
Interior view

Santa Maria d'Àneu is a Benedictine monastery in La Guingueta d'Àneu, Pallars Sobirà, Catalonia, Spain. It is known for its apse, originally painted at the church and later transferred to the Museu Nacional d'Art de Catalunya. The Romanesque monastery was documented in the year 839 in the records associated with the consecration of the Cathedral of Santa Maria d'Urgell. It is believed that it was originally a Visigoth monastery dedicated to St. Deodata. Until the late 10th century, it was dedicated to St. Peter. In the 11th century, it became a Benedictine monastery but in 1216, it was transferred to the Augustinians. By 1723, after a gradual decline, it had only one prior and a lay brother. Becoming part of the deanery of Anheu, it served as a pilgrimage center for the entire region. During the Spanish Civil War in 1936, it was burned and later replaced by a replica. The sanctuary is dedicated to the Mare d'Àneu.

== Architecture and fittings ==
Construction occurred in the first half of the 11th century. It consists of three naves with a central apse center and two side apses with cross vaults. It has a small bell tower with belfry. The facade was completely renovated in the 20th century. Highlights include the murals that decorated parts of the sanctuary, dedicated to the Epiphany and the Adoration of the Magi. The polychrome paintings are attributed to Master of Pedret, but may be later. The paintings can be seen at the Museu Nacional d'Art de Catalunya.
