= Sponsus =

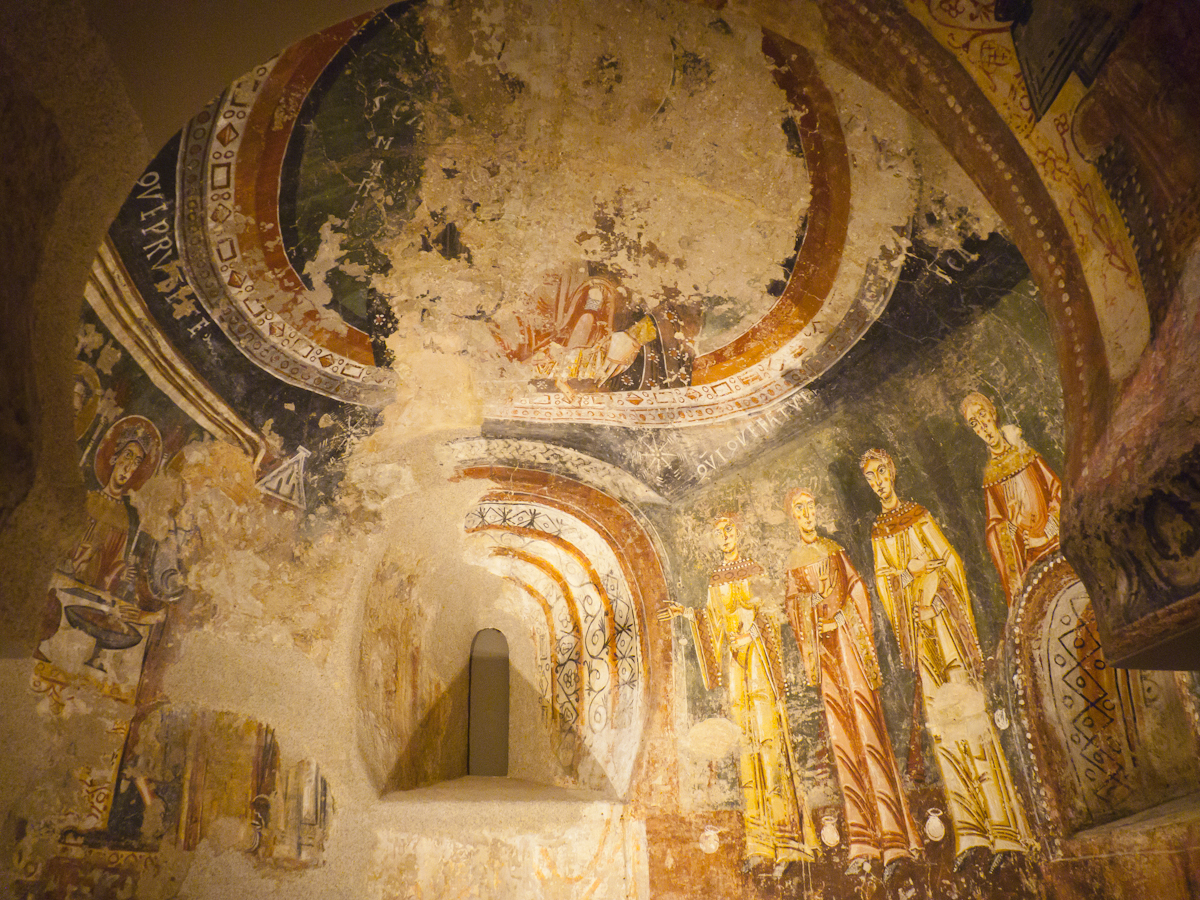
Depiction of the parable of the ten virgins in Sant Quirze de Pedret, which has been linked to the Sponsus play.

Sponsus or The Bridegroom is a medieval Latin and Occitan dramatic treatment of Jesus' parable of the ten virgins. A liturgical play designed for Easter Vigil, it was composed probably in Gascony or western Languedoc in the mid-eleventh century. Its scriptural basis is found in the Gospel of Matthew (25:1–13), but it also draws on the Song of Songs and the Patristics, perhaps Jerome's Adversus Jovinianum. In certain respects—the portrayal of the merchants, the spilling of the oil, the implicit questioning of accepted theodicy—it is original and dramatically powerful.

"Sponsus" is the Latin word for groom/husband and is the source of the English word "spouse". The feminine form is "sponsa" (bride/wife).

== Story ==
The play opens with an unnamed narrative voice explaining the allegory of the parable, the identity of the bridegroom with Jesus, and the Gospel. This unnamed voice has been identified with both Gabriel and the Church (Ecclesia) personified. The next speaker of the play, who uses Occitan, is probably Gabriel, though this rubric is fragmentary and identifies only those whom he addresses: the prudentes, prudent ones. The angel tells the five wise virgins—the five foolish ones have presumably fallen asleep after Ecclesia's more general caution—to attend a groom, Jesus Christ, who came to save them from their sins. He gives them the ominous warning Gaire no.i / dormet: "Don't fall asleep!", which is repeated several times.

After Gabriel's message, the foolish virgins (recognised from the rubric fatue) enter and announce that they have spilled the oil for their lamps. The spilling of the oil was probably acted out for dramatic effect, though the bible knows nothing of it. The foolish then plead with the wise to share their oil, capping each strophe with the lamenting refrain Dolentas, chaitivas, trop i avem dormit: "We, wretched in our grief, have slept too long!" The wise virgins turn them away without pity, inviting them to buy oil from the merchants nearby. The foolish (who now seem wise) only blame themselves, but the merchants, who are presented sympathetically, tell them that they cannot help them and advise them to beseech their sisters in God's name. The merchants' eight lines, which are significant to the dramatic movement, are given in Occitan without any comparable Latin. The dramatist builds tension between the foolish, who are repentant, the wise, who are condescending, and the merchants, who are sympathetic to the foolish and trusting of the charity of the wise. The text's English translator, Peter Dronke, praises the dramatist's clever portrayal and insights into human nature.

The foolish do not follow the merchants' advice, having been twice rebuffed by their wise sisters. The drama ends when modo veniat sponsus: "Now let the bridegroom arrive." Christus arrives as bridegroom and promptly dismisses the foolish virgins' pleas, sending them away. They are then taken by demons to Hell: the earliest attested appearance of demons in western drama. Christ's lines are sung to the same melody as Ecclesia's and the drama closes where it has begun, with the foretold penalty for negligence being meted out by the agents of Hell. It is possible that the play was acted above the stairwell that led to the crypt and that a brazier may have sufficed as an inferno for the maidens to be led into by grotesque demons. There is a possible serio-comic combination of gravity and levity in the final scenes of the play. On the other hand, Davidson suggests that the demons must have been portrayed in grim seriousness as personifications of real human fears.

== Language and style ==
Sponsus is one of the earliest fully dramatic accounts of the parable of the virgins. The pitiless treatment of the foolish virgins, who are portrayed sympathetically, was probably designed to question the official interpretation of the Scriptures. A later medieval German play on the same theme and style, the Ludus de decem virginibus (the Eisenacher Zehnjungfrauenspiele), so disturbed the landgrave of Thuringia, Frederick I, and caused him to doubt God's mercy, that he took to his bed ill on 4 May 1321.

The manuscript in which Sponsus is preserved is in the Bibliothèque nationale de France, Latin 1139, the Saint-Martial codex, folios 53r–55v. It was copied in the late eleventh century in or around Limoges, since the Occitan appears to be the Limousin dialect, though originally it may have been another dialect. It was probably composed in the 1050s or 1060s.

Scholarship is divided over whether the Latin and Occitan parts of Sponsus were written at the same time (Peter Dronke) or whether the Occitan parts are later additions (D'Arco Silvio Avalle). The latter school of thought regards them as explanations (gloss or farcitures) of the Latin. Regardless, the vernacular Occitan portions were probably intended for the unlearned audience, who would not be familiar with Latin, as the clerical audience would. Dronke believes the dramatist to be more powerful in his native tongue, and it is in that language that Christ delivers the final lines of the play.

== Melody and poetry ==
The music of Sponsus has been praised by Rafaello Monteross for "redeem[ing] the anonymous poet's colourless paraphrase of the gospel text from its generic inexpressiveness." The melodic phrasing is varied, but only four different melodies are used for the entire play, though none of them is liturgical, and none form motifs. The entire score is original and is recorded in Aquitainian neumes.

The strophic structure of the play is consistent throughout. The two principal metres are fifteen-syllable lines (for the Latin), with antecedents in classical trochaic septenarii, and ten-syllable lines (used for both Latin and Occitan), with predecessors in late antique and Merovingian hymns. The late antique hymn Apparebit repentina dies magna domini may have been an inspiration.

The combination of original music, unique theme, and implicit questioning of traditional theodicies have led to the suggestion that the play may stand at the very beginning of non-liturgical and vernacular drama in Europe.

== Sources ==
- Davidson, Clifford. "On the Uses of Iconographic Study: The Example of the Sponsus From St. Martial of Limoges." Comparative Drama, 13:4 (1979/1980:Winter), pp. 300–319.
- Dronke, Peter, ed. and trans. (1994). Nine Medieval Latin Plays. Cambridge Medieval Classics I. Cambridge: Cambridge University Press. ISBN 0-521-39537-2.
- Hiley, David (1993). Western Plainchant: A Handbook. Oxford: Oxford University Press. ISBN 0-19-816572-2.
