= Apostles from Àger =

Painting

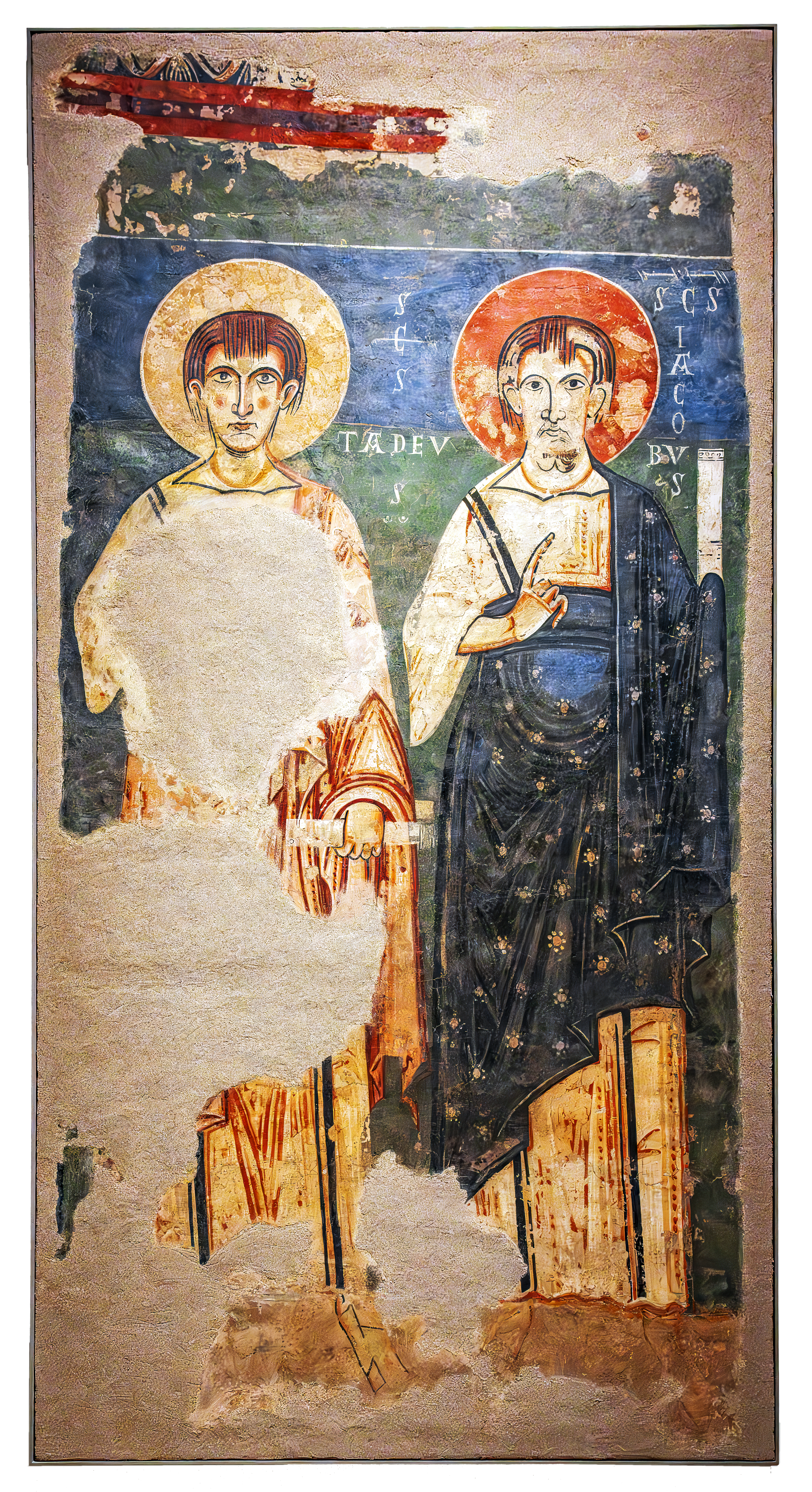
- Artist: Cercle of Pedret
- Year: c. 1100
- Dimensions: 280 cm × 144 cm (110 in × 57 in)
- Location: Museu Nacional d'Art de Catalunya; Barcelona

The Apostles from Àger is a painting created in the late 11th century or early 12th century, currently exhibited at the National Art Museum of Catalonia in Barcelona.

== Description ==
The church of Sant Pere in Àger, founded by Arnau Mir of Tost, who conquered the valley of Àger from the Saracens, was the see of a regular canonry exempt from ordinary jurisdictions (in other words, it did not depend on the Bishop of Urgell), with enormous estates from the donations by the founder and his descendants. In keeping with its importance, the church, now in ruins, was very monumental.

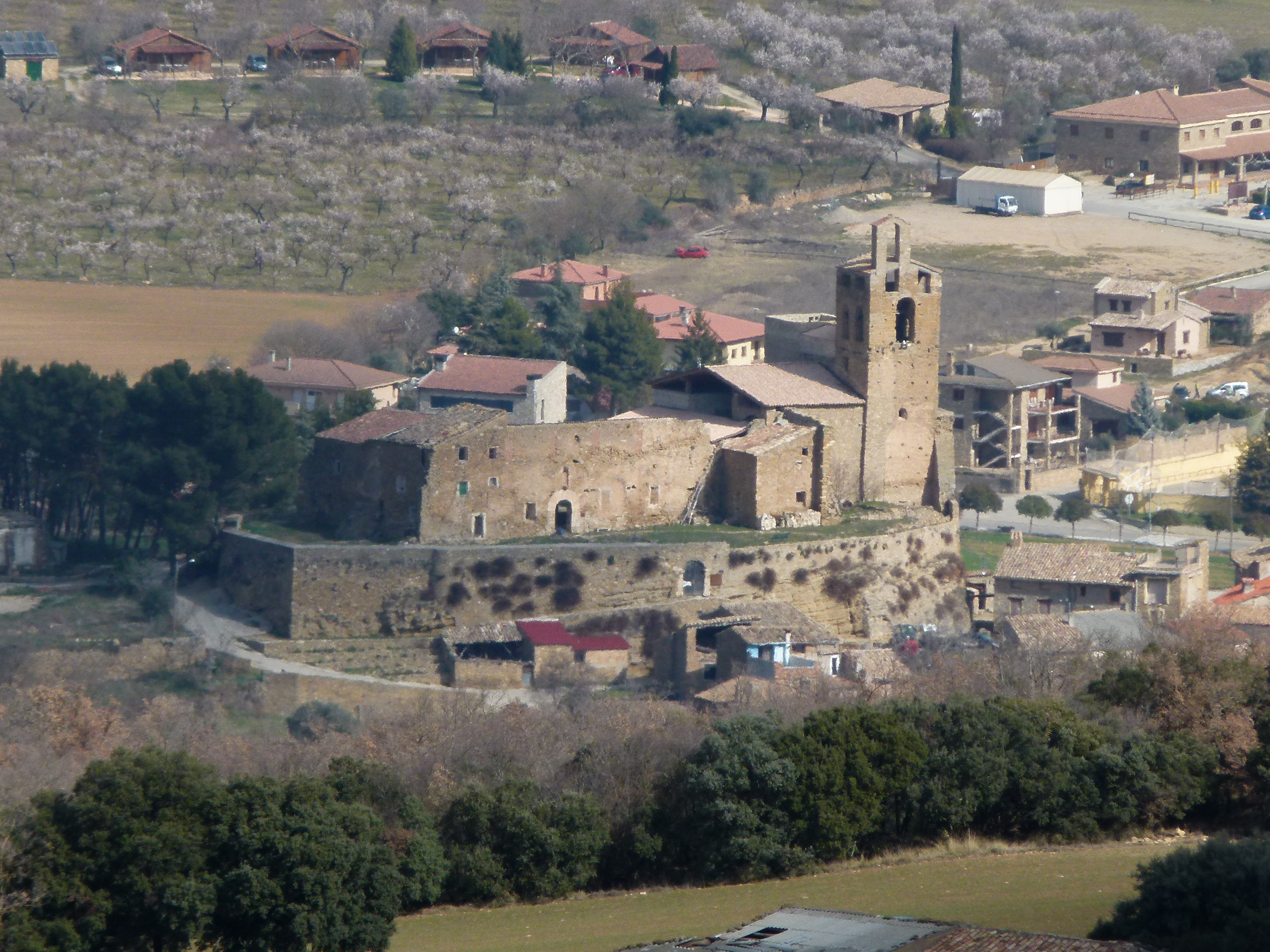
Ager - Castell i colegiata de Sant Pere

Of the paintings that once decorated it, only scattered fragments remain of the main and southern apses, of which the most outstanding and complete is that of the two apostles, Thaddeus and James, from the first arcosolium in the central apse. The two monumental apostles of Àger are presented in a face-on, hieratic position, with scrolls or volumes in their hands, which they are holding in alternating positions, at the same time as the colour of their nimbuses and their clothing also differs. The beardless one on the left is Thaddeus and the one on the right, with a beard, is James, as the inscriptions indicate. The pictorial style belongs to the Lombardic influenced Pedret Cercle and shows a close relationship with that in the paintings in the cathedral of Saint-Lizier in Couserans (in situ, France).

As in Saint-Lizier, in each of the niches in the apse of Sant Pere in Àger there must have been a pair of apostles. All together they must have made up the Apostolic College, whose representation was fully meaningful in Augustinian chapter houses like that of Àger, who, in keeping with the Gregorian reform, wanted to strengthen the independence of the Church as an institution in the face of secular power.
