= Sant Pere del Burgal =

Monastery in La Guingueta, Spain

Coordinates: 42°32′49″N 1°10′6″E

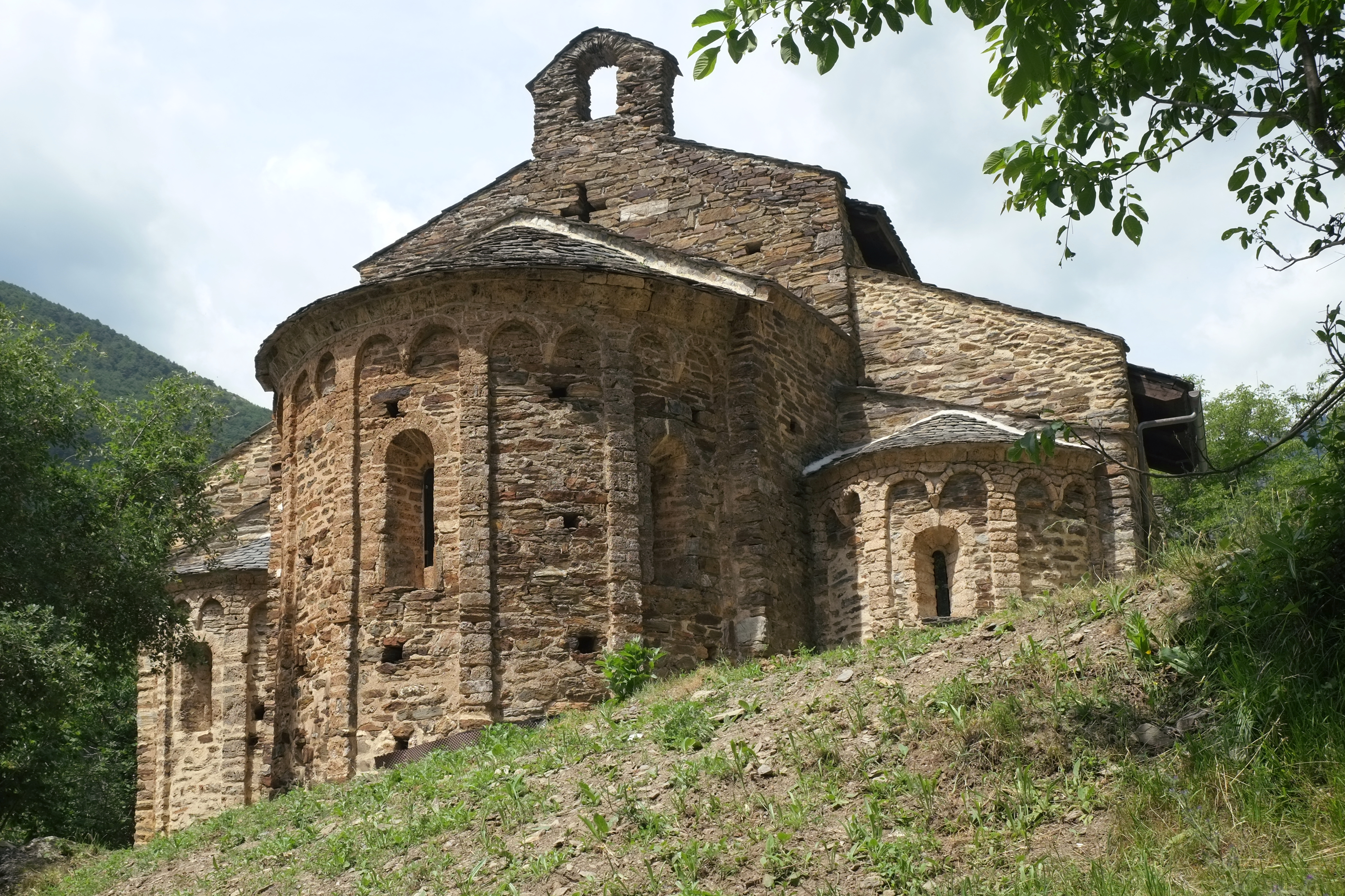
Exterior of apse

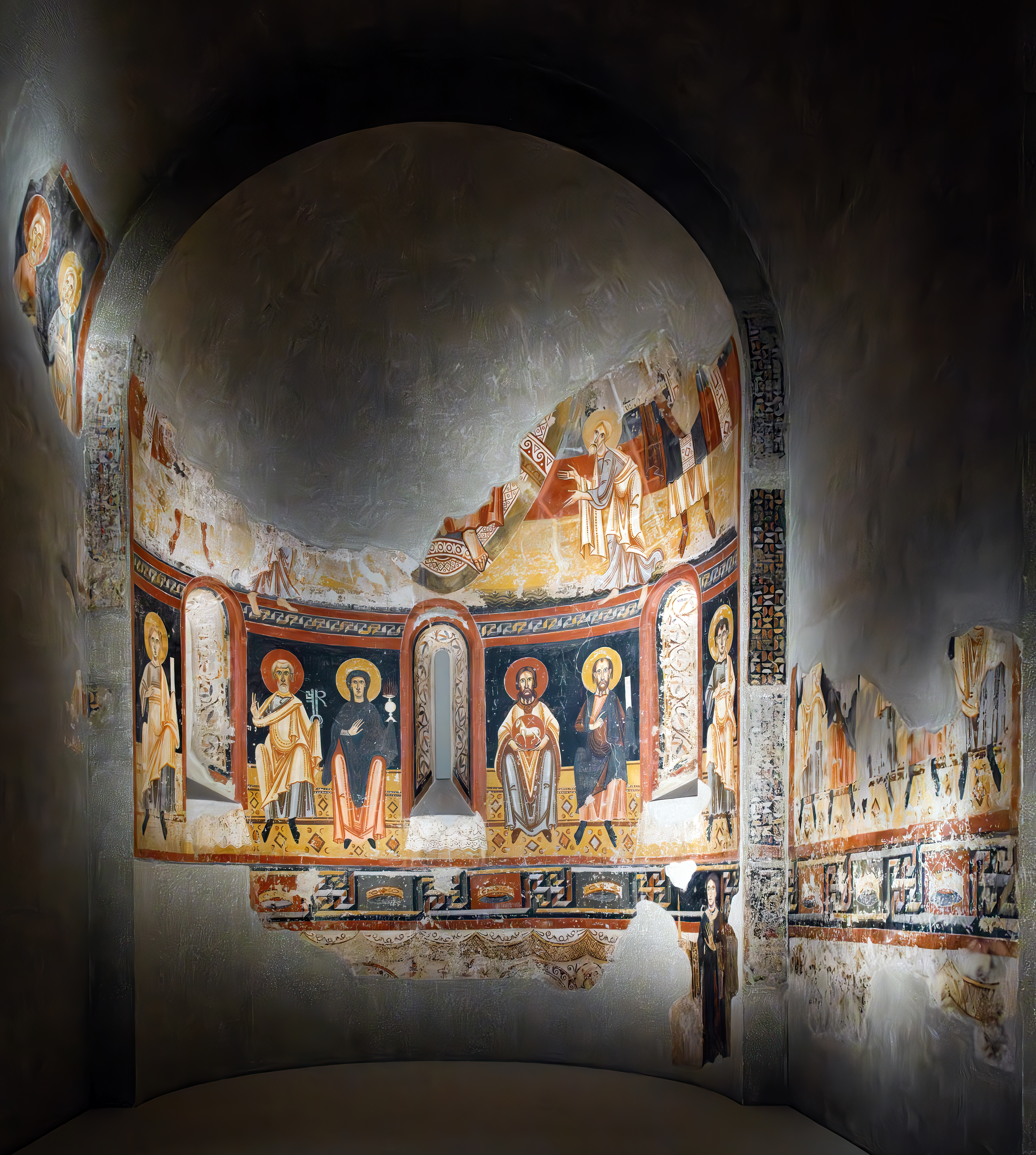
Frescoes

Sant Pere del Burgal is a Romanesque Benedictine monastery in Escaló, in the municipality of La Guingueta d'Àneu, Pallars Sobirà, Catalonia, Spain. The monastery was first mentioned in a precept of Count Raymond I of Toulouse in 859. It later became a priory of the abbey of Roussillon. It fell into decline and was secularized in 1570 and confiscated in 1835. It contains frescoes dated to the 11th century.
