= Apse of Santa Maria, Àneu =

11th – 12th century painting

Apse of Santa María, Àneu
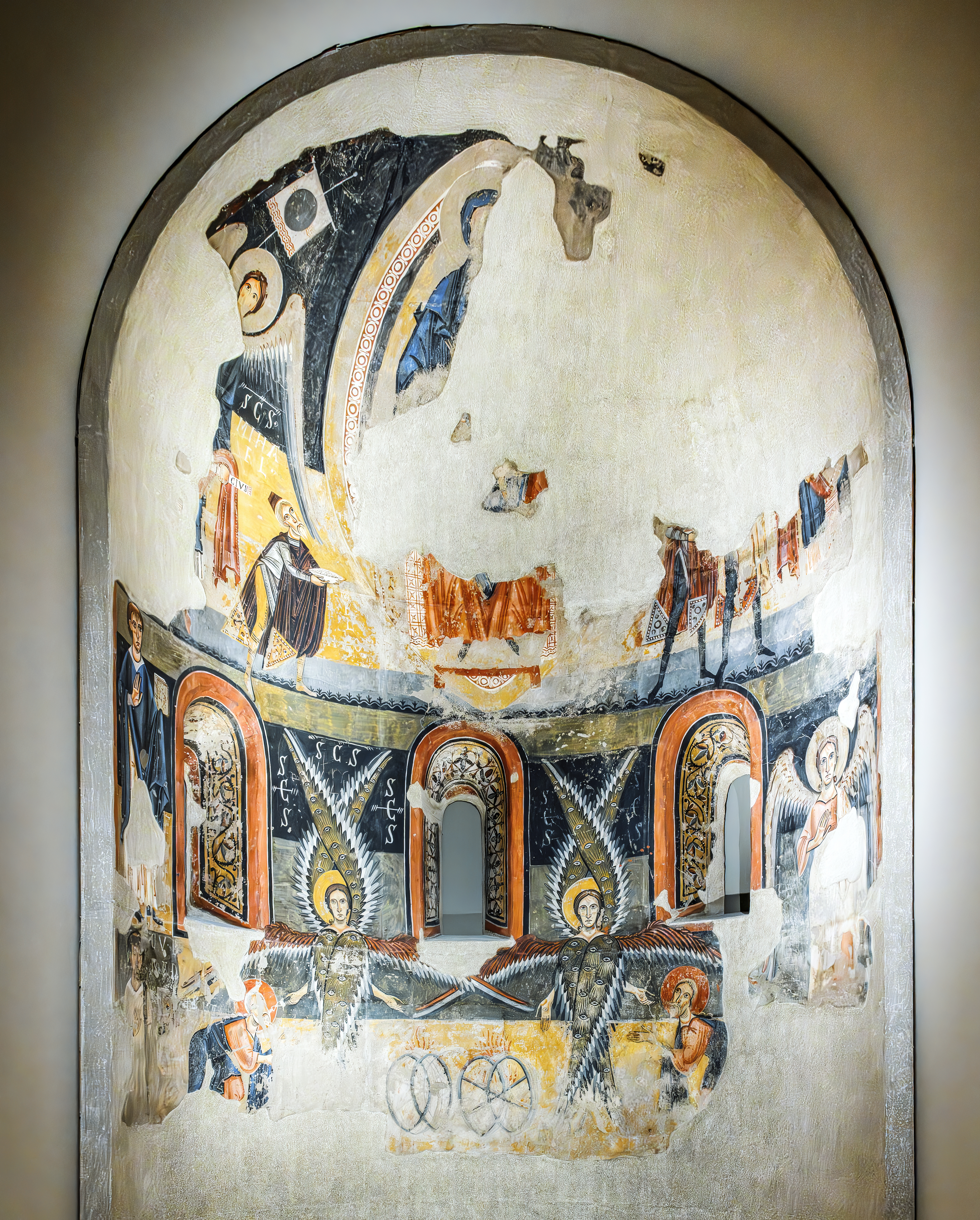
- Artist: Circle of the Master of Pedret
- Year: Late 11th century - early 12th century
- Type: Fresco transferred to canvas
- Dimensions: 700 cm × 410 cm (280 in × 160 in)
- Location: Museu Nacional d'Art de Catalunya; Barcelona

The Apse of Santa María d'Àneu is a romanesque apse of the church of Santa Maria, Àneu, created in the late 11th century or early 12th century, the transferred frescos from which are now exhibited at Museu Nacional d'Art de Catalunya, in Barcelona. The decoration of the apse of the church of Santa María d’Àneu combines themes and motifs from the Old and New Testaments. Originally painted at the Church of Santa María d’Àneu (La Guingueta d’Àneu, Lleida)

== History ==
The church of Santa María d'Àneu is located in the upper valley of the Noguera Pallaresa, Pyrenees mountain region. The building once belonged to a Benedictine Monastery, it is divided into a nave and aisles by six pairs of piers, taking the shape of a cross. The east end concludes in three semicircular apses, the central apse was decorated with frescoes.

Santa Maria in Àneu was the most important church in the Àneu Valley and belonged to the cathedral chapter of Urgell. From the stylistic circle of Pedret, of Lombardic influence, the decoration of the apse reveals the existence of an elaborate iconographic and theological programme setting off the prophetic hopes of the Old Testament—that is, hope in the coming of a Messiah who was to redeem humanity—against fulfillment of the prophecies—that is, the coming of the Messiah announced by the prophets. Museu Nacional d'Art de Catalunya dates the original work at the end of 11th century – beginning of 12th century. However, there is speculation that the paintings were completed at the beginning of the 13th century at the time when Romanesque styles were breaking down and Gothic Art was coming of age.

== Description ==
The iconography of the painting is suggestive of the Old Testament through the presence of the prophets in reverential attitudes. In the vault portion of the apse, the Epiphany or Adoration of the Magi is represented, with Mary, Jesus, and the three eastern kings baring gifts. Wheels of fire from Jehovah’s chariot are depicted in the lower register, conforming to Ezekiel’s vision. To the right and left are the archangels Michael and Gabriel holding banners and scrolls with the inscription PETICIVS and POSTVLATIVS. Bordering the central window of the lower zones are two six-winged seraphim, in their hands they hold live coals with tongs which they place in the mouths of two crouching figures. In the left lower zone, there are two tonsured (meaning scalp has been shaved) figures who might be Saints Benedict and Bernard or one of them might be a portrait of a local deacon on account of the realism in the face of the figure. The theory that these figures are patrons of the church is strengthened by the discovery of similar figures in related frescoes at the monastery of Saint Peter of Berga. The third archangel, Raphael, does not appear with the others in the semidome but in the lower section.

At the bottom is the announcement, the biblical prophecy, represented by means of combined images of the visions of Isaiah and Ezequiel. In keeping with the first, two magnificent seraphim with three pairs of wings each purify the mouth of the prophets with glowing embers which they are holding with tongs. Next to them are the prophets, represented with their hands together in an attitude of reverence.

At the same time, the seraphim intone the Trisagion, or song of praise to the Lord, represented by the letters SCS, SCS, SCS, which mean ‘holy, holy, holy’. From this moment, the word of the prophets will be the word of God. Beneath the central window are the wheels of fire of Yahweh’s chariot, described in Ezequiel’s vision, which symbolise the presence of the Lord. On the vault was the Virgin and Child, representing the accomplishment of the prophecies, in the scene from Epiphany, with two archangels, Michael and Gabriel, patrons of sinners, in a representation very similar to that in the apse from Santa Maria in Cap d'Aran (The Cloisters, New York). A third archangel, Raphael, is represented on the right of the semicylinder, perhaps as the introducer of the two donor clergymen who appear on the left of the apse.

== Composition ==
The frescoes are attributed to the Circle of the Master of Pedret. The Master of Pedret was the first significant painter of the Catalon Romanesque period and is named for the wall paintings at the church of Sant Quirze de Pedret in Berga. The Apse at Aneu represents the end of a tradition, during this time the painter might have felt himself at liberty to relax old rules and abandon strict division into zones, therefore filling the bottom section not with lines of Apostles, but with less rigid elements of the prophetic vision.

== Analysis ==
The Àneu frescos make a complete break with the normal Catalan artistic scheme. The lower zone is unique and unrelated to the upper portion of the apse. The Byzantine influence appears to be strong in the style of the frescos, the seraphim have been noted to resemble those in the crypt at the cathedral of Anagni, near Rome. In addition there are touches of pure realism, this is seen in the details such as the unshaven face of the figure at the left of the lower register and the thin and deeply wrinkled face of Magus. The painting could represent direct borrowings from Byzantium or importations from Byzantine Art via Lombardy, Italy. This influence is shown in the costume of the Wise Men (or Maji) which is representative of the eastern court. Other features linking the artwork to Italy are the decorative border, simulated drapery (they have waves and circular medallions), and the geometrical border is similar to the one in the Roman church of San Carlo in Prugiasco (Switzerland).

== Additional photos ==
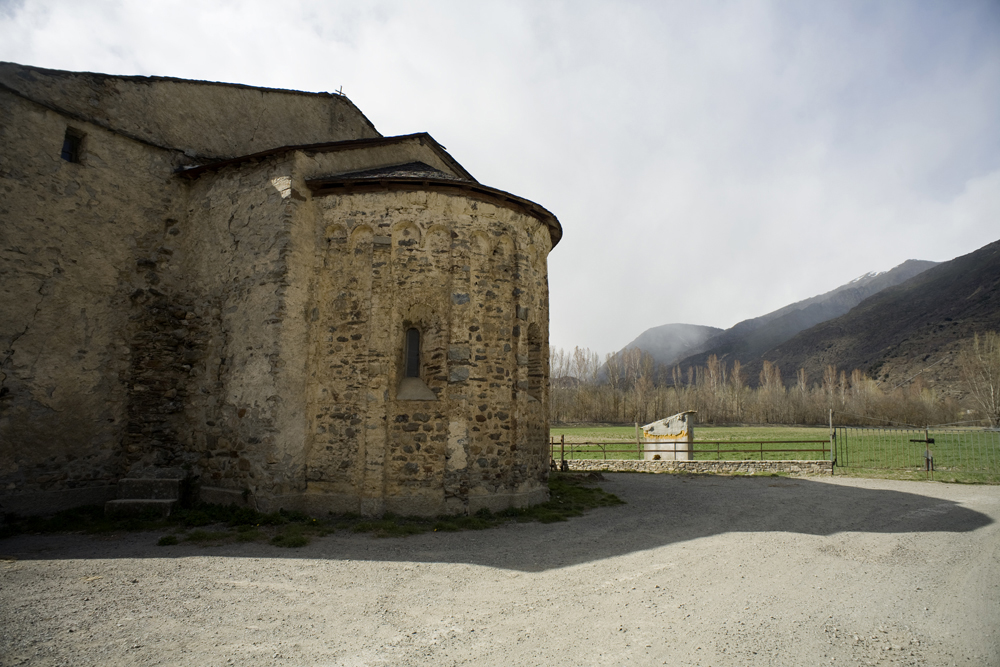
Church of Santa Maria d'Àneu

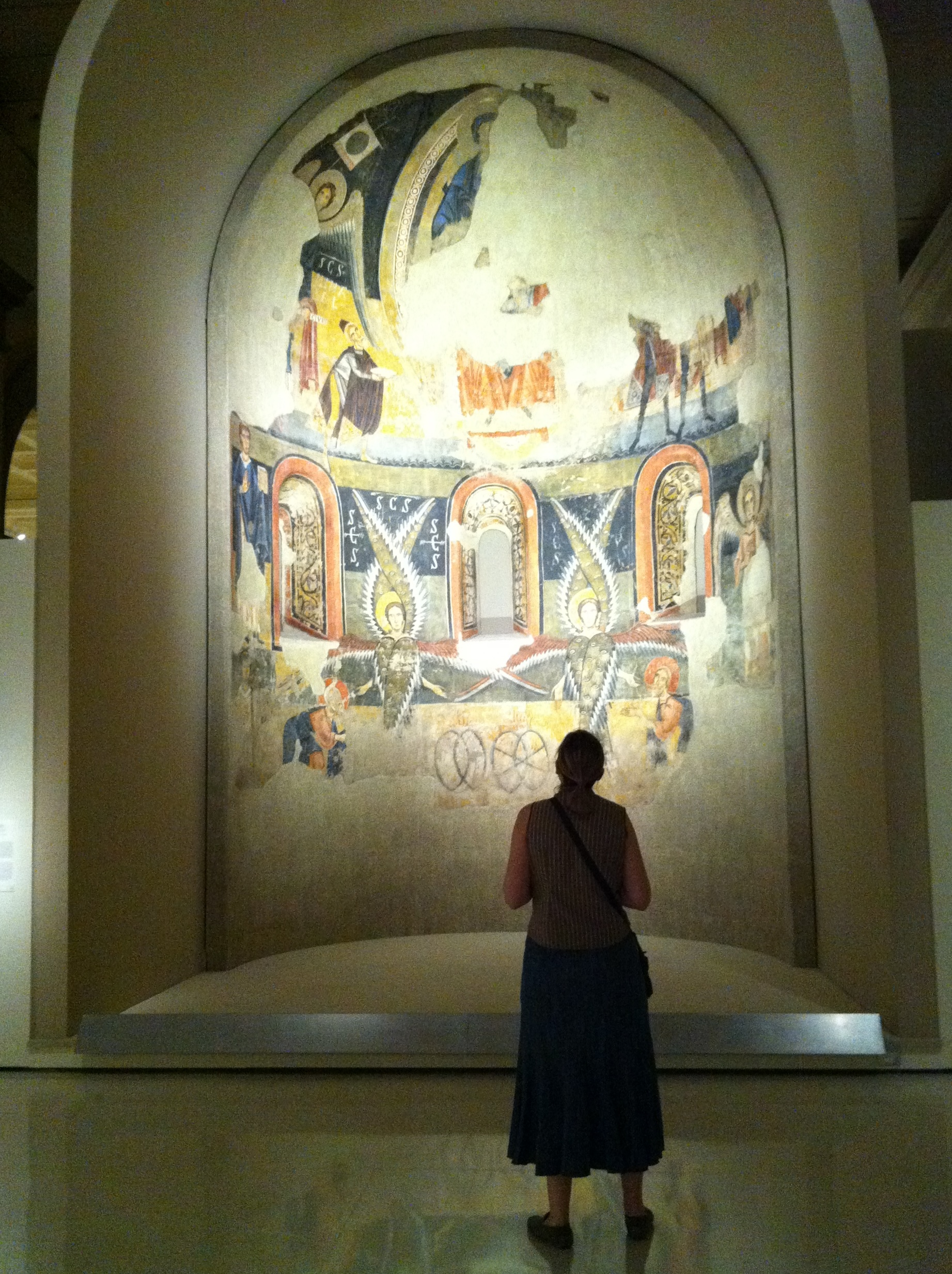
On exhibit at the National Art Museum of Catalonia
