= Pedret =

Pedret is a Spanish surname. Notable people with the surname include:

- Ferran Pedret (born 1979), Spanish lawyer, politician, and writer
- Jesús Pedret (1905–1933), Spanish footballer
- Jordi Pedret (born 1950), Catalan lawyer and politician
- Tomás Padró Pedret (1840–1877), Catalan painter, graphic artist, and illustrator

== See also ==
- Pedret i Marzà, a municipality in the comarca of Alt Empordà, Girona, Catalonia
