= Paintings from El Burgal =

Group of paintings

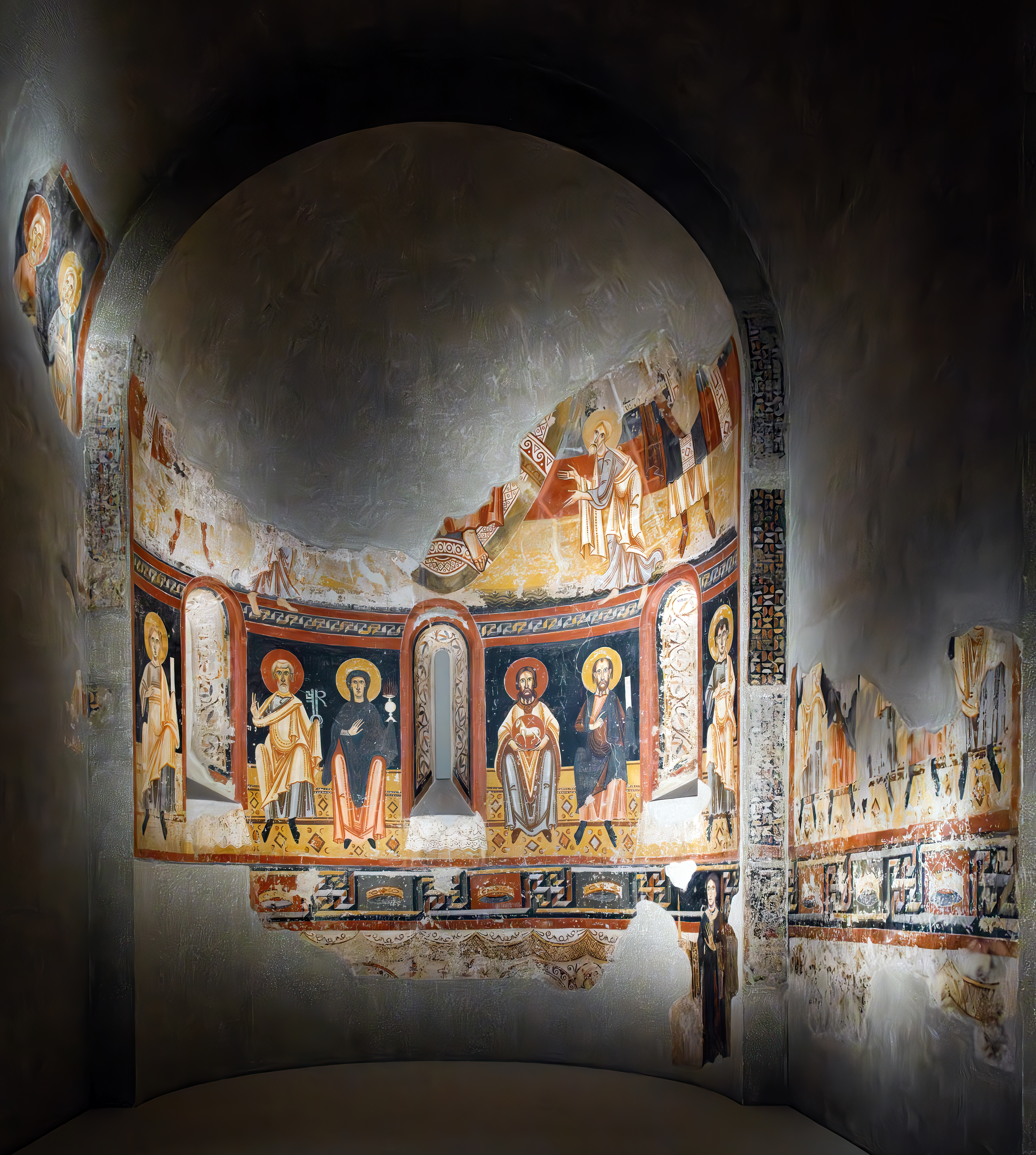
- Artist: Cercle de Pedret
- Year: End of the eleventh century
- Location: Museu Nacional d'Art de Catalunya; Barcelona

The Paintings from El Burgal is group of paintings exhibited at the National Art Museum of Catalonia in Barcelona.

== Description ==
The very noteworthy style of the paintings from the Burgal apse is linked to the Pedret Circle, of Lombardic influence. The programme of images, with its marked Eucharistic and ecclesiological sense (referring to the Eucharist and the Church), contained a Theophany or vision of the divinity on the vault, which was presided by the figure of the Maiestas Domini or Christ in Majesty, which to judge from the surviving remains must have been monumental. It was flanked by the figures of two prophets in a reverent attitude of beseeching and by two archangels carrying signs with inscriptions on which they advocated for sinners. These have been partly preserved. In the lower register is a representation of the Church militant, with imposing, grim-looking apostles and saints sitting in a semicircle and centred by the figures of Mary, with the chalice, and John the Baptist, with the Lamb, the symbol of the death and resurrection of Christ, of great Eucharistic significance.

Beside them are Peter, with the keys, Paul, with a scroll and a volume, and John the Evangelist, on the right, plus another apostle on the left. An attractive Greek fret separates this area from the painted drapery there was at the bottom of the apse. What especially distinguishes this apse is the figure of the richly dressed female donor holding a lighted candle. She appears superimposed on the drapery, as though approaching the holy images. She is wearing a luxurious dress decorated with precious stones and from the remains of an inscription can be identified as the Countess Llúcia, wife of Artau I of Pallars Sobirà. The paintings probably date from the time of their children Artau II and Ot, who was soon to be bishop of Urgell. In the church, in situ, close to the apse, is the portrait of other characters, presumably also members of the count’s family.
