= Master of Pedret =

12th century Catalonian fresco painter

Master of Pedret is the name given by historians to a Romanesque fresco painter active in Catalonia in the early twelfth century. The name comes from one of his most representative works, the right side of the apse of the church of Sant Quirze de Pedret, now moved to the Museu Nacional d’Art de Catalunya, Barcelona, Spain.

== Some paintings ==
- Southern apse from Pedret - National Art Museum of Catalonia, Barcelona
- Central apse of St. Quirze Pedret-Diocesan and Regional Museum of Solsona Solsona
- Apse of Santa María d'Àneu (fragment) - Pedret Circle - National Art Museum of Catalonia
- Paintings of Cape Santa Maria Aran, The Cloisters, New York.
- Apse of Santa Eulalia Estaon and Surp-Circle-distant Pedret National Art Museum of Catalonia
- Crucifixion in the church of Santa Eulalia-Estaon Diocesan Museum of La Seu d'Urgell [8]
- Apostles from Àger

== Gallery ==
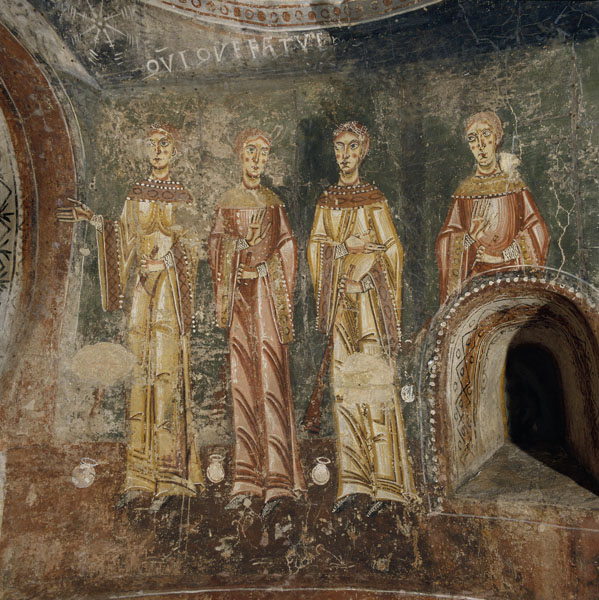
Southern apse from Pedret

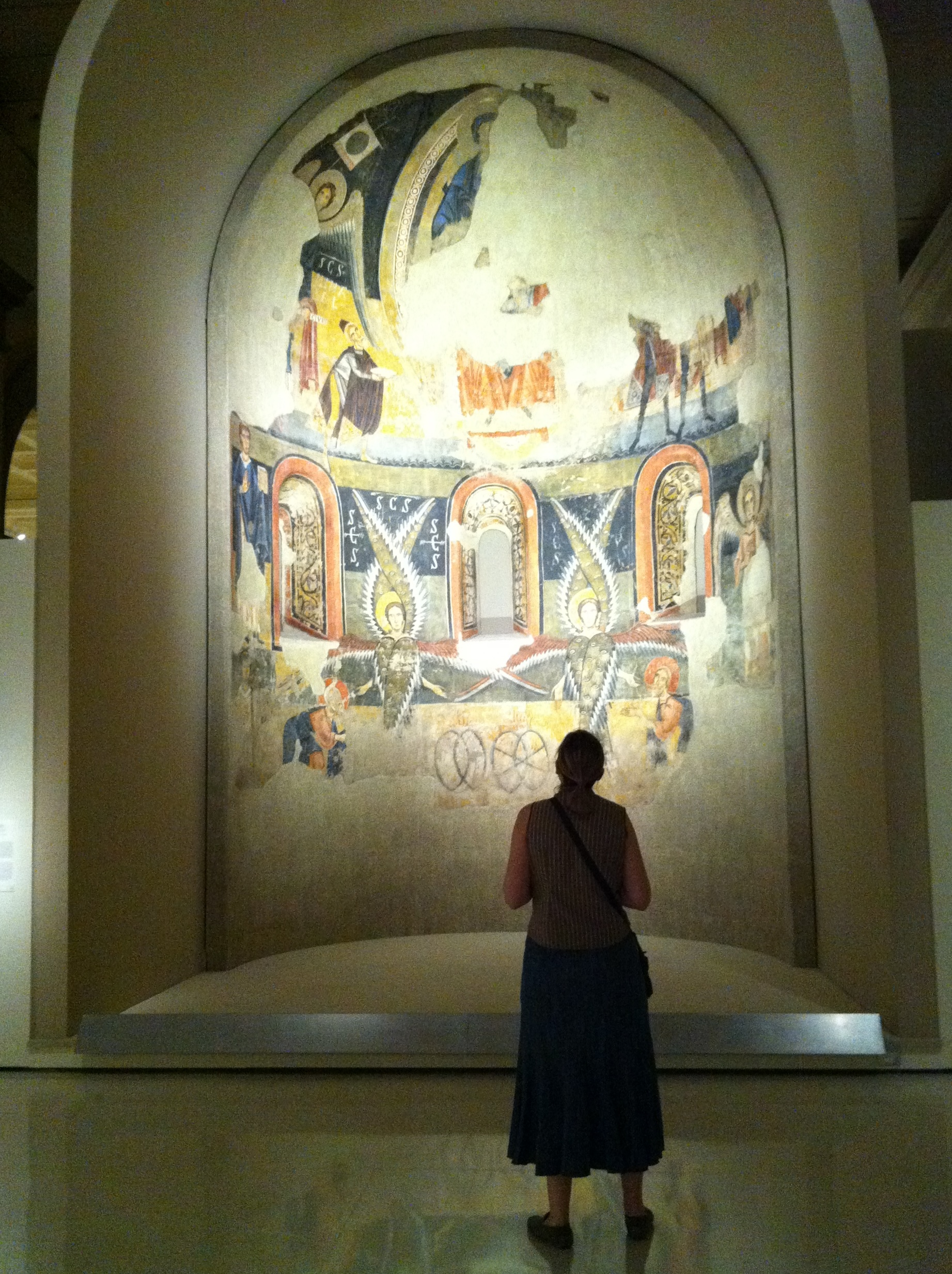
Apse of Santa María d'Àneu

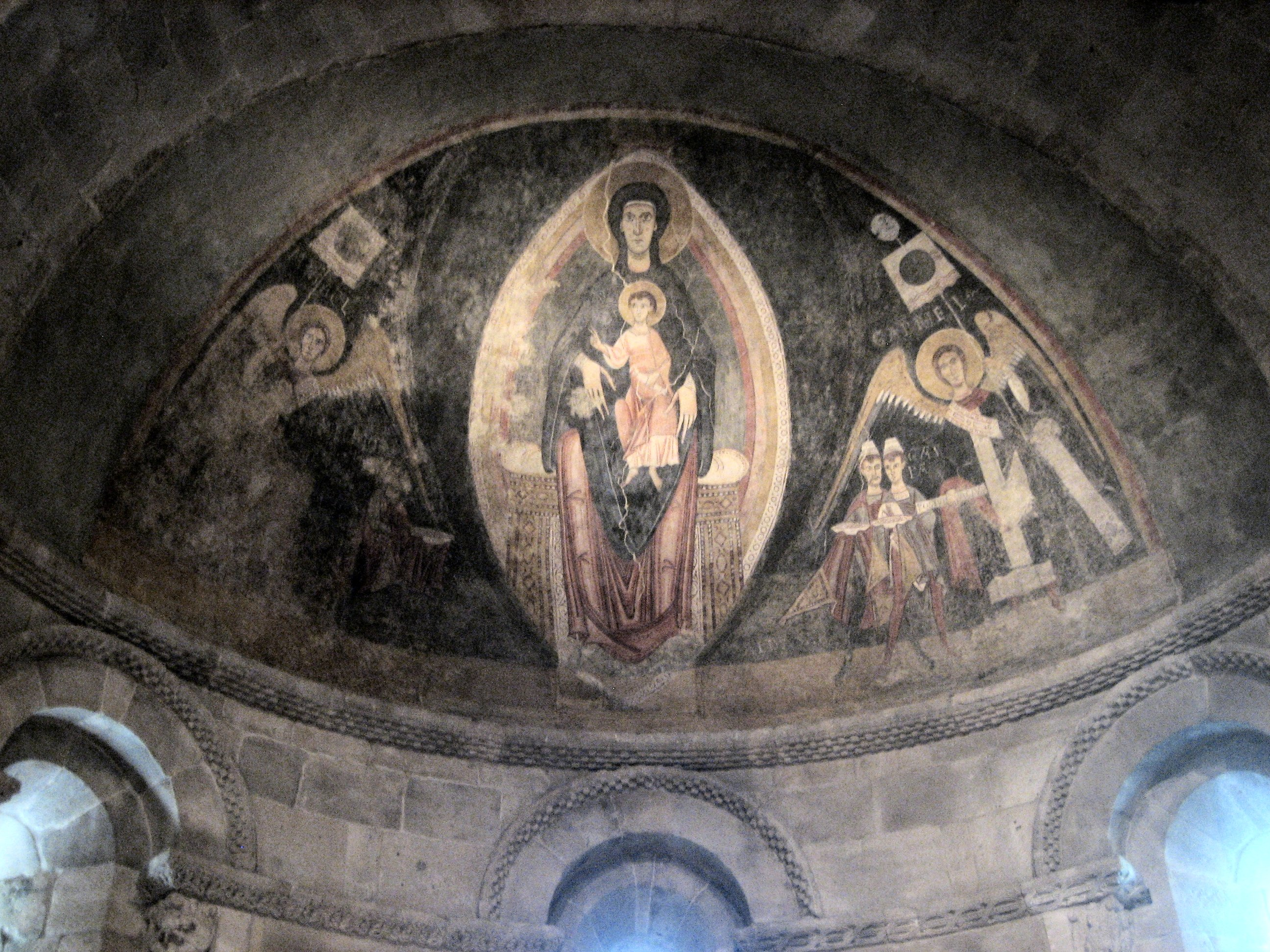
The Virgin and Child in Majesty and the Adoration of the Magi, apse fresco, Spain, c. 1100, now The Cloisters.
