= Bresca =

Bresca may refer to:

- Bresca (restaurant), Washington, D.C., United States
- Bresca (Gerri de la Sal)
