= Masies de Llaràs =

- Locality
- Masies de Llaras
- Location within Province of Lleida Location within Catalonia Location within Spain
- Coordinates: 42°18′55″N 1°3′4″E
- Country: Spain
- Community: Catalonia
- Province: Lleida
- Municipality: Baix Pallars

Population
  - Total: 5

Masies de Llaràs or Masies de Llaras is a locality located in the municipality of Baix Pallars, in Province of Lleida province, Catalonia, Spain. As of 2020, it has a population of 5.

== Geography ==
Masies de Llaràs is located 122km north-northeast of Lleida.
