= Balestui =

- Locality
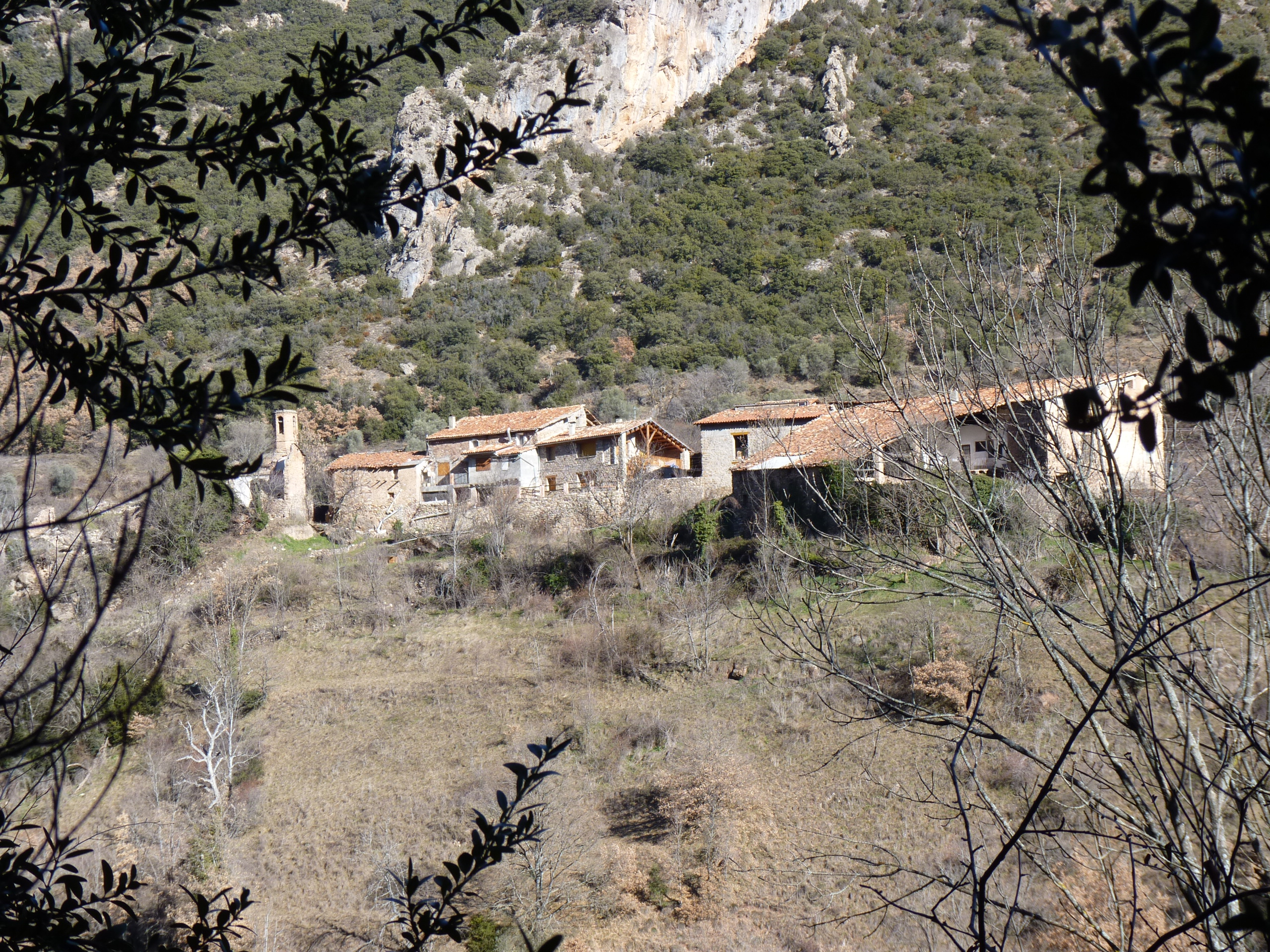

- Location within Province of Lleida Location within Catalonia Location within Spain
- Coordinates: 42°20′26″N 1°1′59″E
- Country: Spain
- Community: Catalonia
- Province: Lleida
- Municipality: Baix Pallars
- Elevation: 858 m (2,815 ft)

Population
  - Total: 9

Balestui is a hamlet located in the municipality of Baix Pallars, in Province of Lleida province, Catalonia, Spain. As of 2020, it has a population of 9.

== Geography ==
Balestui is located 123km north-northeast of Lleida.
