= Peracalç =

- Locality
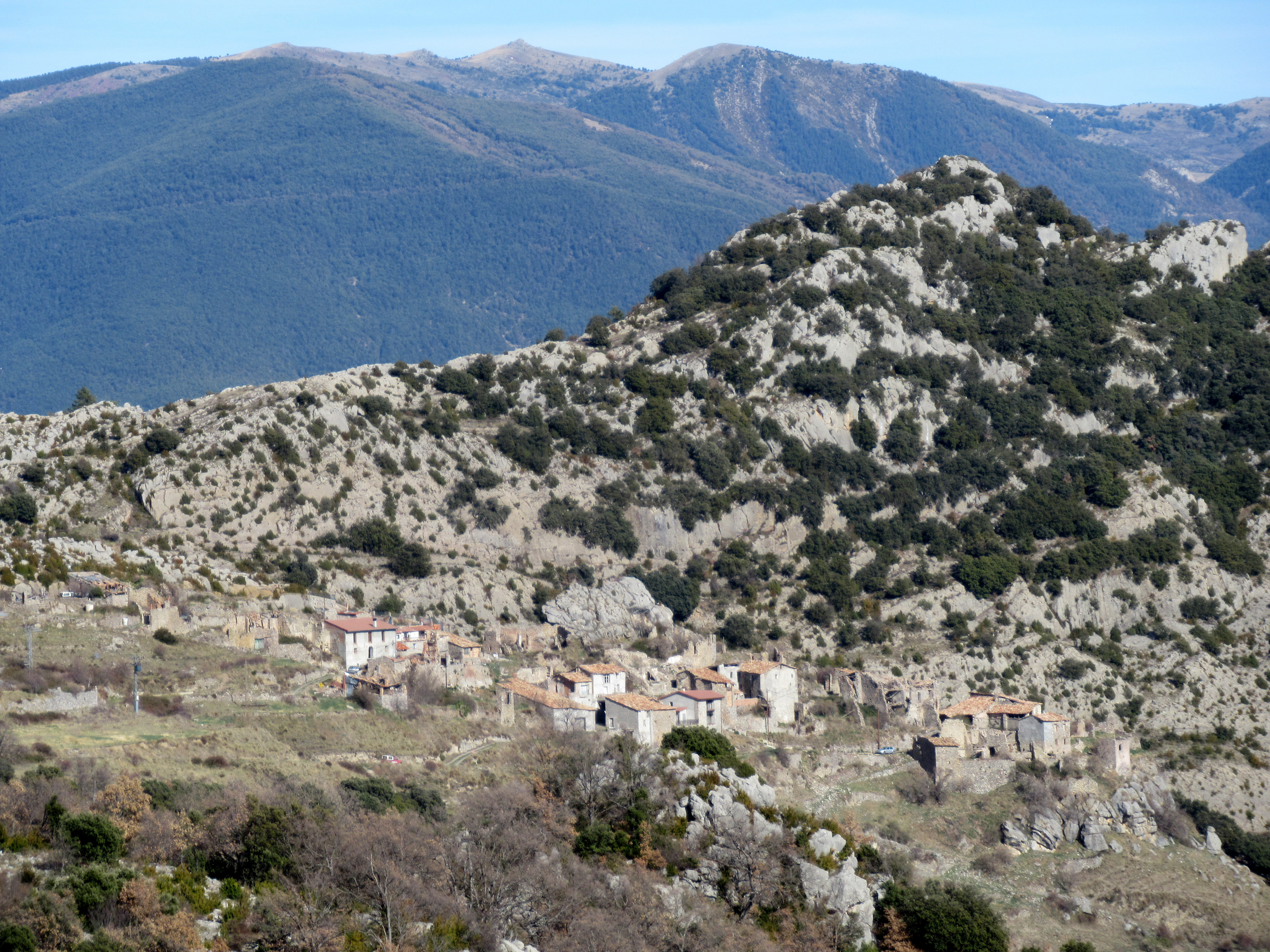

- Location within Province of Lleida Location within Catalonia Location within Spain
- Coordinates: 42°18′24″N 1°0′19″E
- Country: Spain
- Community: Catalonia
- Province: Lleida
- Municipality: Baix Pallars
- Elevation: 1,190 m (3,900 ft)

Population
  - Total: 7

Peracalç is a hamlet located in the municipality of Baix Pallars, in Province of Lleida province, Catalonia, Spain. As of 2020, it has a population of 7.

== Geography ==
Peracalç is located 128km north-northeast of Lleida.
