= Mentui =

- Locality
- Location within Province of Lleida Location within Catalonia Location within Spain
- Coordinates: 42°19′50″N 0°58′32″E
- Country: Spain
- Community: Catalonia
- Province: Lleida
- Municipality: Baix Pallars
- Elevation: 1,038 m (3,406 ft)

Population
  - Total: 4

Mentui is a hamlet located in the municipality of Baix Pallars, in Province of Lleida province, Catalonia, Spain. As of 2020, it has a population of 4.

== Geography ==
Mentui is located 125km north-northeast of Lleida.
