= Cortscastell =

- Locality
- Location within Province of Lleida Location within Catalonia Location within Spain
- Coordinates: 42°19′15″N 1°1′29″E
- Country: Spain
- Community: Catalonia
- Province: Lleida
- Municipality: Baix Pallars
- Elevation: 828 m (2,717 ft)

Population
  - Total: 2

Cortscastell is a hamlet located in the municipality of Baix Pallars, in Province of Lleida province, Catalonia, Spain. As of 2020, it has a population of 2.

== Geography ==
Cortscastell is located 121km north-northeast of Lleida.
