= Montcortès =

- Locality
- Location within Province of Lleida Location within Catalonia Location within Spain
- Coordinates: 42°19′45″N 1°0′19″E
- Country: Spain
- Community: Catalonia
- Province: Lleida
- Municipality: Baix Pallars
- Elevation: 1,063 m (3,488 ft)

Population
  - Total: 22

Montcortès is a hamlet located in the municipality of Baix Pallars, in Province of Lleida province, Catalonia, Spain. As of 2020, it has a population of 22.

== Geography ==
Montcortès is located 122km north-northeast of Lleida.
