= Baén =

- Locality
- Location within Province of Lleida Location within Catalonia Location within Spain
- Coordinates: 42°19′36″N 1°6′20″E
- Country: Spain
- Community: Catalonia
- Province: Lleida
- Municipality: Baix Pallars
- Elevation: 1,070 m (3,510 ft)

Population
  - Total: 10

Baén (in Spanish: Bahent) is a hamlet located in the municipality of Baix Pallars, in Province of Lleida province, Catalonia, Spain. As of 2020, it has a population of 10.

== Geography ==
Baén is located 126km north-northeast of Lleida.
