= Bretui =

- Locality
- Location within Province of Lleida Location within Catalonia Location within Spain
- Coordinates: 42°19′58″N 1°1′18″E
- Country: Spain
- Community: Catalonia
- Province: Lleida
- Municipality: Baix Pallars
- Elevation: 1,055 m (3,461 ft)

Population
  - Total: 14

Bretui is a hamlet located in the municipality of Baix Pallars, in Province of Lleida province, Catalonia, Spain. As of 2020, it has a population of 14.

== Geography ==
Bretui is located 124km north-northeast of Lleida.
