= Baix Pallars =

- Municipality
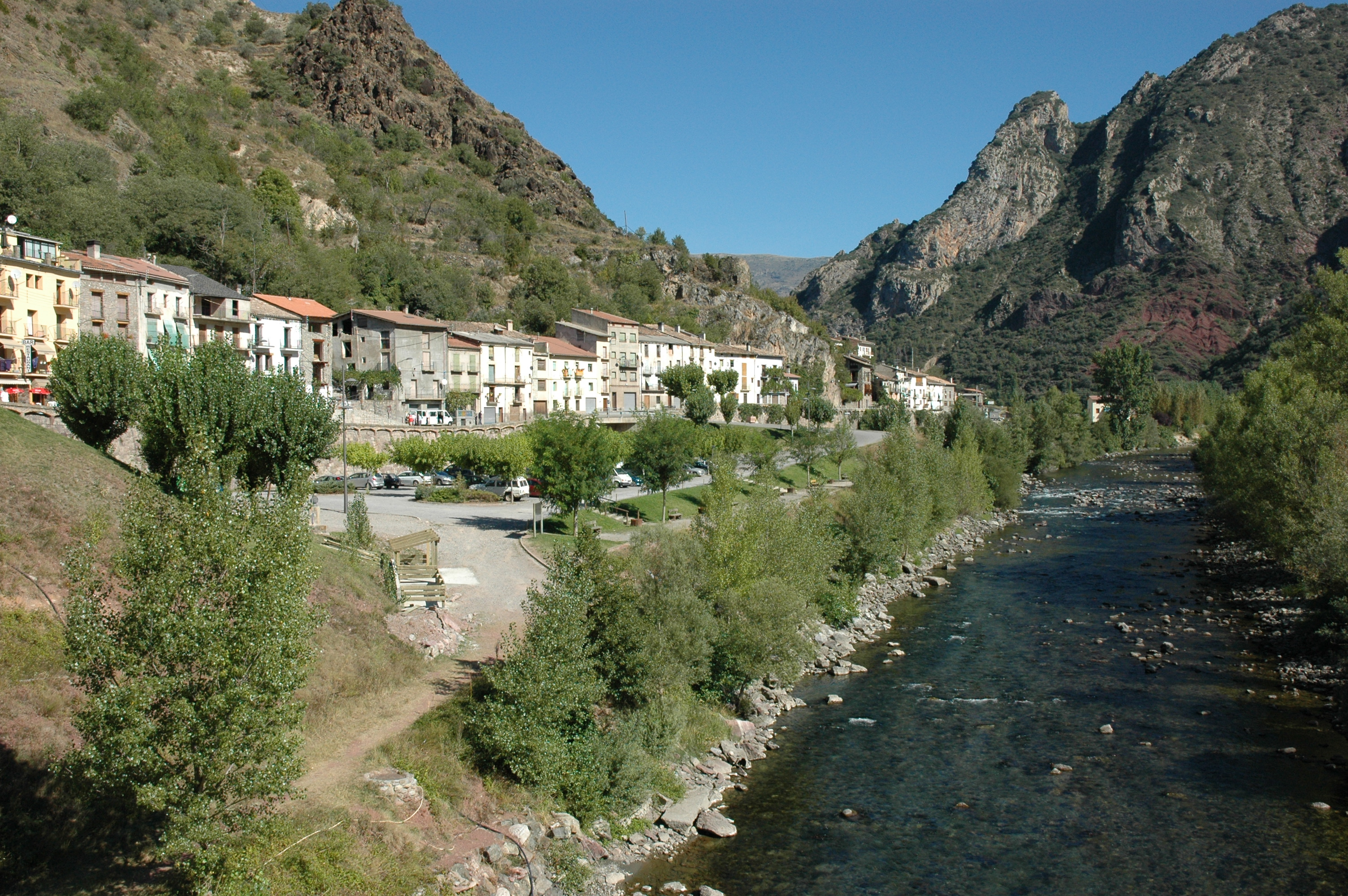
- Gerri de la Sal

- Flag Coat of arms

- Location in Pallars Sobirà county

- Location within Catalonia Location within Spain
- Coordinates: 42°19′32″N 1°3′56″E
- Sovereign state: Spain
- Community: Catalonia
- Region: Alt Pirineu
- County: Pallars Sobirà
- Province: Lleida

Government
  - Mayor: Anna Sentinella Amengual (Som-hi Baix Pallars) (2023)

Area
  - Total: 129.4 km^{2} (50.0 sq mi)
- Elevation: 591 m (1,939 ft)

Population (2025-01-01)
  - Total: 345
  - Density: 2.67/km^{2} (6.91/sq mi)
- Time zone: UTC+1 (CET)
  - Summer (DST): UTC+2 (CEST)
- Website: baixpallars.ddl.net

Baix Pallars (Catalan pronunciation: [ˈbajʃ paˈʎas]) is a town and municipality in Pallars Sobirà county, Province of Lleida, Catalonia, Spain. It has a population of 345 (register office, 2025).

The village of Gerri de la Sal is the administrative center of the municipality and home to the medieval monastery of Santa Maria de Gerri.

== History ==
The Baix Pallars municipality was established in 1969 with the merger of the Baén, Gerri de la Sal, Montcortès de Pallars and Peramea municipalities.

== Villages ==
The municipality includes the following villages and hamlets with their respective population.

- Ancs, 3 inhabitants
- Baén, 15 inhabitants
- Balestui, 10 inhabitants
- Bresca, 17 inhabitants
- Bretui, 16 inhabitants
- Buseu, 1 inhabitant
- Canals, 0 inhabitants
- Cabestany, 2 inhabitants
- Castellnou de Peramea, 2 inhabitants
- El Comte, 3 inhabitants
- Cortscastell, 4 inhabitants
- Cuberes, 0 inhabitants
- L'Espluga de Cuberes, 0 inhabitants
- Enseu, 4 inhabitants
- Gerri de la Sal, 136 inhabitants
- Masies de Llaràs, 8 inhabitants
- Mentui, 5 inhabitants
- Montcortès, 25 inhabitants
- Peracalç, 11 inhabitants
- Peramea, 78 inhabitants
- El Pui, 0 inhabitants
- Pujol, 19 inhabitants
- Sant Sebastià de Buseu, 0 inhabitants
- Sarroca, 2 inhabitants
- Sellui, 15 inhabitants
- El Soi, 0 inhabitants
- Solduga, 1 inhabitant
- Useu, 8 inhabitants
- Vilesa, 0 inhabitants

== See also ==
- Pallars
- Pallars Sobirà
