= Cabestany (Montcortès de Pallars) =

- Locality
- Location within Province of Lleida Location within Catalonia Location within Spain
- Coordinates: 42°19′52″N 0°59′4″E
- Country: Spain
- Community: Catalonia
- Province: Lleida
- Municipality: Baix Pallars
- Elevation: 1,129 m (3,704 ft)

Population
  - Total: 4

Cabestany is a hamlet located in the municipality of Baix Pallars, in Province of Lleida province, Catalonia, Spain. As of 2020, it has a population of 4.

== Geography ==
Cabestany is located 124km north-northeast of Lleida.
