= Useu =

- Locality
- Location within Province of Lleida Location within Catalonia Location within Spain
- Coordinates: 42°18′36″N 1°5′10″E
- Country: Spain
- Community: Catalonia
- Province: Lleida
- Municipality: Baix Pallars
- Elevation: 852 m (2,795 ft)

Population
  - Total: 8

Useu is a hamlet located in the municipality of Baix Pallars, in Province of Lleida province, Catalonia, Spain. As of 2020, it has a population of 8.

== Geography ==
Useu is located 123km north-northeast of Lleida.
