= Buseu =

- Locality
- Location within Province of Lleida Location within Catalonia Location within Spain
- Coordinates: 42°18′22″N 1°7′2″E
- Country: Spain
- Community: Catalonia
- Province: Lleida
- Municipality: Baix Pallars
- Elevation: 1,340 m (4,400 ft)

Population
  - Total: 1

Buseu is a hamlet located in the municipality of Baix Pallars, in Province of Lleida province, Catalonia, Spain. As of 2020, it has a population of 1.

== Geography ==
Buseu is located 131km north-northeast of Lleida.
