= El Comte =

- Locality
- Location within Province of Lleida Location within Catalonia Location within Spain
- Coordinates: 42°19′57″N 1°3′58″E
- Country: Spain
- Community: Catalonia
- Province: Lleida
- Municipality: Baix Pallars
- Elevation: 609 m (1,998 ft)

Population
  - Total: 0

El Comte is a hamlet located in the municipality of Baix Pallars, in Province of Lleida province, Catalonia, Spain. As of 2020, it has a population of 0.

== Geography ==
El Comte is located 120km north-northeast of Lleida.
