= Vilesa =

- Locality
- Location within Province of Lleida Location within Catalonia Location within Spain
- Coordinates: 42°19′3″N 1°5′30″E
- Country: Spain
- Community: Catalonia
- Province: Lleida
- Municipality: Baix Pallars

Population
  - Total: 0

Vilesa is a hamlet located in the municipality of Baix Pallars, in Province of Lleida province, Catalonia, Spain. As of 2020, it has a population of 0.

== Geography ==
Vilesa is located 124km north-northeast of Lleida.
