= Ancs =

- Locality
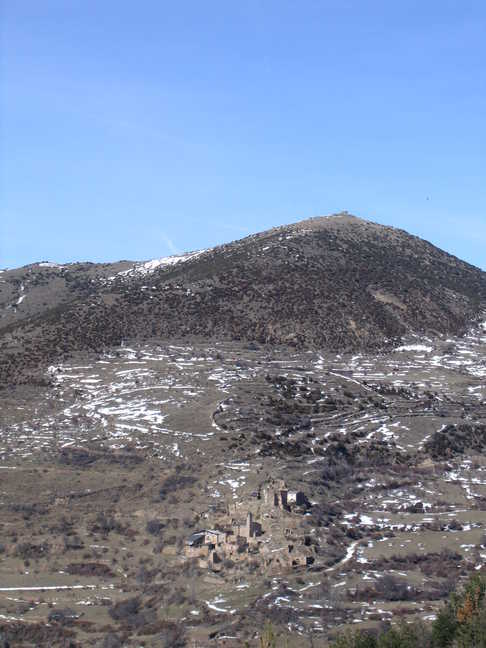

- Location within Province of Lleida Location within Catalonia Location within Spain
- Coordinates: 42°22′56″N 1°1′9″E
- Country: Spain
- Community: Catalonia
- Province: Lleida
- Municipality: Baix Pallars
- Elevation: 1,453 m (4,767 ft)

Population
  - Total: 4

Ancs is a hamlet located in the municipality of Baix Pallars, in Province of Lleida province, Catalonia, Spain. As of 2020, it has a population of 4.

== Geography ==
Ancs is located 132km north-northeast of Lleida.
