= Cuberes =

- Locality
- Location within Province of Lleida Location within Catalonia Location within Spain
- Coordinates: 42°16′38″N 1°8′34″E
- Country: Spain
- Community: Catalonia
- Province: Lleida
- Municipality: Baix Pallars
- Elevation: 1,478 m (4,849 ft)

Population
  - Total: 0

Cuberes is a deserted hamlet located in the municipality of Baix Pallars, in Province of Lleida province, Catalonia, Spain. As of 2020, it has a population of 0.

== Geography ==
Cuberes is located 160km north-northeast of Lleida.
