= Peramea =

- Locality
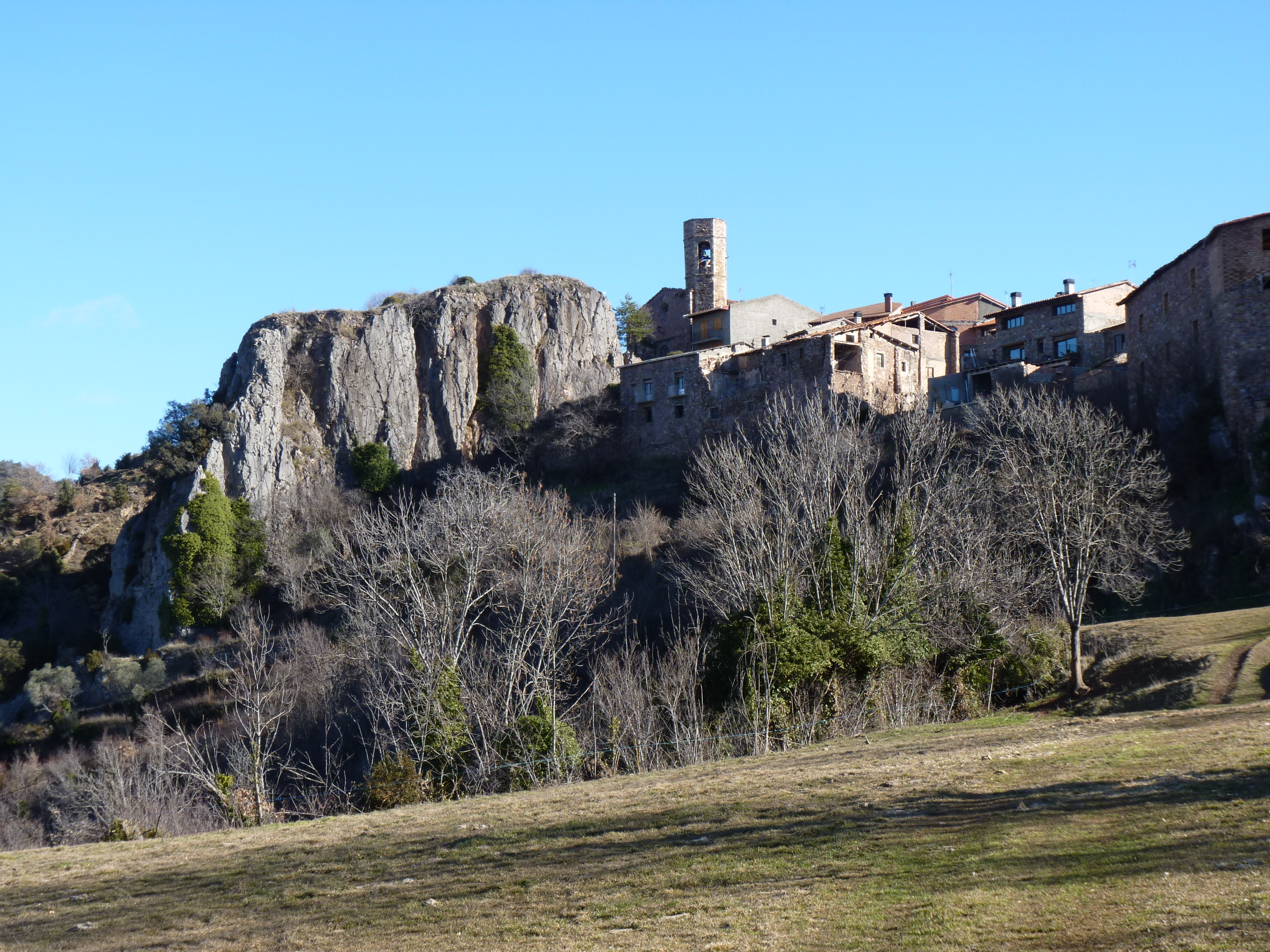

- Location within Province of Lleida Location within Catalonia Location within Spain
- Coordinates: 42°19′43″N 1°2′52″E
- Country: Spain
- Community: Catalonia
- Province: Lleida
- Municipality: Baix Pallars
- Elevation: 901 m (2,956 ft)

Population
  - Total: 80

Peramea is a village located in the municipality of Baix Pallars, in Province of Lleida province, Catalonia, Spain. As of 2020, it has a population of 80.

== Geography ==
Peramea is located 121km north-northeast of Lleida.
