= Sant Sebastià de Buseu =

- Locality
- Location within Province of Lleida Location within Catalonia Location within Spain
- Coordinates: 42°19′33″N 1°8′11″E
- Country: Spain
- Community: Catalonia
- Province: Lleida
- Municipality: Baix Pallars
- Elevation: 1,581 m (5,187 ft)

Population
  - Total: 0

Sant Sebastià de Buseu is a locality located in the municipality of Baix Pallars, in Province of Lleida province, Catalonia, Spain. As of 2020, it has a population of 0.

== Geography ==
Sant Sebastià de Buseu is located 133km north-northeast of Lleida.
