= Pujol, Peramea =

Pujol
- Locality
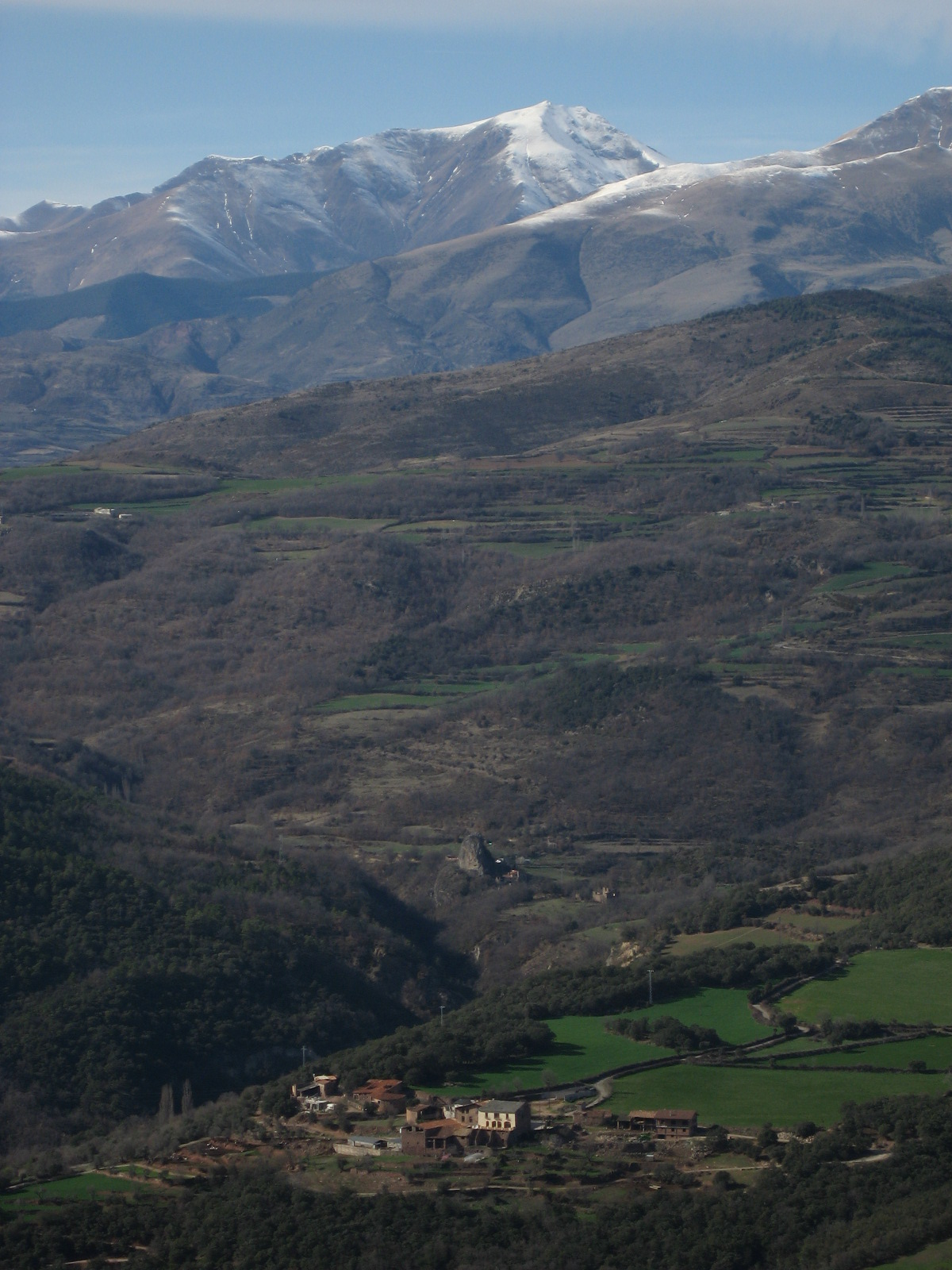

- Location within Province of Lleida Location within Catalonia Location within Spain
- Coordinates: 42°18′35″N 1°2′14″E
- Country: Spain
- Community: Catalonia
- Province: Lleida
- Municipality: Baix Pallars
- Elevation: 830 m (2,720 ft)

Population
  - Total: 12

Pujol is a hamlet located in the municipality of Baix Pallars, in Province of Lleida province, Catalonia, Spain. As of 2020, it has a population of 12.

== Geography ==
Pujol is located 118km north-northeast of Lleida.
