= Castellnou de Peramea =

- Locality
- Castellnou
- Location within Province of Lleida Location within Catalonia Location within Spain
- Coordinates: 42°19′26″N 1°8′48″E
- Country: Spain
- Community: Catalonia
- Province: Lleida
- Municipality: Baix Pallars
- Elevation: 1,602 m (5,256 ft)

Population
  - Total: 1

Castellnou de Peramea or Castellnou is a locality located in the municipality of Baix Pallars, in Province of Lleida province, Catalonia, Spain. As of 2020, it has a population of 1.

== Geography ==
Castellnou de Peramea is located 136km north-northeast of Lleida.
