= Gerri de la Sal =

- Locality
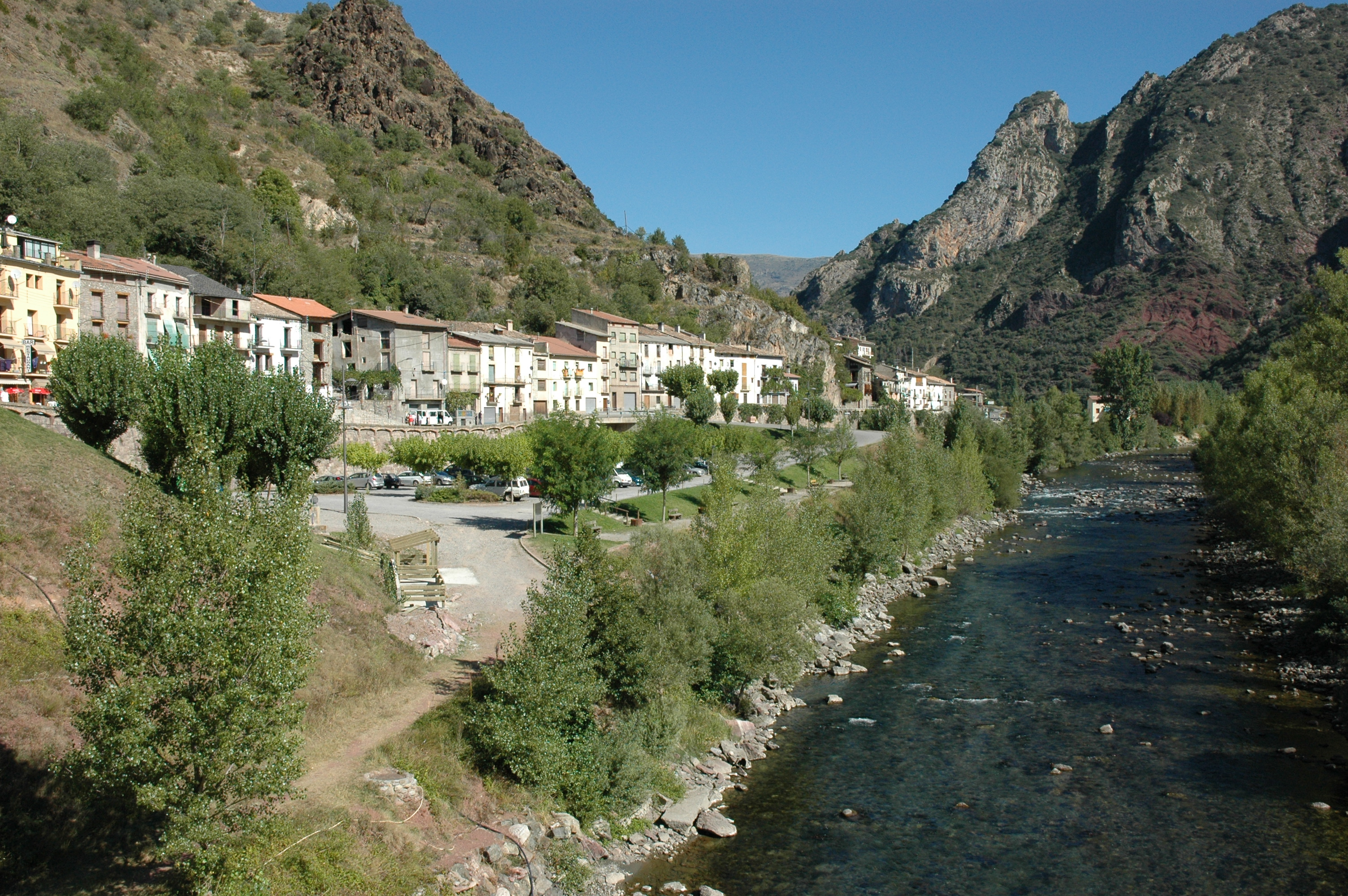

- Location within Province of Lleida Location within Catalonia Location within Spain
- Coordinates: 42°19′32″N 1°4′0″E
- Country: Spain
- Community: Catalonia
- Province: Lleida
- Municipality: Baix Pallars
- Elevation: 589 m (1,932 ft)

Population
  - Total: 117

Gerri de la Sal is a village and administrative center of the municipality of Baix Pallars, in Province of Lleida province, Catalonia, Spain. As of 2020, it has a population of 117.

== Geography ==
Gerri de la Sal is located 119km north-northeast of Lleida.
