= Bresca (Gerri de la Sal) =

- Locality
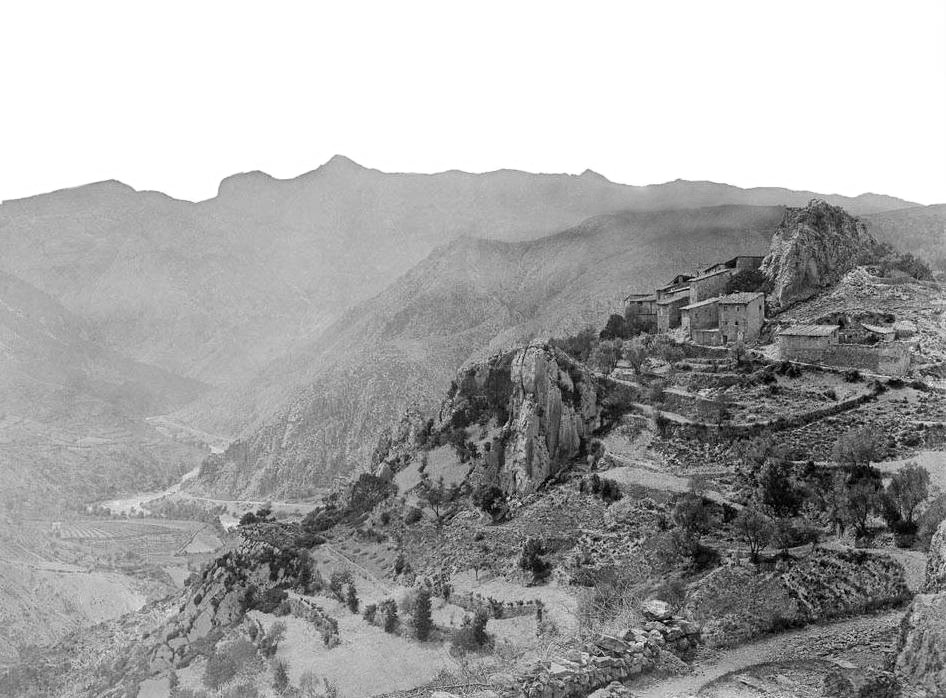

- Location within Province of Lleida Location within Catalonia Location within Spain
- Coordinates: 42°18′41″N 1°4′6″E
- Country: Spain
- Community: Catalonia
- Province: Lleida
- Municipality: Baix Pallars
- Elevation: 782 m (2,566 ft)

Population
  - Total: 12

Bresca is a hamlet located in the municipality of Baix Pallars, in Province of Lleida province, Catalonia, Spain. As of 2020, it has a population of 12.

== Geography ==
Bresca is located 120km north-northeast of Lleida.
