= Museu Nacional d'Art de Catalunya =

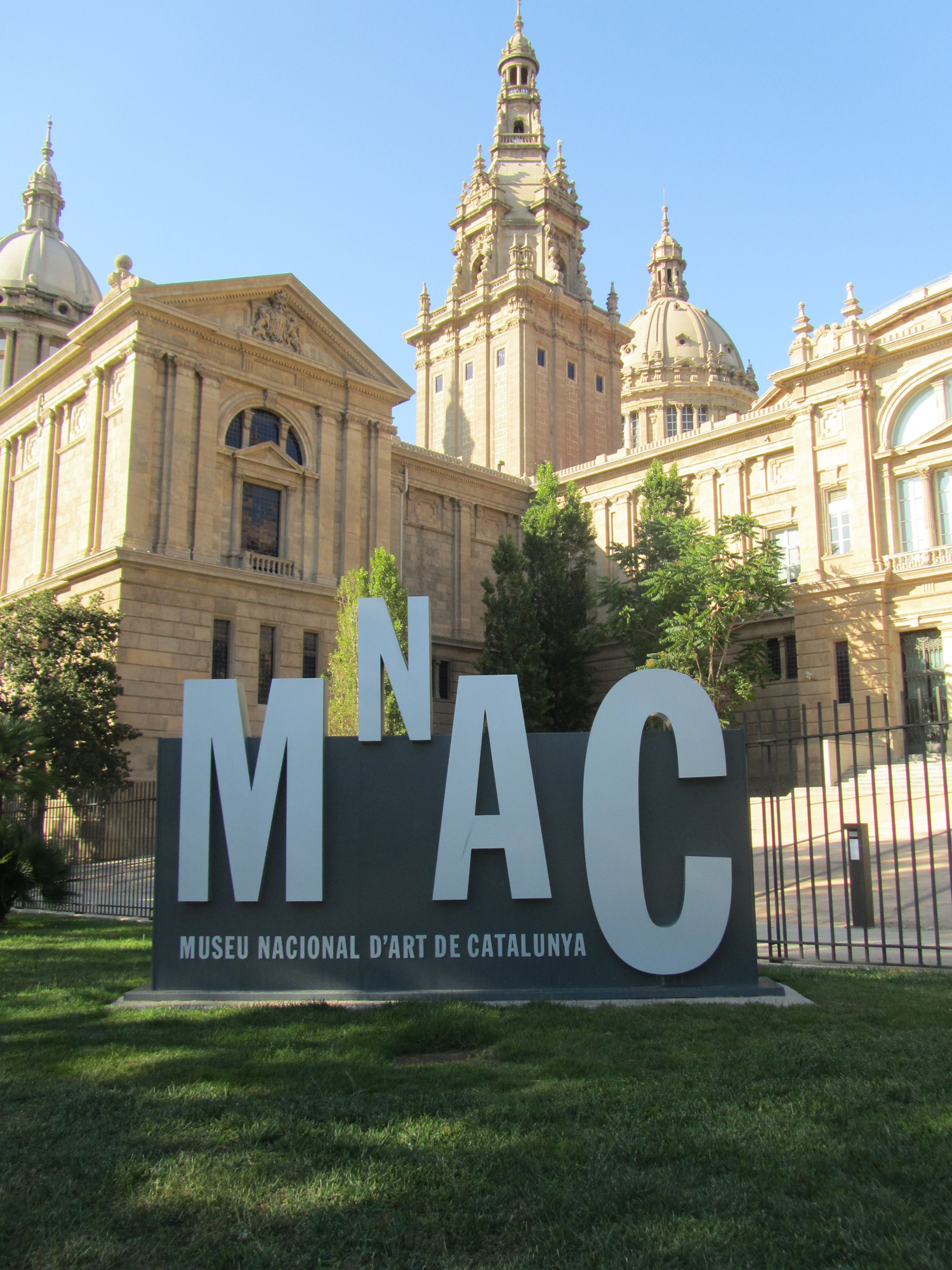
- Museu Nacional d'Art de Catalunya

- Location within Barcelona
- Interactive fullscreen map
- Established: 1934
- Location: Palau Nacional, Barcelona
- Coordinates: 41°22′06″N 2°09′12″E
- Type: Art museum
- Collection size: 290,000
- Visitors: 828,713 (2010)
- Director: Pepe Serra
- Parking: On site (no charge)
- Website: museunacional.cat

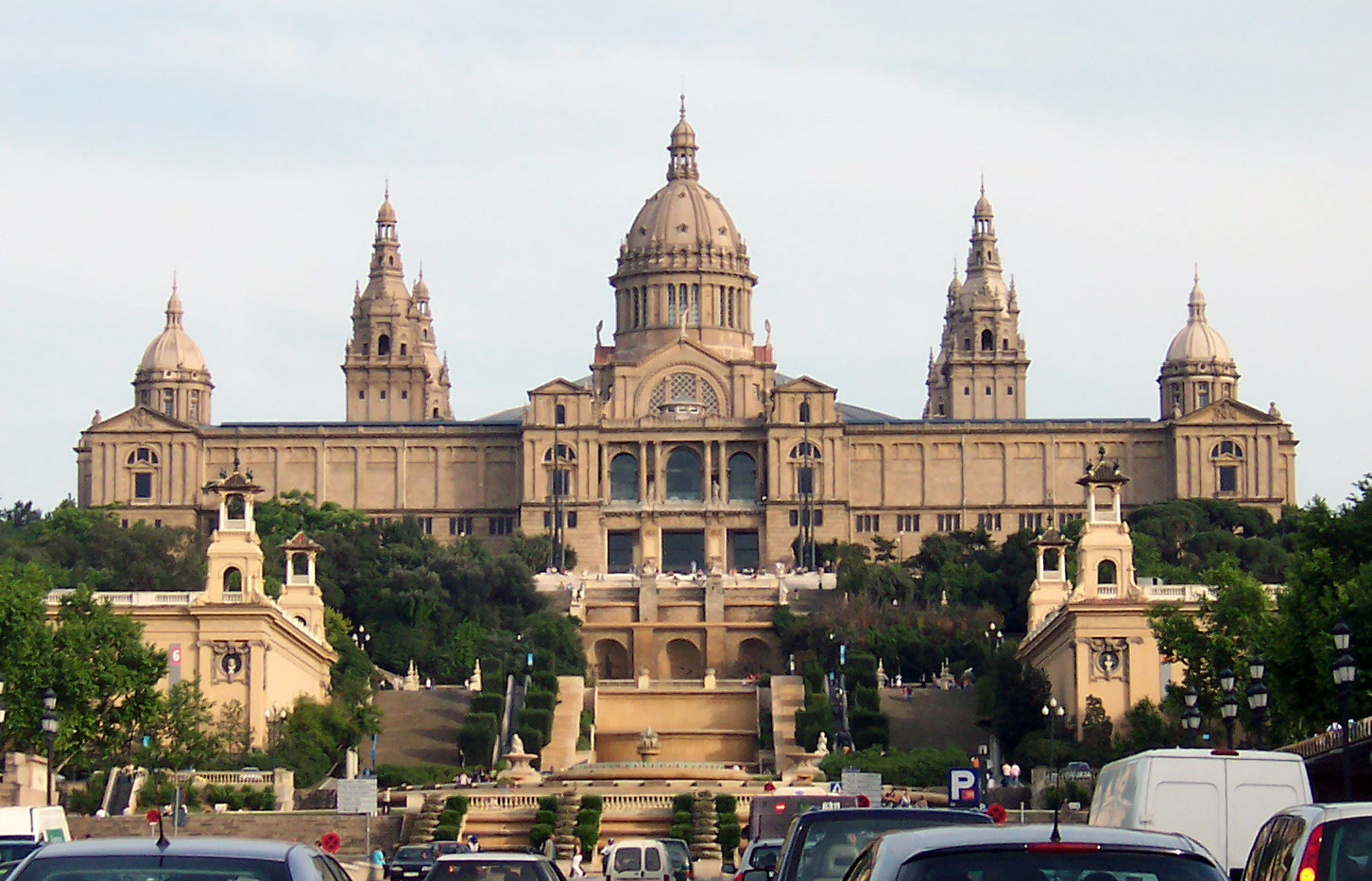
Front view of the Palau Nacional, that houses the museum.

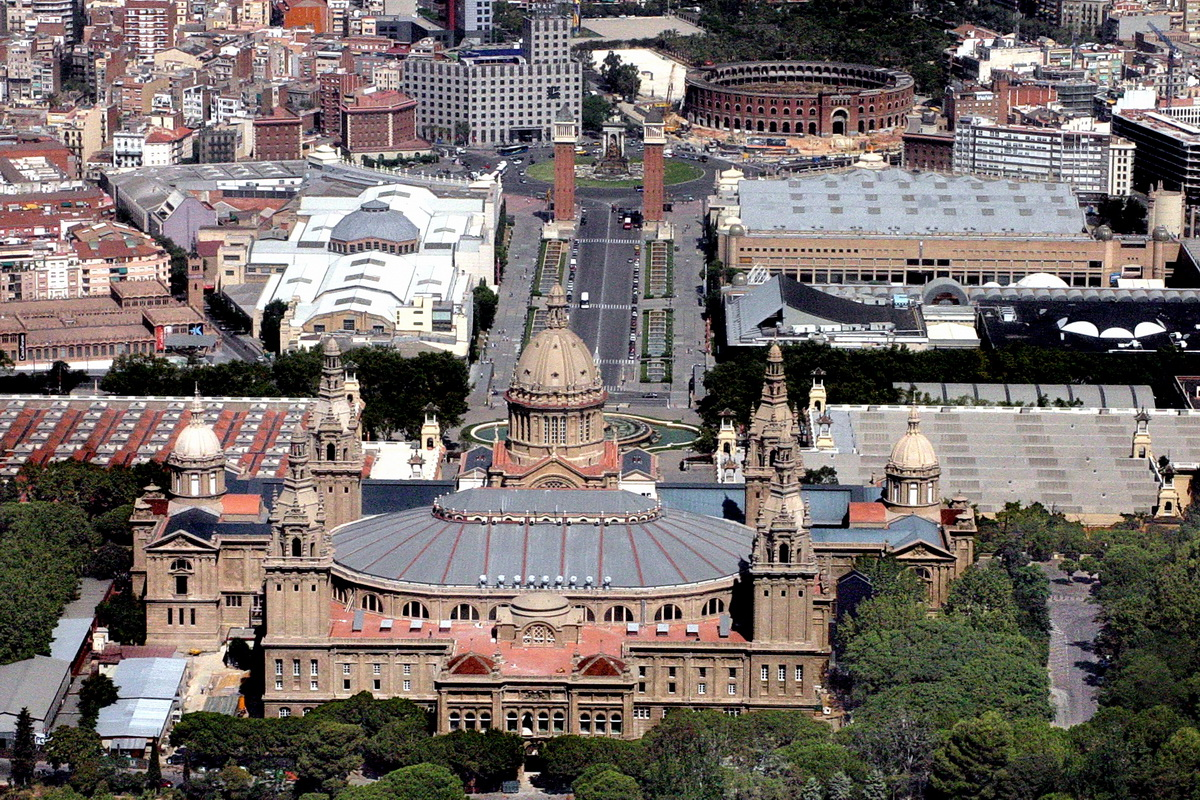
Aerial view of the Palau Nacional, seen from the back.

The Museu Nacional d'Art de Catalunya (Catalan pronunciation: [muˈzɛw nəsi.uˈnal ˈdaɾd də kətəˈluɲə]; English: "National Art Museum of Catalonia"), abbreviated as MNAC (Catalan: [məˈnak]), is a museum of Catalan visual art located in Barcelona, Catalonia, Spain. Situated on Montjuïc hill at the end of Avinguda de la Reina Maria Cristina, near Pl Espanya, the museum is notable for its collection of Romanesque church paintings, and for Catalan art and design from the late 19th and early 20th centuries, including modernisme and noucentisme. The museum is housed in the Palau Nacional, a huge, Italian-style building dating to 1929. The Palau Nacional, which has housed the Museu d'Art de Catalunya since 1934, was declared a national museum in 1990 under the Museums Law passed by the Catalan Government. That same year, a thorough renovation process was launched based on plans drawn up by the architects Gae Aulenti and Enric Steegmann, who were later joined in the undertaking by Josep Benedito Tobias. The Oval Hall was reopened for the 1992 Summer Olympic Games, and the various collections were installed and opened over the period from 1995 (when the Romanesque Art section was reopened) to 2004. The museum was officially inaugurated on 16 December 2004. It is one of the largest museums in Spain.

== History ==
The history of the institution dates back to the 19th century, when, in accordance with the principles that inspired Catalonia's cultural and political Renaixença (renaissance), a movement particularly active in that century, many projects were launched to help revive and conserve the country's artistic heritage. This process began with the establishment of the Museu Provincial d'Antiguitats de Barcelona (Barcelona Provincial Museum of Antiquities) in the Chapel of St Agatha (1880) and the Museu Municipal de Belles Arts de Barcelona (Municipal Fine Art Museum) in the Palau de les Belles Arts (1891), a palace built to mark the occasion of the 1888 Universal Exhibition. A project to install all these Catalan art collections in the Palau Nacional, launched in 1934 under the initiative of Joaquim Folch i Torres, the first director of Catalonia Museum of Art, was frustrated by the outbreak of the Spanish Civil War (1936–1939), when for protection many works were transferred to Olot, Darnius and Paris (where an important exhibit was established). During the postwar period, the 19th- and 20th-century collections were installed in the Museu d'Art Modern (now the Modern Art Collection MNAC within the Museu Nacional d'Art de Catalunya), housed from 1945 to 2004 in the Arsenal building in Barcelona's Parc de la Ciutadella, whilst the Romanesque, Gothic and baroque collections were installed in the Palau in 1942.

The Palau Nacional, which has housed the Museu d'Art de Catalunya since 1934, was declared a national museum in 1990 under the Museums Law passed by the Catalan Government. In 1992 a thorough renovation process was launched to refurbish the site, based on plans drawn up by the architects Gae Aulenti and Enric Steegmann, who were later joined in the undertaking by Josep Benedito. The Oval Hall was reopened in 1992 on the occasion of the Olympic Games, and the various collections were installed and opened over the period from 1995 (when the Romanesque Art section was reopened) to 2004. The Museu Nacional d'Art de Catalunya (Museu Nacional) was officially inaugurated on 16 December 2004.

Since 2004, the Palau Nacional has once more housed several magnificent art collections, mostly by Catalan art, but also Spanish and European art. The works from that first museum have now been enriched by new purchases and donations, tracing the country's art history from early medieval times to the mid-20th century: from Romanesque, Gothic, Renaissance and baroque to modern art. This heritage is completed by the Gabinet Numismàtic de Catalunya (coin and medal collections), the Gabinet de Dibuixos i Gravats (drawings and engravings) and the library.

== Collections ==
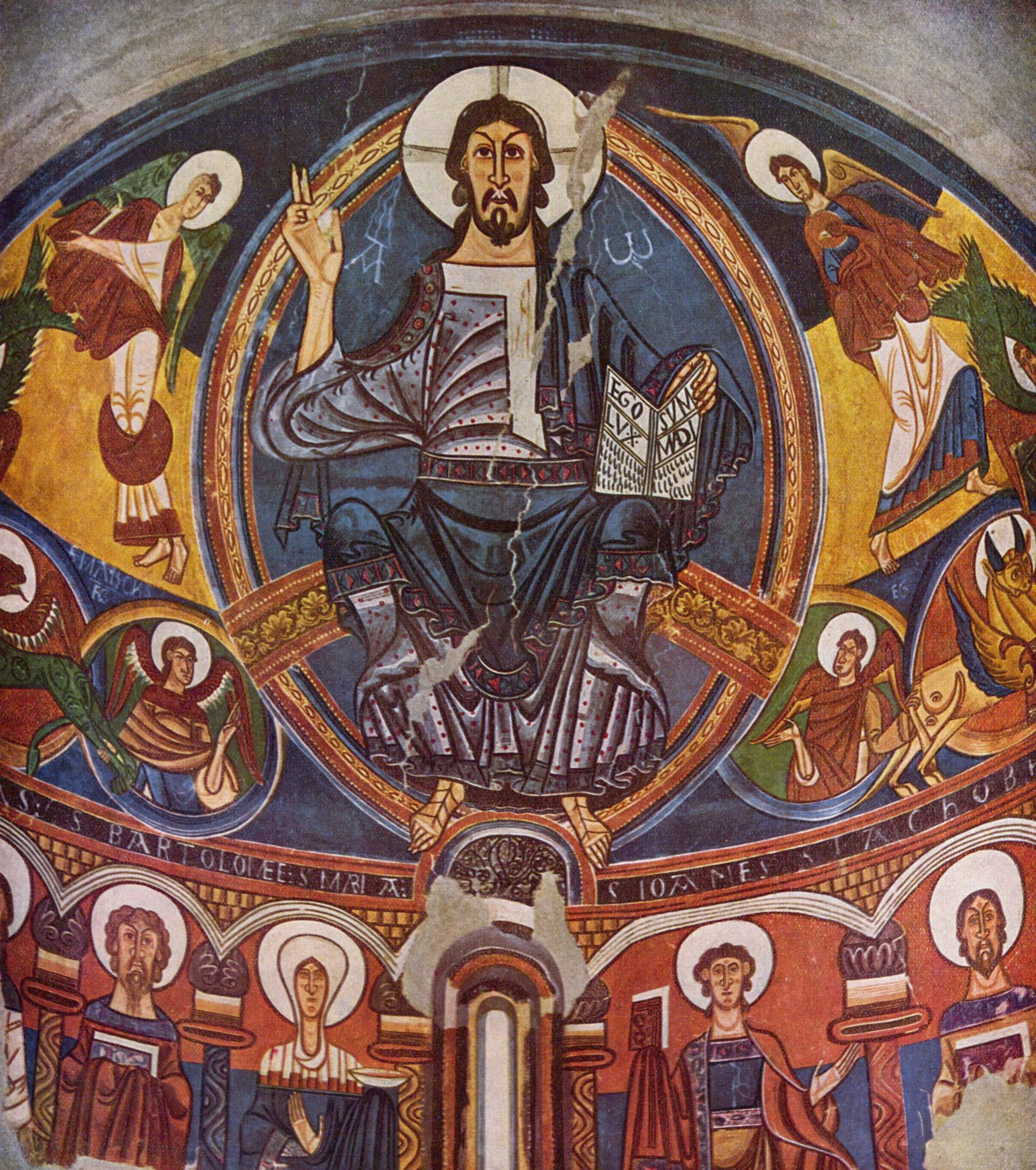
Apse of Sant Climent de Taüll, a fresco from Church of St. Climent de Taüll

=== Romanesque Art ===
Majestat Batlló

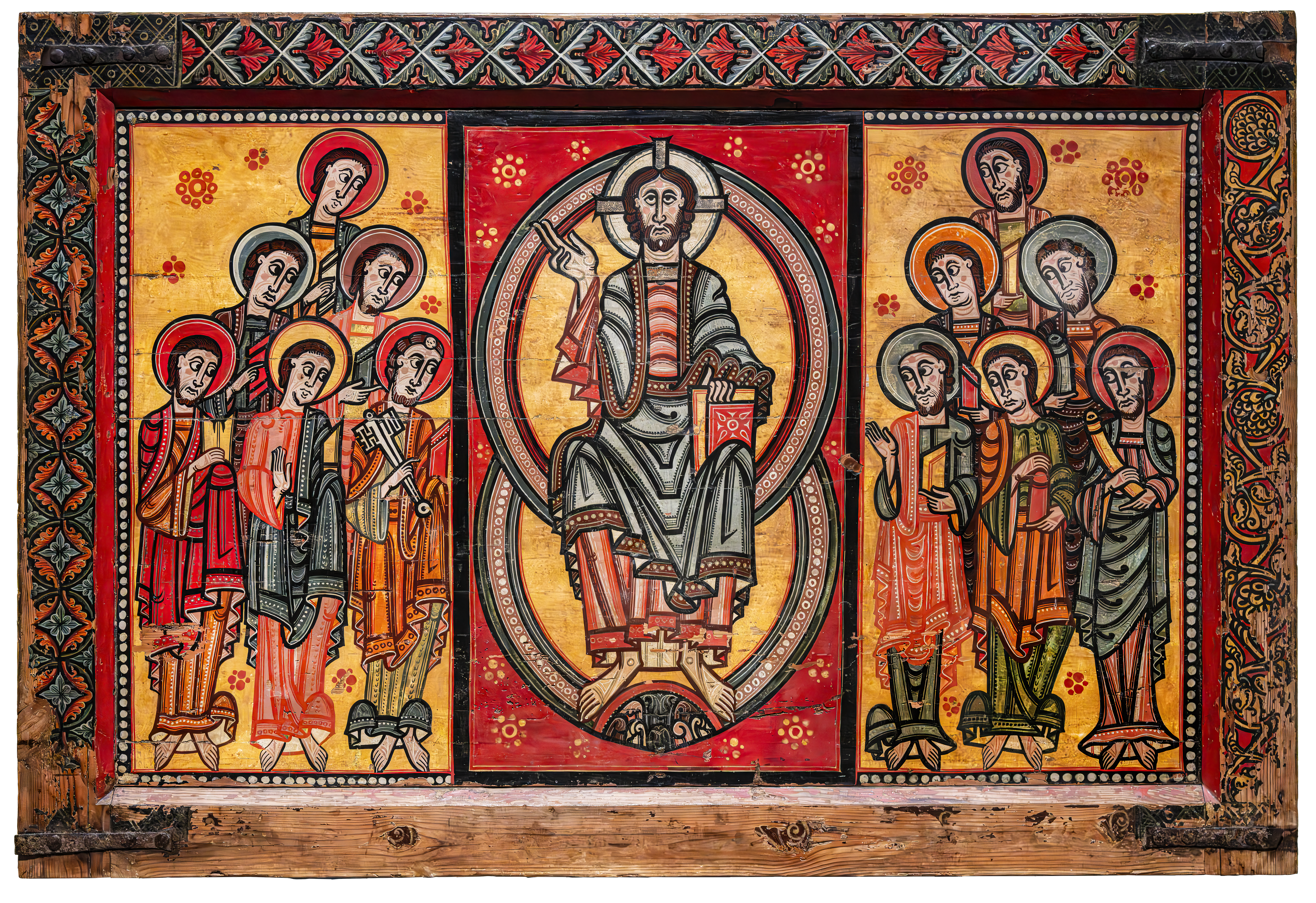
Frontal from La Seu d'Urgell or of The Apostles

With a series of murals, the Romanesque collection is one of the most important in the museum. Indeed, the Museu Nacional Romanesque Collection is unmatched by any other museum in the world. Dating to the 11th to 13th centuries, many of the works originally adorned rural churches in the Pyrenees and other sites in Old Catalonia, or Catalunya Vella in Catalan. The works began to be discovered and studied in the early 20th century, particularly after a Pyrenean expedition in 1907 by the Institut d'Estudis Catalans (Institute of Catalan Studies). The expedition published its findings in Les pintures murals catalanes (Catalan Mural Paintings, 1907–1921).

In the early 1920s many of the Pyrenean murals were moved to Barcelona as a consequence of the actions of an American art dealer in 1919. The art dealer purchased many of the frescos at the former monastery in Castell de Mur, intending to sell them for a profit. The dealer brought in two Italian art restorers who were experts at detaching wall paintings, a technique called "strappo". The frescos were sent to the United States, and they now reside in the Museum of Fine Arts in Boston. There were no laws in Spain forbidding the removal and expatriation of the art, but the shipment of the monastery murals to the United States alarmed the Junta de Museus de Catalunya (Catalan Board of Museums). The Board developed plans to conserve the murals. Hiring the Italian experts, from 1919 to 1923 they successfully intervened to detach many of the ecclesiastical frescos from the rural churches in the Pyrenees and transfer them to the Museum of Barcelona, then housed in the Parc de la Ciutadella. The Romanesque works were thus conserved and protected, and the collection is considered a unique art heritage and a symbol of the birth and formation of Catalonia.

The Romanesque rooms are arranged in chronological and stylistic order, giving visitors a view of the different tendencies in Catalan Romanesque art and featuring works produced, for the most part, in the 11th-13th centuries. This section begins with the mural paintings from Sant Joan in Boí, which show clear stylistic influences from the French Carolingian tradition, and then continues with works showing the Italian influence that dominated painting from the late 11th century, doubtless as a result of the influence of the Gregorian Reform. This style is illustrated in such works as the mural paintings from Sant Quirze de Pedret, Santa Maria d'Àneu and Sant Pere del Burgal. There are also paintings from the Apse of Sant Climent de Taüll, including the 12th century Pantocrator or Christ in Majesty. Beside this piece stands another group of works, from Santa Maria de Taüll, the most important example of the interior of a Romanesque church painted throughout, with much of its decoration conserved today. The Romanesque section ends with the paintings from San Pedro de Arlanza and the chapter house of Sigena. The latter piece was severely damaged by fire during the Spanish Civil War and was moved to the museum for restoration in 1936.

Romanesque rooms also show the techniques that distinguished Catalan art at the time, such as panel painting, wood carving and others that help to complete our aesthetic vision of Romanesque, such as precious metalwork and carving stone.

The collection of panel paintings, unique in Europe, is another singular aspect of Romanesque painting, due both to the number and antiquity of the Catalan works conserved (the result of interest in the Romanesque since the late 19th century) and to their quality and technical diversity. Particularly outstanding are the frontals of the Apostles (also known as the Frontal of La Seu d'Urgell), Alòs d'Isil, Avià and Cardet, which are rightly considered paradigms of an original pictorial technique, embodying enormous artistic interest. Moreover, the wood carving collection completes this wide-ranging summary of Romanesque art, featuring fine works of different types, such as Virgin of Ger, the Batlló Majesty and the carvings in the Erill la Vall Descent from the Cross.

There are also sculptures in stone that form part of the Museu Nacional Romanesque art collection, particularly a number of works from Ripoll and a large group of elements from ensembles in the city of Barcelona, including the refined marble capitals from the former Hospital de Sant Nicolau dels Pontells. Finally, the Romanesque section also features an important collection of enamels, mostly produced in Limoges, such as the Mondoñedo Crosier.

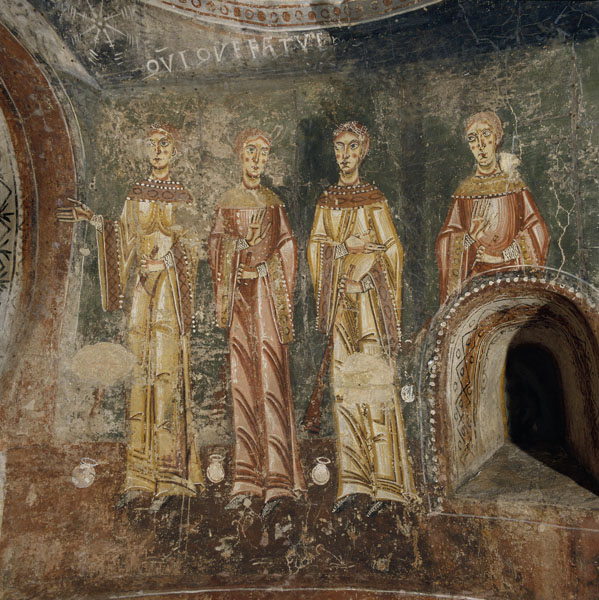
Southern apse from Pedret

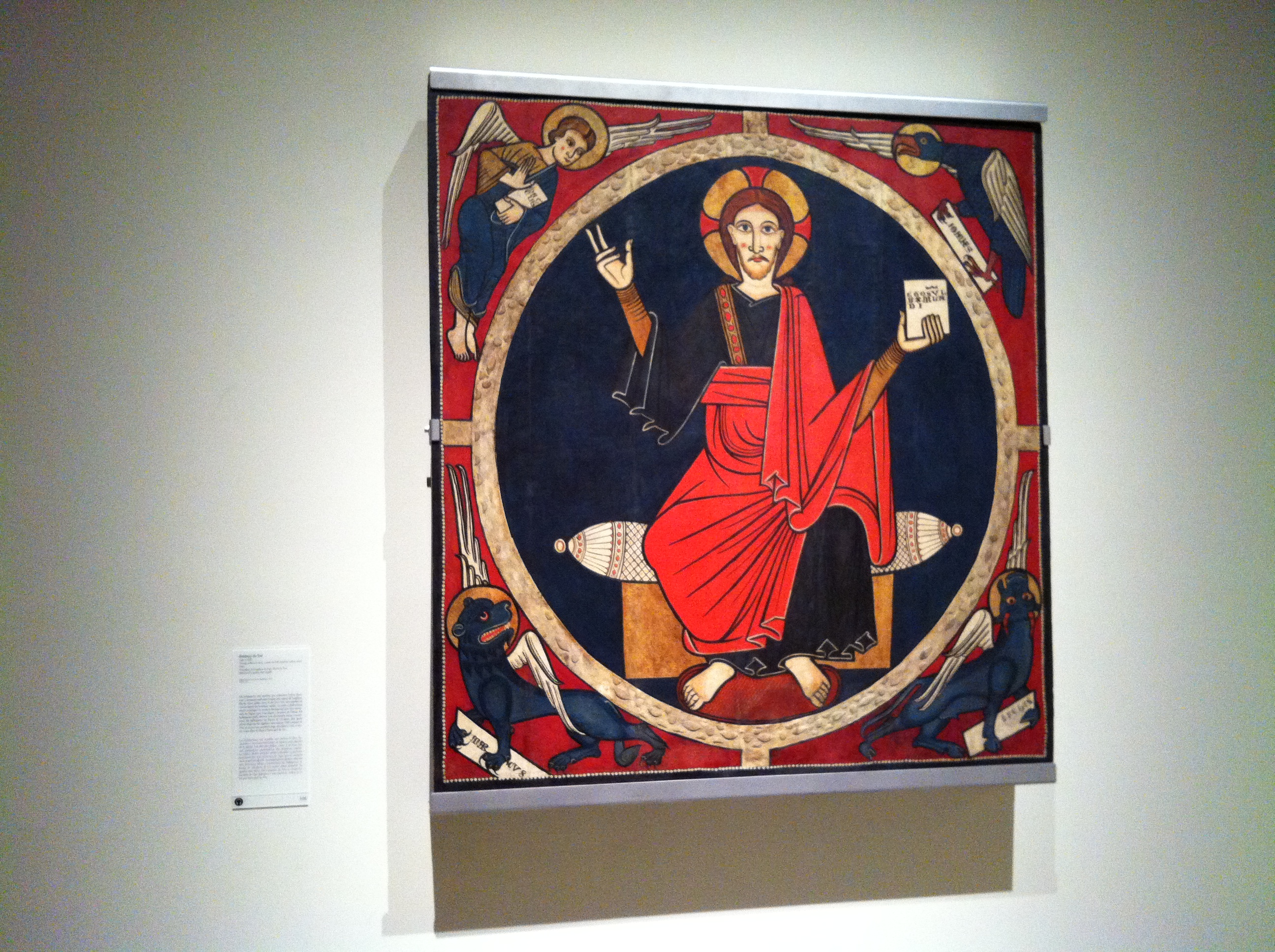
Baldachin from Tost

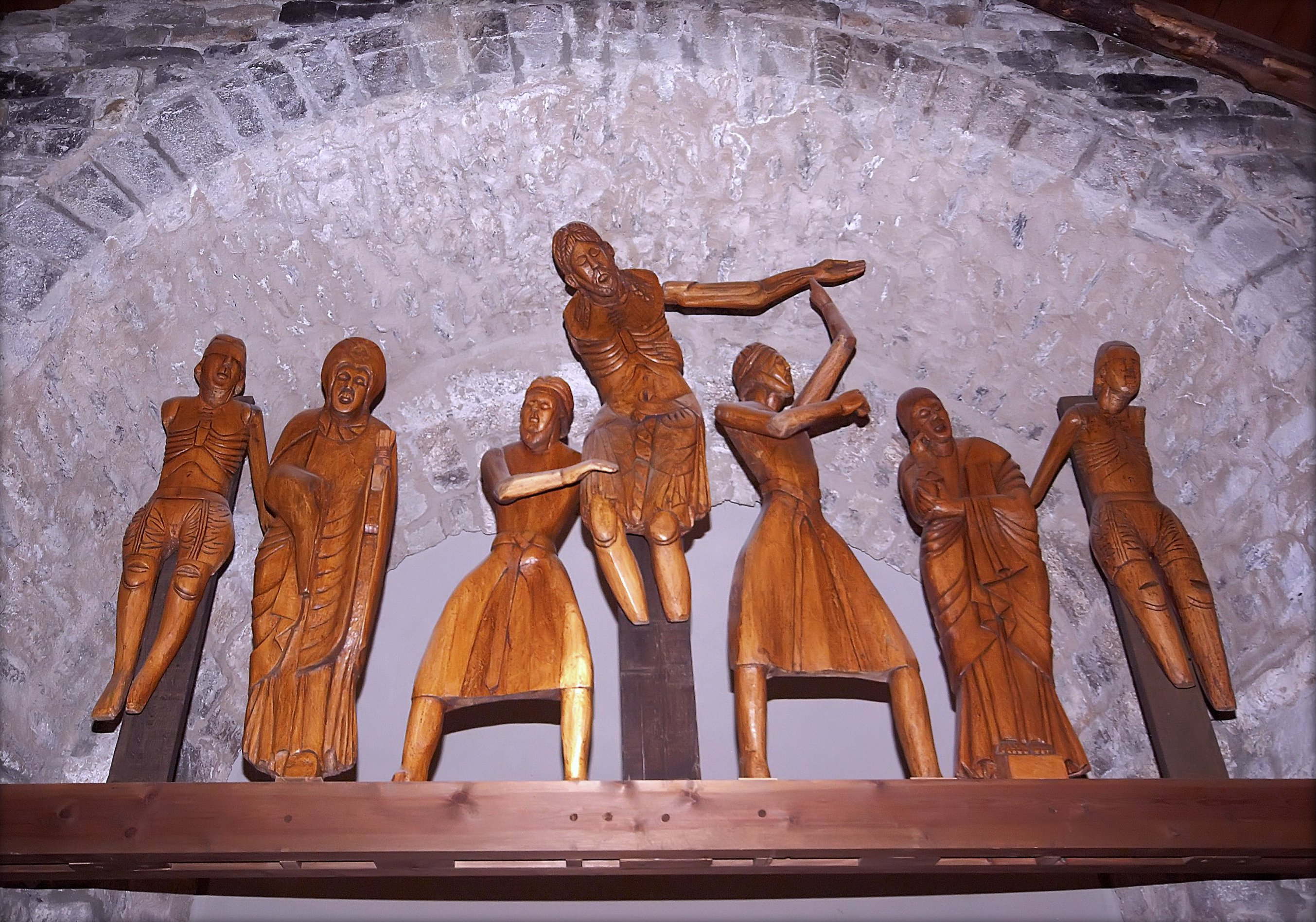
Erill la Vall Descent from the Cross

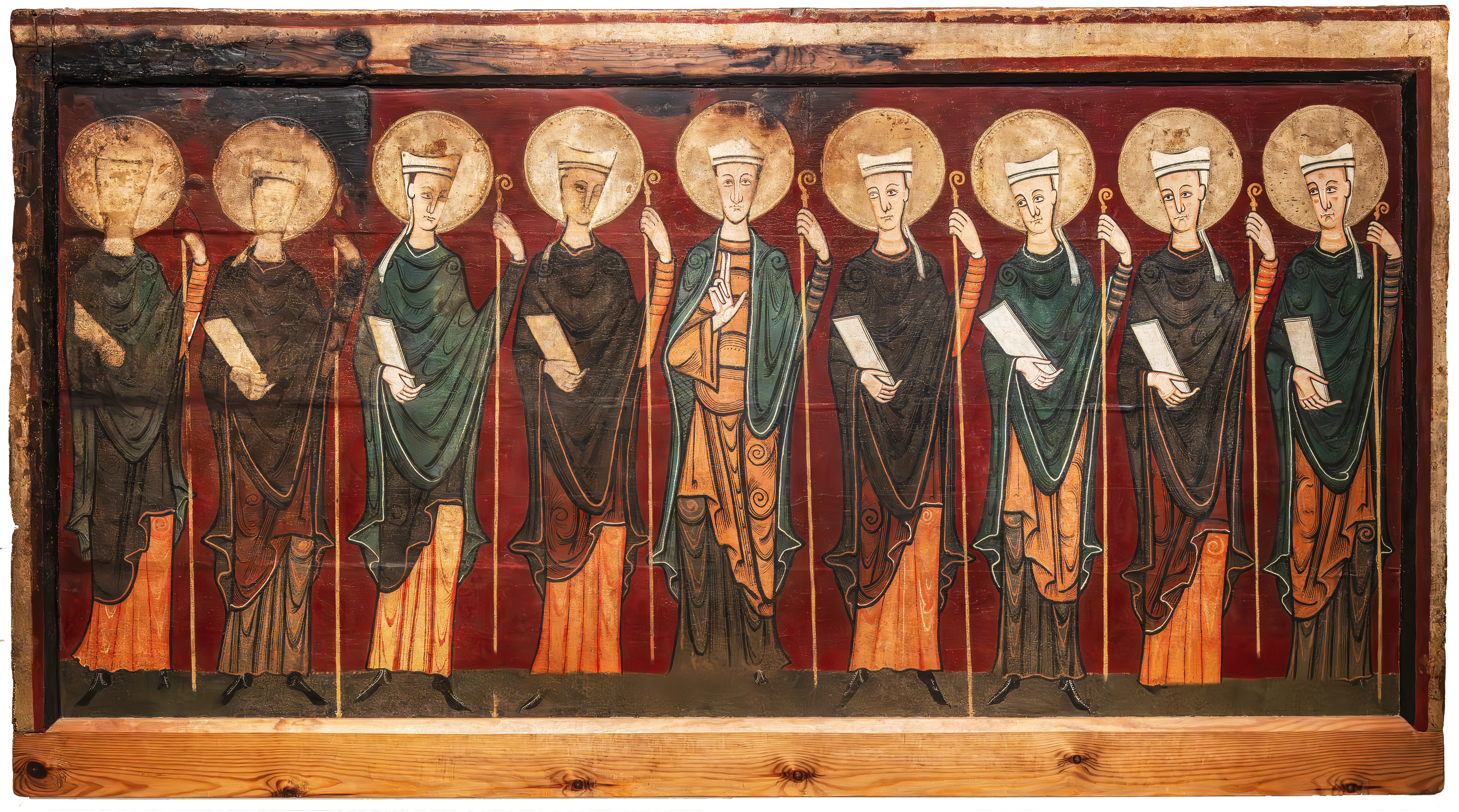
Altar frontal from Tavèrnoles

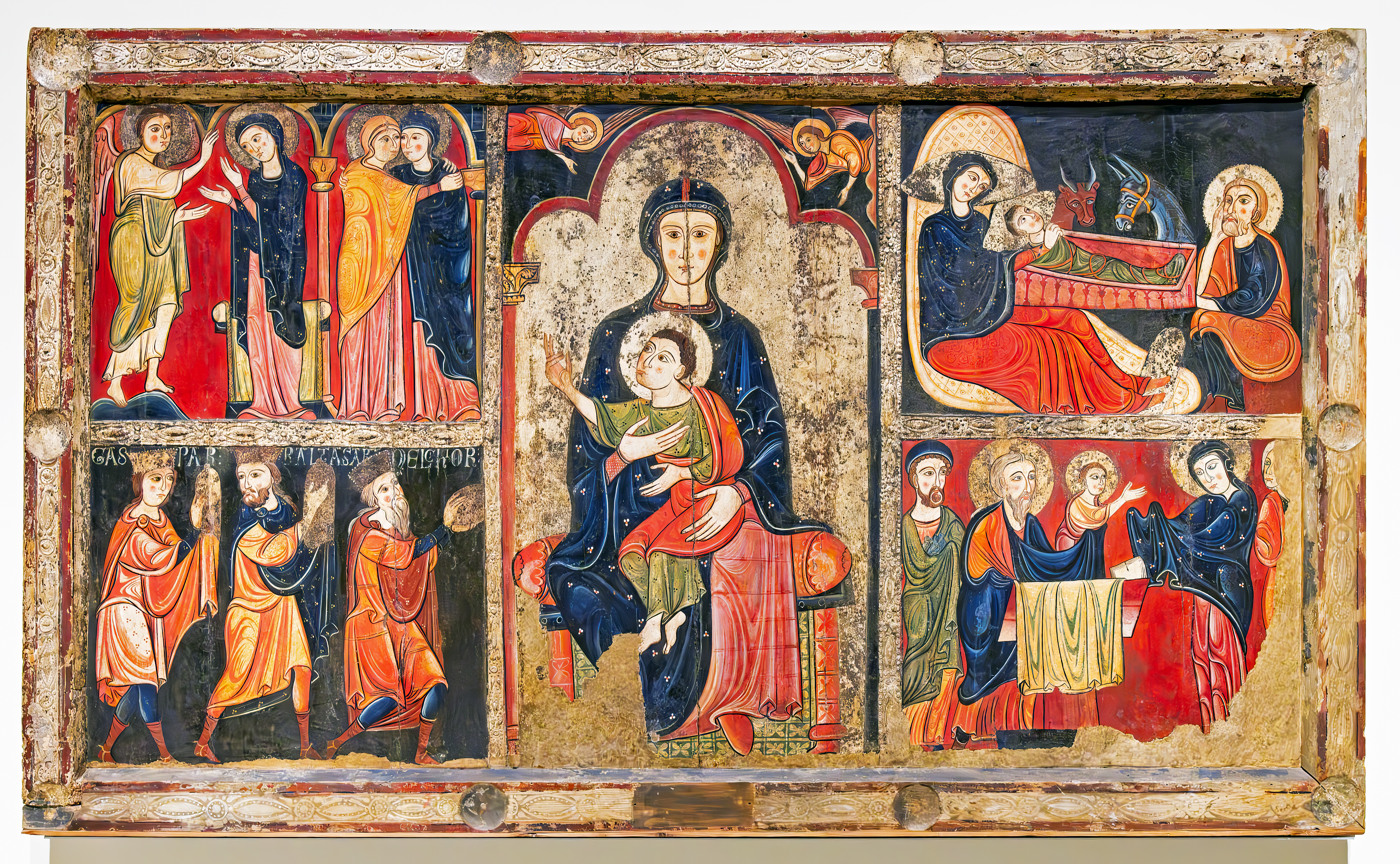
Altar frontal from Avià

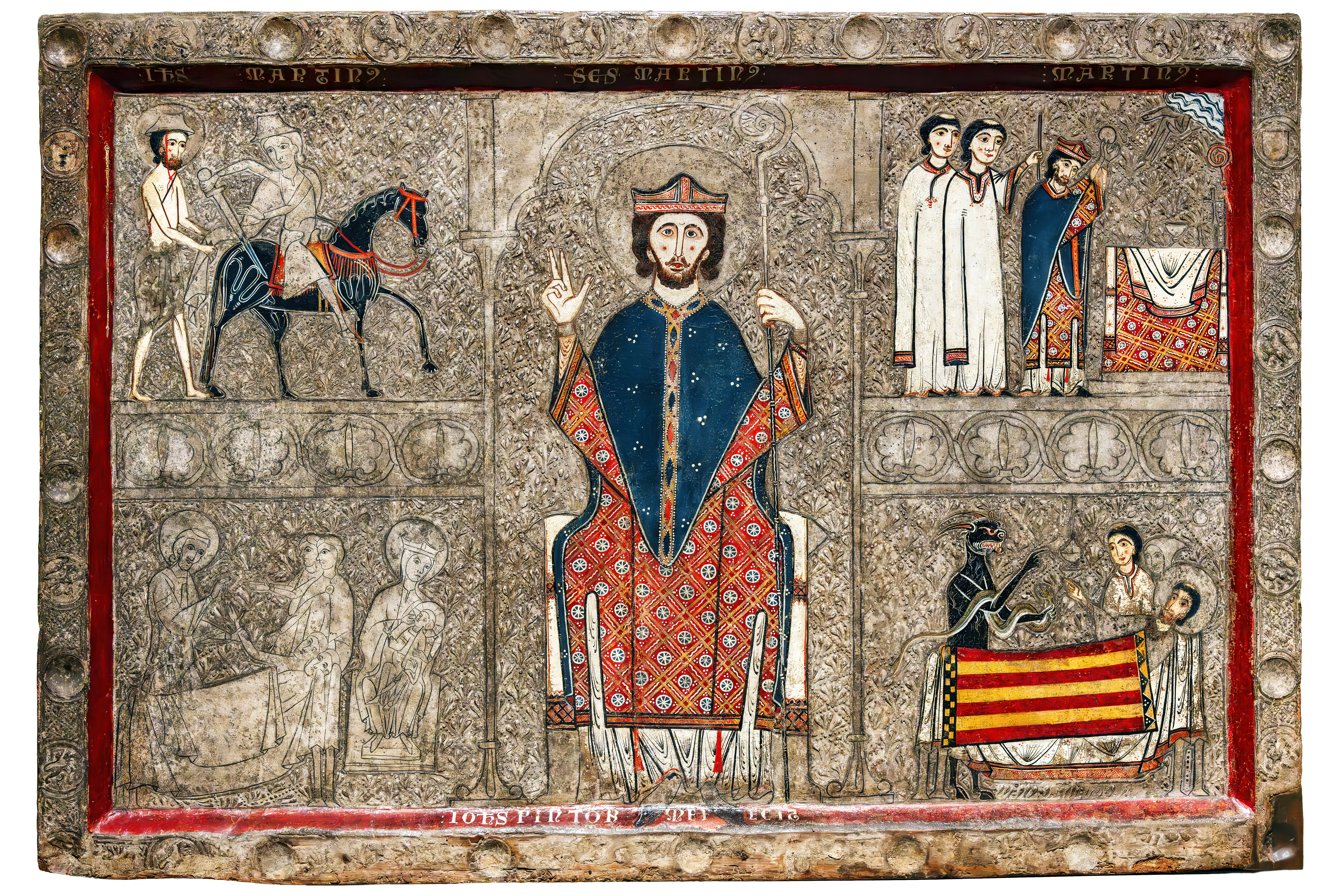
Altar frontal from Gia (from Benasque Valley, Aragon)

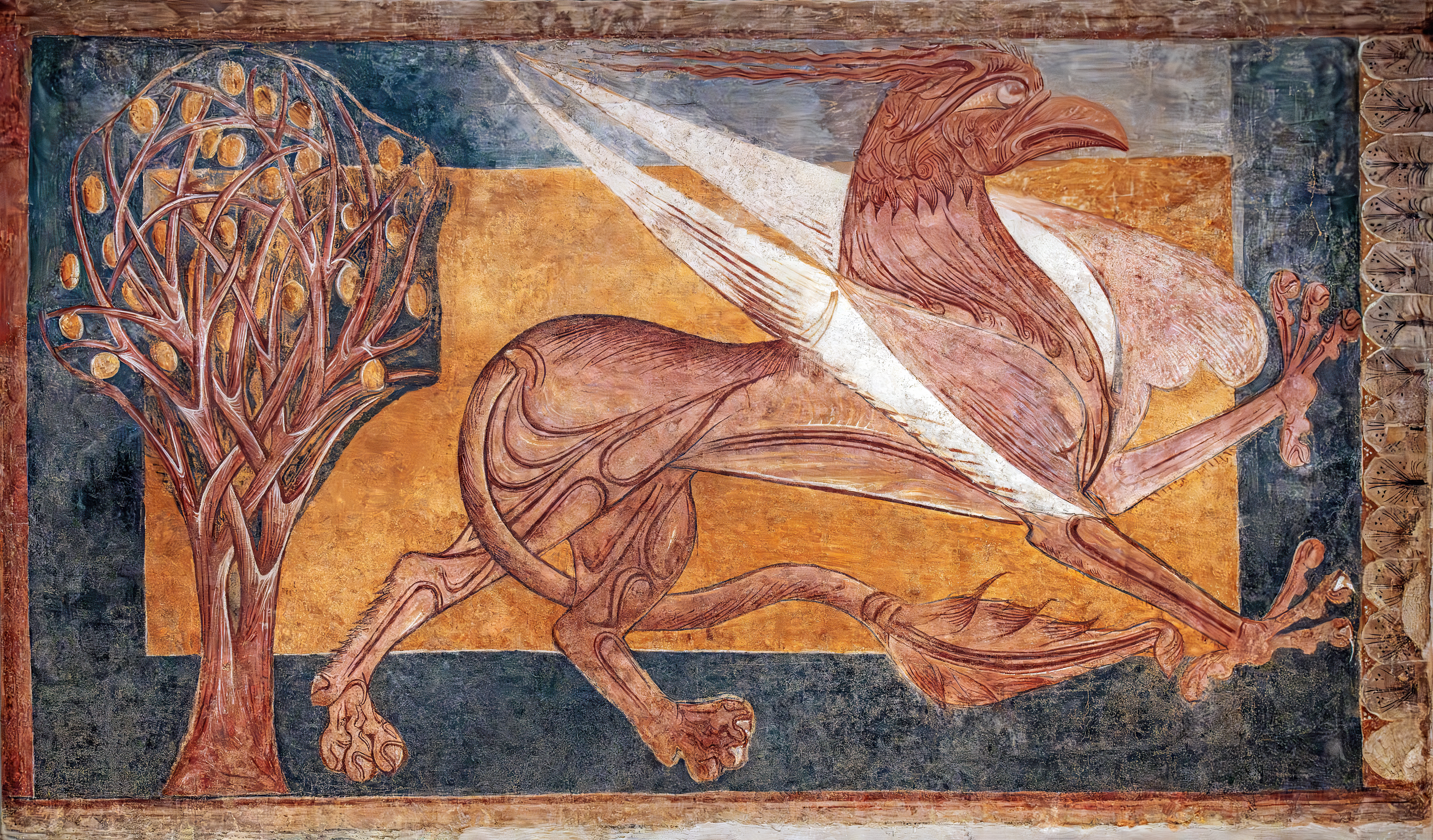
Paintings from Arlanza (from Castile and León)
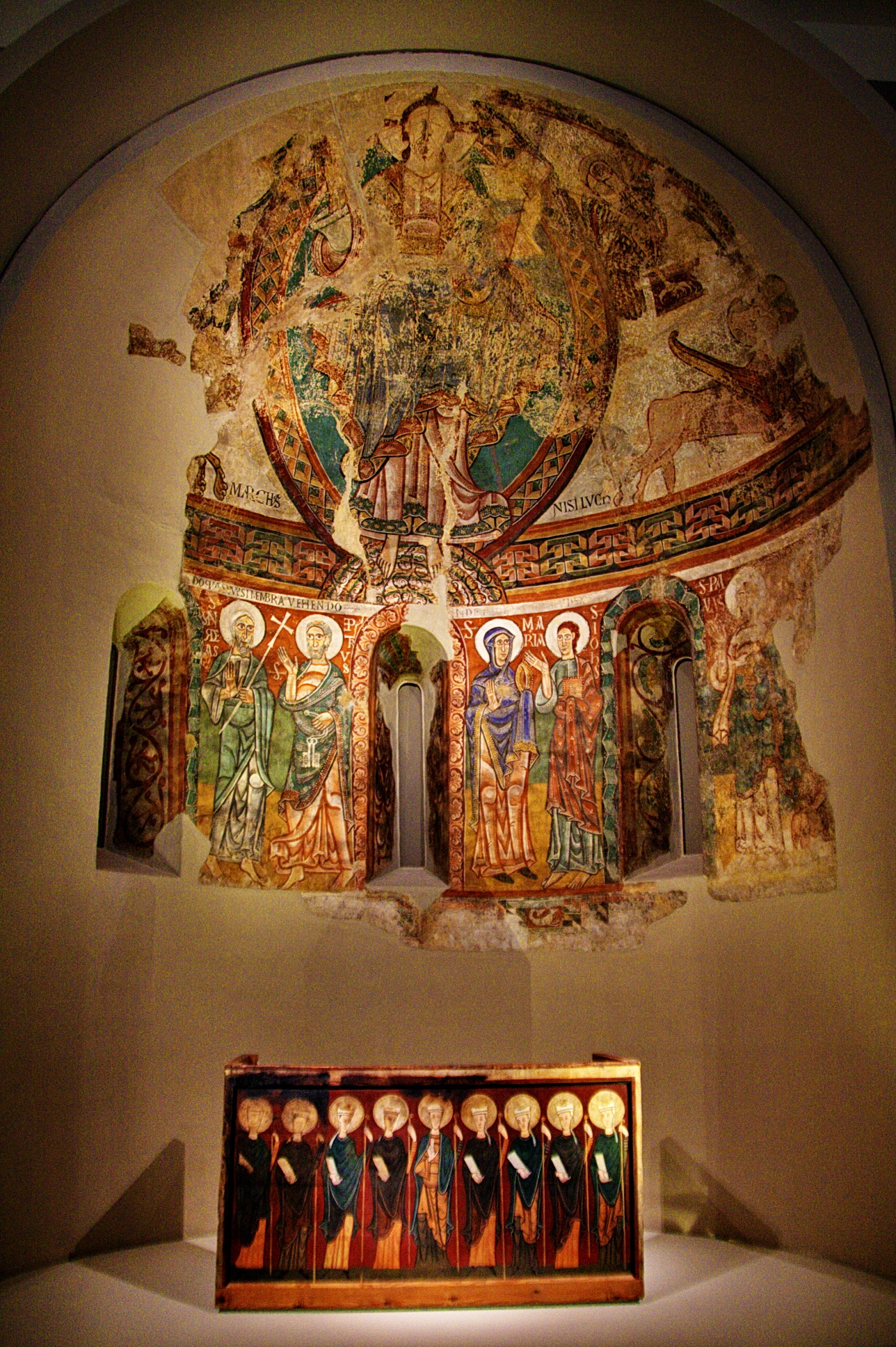
Apse of la Seu d'Urgell

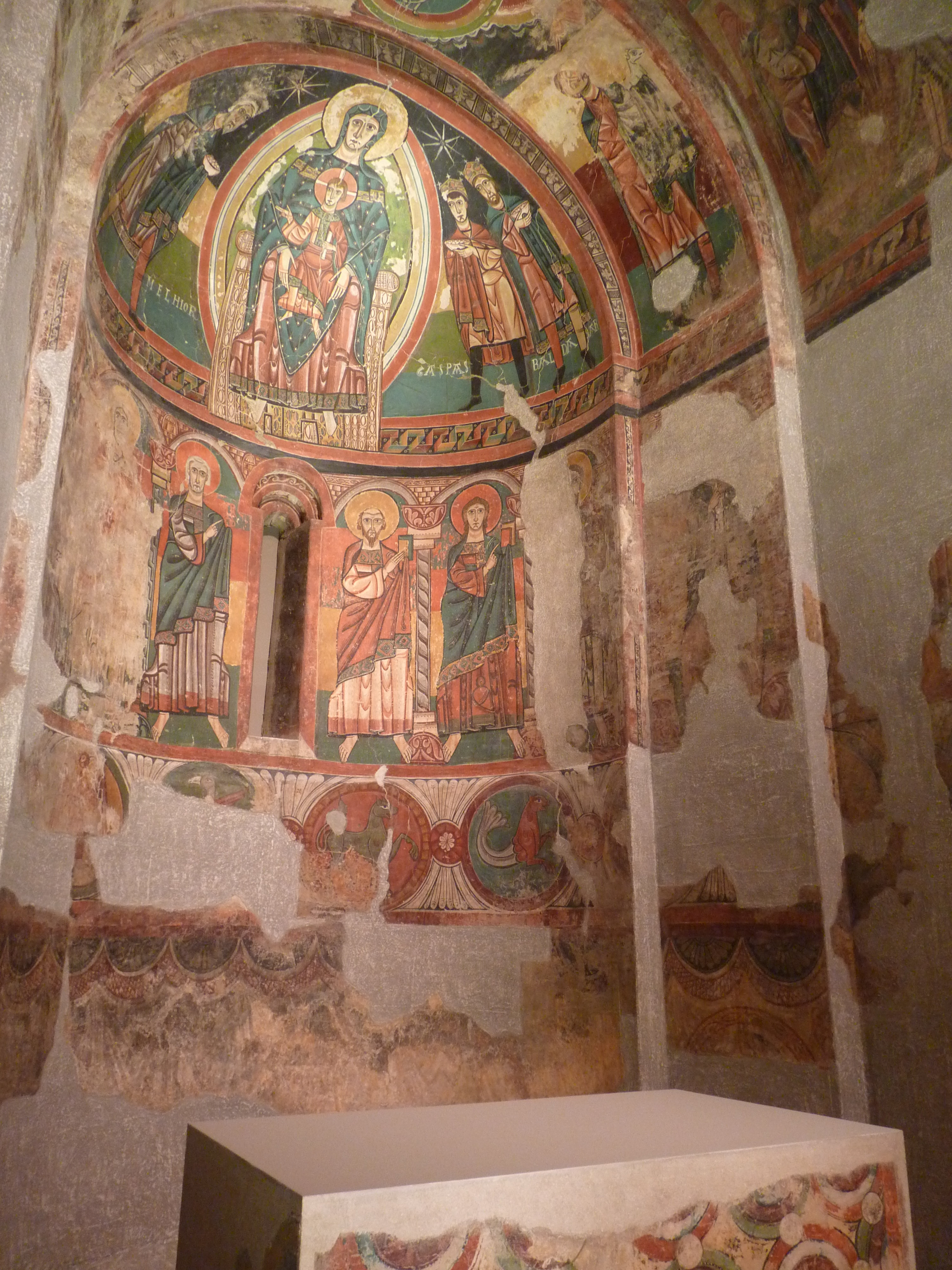
Paintings from Santa Maria in Taüll

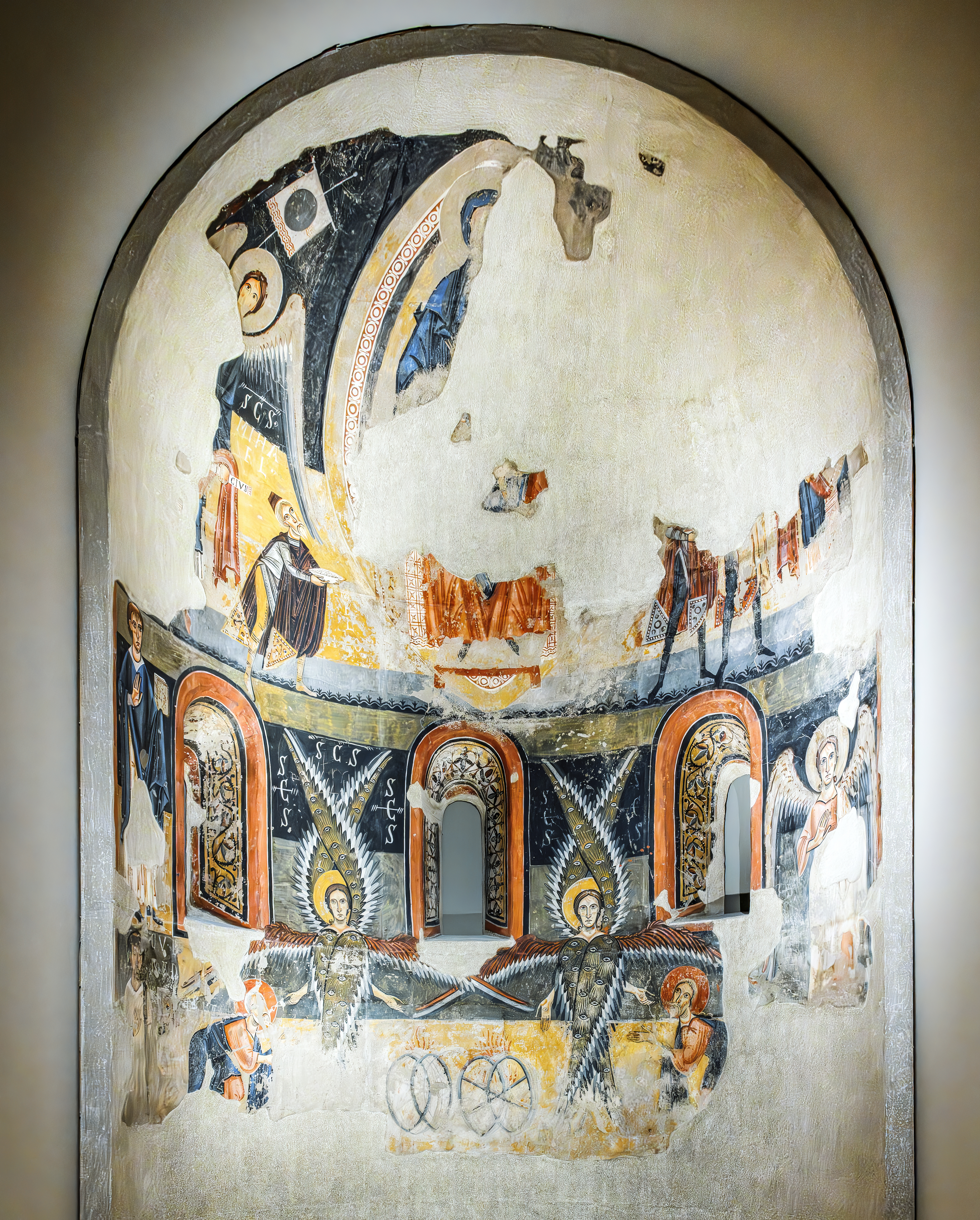
Apse of Santa Maria d'Àneu

Virgin of Ger

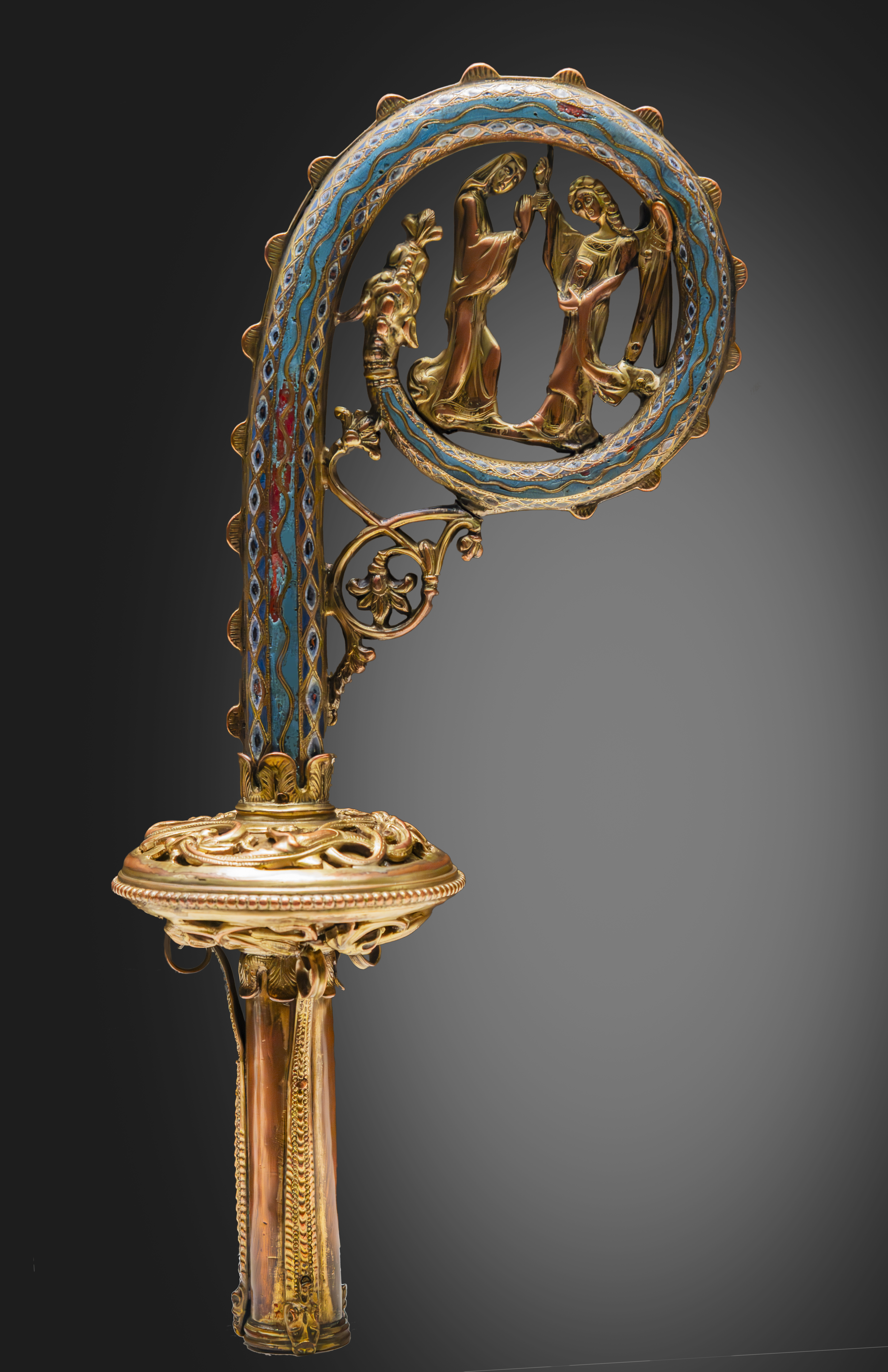
Mondoñedo Crosier (from Galicia)

=== Gothic Art Collection ===
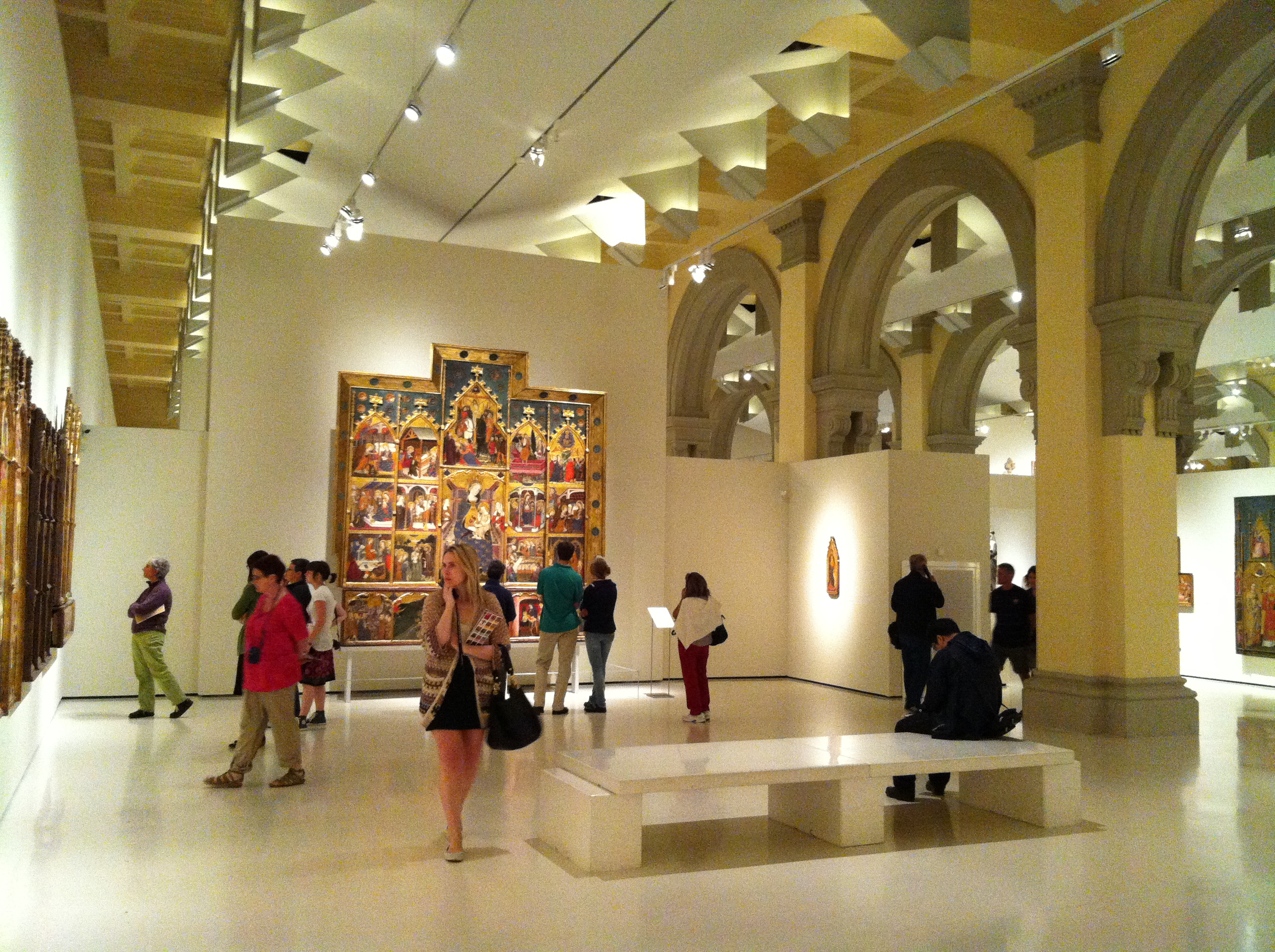
Gothic art rooms

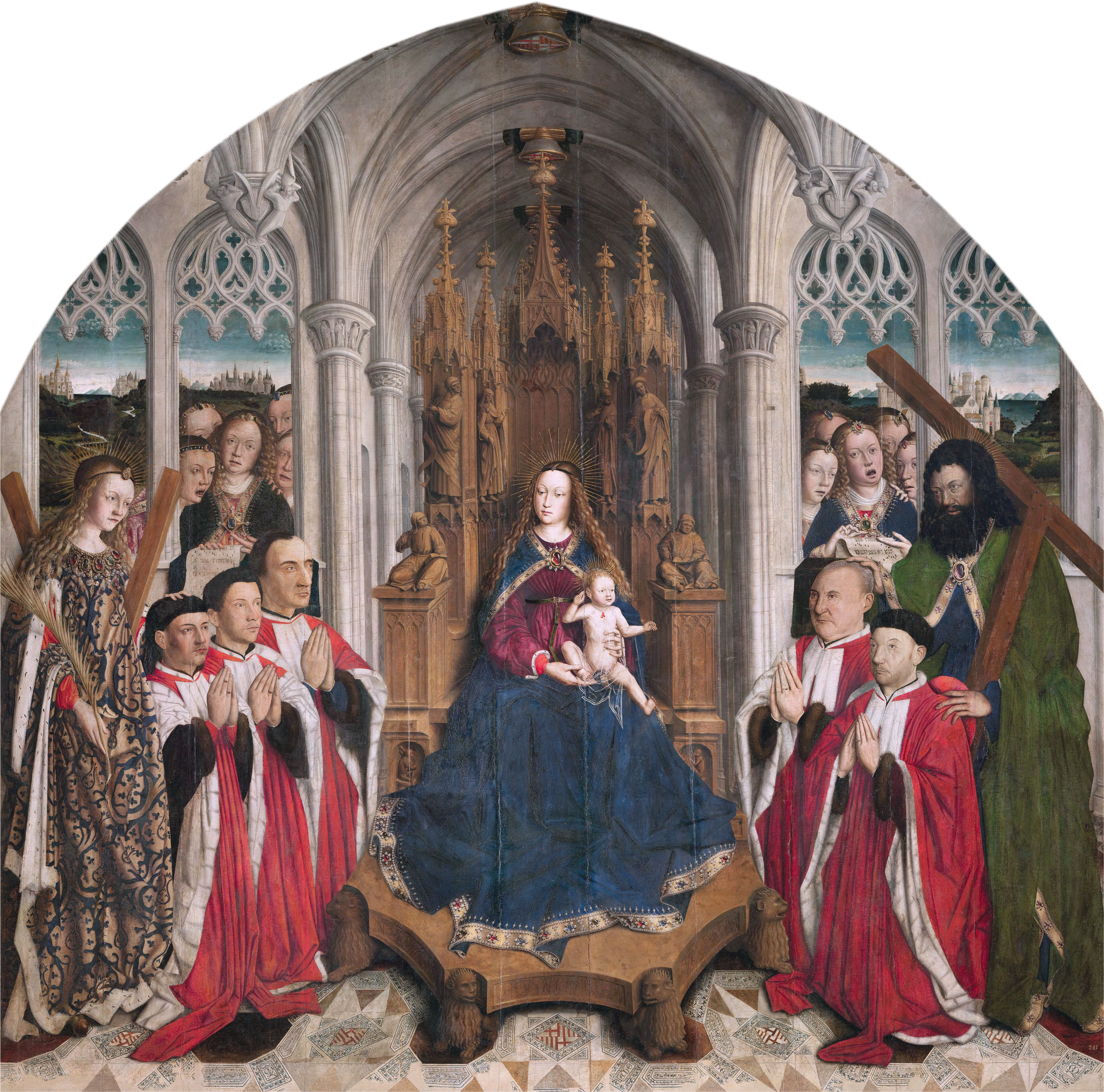
Virgin of the Consellers by Lluís Dalmau (1445)

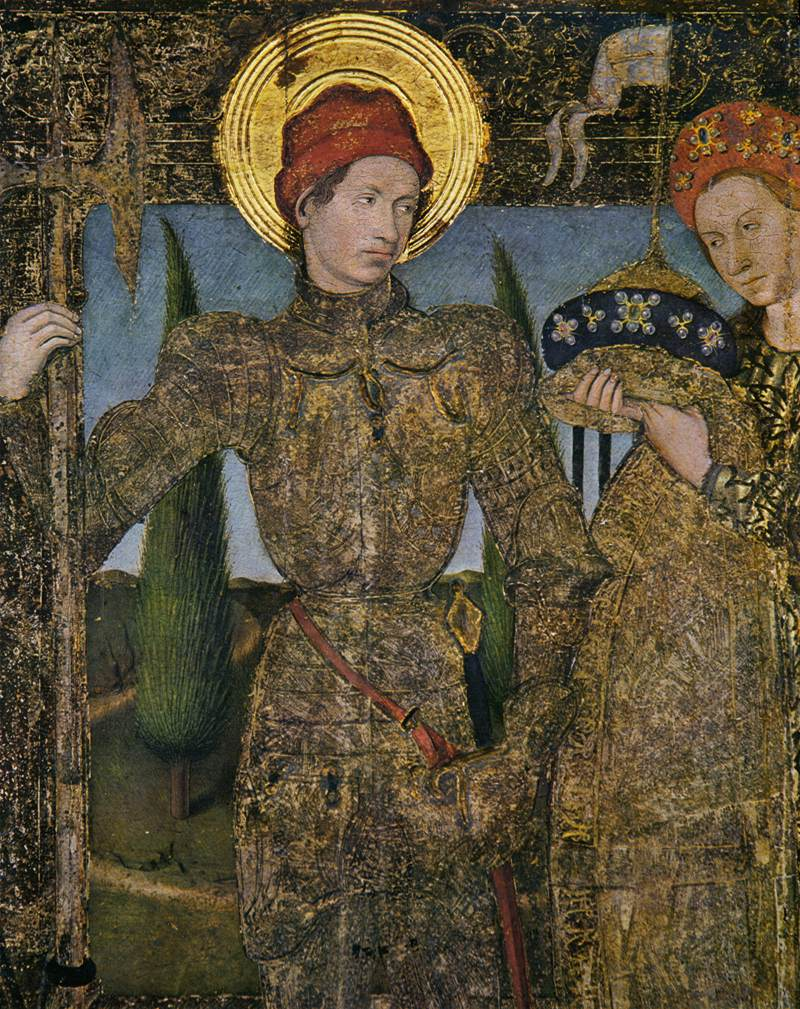
Saint George and the Princess (anon)

The Museu Nacional d'Art de Catalunya Gothic art collection began to take shape in the early decades of the 19th century, when a movement was first launched to revive and conserve the important body of Catalan heritage, which had been seriously damaged in the wave of convent burnings that took place at around the time of the disentailment of church goods in the year 1835.

The Gothic collection features a considerable number of Catalan works accompanied, moreover, by an extraordinary selection of pieces from the other territories that were once ruled by the Crown of Aragon. As a whole, this section presents a broad, representative panoramic view of Gothic art produced in the three large peninsular territories that formed part of the Crown – Catalonia, Aragon itself, and Valencia – as well as a more anecdotal selection of works from Mallorca.

The Gothic rooms display works from the late 13th, 14th and 15th centuries, arranged in chronological order, although the pieces are also grouped by school and typological affinity, and several thematic sections have been established. These include the renowned Mural paintings of the Conquest of Majorca, which preside over the first Gothic room. This same room also contains other works on profane themes or from secular sites, including elements from the enteixinats (coffered ceilings) of noble Barcelona houses to amatory caskets.

Other works in this and the following rooms, from Castile, Navarre, Aragon and Catalonia, clearly illustrate the predominance of French Gothic models, which endured until the mid-14th century, when competition was finally offered by new Italianate models. This new style, developed in the Italy of Giotto, was adopted and adapted here, working a profound transformation in painting and sculpture not only in Catalonia, but throughout the reigns forming part of the Crown of Aragon.

Besides a few Italian examples, the Museu Nacional also features an important selection of Italian, Catalan and Aragonese painting, such as the Triptych of Sant Vicenç d'Estopanyà, probably by an immigrant Italian artist, and altarpieces by the Serra brothers (the Serra family were highly influential in steering the course of Catalan painting during the closing decades of the 14th century). Sculpture during this period from the mid-14th century, was also influenced by Italian models, although the French Gothic style continued to exercise its authority. The collection includes works that may be attributed to some of the most outstanding sculptors of the time, such as Jaume Cascalls (see Head of Christ) and Bartomeu de Robió. Catalan sculpture in the late 14th century and the first half of the 15th is represented by two misericords from Barcelona Cathedral carved stalls by Pere Sanglada. From the 15th century, working in the new International Gothic style, Pere Oller and Pere Joan perhaps represent the peak of what was without doubt an important Catalan contribution to sculptural art.

Amongst Catalan painters, Lluís Borrassà, Joan Mates, Bernat Martorell, Ramon de Mur and Joan Antigó are amongst the finest exponents of International Gothic, a style that also coincided with the period when Valencia was flourishing as a centre for art. Valencia is represented in the Museu Nacional by such outstanding artists as Gonçal Peris. The Gothic collection also features examples of painting from Aragon, another region that enjoyed considerable influence at this time. The exchange of influences continued, in both directions, during the period that followed when artistic representation became more realistic, and which took its initial inspiration from Jan van Eyck: the Valencian artist Lluís Dalmau painted the universally acclaimed Virgin of the Consellers whilst the Catalan Joan Reixac – whose work is well represented at the Museu Nacional – directed the most prolific workshop in Valencia. It was also after a period in Valencia that Jaume Huguet, the great Catalan painter working in the second half of the 15th century, made his residence definitively in Barcelona, establishing his dominance and setting up a school there. Complementing a generous selection of Huguet's works, the Museu Nacional d'Art de Catalunya also contains examples from artists active during the same period, such as Pere Garcia de Benavarri, who worked in both Aragon and Catalonia and created another successful formula based on similar cultural components.

Besides this central strain in autochthonous painting, the panorama of Gothic art also features various other important episodes, such as the time spent by Antoine de Lonhy in Barcelona, or the later, longer residence in the Catalan capital of the Cordoban artist Bartolomé Bermejo, who had previously worked in Valencia and Aragon. This journey through the late 15th century continues with such Castilian painters as Fernando Gallego, along with others from Aragon, as Martín Bernat or Miguel Ximénez, and Valencia, principally Rodrigo de Osona. Finally, mention the remarkable series of the organ shutters from the Cathedral of la Seu d'Urgell, painted at the end of the 20th century by an artist from Perpignan who is known by various names, including that of the Master of La Seu d'Urgell.

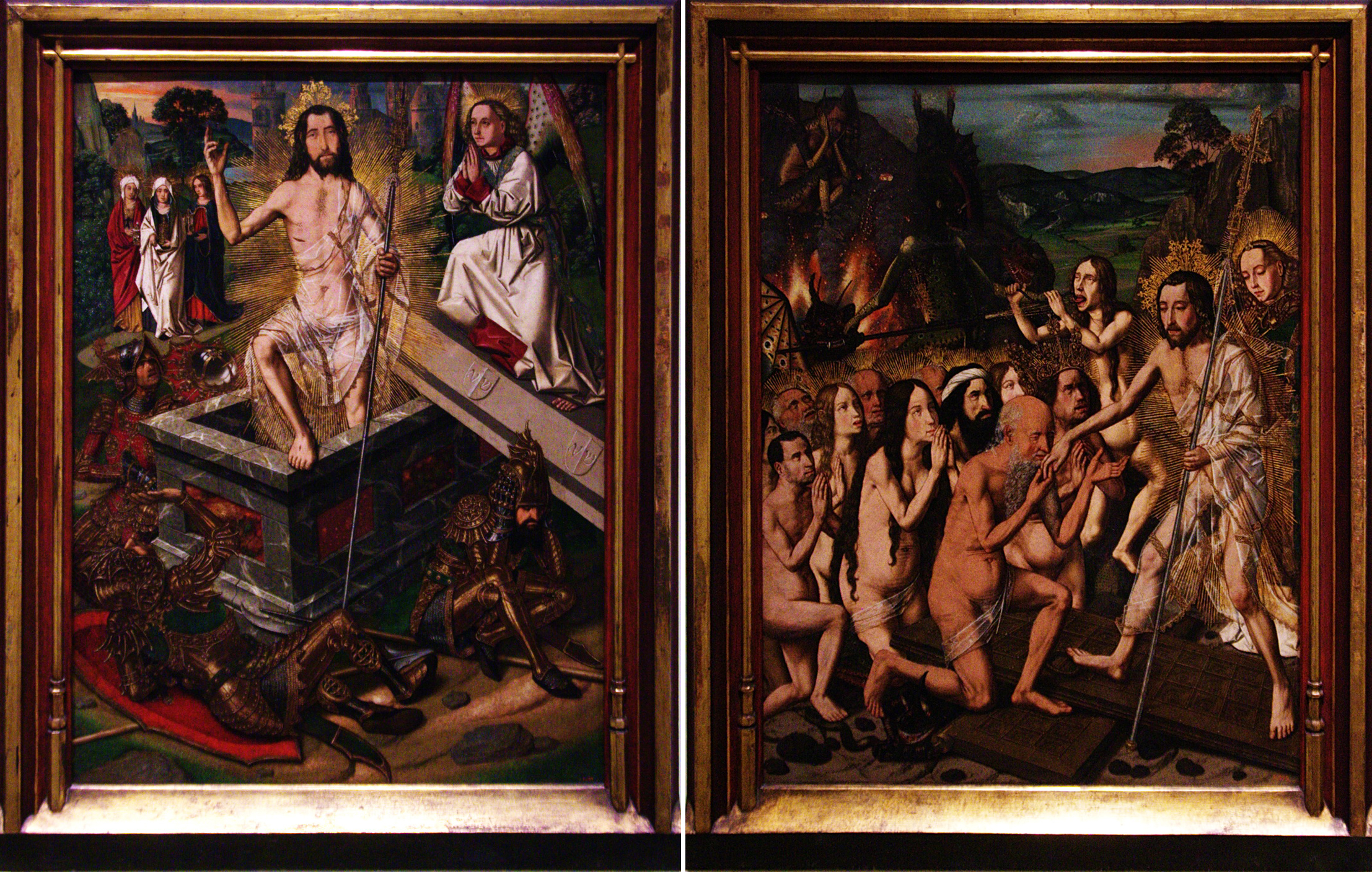
Bartolomé Bermejo (Córdoban painter) – Resurrection and Descent of Christ into Limbo

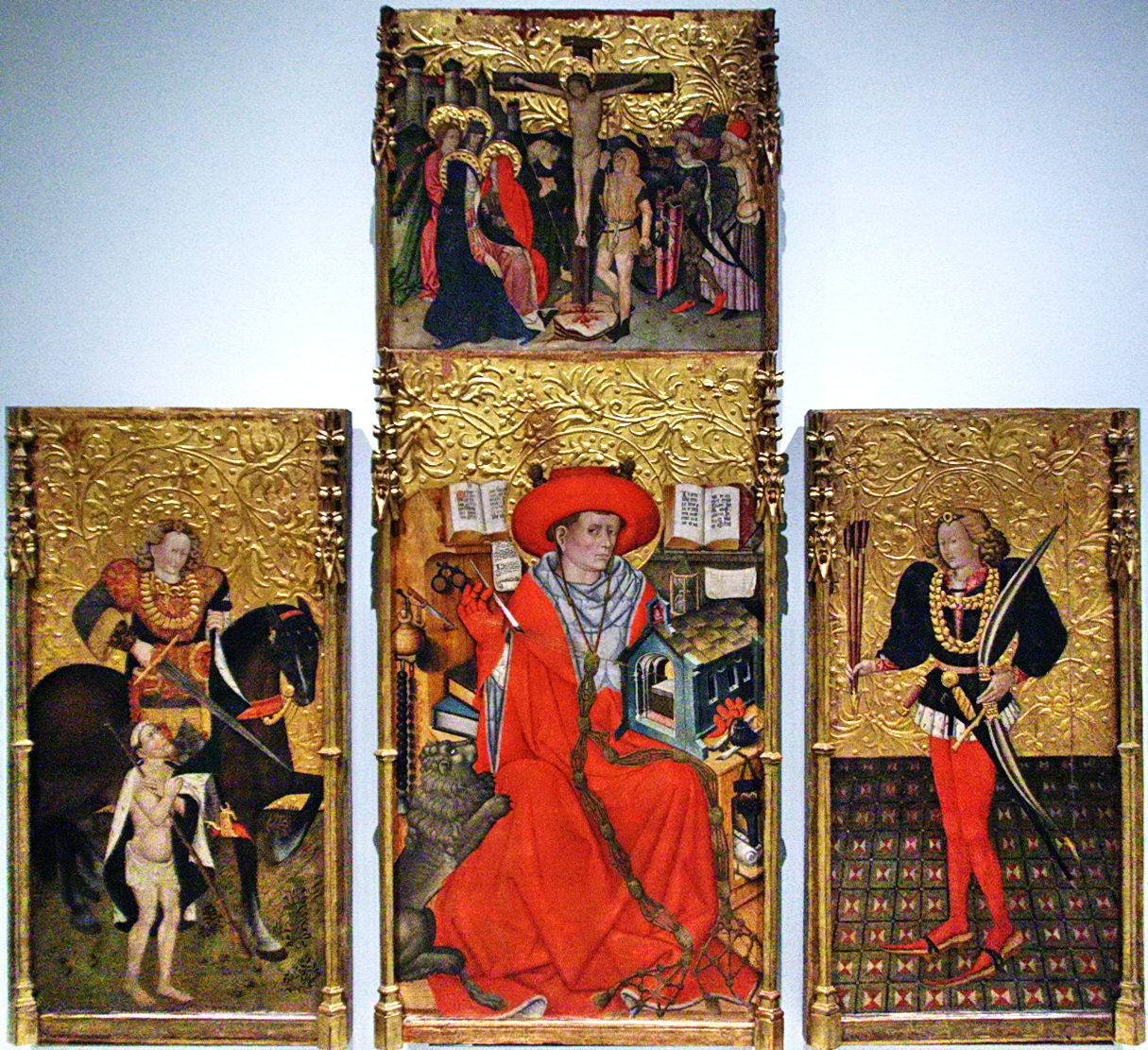
Jaume Ferrer II – Saint Jerome, Saint Martin of Tours, Saint Sebastian and the Calvary

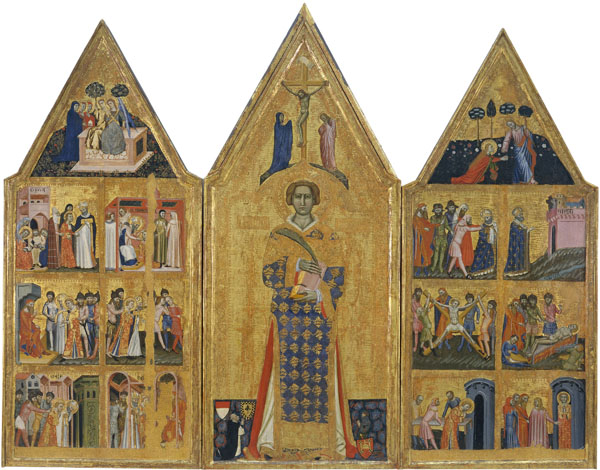
Master of Estopanyà – Altarpiece of Saint Vincent

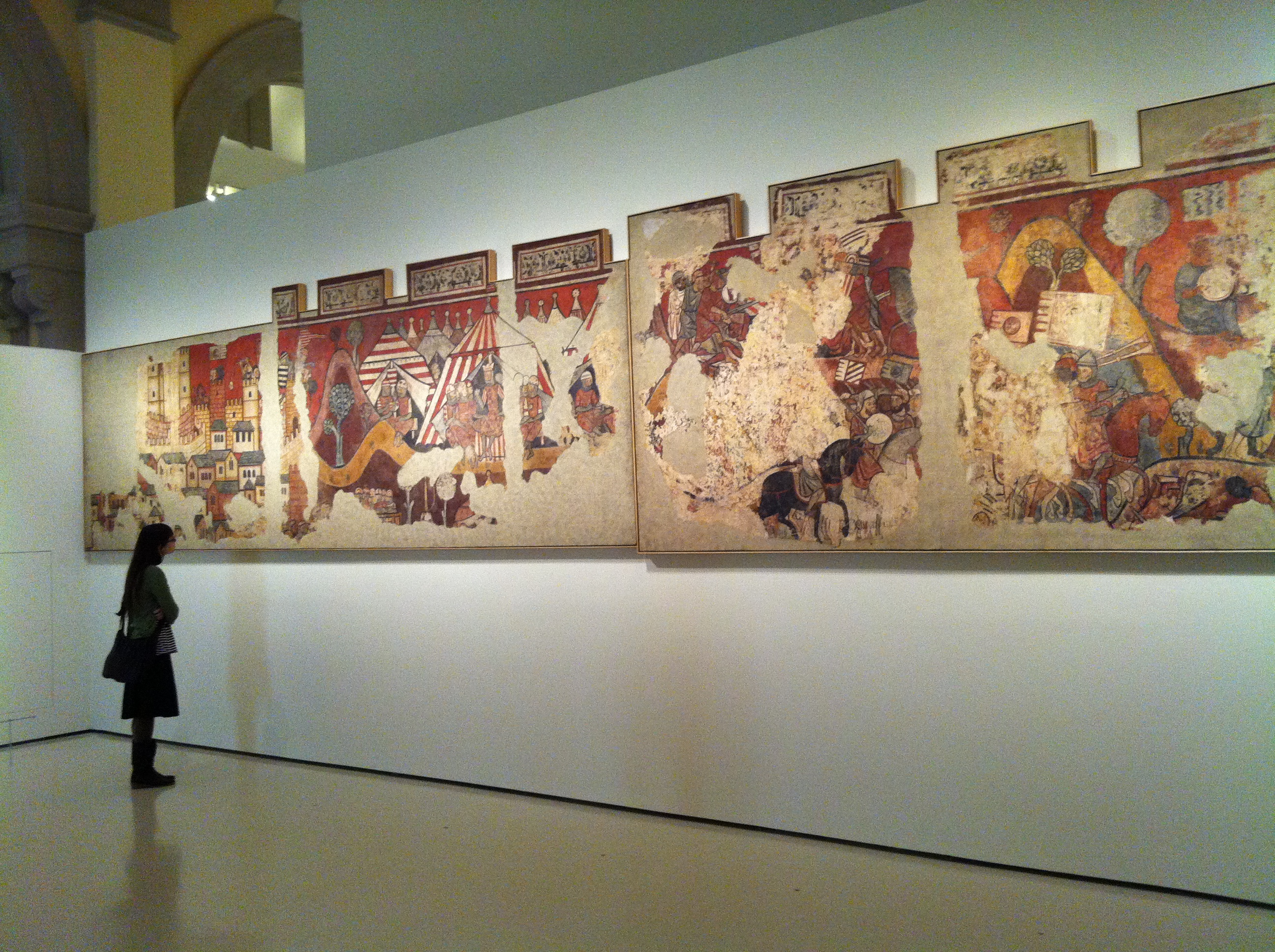
Master of the Conquest of Majorca – Mural paintings of the Conquest of Majorca

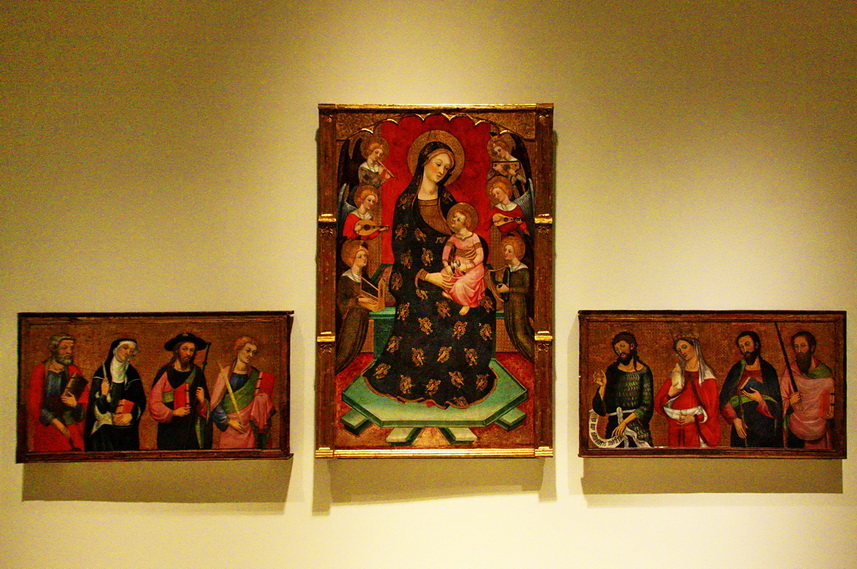
Pere Serra – Virgin of the Angels
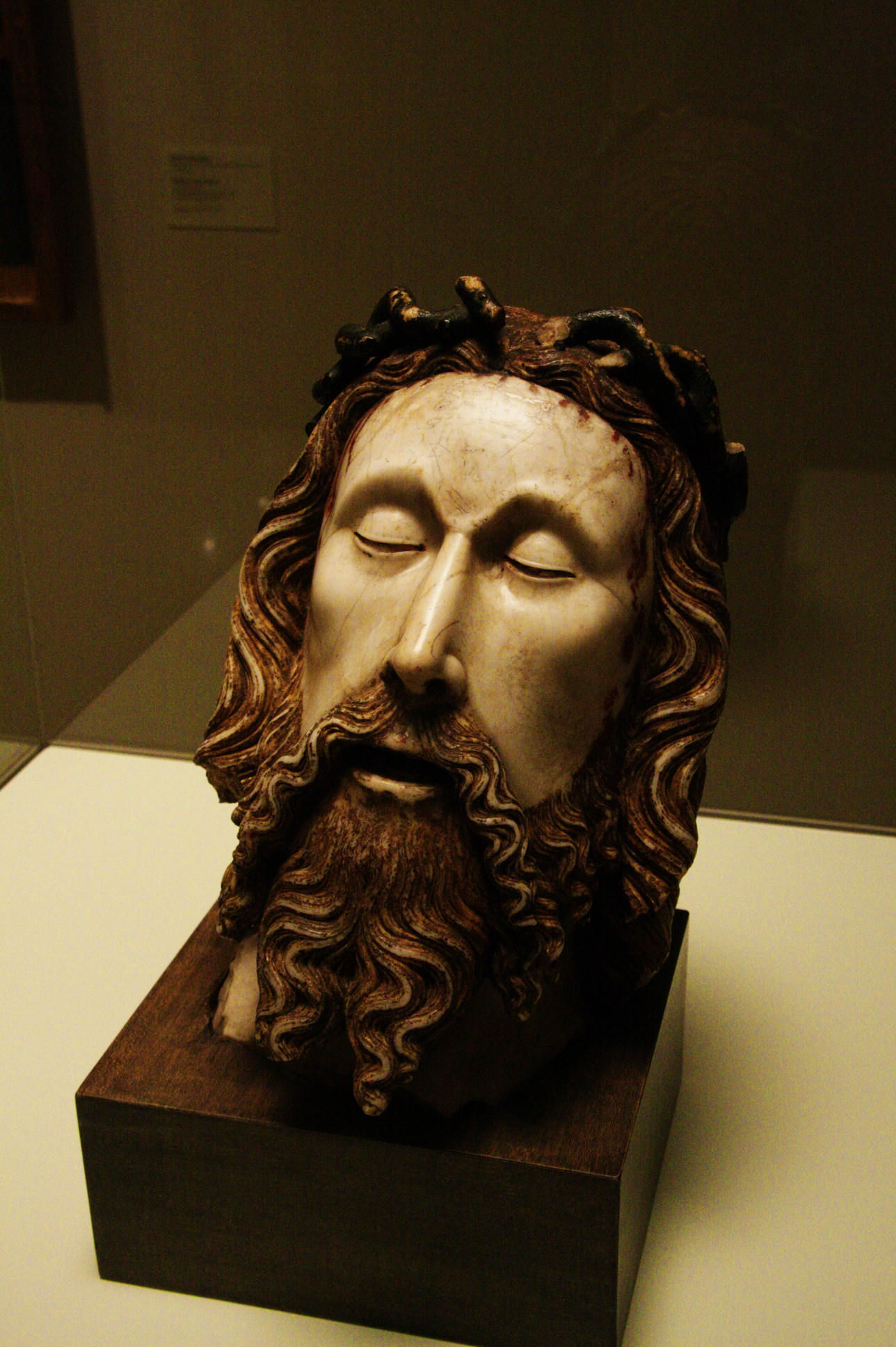
Jaume Cascalls – Head of Christ

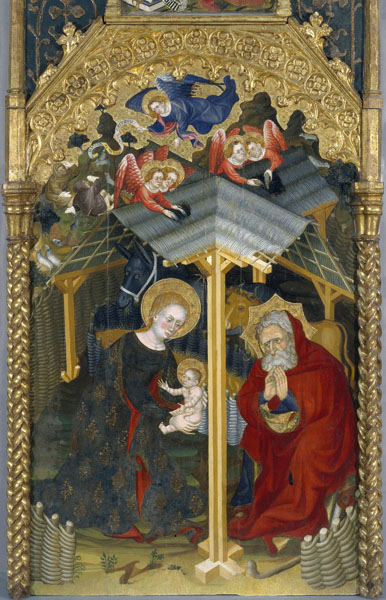
Guerau Gener and Lluís Borrassà – Gothic altarpiece of Santes Creus

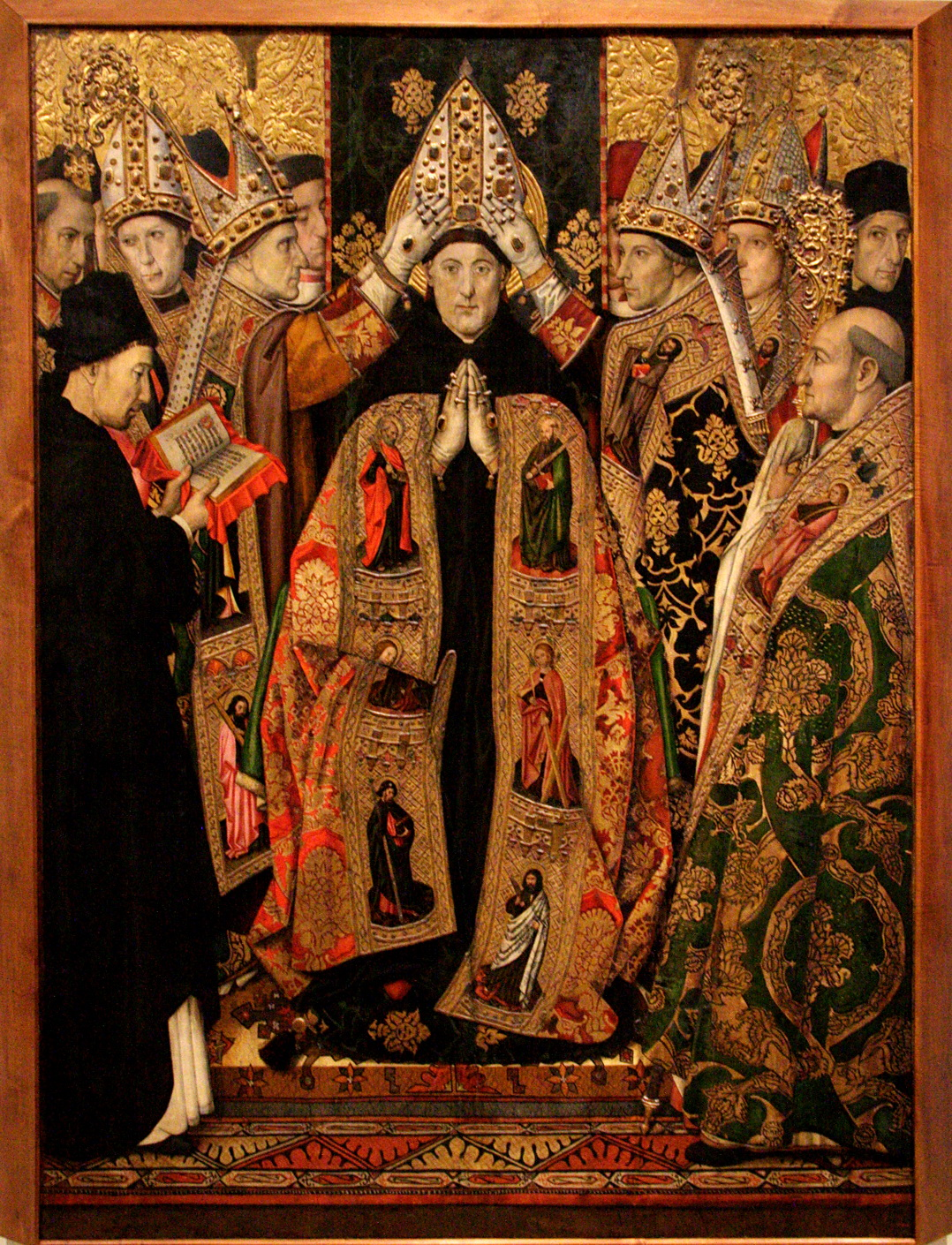
Jaume Huguet – The Consecration of Saint Augustine

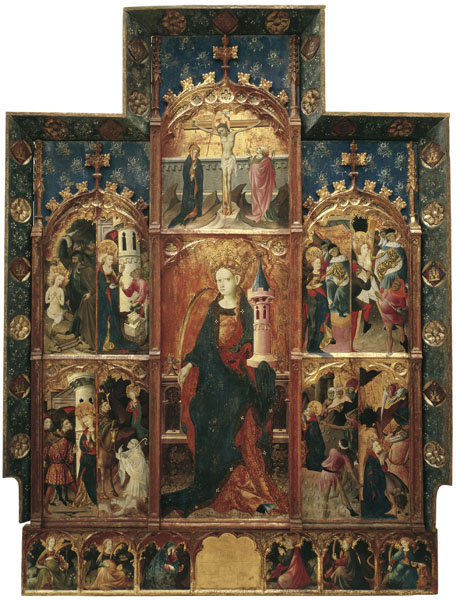
Gonçal Peris – Altarpiece of Saint Barbara (from Puertomingalvo town, Aragon)

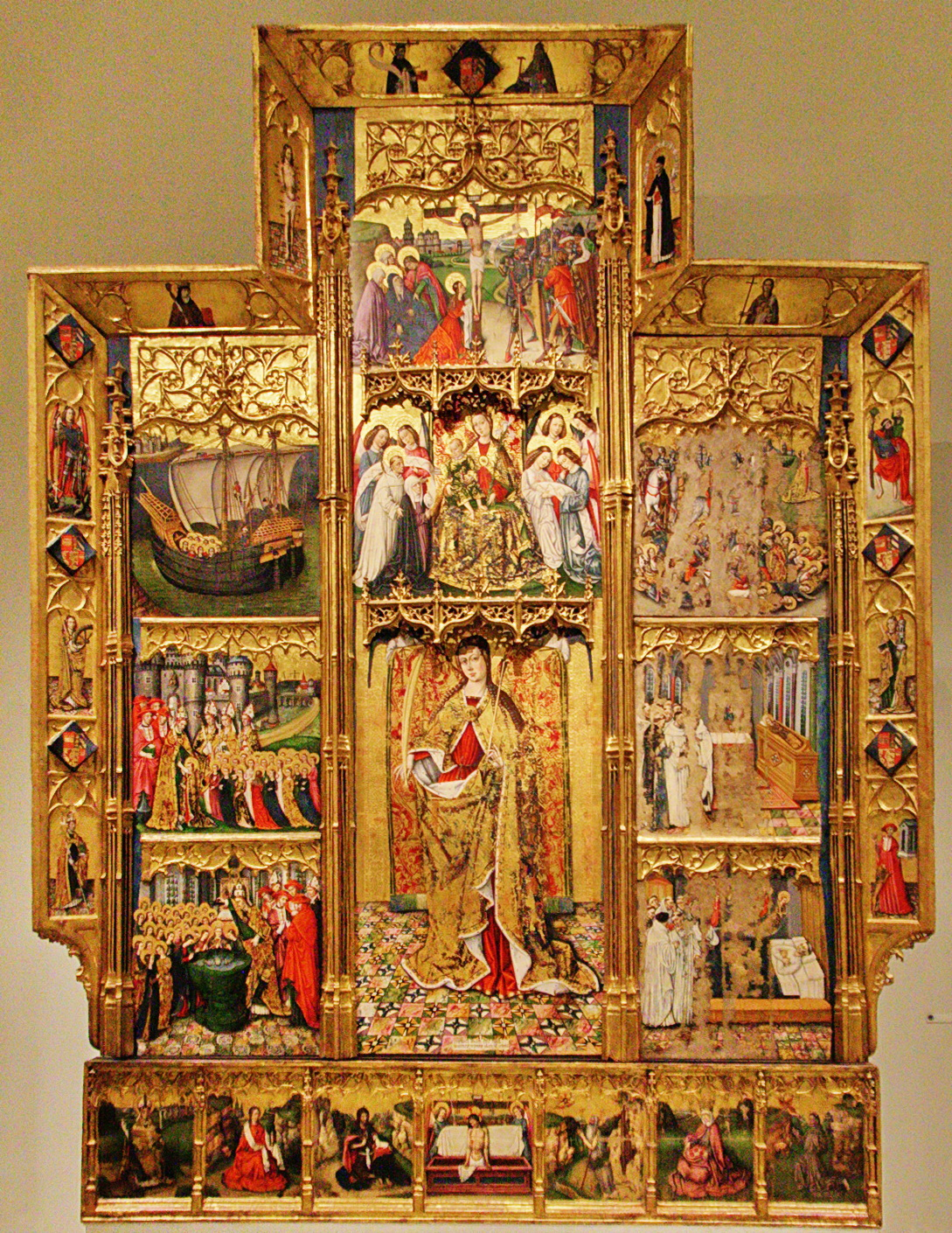
Joan Reixac – Altarpiece of Saint Ursula and the Eleven Thousand Virgins

=== Renaissance and Baroque Art Collection ===
The Museu Nacional d'Art de Catalunya Renaissance and baroque art collection comprises pieces of priceless cultural heritage that – unlike the collections at other great national museums in Europe, which were generally built up from royal and aristocratic collections – was established in Catalonia through the acquisition of local pieces and later complemented by donations and acquisitions from private galleries.

The itinerary begins with art from the Low Countries in the 16th century, in which religious fervour is mixed with detailed depiction of everyday life, as can be seen in the superb collection of panels and triptychs commissioned for private use. In Catalonia during the early Renaissance period, the Gothic forms are found alongside other, new stylistic solutions, as exemplified, for instance, in St Candidus, by Ayne Bru or St Blaise, by Pere Fernández, works imbued with the humanist feeling and influenced by the modern composition theories that were then emerging in Italy. In the Altarpiece of St Eligius of the Silversmiths, Pere Nunyes clearly shows the influence of this new language, as does the sculptor Damià Forment in his interpretation of the Apostles for the Dormition of the Virgin. Towards the end of the 16th century, Spanish painting produced many works of outstanding beauty, such as El Greco's The Bearing of the Cross and St Peter and St Paul, enriched by modern use of colour, the fruit of the lessons the artist had learned in Venice. In this age, the Ecce Homo, Luis de Morales, a contemporary of El Greco, Jacopo Tintoretto or The Bassano, masterfully conveyed the devotional spirit of the Counter-Reformation.

The 17th century begins with the frescoes in the Herrera Chapel by Annibale Carracci and collaborators, who decorated the Church of San Giacomo degli Spagnuoli in Rome, and continues with works by other Italian artists such as the Neapolitans Massimo Stanzione and Andrea Vaccaro. However, standing out above all these are the masterpieces from the masters of the Spanish Golden Age, such as the Martyrdom of Saint Bartholomew by José de Ribera, known as Lo Spagnoletto, St Paul, by Diego Velázquez, and the Immaculate Conception and several still lifes by Francisco de Zurbarán. Returning to Catalonia, in his image of St Cajetan, the sculptor Andreu Sala reveals himself to be a worthy follower of the Italian genius Bernini.

Entering now the 18th century, Antoni Viladomat's series of canvases devoted to the Life of St Francis, which decorated the main cloister of the former monastery of the Friars Minor in Barcelona, constitutes the only complete set of scenes from monastic life preserved in a museum. Finally, heralding the art forms that would develop in the 19th century, the daring works of Francesc Pla, known as El Vigatà, illustrate the painterly freedom taken when decorating the interiors of seigniorial mansions belonging to the new, wealthy classes who had made their fortunes in trade and industry.

The collection, which reflects the taste of certain sections of society for Renaissance and Baroque art, features (exceptionally, if compared to the rest of the Museu Nacional collections) art produced not only in Catalonia, but also in the rest of Spain, Italy and Flanders, providing an overview of the development of European art during this period. Two later donations made important contributions to this more general vision: the Cambó Bequest and the Thyssen-Bornemisza Collection.

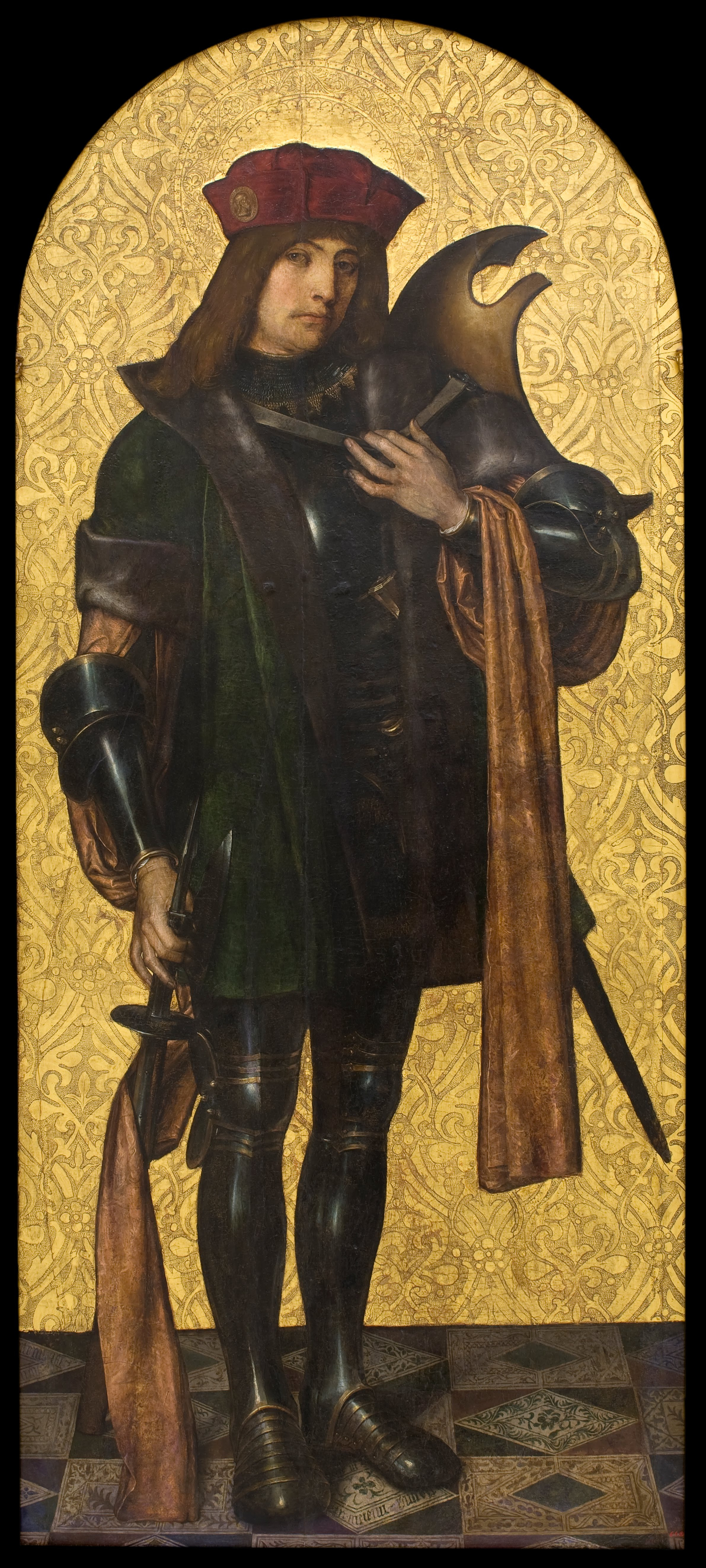
Ayne Bru – Saint Candidus

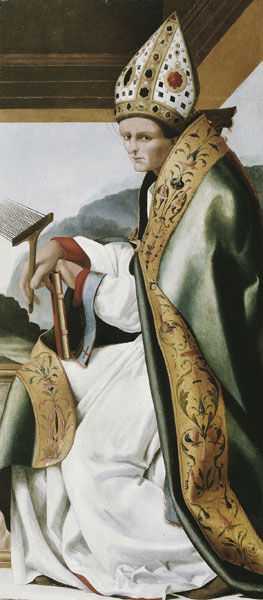
Pere Fernández – Saint Blaise

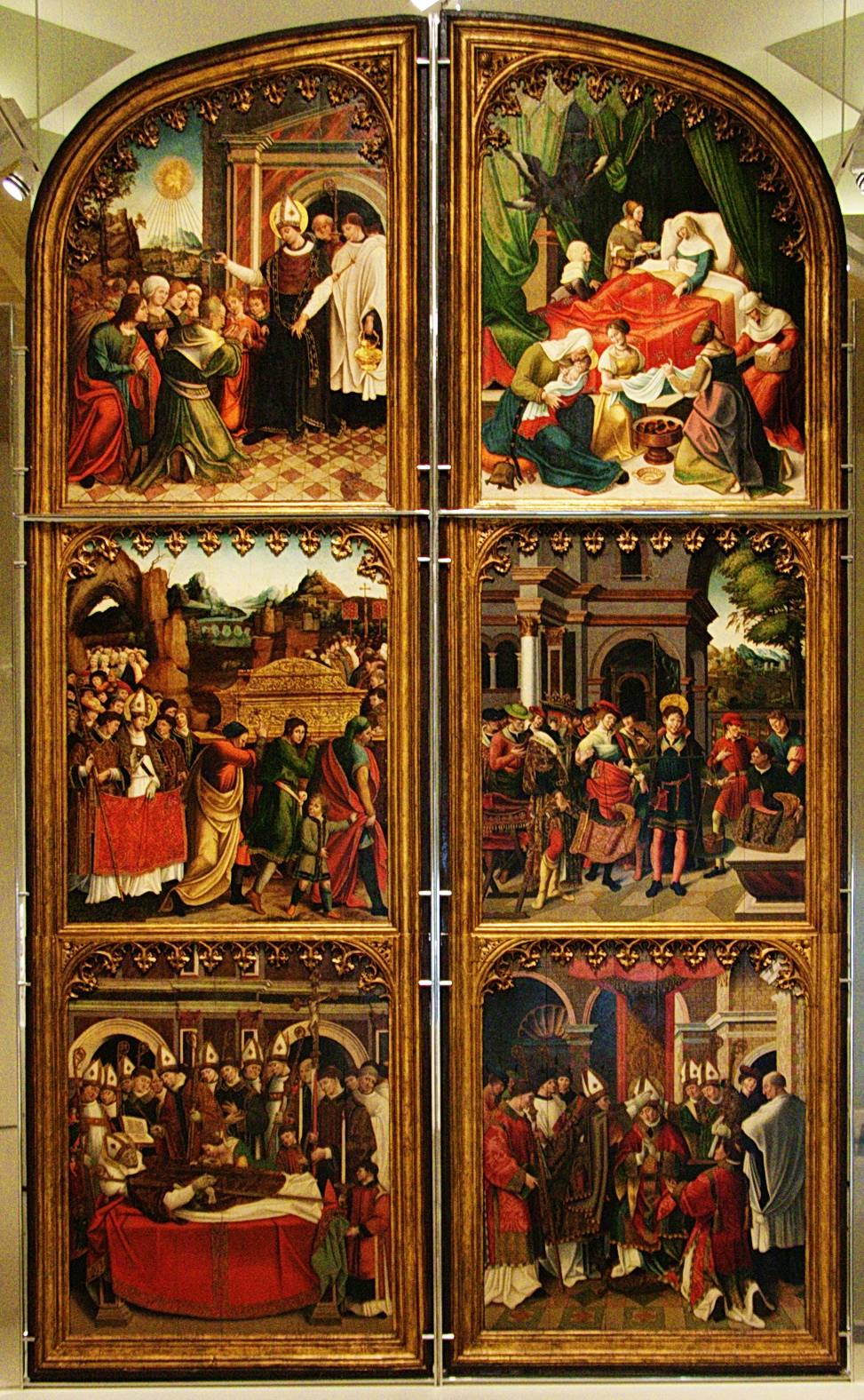
Pere Nunyes – Altarpiece of St Elgius of the Silversmiths

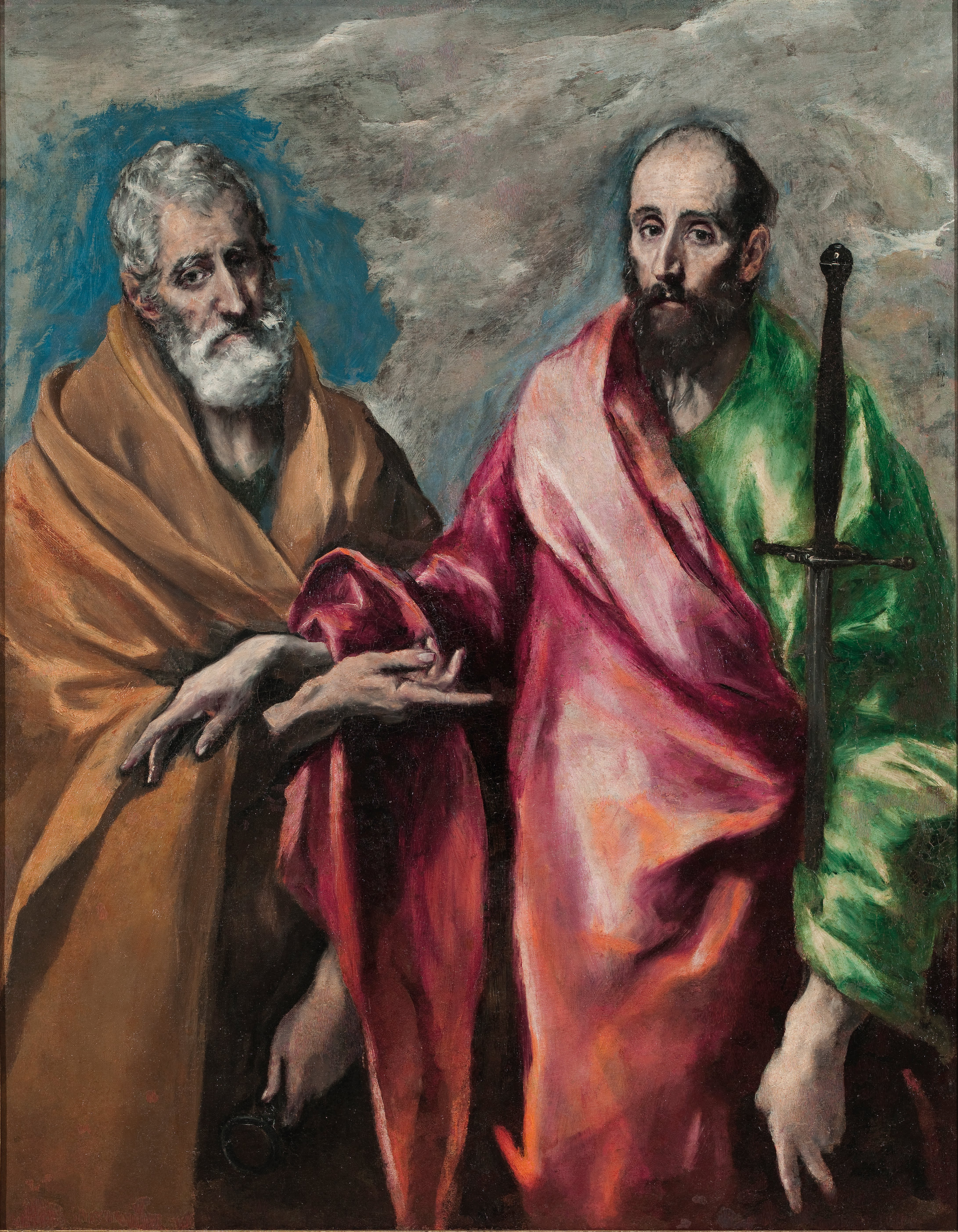
el Greco – Saint Peter and Saint Paul

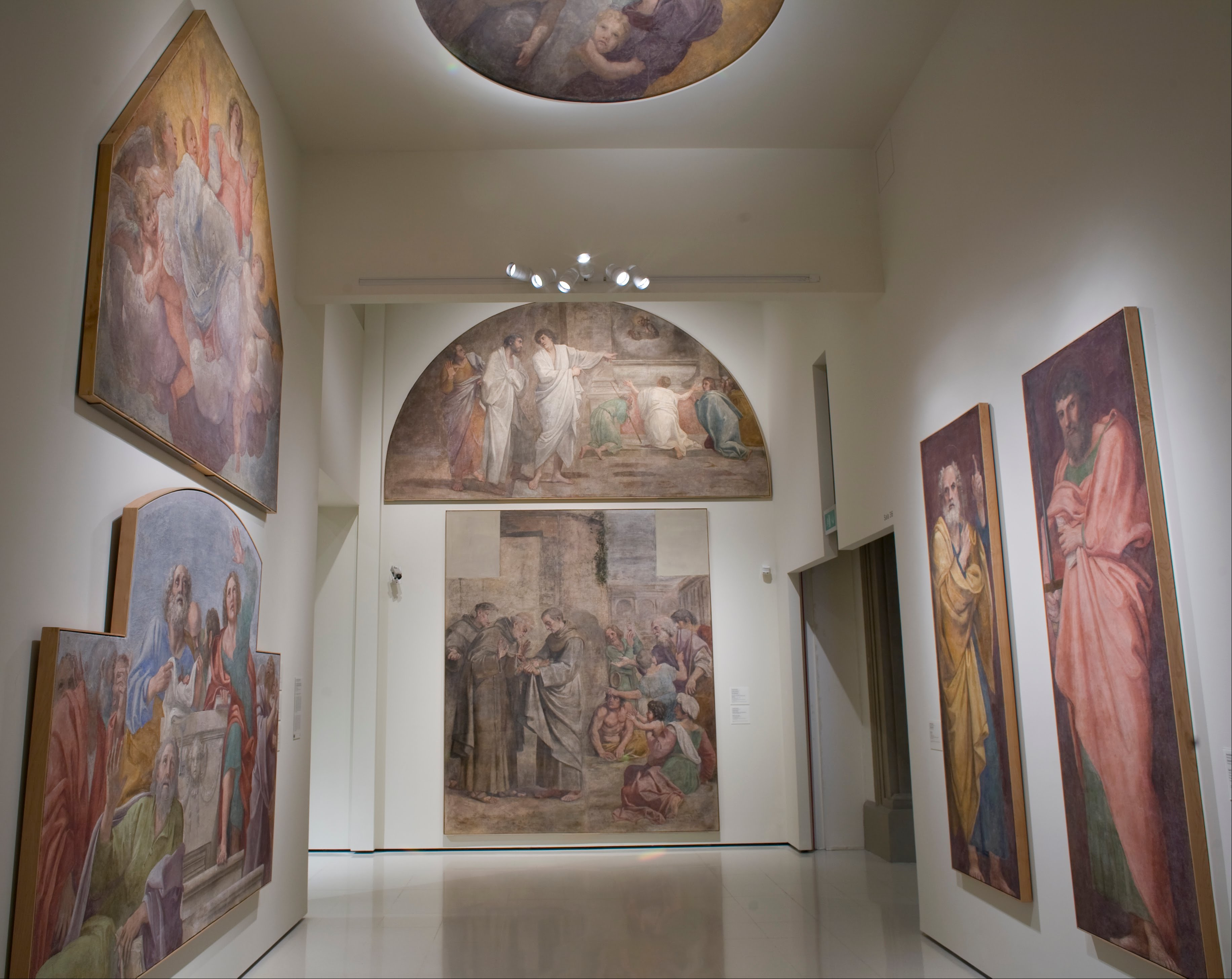
Annibale Carracci et al.- Mural Paintings from the Herrera Chapel

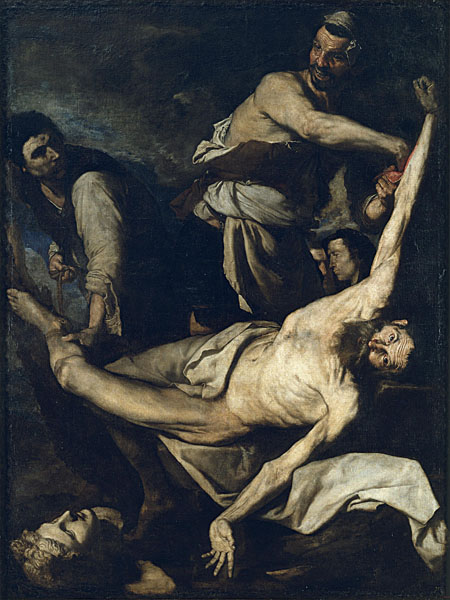
Josep de Ribera – Martyrdom of Saint Bartholomew

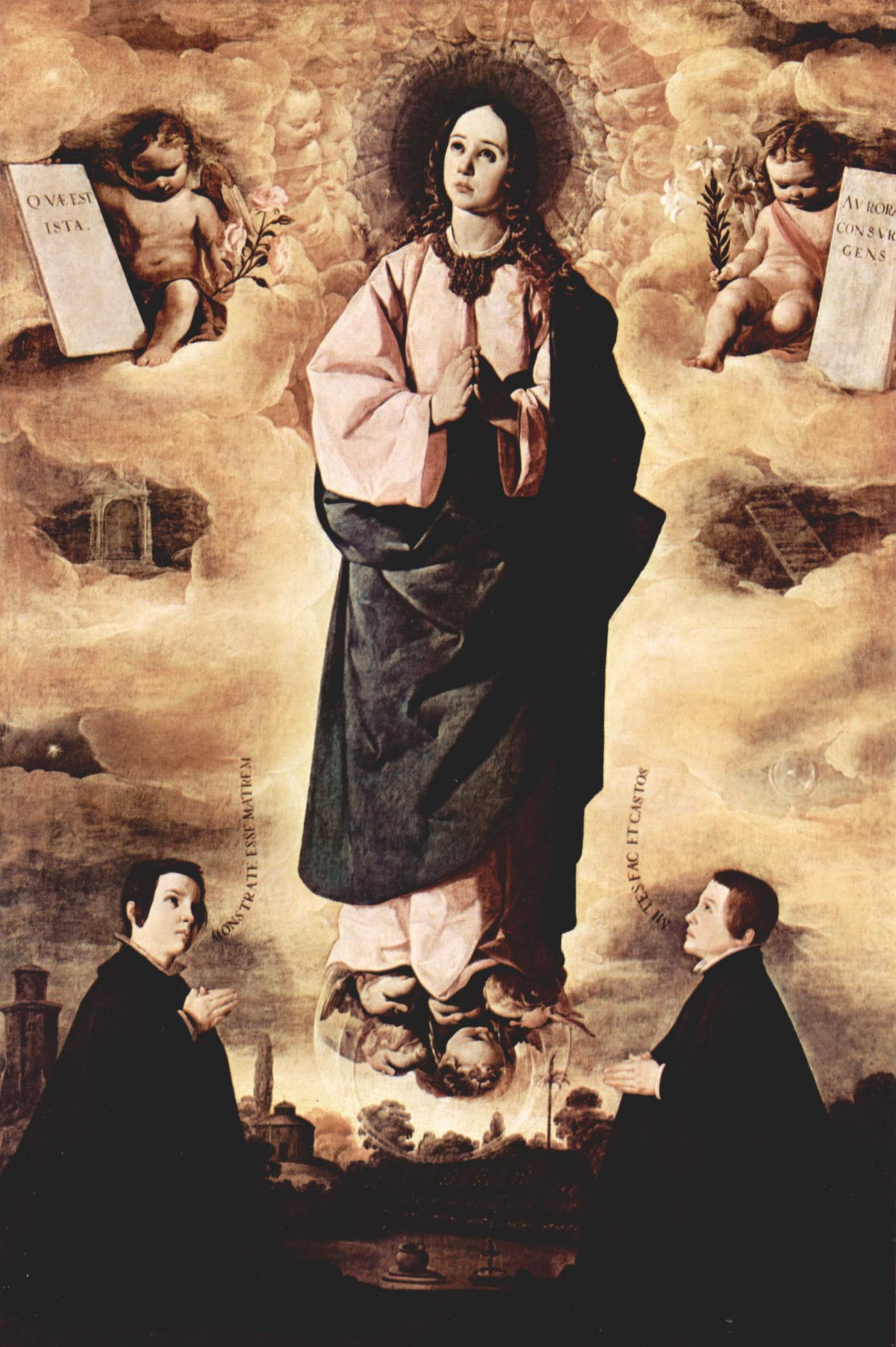
Francisco de Zurbarán – Immaculate Conception

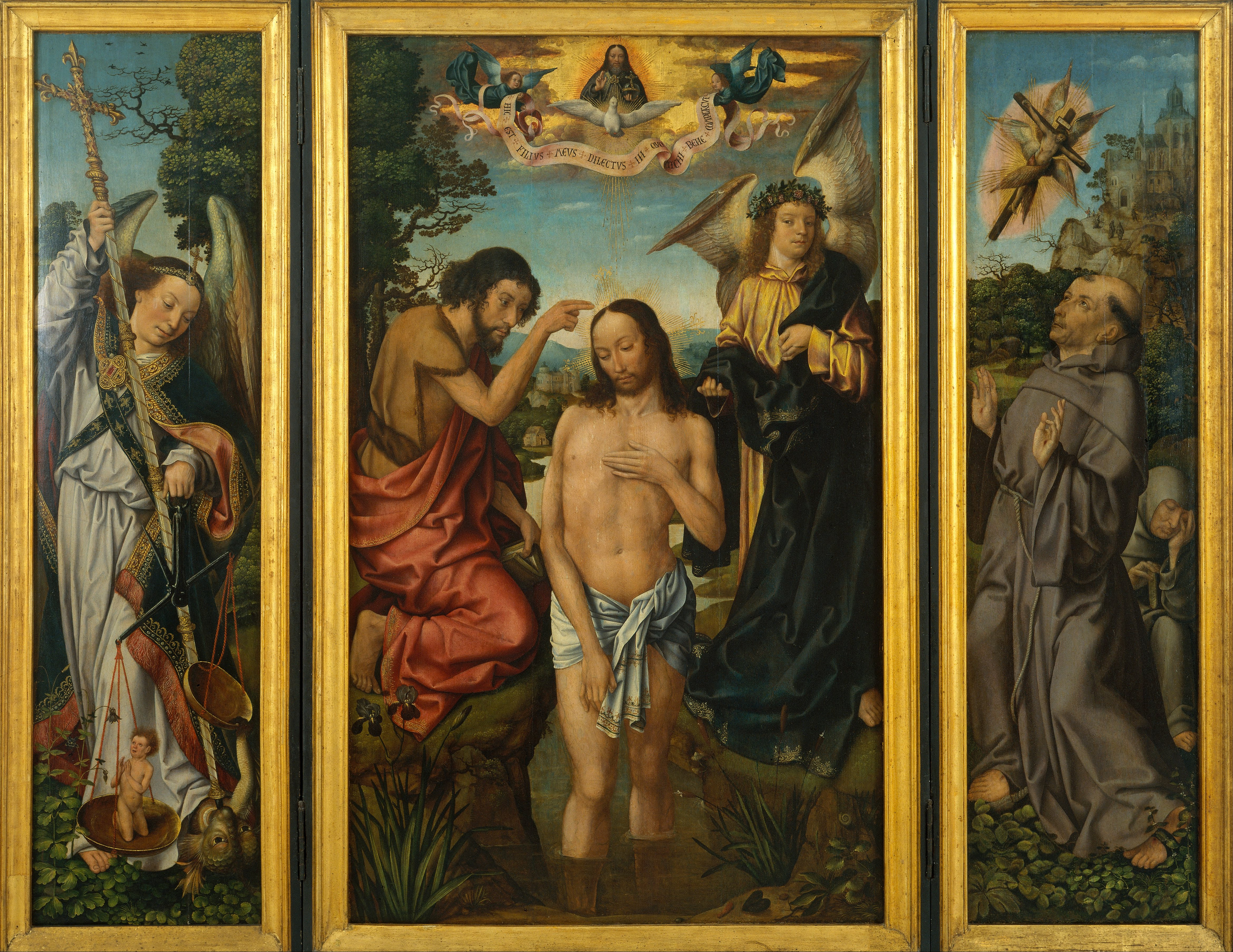
Master of Frankfurt – Triptych of the Baptism of Christ

==== The Cambó Bequest ====
The Cambó Bequest forms a collection of paintings embraces European painting history from the 14th to the early 20th century. It includes representative works of the Gothic and Renaissance periods, together with pieces that illustrate the perfection of the Italian Quattrocento, the sensuality of the great Venetian masters of the Cinquecento, the rising economic prosperity of the Low Countries in the 16th and 17th centuries and the magnificence of the Spanish Golden Age, without forgetting the richness of European Rococo. The artists represented at the Museu Nacional, thanks to this distinguished collection, include many outstanding, universally known names: great Italian painters such as Sebastiano dal Piombo, Tiziano Vecellio (Titian) and Giandomenico Tiepolo; superb exponents of the Flemish School in the form of Peter Paul Rubens and Lucas Cranach; Jean-Honoré Fragonard and Maurice Quentin de la Tour and their French rococo works; and, finally, Francisco de Goya, whose revolutionary genius rounds off the artistic journey embraced by the Cambó Bequest.

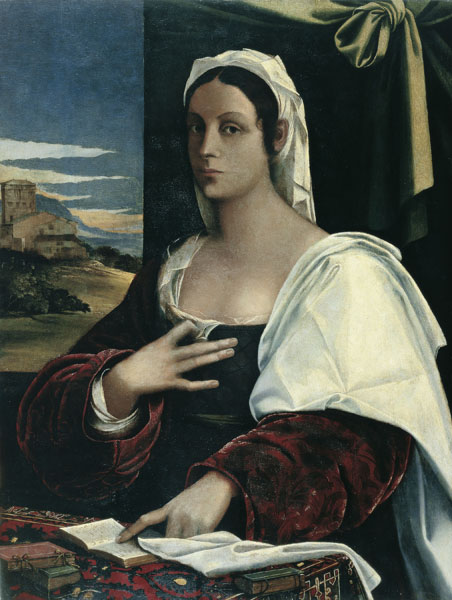
Sebastiano del Piombo – Vittoria Colonna (?)

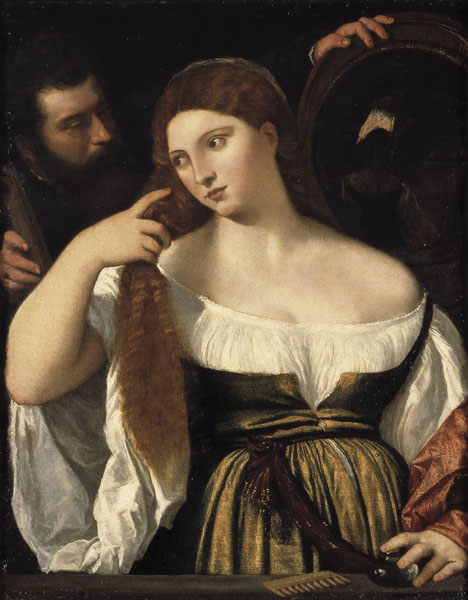
Tiziano Vecellio and workshop – Girl Before the Mirror

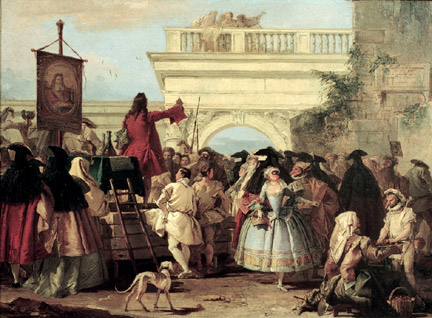
Giandomenico Tiepolo – The Charlatan

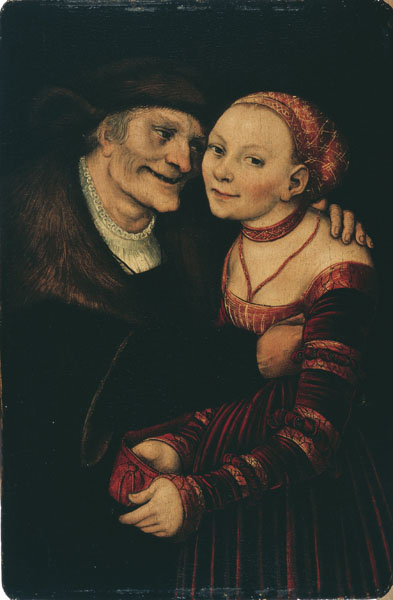
Lucas Cranach the Elder – The Ill-Matched Couple

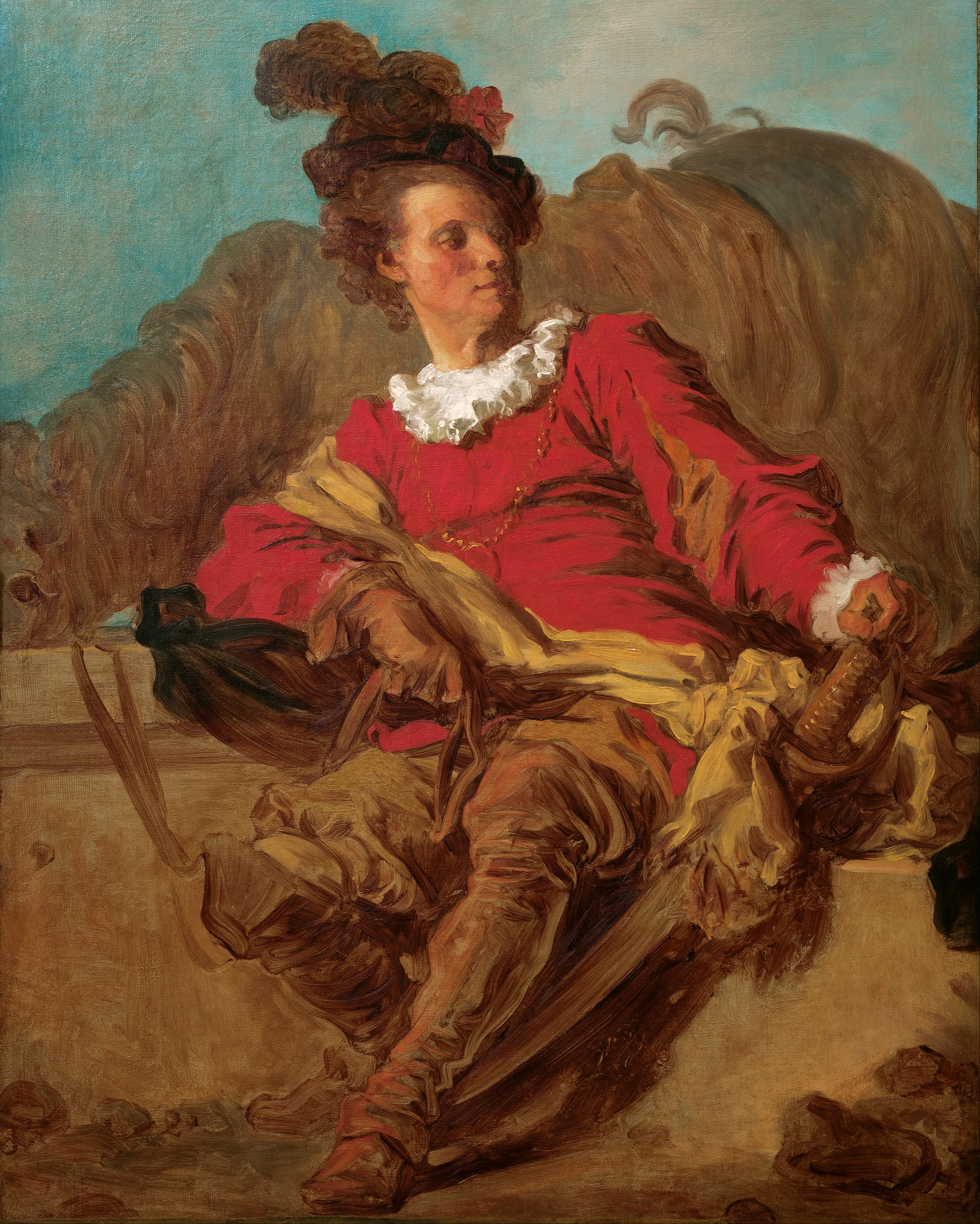
Jean-Honoré Fragonard – Jean-Claude Richard, abbé of Saint-Non

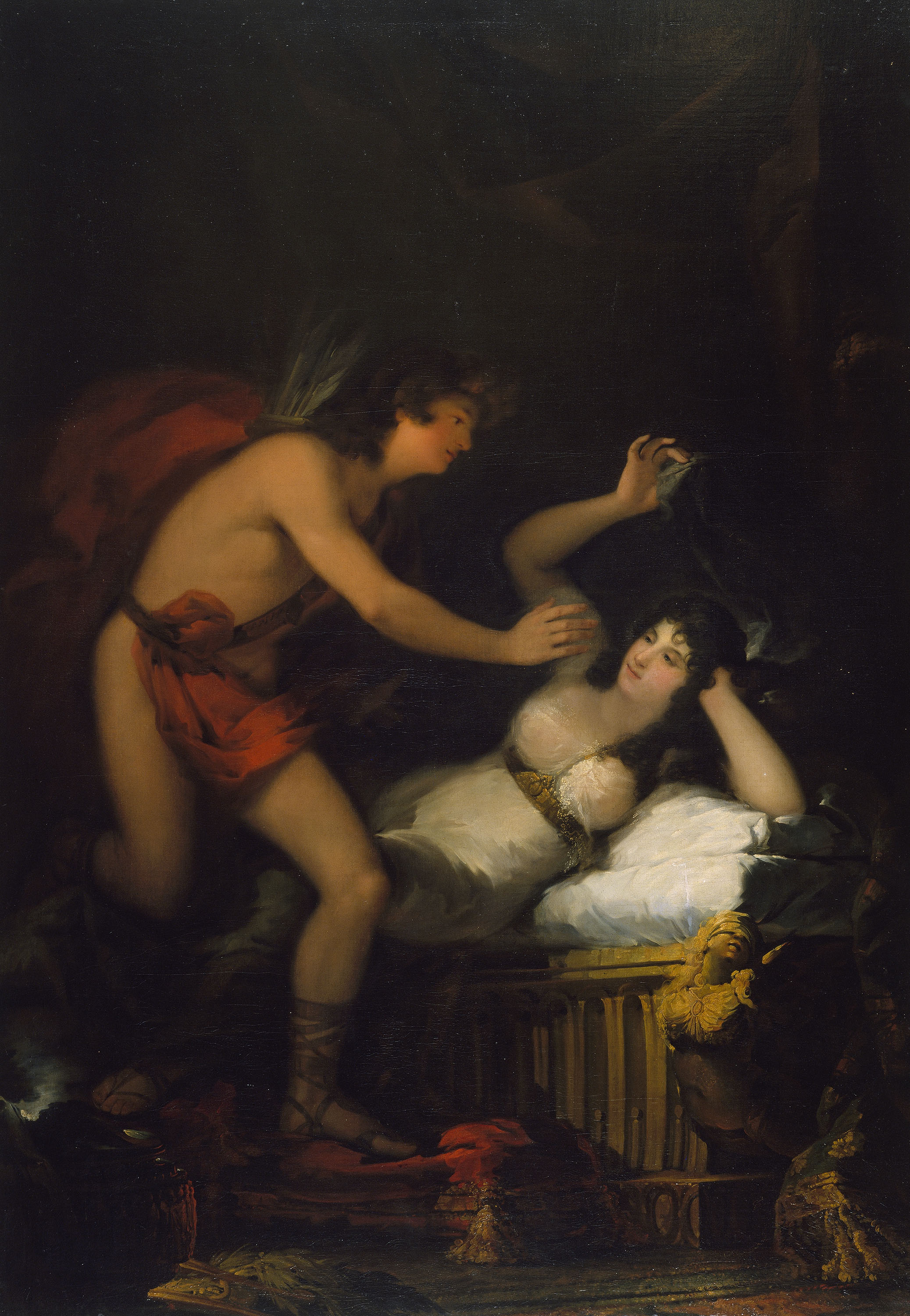
Francisco de Goya – Allegory of Love, Cupid and Psyche

==== Thyssen Bornemisza Collection ====
When the Thyssen-Bornemisza Collection was installed in the Palacio de Villahermosa in Madrid, and the state formalised the purchase in 1993, a number of the works – 72 paintings and 8 sculptures, mainly on religious themes, though also including several landscapes and portraits – were dispatched on permanent loan to Barcelona. In that same year, 1993, the permanent exhibition of these works was officially opened in a wing of Pedralbes Monastery, converted into a museum by Barcelona City Council. In 2004, the Thyssen-Bornemisza Foundation and the Museu Nacional d'Art de Catalunya reached an agreement under which the Thyssen-Bornemisza Collection of Barcelona was to be exhibited permanently at the Museu Nacional, with the dual purpose of complementing the content in the Catalan museum and making the works more widely known and appreciated.

The collection comprises paintings and sculptures spanning European art from the Gothic to the rococo period. There are many Italian works, including, most outstandingly, paintings by Fra Angelico, Pietro da Rimini, Taddeo Gaddi, Francesco del Cossa, Bernardino Butinone, Dosso Dossi, Titian, Ludovico Carracci, Tiepolo and Canaletto, among others. Particularly fine examples from the Flemish school are a painting by Petrus Paulus Rubens and a landscape by Salomon Jacobz van Ruysdael, whilst the Spanish Golden Age is represented by Diego Velázquez's Portrait of Mariana of Austria.

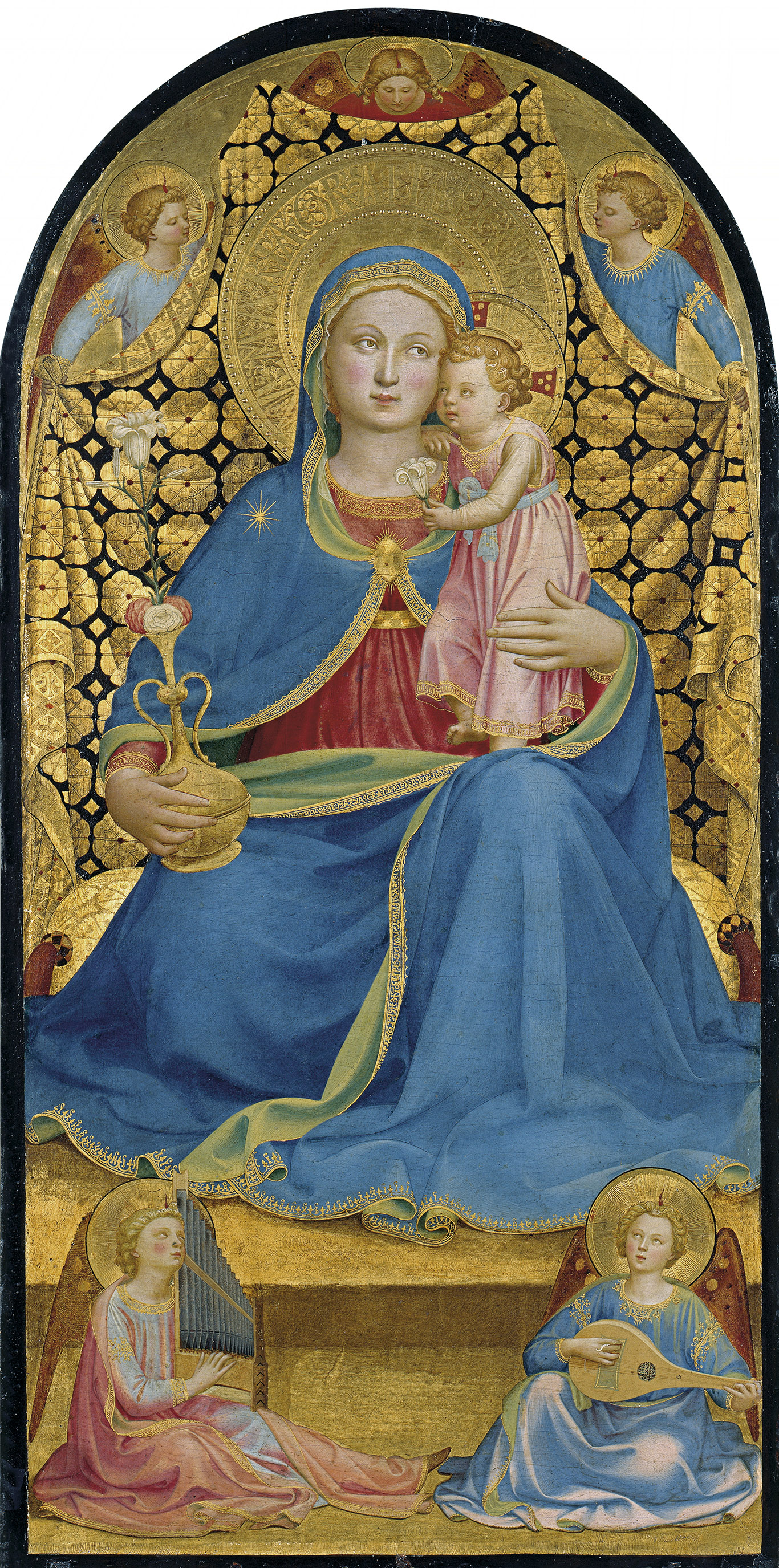
Fra Angelico – Madonna of Humility

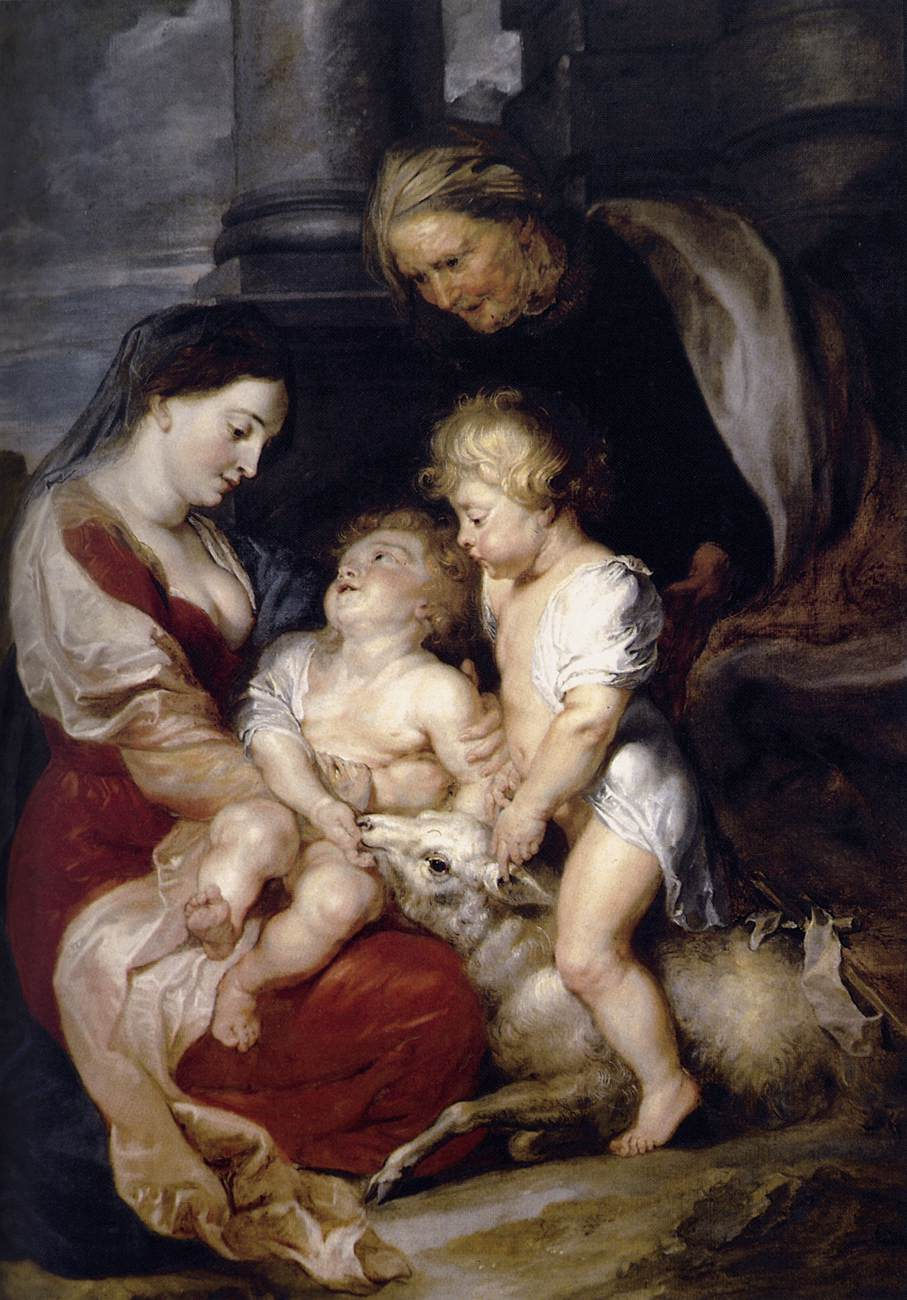
Peter Paul Rubens – The Virgin and Child with Saint Elizabeth and Saint John the Baptist

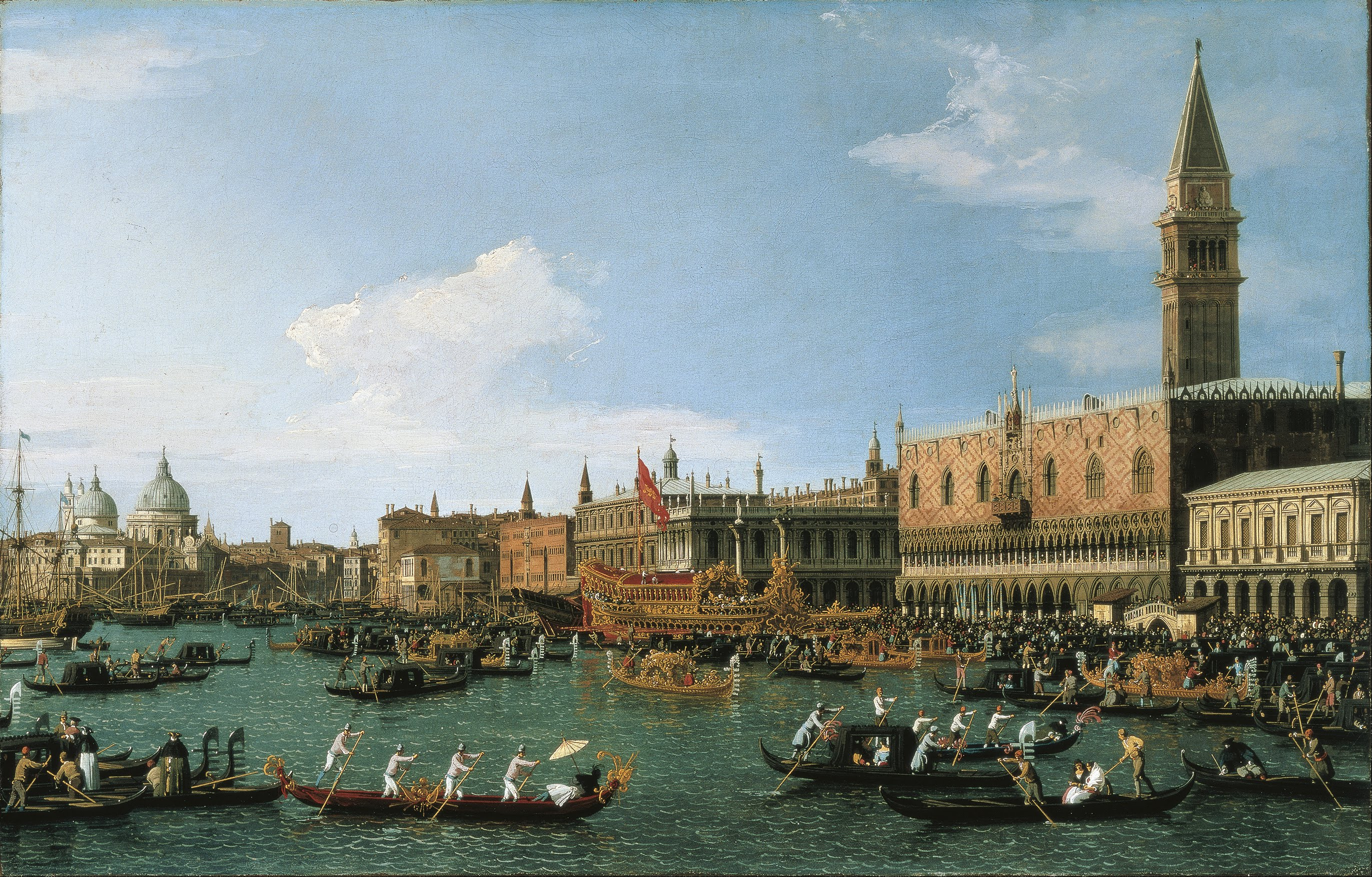
Canaletto – Return of 'Il Bucintoro' on Ascension Day

=== Modern Art Collection ===
The Museu Nacional d'Art de Catalunya modern art collection owes its origins to the 1888 Universal Exhibition, when Barcelona City Council installed what was then a modest collection of contemporary (for the time) modern art in the Palau de Belles Arts. This original core of the collection was considerably expanded by acquisitions made by the Council at art exhibitions. As it stands at present, the modern art collection contains a selection of the finest Catalan art from the early 19th century until the 1940s.

The first part of this itinerary is devoted to the neoclassical, Romantic and realist movements. Among the most outstanding Catalan neoclassical artists represented here are the painter Josep Bernat Flaugier and the sculptor Damià Campeny. In terms of Romanticism, particular mention should be made of Nazarene painters such as Claudi Lorenzale, who focussed on the portrait most notably, and Lluís Rigalt, a precursor of the Catalan landscape tradition, which was continued (now entering the Realist period) by Ramon Martí Alsina, who introduced Courbet's ideas in Catalonia, and Joaquim Vayreda, founder of the Olot School, among others. Special mention should also be made of Marià Fortuny, Catalonia's finest 19th-century painter. Fortuny's genre painting won him international acclaim, although towards the end of his short life he became interested in pictorial innovation, as can be seen in his last works. Also represented here are several painters who worked in the style of anecdotal realism, including Romà Ribera and Francesc Masriera, and the Luminists of the Sitges School, disciples of Fortuny. Turning now to sculpture, the Vallmitjana brothers are the most outstanding exponents of the realist tradition. Finally, the section devoted to the 19th century also includes examples from early photographic art, featuring works by A. A. Disdéri, Jean Laurent, Le Jeune and Charles Clifford, among others, featuring images of different places from all over Spanish territory.

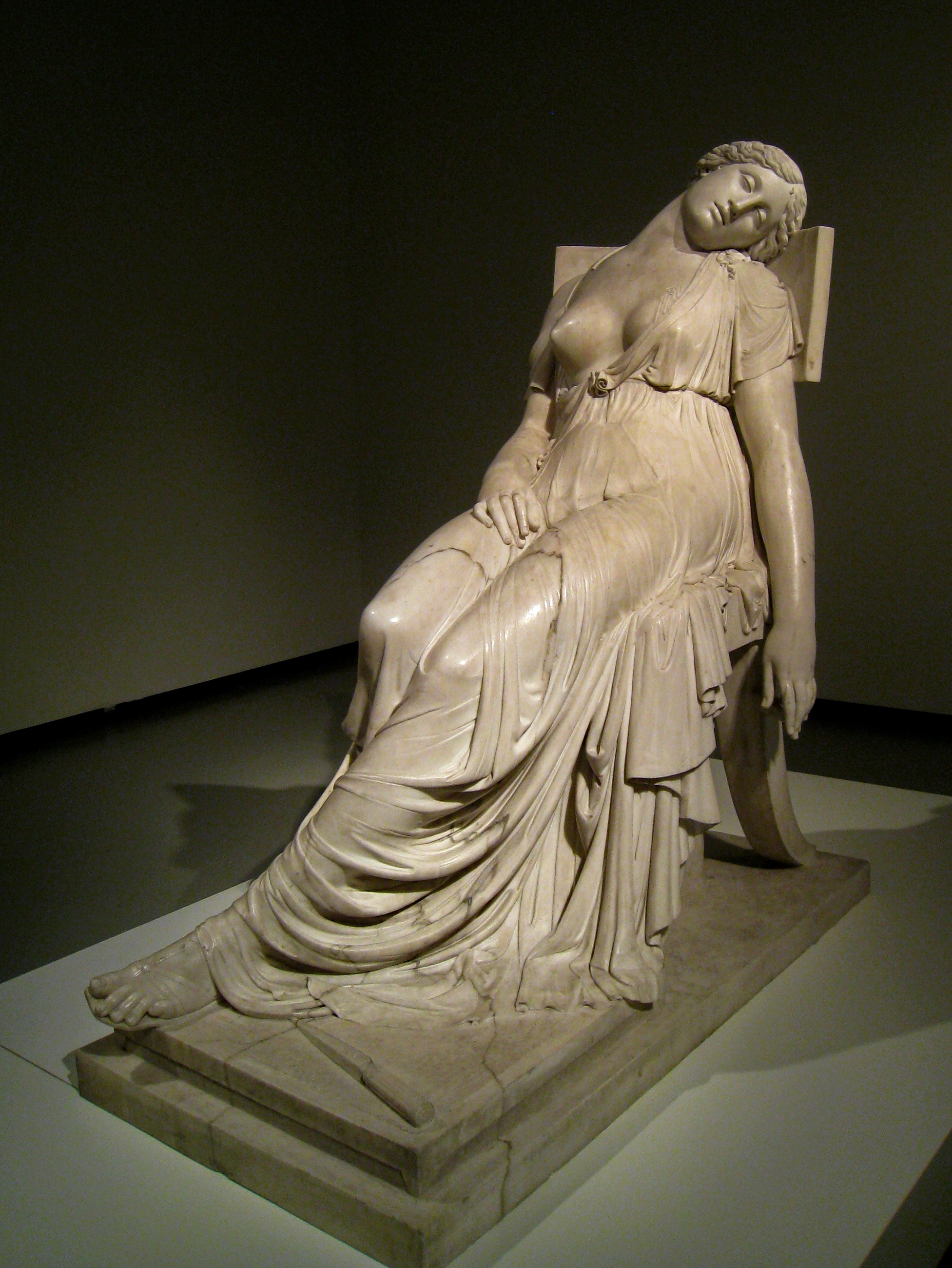
Damià Campeny – Lucrècia morta

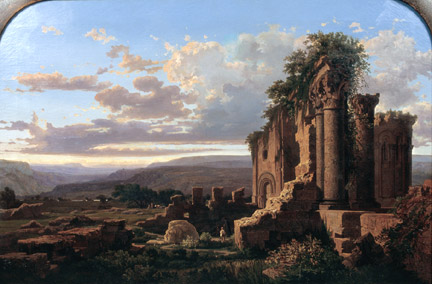
Lluís Rigalt – Ruins

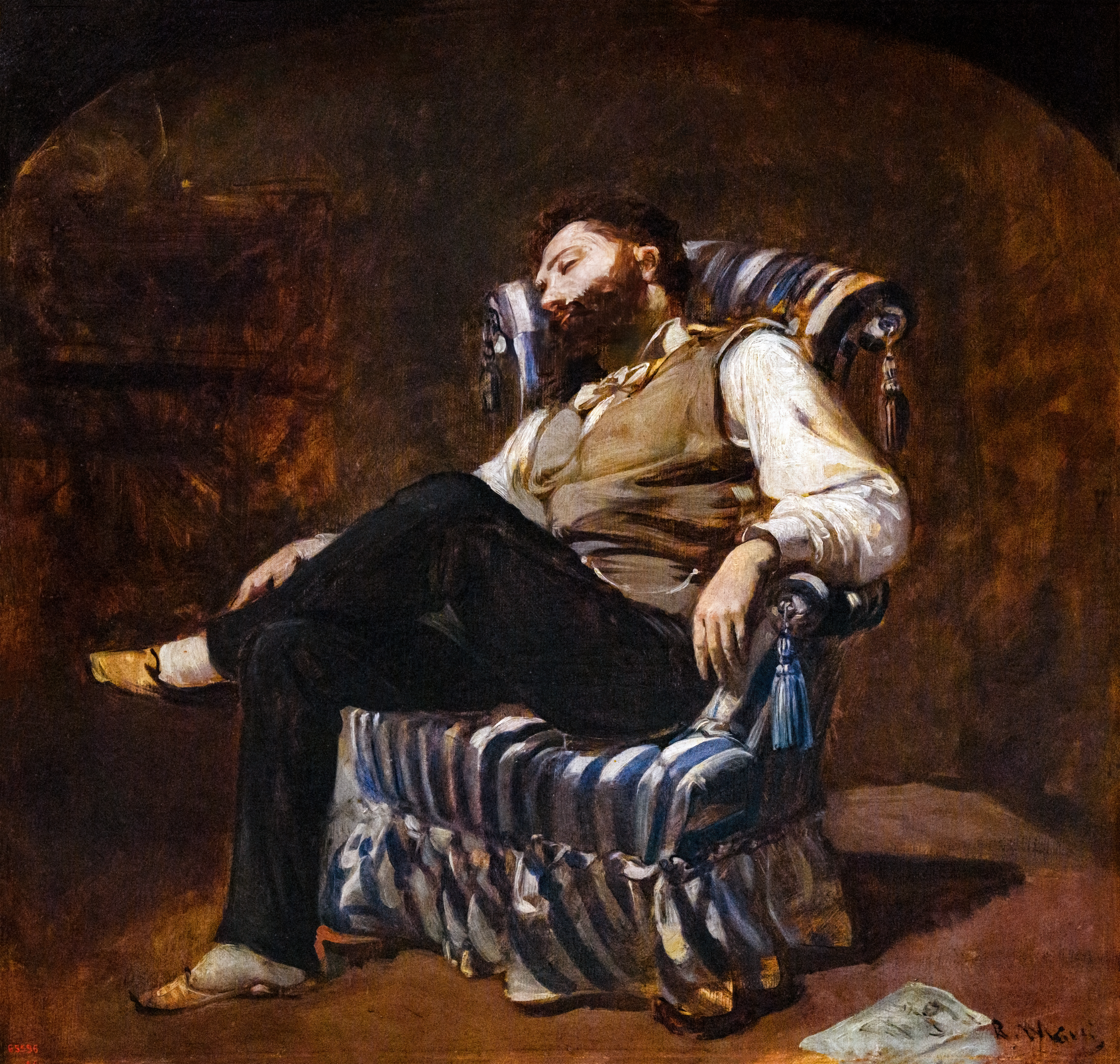
Ramon Martí i Alsina – The Siesta

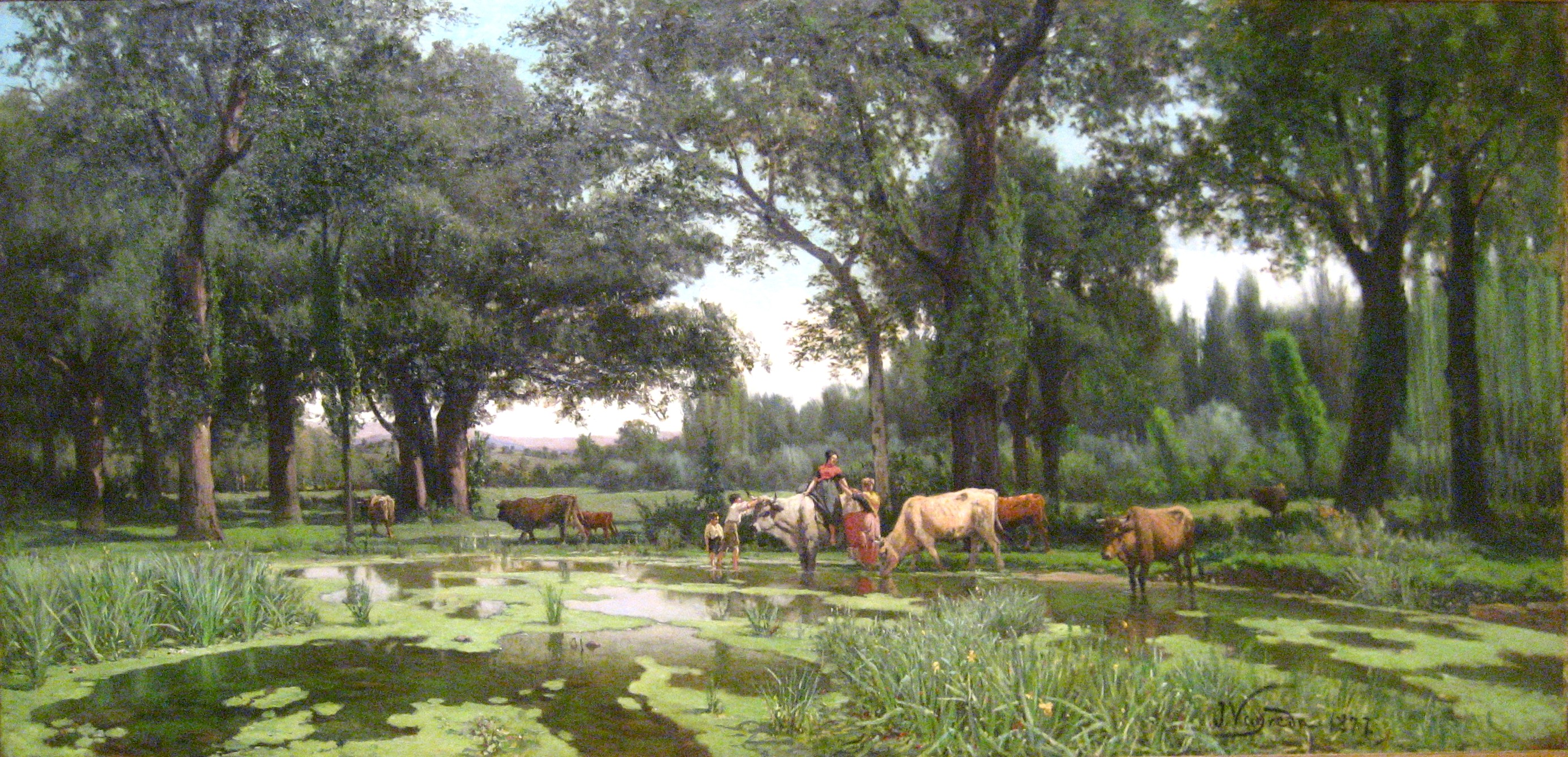
Joaquim Vayreda – Summer Bloom

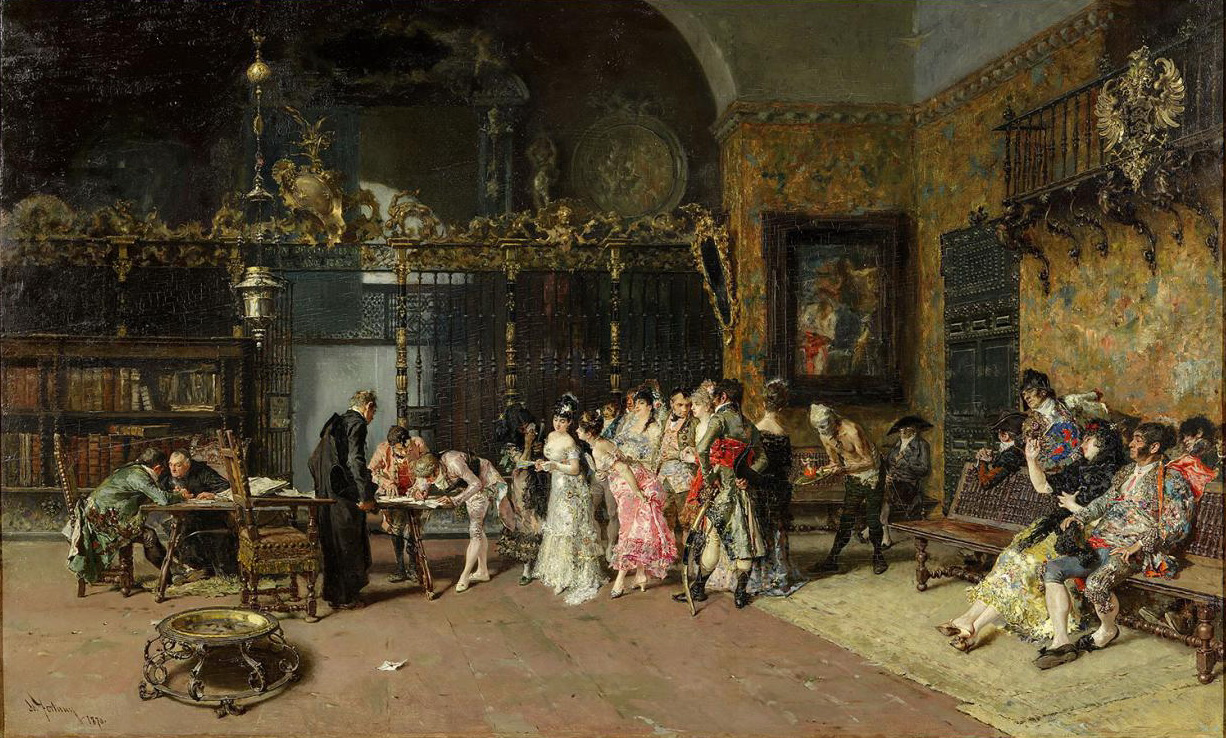
Marià Fortuny – The Spanish Wedding

Modernisme is a movement of enormous artistic and cultural importance in Catalonia, is one of the central themes in the Museu Nacional modern art collection. In painting, the works most clearly identified with this movement, infused with a spirit of renewal, are those by Ramon Casas and Santiago Rusiñol, whose Parisian paintings embrace certain elements from French Impressionism. Another important trend is Symbolism, represented here by the paintings of Alexandre de Riquer and Joan Brull, and also seen in certain photographs by the pictorialist Pere Casas Abarca. The second generation of Modernista artists are present in depth and number, too, with works by the likes of Isidre Nonell, Marià Pidelaserra, Ricard Canals, Hermen Anglada–Camarasa, Nicolau Raurich and Joaquim Mir, among others. It was these and other artists who helped to elevate Catalan painting to reach one of its most brilliant periods around the turn of the 20th century. The collection also includes works by Spanish painters, such as Julio Romero de Torres, Joaquim Sorolla, Ignacio Zuloaga, Darío de Regoyos and José Gutiérrez Solana, the photographer Ortiz-Echagüe and the French artists Boudin, Sisley and Rodin. Particularly interesting in the section devoted to Modernista sculpture are the works of Miquel Blay and Josep Llimona, who were clearly influenced by Rodin. The collection of Modernista decorative arts includes some exceptional examples of interior decorative art by Josep Puig i Cadafalch, Gaspar Homar and Antoni Gaudí from, respectively, the Amatller, Lleó Morera and Batlló houses in Barcelona's Passeig de Gràcia; objets d'art in various specialities, such as ironwork, ceramics, glasswork and jewellery; not forgetting several items of furniture by Joan Busquets and the architect Josep Maria Jujol.

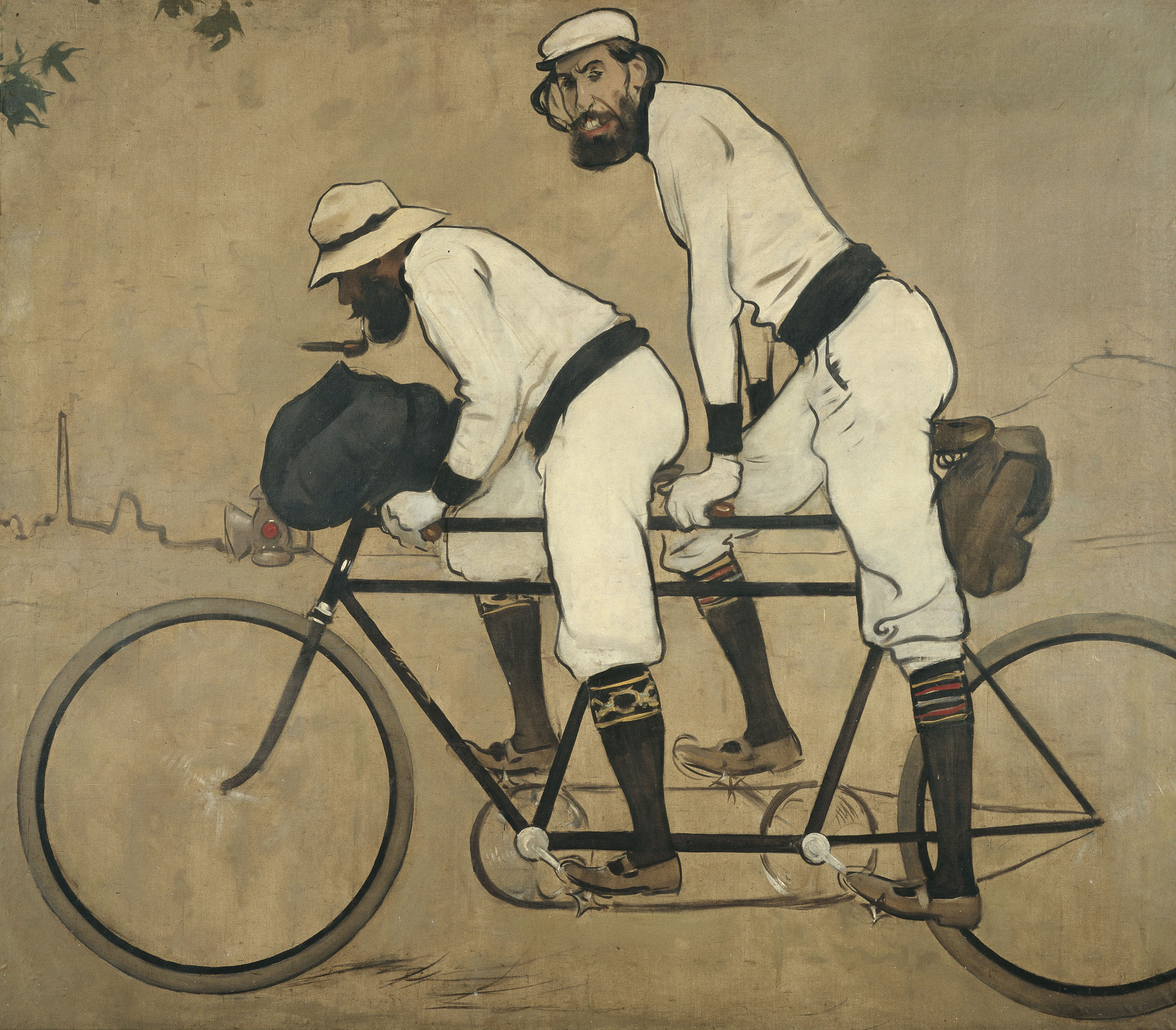
Ramon Casas – Ramon Casas and Pere Romeu on a Tandem

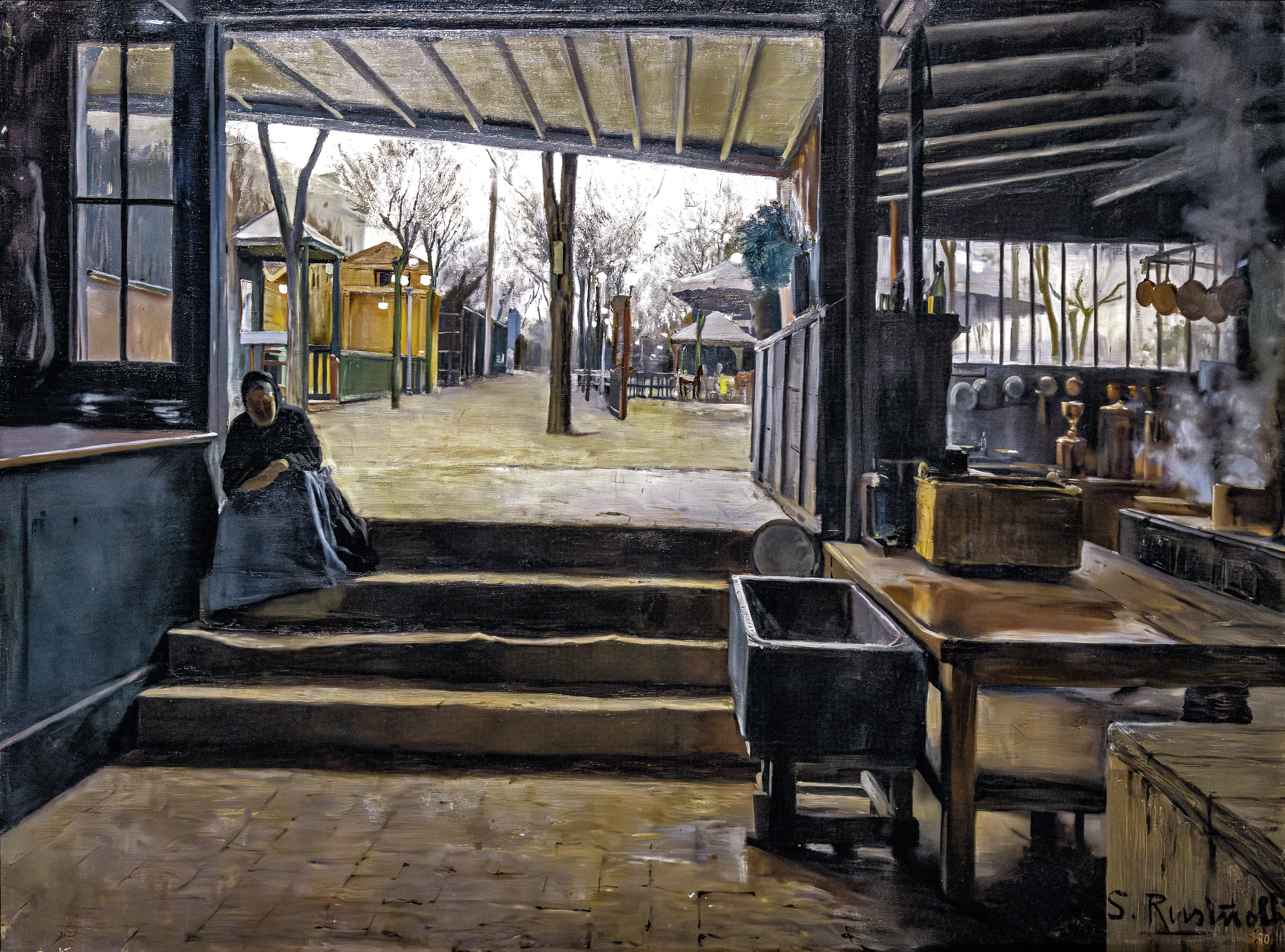
Santiago Rusiñol – Laboratory of La Galette

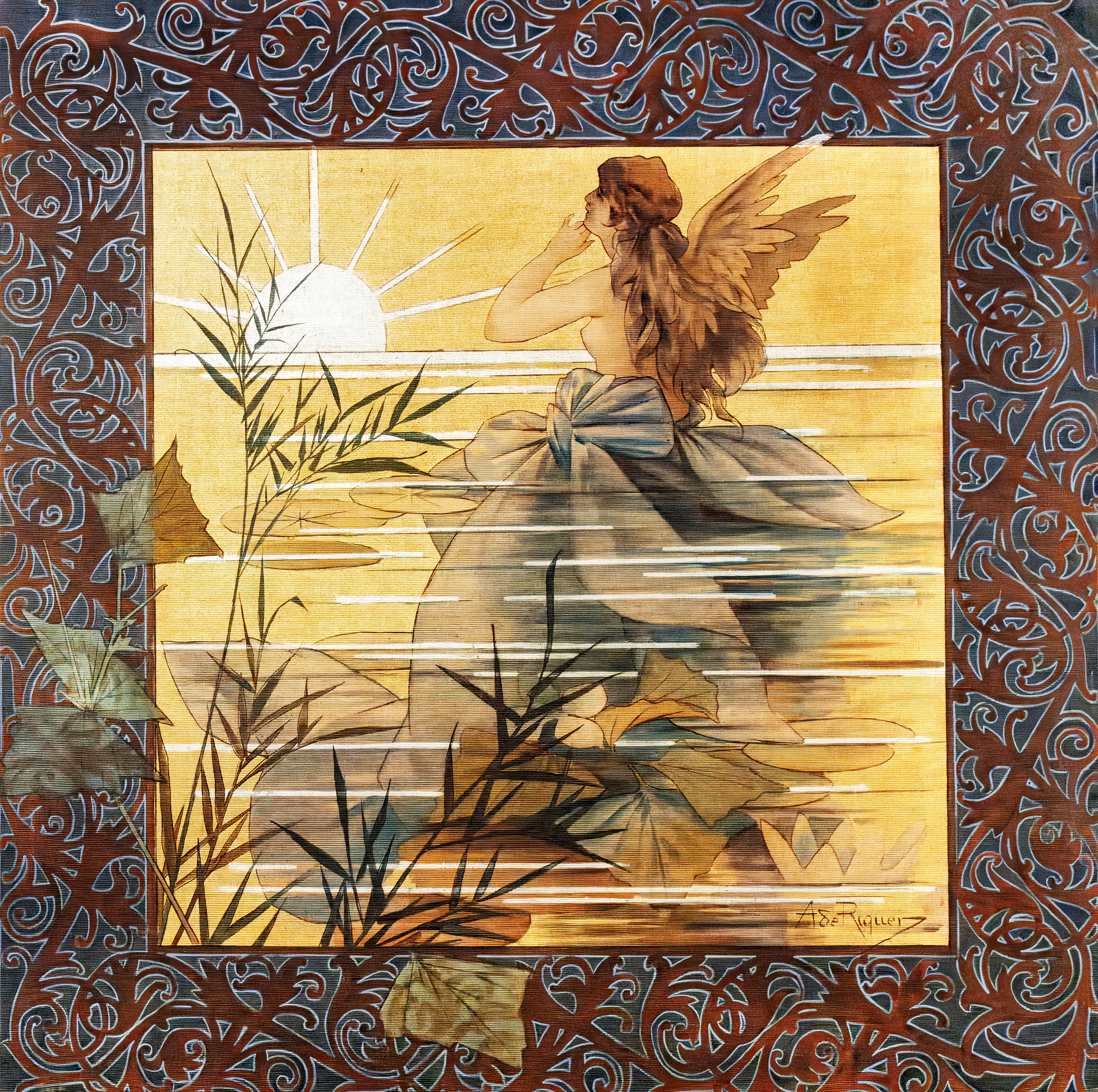
Alexandre de Riquer – Composition with winged nymph at sunrise

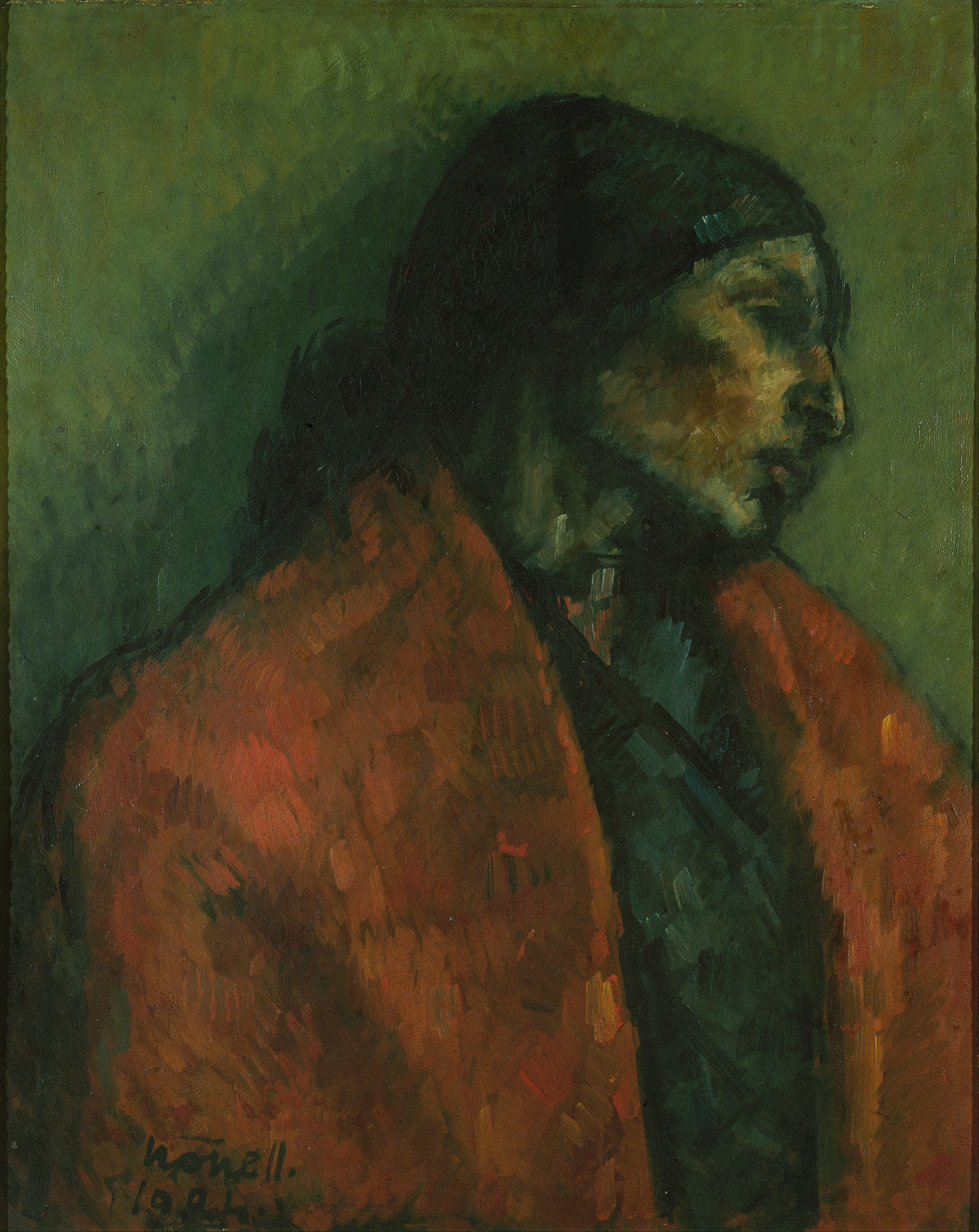
Isidre Nonell – La Paloma

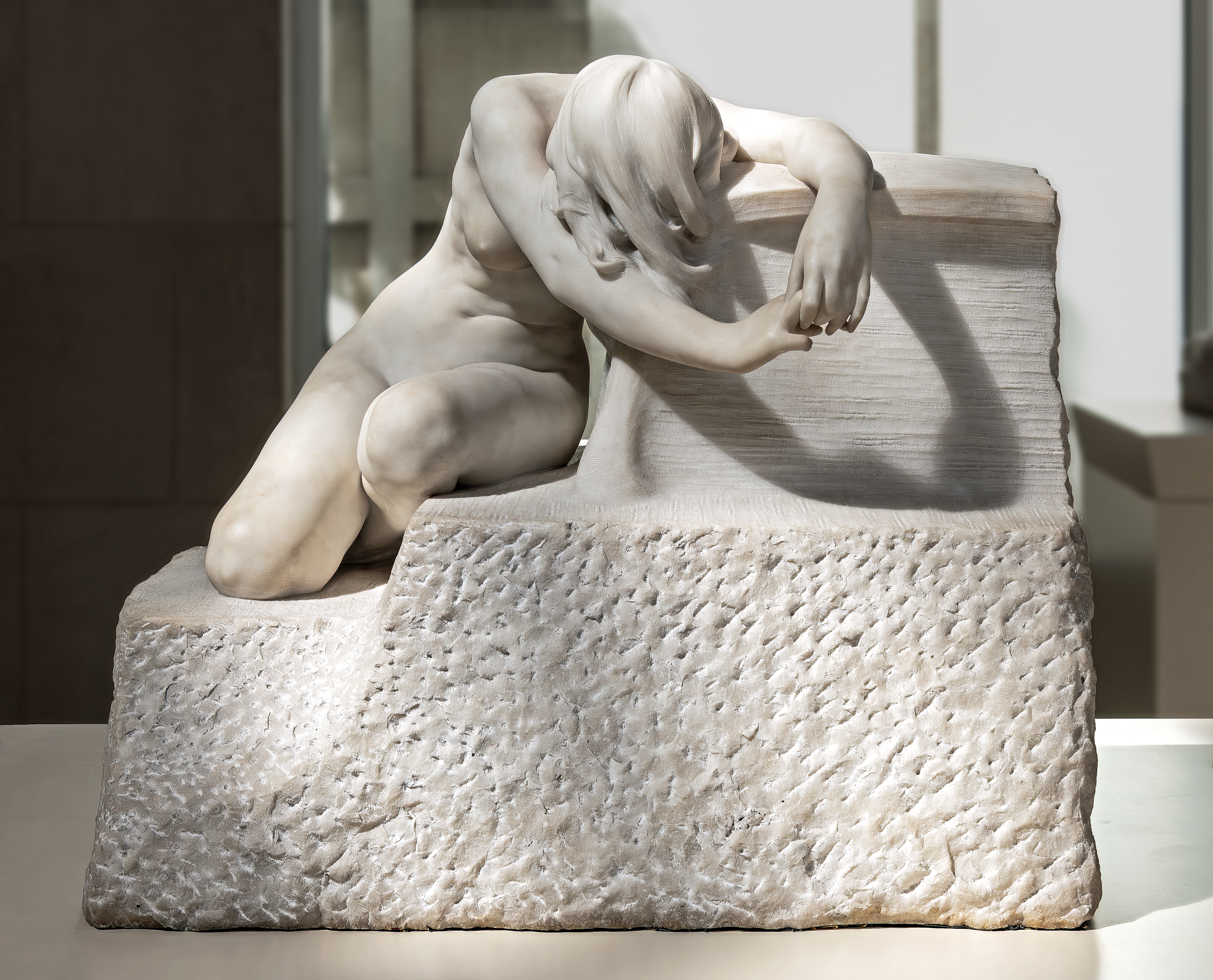
Josep Llimona – Desolation

The second movement richly represented in the Museu Nacional modern art collection is Noucentisme, which embodies the quest for the essential spirit of the Mediterranean. The movement is represented by the classical compositions of Joaquín Torres García and Joaquim Sunyer, vaguely influenced by Cézanne, and the sculptural nudes of Josep Clarà and Enric Casanovas. Completing this review of Noucentisme are the sculptures by Manolo Hugué and the paintings by Xavier Nogués, notably popular in tone. In around 1920, a new generation of artists emerged, one faced by the dilemma of either continuing in the figurative tradition or making the leap to the avant-garde. Some of these, such as the painters Josep de Togores and Francesc Domingo, produced work with a style of its own within the context of international realism, a movement that gained many followers between the wars. Others, such as Torres-García himself, Rafael Barradas and Salvador Dalí, found in the Galeries Dalmau the ideal gallery at which to show their more innovative works.

The historic avant-garde is very well represented, particularly in terms of sculpture, with works including impressive sculptures by Pablo Gargallo, Julio González and Leandre Cristòfol, whilst in painting the most exceptional figure is Pablo Picasso, represented in the Museu Nacional d'Art de Catalunya collection since 2007.

Turning now to the field of photography, we should mention such avant-garde artists as Josep Masana, Josep Batlles, Pere Català Pic and Emili Godes, as well as Agustí Centelles for his important graphic work documenting the Spanish Civil War. Finally, the new avant-garde that emerged during the post-war years is represented by Otho Lloyd and Joaquim Gomis, whose pioneering work found its continuation in the Neorealists Francesc Català-Roca, Joan Colom, Oriol Maspons and Xavier Miserachs, among others.

==== The Carmen Thyssen Bornemisza Collection ====
In late 2004, to mark the opening of the Museu Nacional d'Art de Catalunya, the museum received a score of Catalan art works from the Thyssen-Bornemisza Collection. In view of the wealth and heterogeneity of this collection, the works loaned to the Museu Nacional focus more on diversity than on unity of discourse, with the object of giving an idea, if overly concise, of the plurality of this collection.

The chronological period covered by this section spans from the mid-19th to the mid-20th century, one of the most brilliant moments in the history of Catalan art. Notable amongst the 19th-century pieces is Marià Fortuny's Bullfight, Wounded Picador, painted in 1867. As regards the Modernista movement, several of the most important artists from this period are represented, featuring Open-Air Interior (1892) and Ramon Casas and Pere Romeu on a Tandem (1897), both by Ramon Casas; Le Paon Blanc by Hermen Anglada-Camarasa; and The Cathedral of the Poor (in which the Church of the Sagrada Familia, under construction, is seen in the background) and The Abyss. Majorca (1901–1904) by Joaquim Mir. Equally noteworthy is the presence of Noucentisme, a movement deeply rooted in Catalonia, with paintings by Joaquim Torres-García and Joaquim Sunyer, as well as works by younger artists who continued the Noucentista spirit. Finally, this journey through the history of Catalan modern art leads to the acclaimed Antoni Tàpies.

==== Cabinet of Drawings and Prints ====
The collections assembled from the museum's historic holdings to form the Museu Nacional d'Art de Catalunya Cabinet of Drawings and Prints comprise some 50,000 drawings, 70,000 engravings and more than 1,000 posters. The founds combine to offer a rich and wide-ranging journey through the most important movements in the history of Catalan art, particularly since the late 18th century, thanks largely to the establishment in Barcelona in 1775 of the Free School of Design and the Fine Arts. Popularly known as La Llotja, this school quickly became a reference point in the consolidation of the academic style in Catalonia. Representing the period from Neoclassicism to Realism, the Museu Nacional collections of works on paper feature a considerable number of pieces by artists linked to the school in the 19th century, including Josep Bernat Flaugier, Vicent Rodés, Claudi Lorenzale and Ramon Martí Alsina, as well as others by members of certain families, such as the Planella and the Rigalt lineages, who produced various generations of artists. From the preceding periods, we should highlight in particular the contribution made by the most outstanding Catalan baroque painter, Antoni Viladomat, who is represented by many works in the Cabinet of Drawings and Prints. As recently as 2003, moreover, the collection was enhanced by the acquisition of a group of Catalan baroque altar works from César Martinell's unique collection, which provide an interesting view of Catalan altarpiece art in the 17th and 18th centuries.

However, there can be no doubt that one of the true highlights of these collections is the important body of works by Marià Fortuny, which include more than 1,500 drawings and 50 engravings, making the Cabinet of Drawings and Prints an essential reference for reconstructing the creative trajectory of this great 19th-century artist. From the same period, moreover, are more than 30 drawings by the history painter Eduardo Rosales, acquired in 1912, and linked to two of his finest and most characteristic historic compositions: The Testament of Queen Isabella the Catholic and the Death of Lucrecia.

The Modernista and noucentista movements are also widely represented in the Cabinet holdings. The collections include over 600 Modernista posters by renowned Catalan and international artists. Among the most notable are those by the Catalan artist Ramon Casas. Of particular note is the series of charcoal sketches, a portrait gallery of leading Catalan personalities of the era, which Casas himself donated to the museum in 1909. Turning to the Noucentista movement, particular attention should be paid to Isidre Nonell, who is represented in the Cabinet by around 150 pieces.

The museum also holds a collection of over 500 period posters, largely acquired from Lluís Plandiura in 1903. Including works by both Catalan and international artists, the collection serves as an important resource for the history of poster art in Catalonia.

Finally, though the collection is rather uneven here, mention should be made of the printed works from the avant-garde movement. The sculptor Juli González is one of the avant-garde artists most amply represented in the Cabinet, thanks to the donation of more than 150 drawings made by his daughter in 1972. On the other hand, the presence of certain great contemporary creative artists such as Dalí and Miró, to mention but two, is little more than anecdotal.

Two acquisitions made by the old Museums Board were fundamental to forming the collections contained in the Cabinet of Drawings and Prints. The first was the collection of literary and art critic Raimon Casellas, in 1911; the second, that of Modernista artist Alexandre de Riquer, ten years later.

==== Numismatic Cabinet of Catalonia ====
The collections of the Numismatic Cabinet of Catalonia, established in 1932, now comprises more than 134,000 pieces. This rich holding is the result of a long process of acquisition by purchase, donation, legacy or deposit, which began in the first half of the 19th century and continues even today.

The coin collection comprises nearly 100,000 pieces, including examples from the main series minted from the 6th century BC to the present. The most important and interesting amongst these are, without doubt, the coins produced in Catalonia, which include many extremely rare and unique pieces. The visit to the Numismatic Cabinet begins with the series of ancient coinage, outstanding among which are those minted on the Iberian Peninsula. These include such important pieces as the coins from the Greek colonies of Emporion and Rhode and the treasure of 897 silver pieces found at the neapolis of Emporion. Dating back to the transition period between the ancient and medieval worlds is the collection of Visigoth coins, including some minted at workshops in Catalan territory, such as Barcino, Tarraco or Gerunda. Practically all the western European kingdoms are represented in the medieval Christian series, although the collections of coins from Catalonia and Aragon are the most notable. They include examples that illustrate, step by step, the historic and economic evolution of these lands. For example, the economic growth that Catalonia enjoyed in the 13th century is reflected in the minting in Barcelona for the first time of silver Peter II Croats. Finally, among the coins minted in the modern and contemporary periods, we should mention particularly those produced in Catalonia during three important historic periods: the Reapers War, the War of the Spanish Succession and the French occupation.

The medals collection is formed by more than 9,000 pieces, which range from the earliest, struck in Italy in the second half of the 15th century, to the present. The greater part of this collection is made up of works produced in Spain, mostly by well-known artists and engravers, who created medals of the highest quality. For example, the Museu Nacional medals collection features works by such outstanding 18th-century master engravers as Tomás Francisco Prieto and Jerónimo Antonio Gil. During the late 19th century, moreover, particularly after the 1888 Barcelona Exhibition, many Modernista sculptors turned to the art of medal-making, and the examples in the Cabinet fully reflect what was a splendid creative period for the genre, particularly in Catalonia. The leading artist in the field was, without doubt, Eusebi Arnau, but such sculptors as Parera, Blay, Llimona and Gargallo also created medals of the highest quality.

The central core of the MNC paper money collection, which embraces a wide range of documents of different types, is formed by its 4,100 examples of banknotes. These include the Spanish series containing all the banknotes issued by the Bank of Spain from 1874 to the present, as well as the series of paper money printed by the Catalan Government and local authorities in the country during the Spanish Civil War.

The Cabinet also exhibits a range of different pieces of interest due to their direct or indirect connection with numismatics. These include, amongst other things, tools used for minting coin, coin weights, scales, jettons (counters), pellofes and other types of tokens, stamps, medals and various documentary collections.

== The building ==
360° view outside the main entrance to the Palau Nacional

The National Palau of Montjuïc, known as Palau Nacional was constructed between 1926 and 1929, with the goal of being the main building of the 1929 Barcelona International Exposition, holding an Exhibition of Spanish Art named El Arte en España (The Art of Spain). More than 5,000 works came to the Exhibition from across Spain.

The Palau Nacional is a huge building (over 50,000 square metres (540,000 ft^{2})) which embodies the academic classical style that predominated in constructions for all the universal exhibitions of the period. Its façade is crowned by a great dome inspired by St. Peter's Basilica in the Vatican City in Rome, flanked by two smaller domes, while four towers modelled on Santiago de Compostela Cathedral stand at the corners of the so-called Sala Oval, or Oval Hall. This great space (2,300 m2), used as the venue for important civic and cultural events, is encircled by tiered seating, preceded by double columns; it also houses a monumental organ, one of the biggest in Europe, waiting for an important restoration work. Many of the most outstanding painters and sculptors of the day, for the most part followers of the Noucentista aesthetic and cultural movement, were commissioned to decorate the interior of the Palau. Entrance from the front is by a huge staircase leading up from Avinguda de la Reina Maria Cristina, flanked halfway by magnificent monumental illuminated fountains designed by Carles Buïgas.

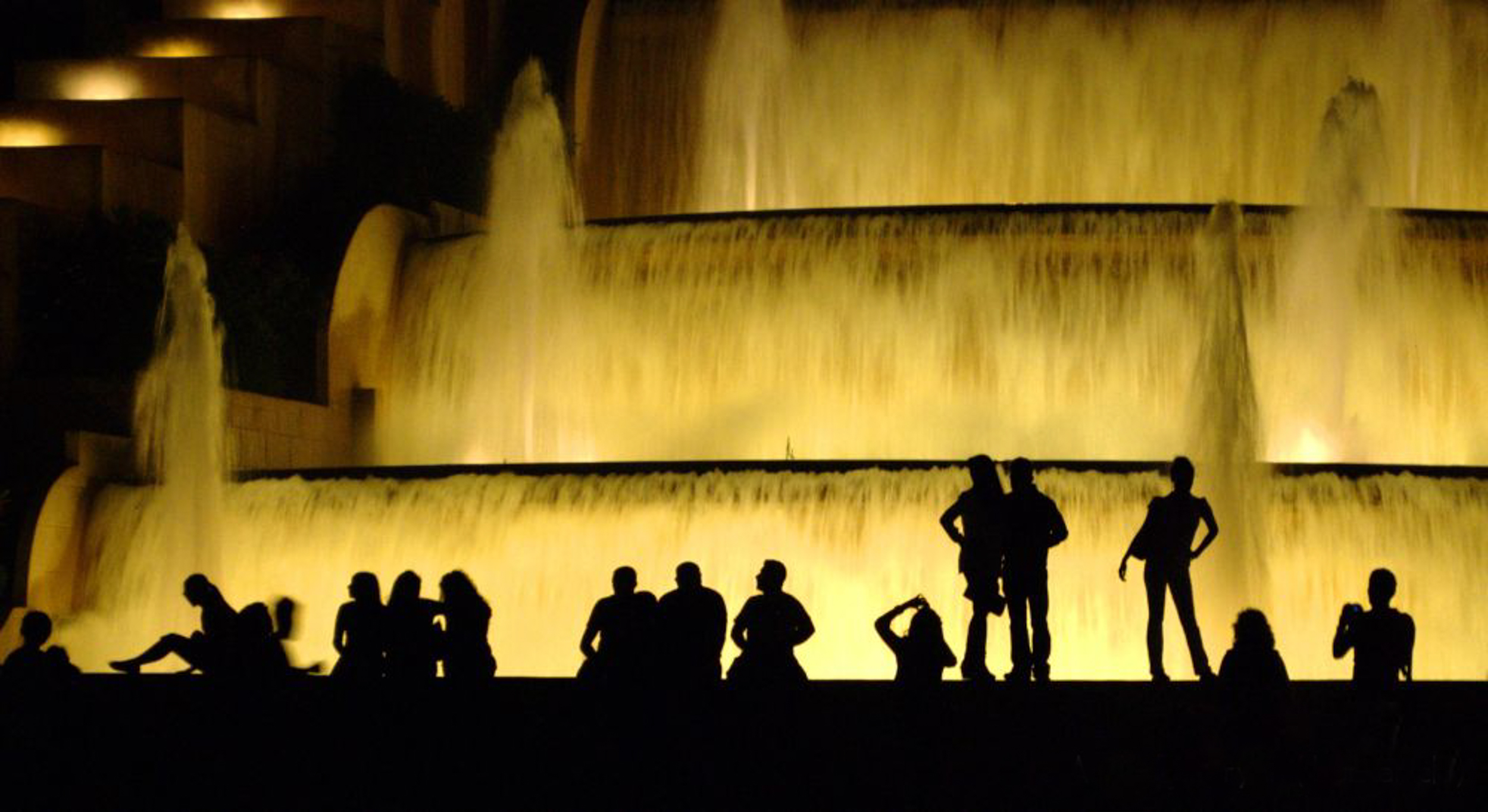
Fountains in front of MNAC

The first projects to develop the slopes of Montjuïc, turning the mountain into the city's green lung and a leisure activity centre for the people of Barcelona, date back to the early 20th century. However, these ideas were given decisive momentum when Montjuïc was chosen as the site for the great International Exhibition organised by the city in 1929. The renowned Modernisme architect Josep Puig i Cadafalch was commissioned to direct the urban development and architectural aspects of this project, and Juan Claude Nicolas Forestier and Nicolau Maria Rubió i Tudurí landscaped the gardens. Under these plans, the Palau Nacional was to be the central palace for the exhibition. In 1923, the dictator Primo de Rivera seized power, with the result that Puig i Cadafalch was removed from the project. A competition to design and build the Palau Nacional was then won by the architects Eugenio P. Cendoya, Enric Catà and Pere Domènech i Roura. The palace was to provide the central venue for a great exhibition entitled Art in Spain and featuring original works and reproductions representing the history of Spanish art, complemented by two extensions: the Poble Espanyol (Spanish Village) architectural site, still open today, and the Palau d'Art Modern (Palace of Modern Art), which was later demolished.

In the area around the Museu Nacional d'Art de Catalunya site, moreover, many of the buildings erected for the 1929 International Exhibition remain, whilst others have also been established. All these different elements form a complex that has become one of the most attractive cultural, commercial and leisure centres in the city. The outstanding buildings dating from the time of the International Exhibition include the pavilions housing the Barcelona Trade Fair (Fira de Barcelona), the Estadi Olímpic Lluís Companys, refurbished for the 1992 Games, the Poble Espanyol and the Teatre Grec, a Greek amphitheatre built in a disused quarry. This gives its name to Barcelona's summer arts festival (GREC).

== Library and archive ==
The library is the most important documentation centre open to the public. Its origins go back to the books referred to by museum technicians in Barcelona when preparing for the 1888 Universal Exhibition. In the early 20th century, the Junta de Museus de Catalunya (Catalan Museums Board) decided that the library should be opened to the public, and decisive impetus was given to this initiative when the Special Committee for the library was set up in 1907. From that year onwards, the library holdings were constantly enriched by legacies and donations from important private libraries.

The Museu Nacional Library collections comprise domestic and foreign books and magazines on different aspects of art: monographic works on art and artists; photography; numismatics; local history; a reserve section containing a collection of manuscripts; incunabula such as the 1493 Nuremberg Chronicle; works published pre 1900; and the books of artists and collector's editions. Sections of particular interest include that devoted to exhibition catalogues, established in 1913 and containing printed matter on shows held at galleries in Barcelona, Catalonia, Spain and even further afield, and 'The Press', established in 1968, which brings together news items published in the daily media and of interest to the artworld.

It is thanks to the Museu Nacional publications policy, that many of these works were acquired – it aims to promote exchanges and so provide the library with copies of works published by museums and art centres all over the world.

The library facilities are designed to provide Museu Nacional d'Art de Catalunya technical staff, researchers, students, art professionals and all individuals interested in the art world with all the information they seek. The reading room provides access to the library catalogue, the Collective Catalogue of Universities (CCUC), several databases (Princeton University, Index of Christian Art; Bibliography of the History of Art; Art Price), and to databases available on CD-ROM and Internet.

Another important element in the Museu Nacional organisational structure is the archive, founded as a department in 1995 to standardise management of the museum's documentary collections. With regard to the origin of these collections, the archive contains both documentation generated by the museum since 1991, when the consortium was set up, and historic documents from institutions that now form part of the Museu Nacional: the Museu d'Art de Catalunya (Art Museum of Catalonia), the Museu d'Art Modern (Museum of Modern Art), the Cabinet of Drawings and Prints, the Numismatic Cabinet of Catalonia, and the Library of Art History.

The archive also conserves invaluable historic documentation in the form of the collections built up by different organising committees for fine art exhibitions (1891–1946). Here, too, are other historic resources related to the world of art and deposited in the museum over the years.

Finally, the archive also contains a section devoted to the image, comprising some 350,000 audiovisual documents, mainly photographs, on different supports and in a variety of formats.

== Network of art museums ==
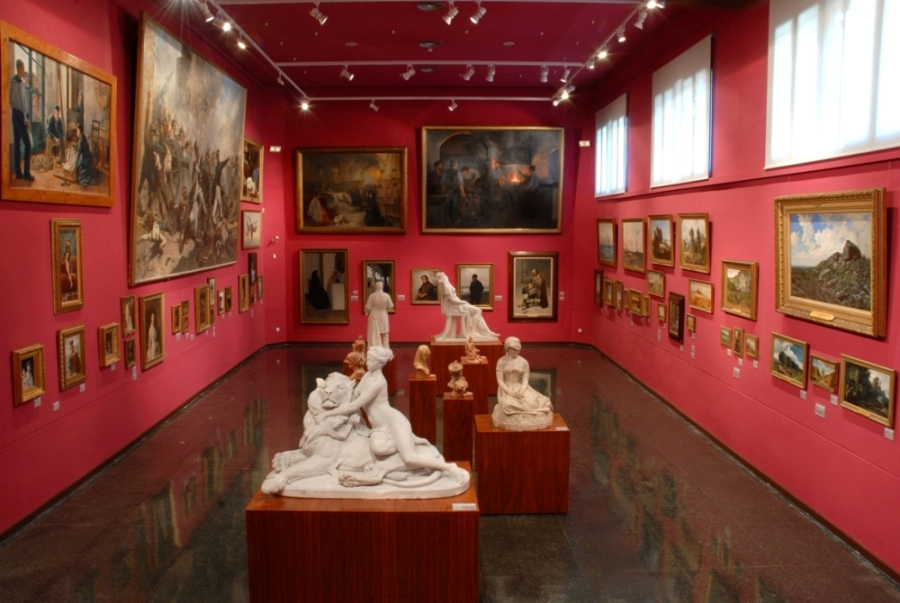
The Victor Balaguer Museum

The Museu Nacional, as a museological institution of reference in the country, promotes a network that joins together the art museums in a common collaboration strategy, for placing value and spreading Catalan artistic heritage. The network of art museums was created with the aim of developing services, projects and activities jointly, so as to achieve a greater social, touristic and scientific projection among all the member museums. The following museums currently form part: Biblioteca-Museu Víctor Balaguer, de Vilanova i la Geltrú; el Museu d'Art de Girona; el Museu Episcopal de Vic; Museu Diocesà i Comarcal de Solsona; el Museu del Cau Ferrat, de Sitges; el Museu de la Garrotxa, d'Olot; el Museu d'Art Jaume Morera, de Lleida; el Museu de Lleida Diocesà i Comarcal; el Museu de l'Empordà, de Figueres; el Museu de Reus; el Museu de Valls; el Museu de Manresa; el Museu d'Art de Sabadell; el Museu Abelló, de Mollet del Vallès; el Museu d'Art Modern de Tarragona; el Museu d'Art de Cerdanyola; la Fundació Apel·les Fenosa, del Vendrell; el Museu d'Art Contemporani de Barcelona; el Museu del Disseny de Barcelona; el Museu Frederic Marès, de Barcelona i la Fundació Palau, de Caldes d'Estrac.

== Educational activities ==
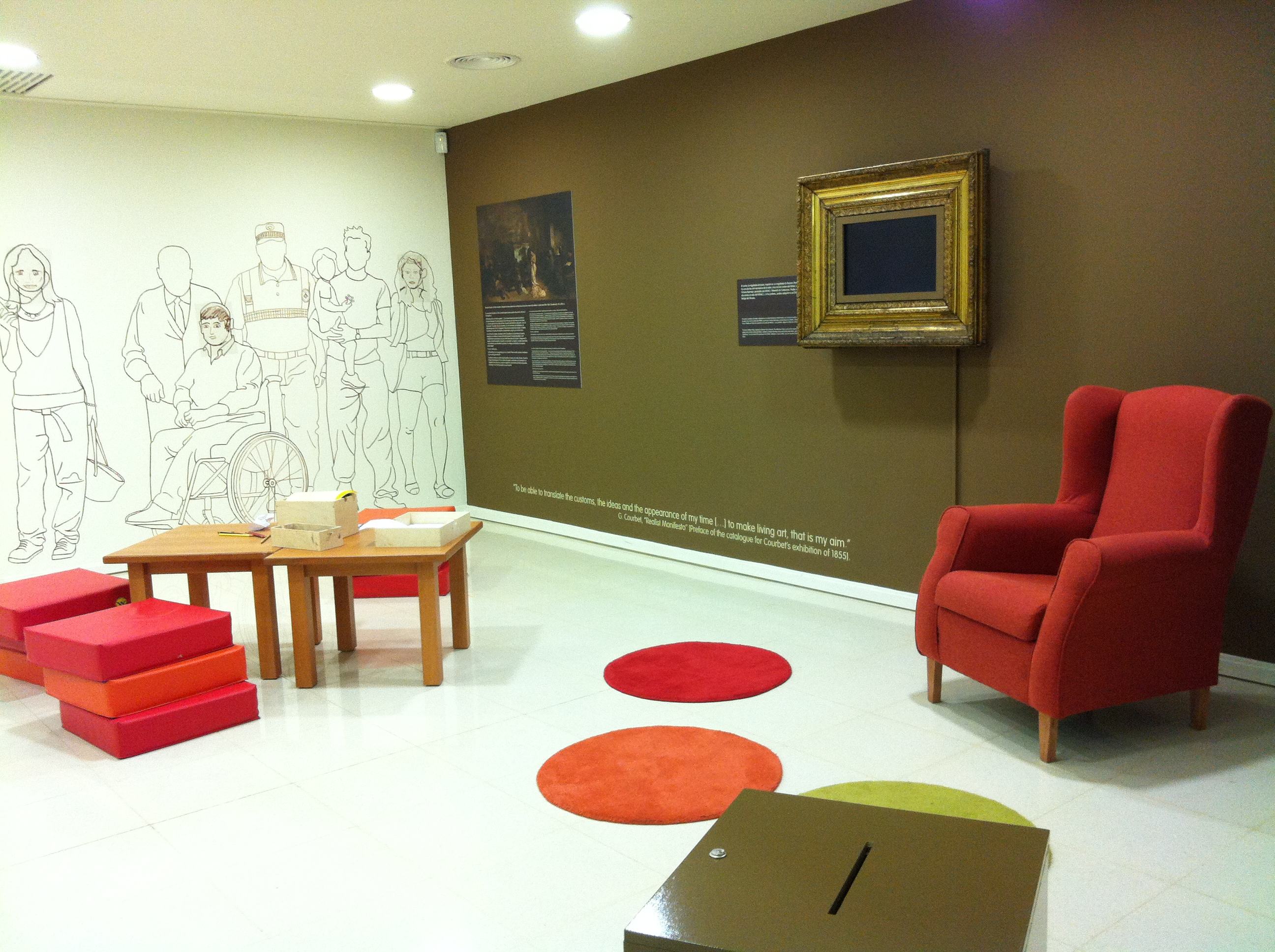
Educational space at the museum

One of the other aspects of the Museu Nacional d'Art de Catalunya is the number of services and training proposals and entertainment for families and schools. The museum has an educational service itself, which offers several resources for learning and services tailored to different audiences. Among others, a program is the museum common space of integration aimed at people at risk of exclusion and use the museum as a key integrator and software Museum hosts, aimed at integrating with other training projects related to art.

Another of the best known proposals is Museum as an integration space (El Museu espai comú d'integració, in Catalan), and also A hand of stories (Una Ma de Contes), a joint initiative between Televisió de Catalunya and Museu Nacional, which explains 20 short stories representing 20 paintings of Museu Nacional permanent collection, with a different look.

There are also activities which are encouraged in the relationship between children and artists active. They participated in activities such contemporary artists as Philip Stanton Gino Rubert or Lluïsa Jover.

== Restoration and Preventive Conservation Centre ==
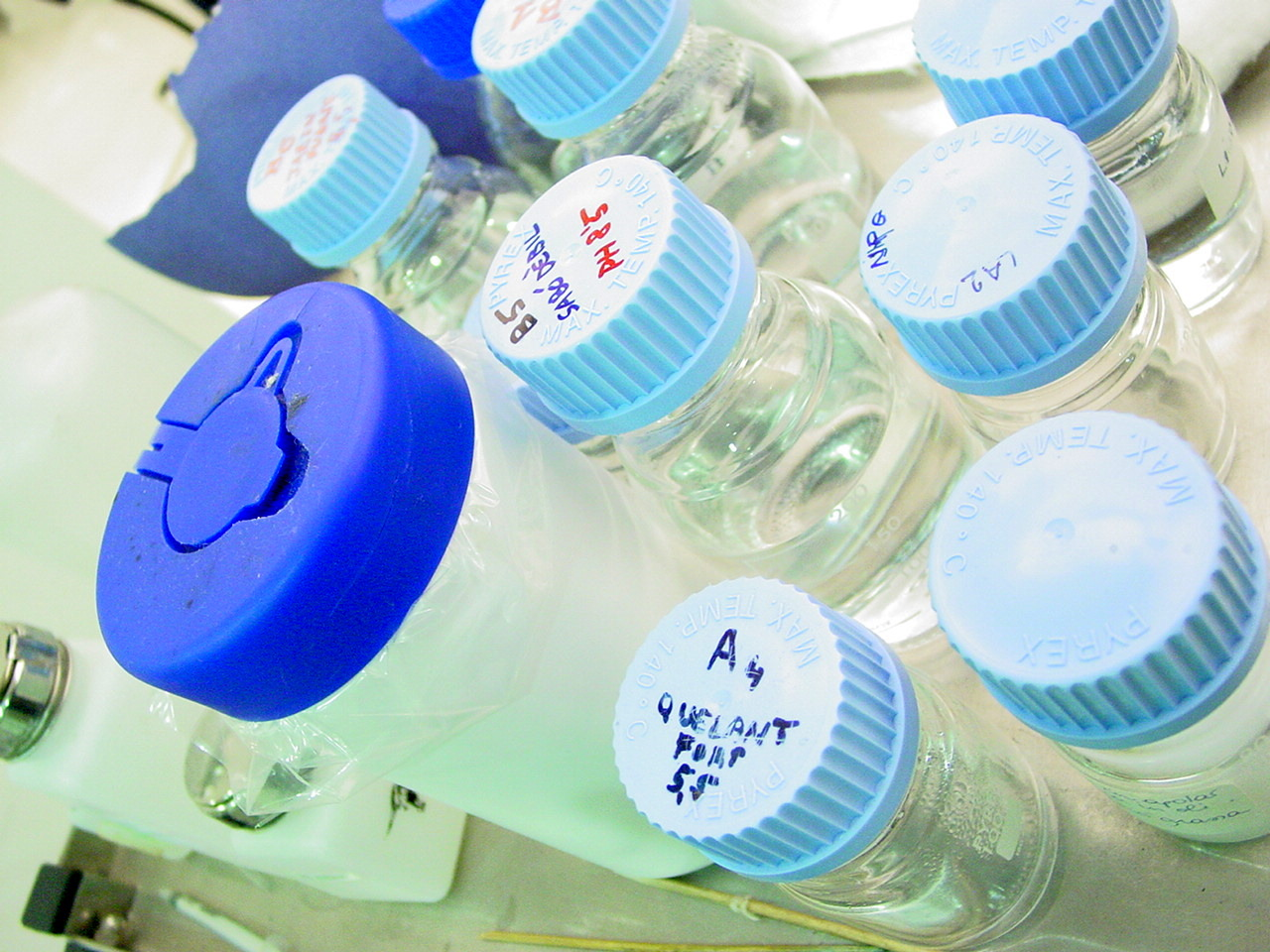
Cleaning tests at the Conservation-Restoration Center of the museum

The aim of the Department of the Restoration and Preventive Conservation is to ensure the conservation of all the works in the Museu Nacional d'Art de Catalunya collections. The department helps to guarantee the physical conservation of all the museum's holdings, including both works on exhibition and in storage, on deposit or on loan, whilst also seeking to delay as far as possible the ageing process that affects the materials that form the artworks. In addition, the Restoration and Preventive Conservation Department also studies the materials and the technical aspects of works with a view to providing scientific and technical assistance for art historians specialising in different periods, promoting dialogue and interdisciplinary studies.

At the centre, professionals from different specialist disciplines study problems affecting the works, or changes they are undergoing, determining the causes of deterioration and doing their utmost to eliminate any risk to the works. In this regard, a key aim is to create a stable environment and to establish the best conditions for exhibiting, storing, handling, packing and transporting works. The centre seeks to minimise deterioration to the collections by ensuring that the most appropriate environmental conditions and exhibition systems are provided, as well as exercising strict control over the movement of objects and the restoration treatments applied to individual works.

Most of the activity at the centre is concerned with prevention, but due importance is also attached to reparative treatment and restoration. Restoration work is aimed at improving the aesthetic reading of pieces on which, very often, restorers from much earlier generations have previously intervened, working according to criteria very different from those applied today. Needless to say, restoration is not carried out in the hope of returning works to their original state; but rather, to take into account the passing of time and any work that has already been carried out on the piece, and which now forms part of the history of restoration in Catalonia in general.

The center exists due to the impulse that Joaquim Folch i Torres gave to the project when he sent Manuel Grau i Mas in Milan with the objective that was formed by the hand of Mauro Pelliccioli, then director of the restoration laboratories in Milan, attached to the Pinacoteca di Brera art gallery. The Milan laboratories had a decisive influence on how restoration work was carried out all over Europe. Work continues today with a view to establishing the Museu Nacional Department of Restoration and Preventive Conservation as a reference and resource, which may operate separately from the museum itself, in terms both of the working methodologies and the rigour and the criteria that the centre applies.

The centre is staffed by scientific personnel devoted to preventive conservation and chemical laboratory work, and by a team of curators and restorers specialising in various disciplines, in accordance with the types of works that form the museum collections: restoration of paint on canvas and transferred painted murals; paint on wooden panels; polychrome wood sculpture; furniture; artwork on paper and photography; and stone, metal and ceramic.

== The Board of Trustees ==
The Board of Trustees governs the museum. As well as representatives from the consortium members, administration, and the management, it is made up of representatives of people who contribute to the achievement of its goals. As of December 2024 the president is Joan Oliveras i Bagués and vice-presidents are Sònia Hernández Almodóvar, Maria Eugènia Gay Rosell, and Jordi Martí Grau.

Members of the board (2024) comprise:

- Ángeles Albert León
- Pere Almeda i Samaranch
- Tatxo Benet Ferran
- Joaquim Borràs Gómez
- Josep Maria Carreté Nadal
- Jordi Carulla i Font
- Laura Cendrós Jorba
- Carles Colomer Casellas
- Elisa Durán Montolio
- María José Gálvez Salvador
- Magda Gassó Hoja
- Cristina Lagé Manich
- Francesc Xavier Marcé Carol
- Rosa Martínez Delgado
- Pau Relat
- Elisenda Rius Bergua
- Elisa Ros Barbosa
- Isaac Sastre de Diego
- Joan Manuel Tresserras Gaju
- Ana Vallès Blasco
- Rafael Villaseca Marco

== Directors ==
List of Museu Nacional d'Art de Catalunya directors since its foundation

- 1934–1939: Joaquim M. Folch i Torres
- 1939–1948: Xavier de Salas
- 1948–1985: Joan Ainaud de Lasarte
- 1985–1985: Lluís Domènech
- 1985–1991: Joan Sureda
- 1991–1994: Xavier Barral
- 1994–2005: Eduard Carbonell
- 2006–2011: Maite Ocaña
- 2012–today: Pepe Serra

== In popular culture ==
- The Museu Nacional d'Art de Catalunya is a featured locale in the 2009 video game Wheelman, published by Midway Games.
- This place was also the 11th pitstop of the four-time Emmy Award winning reality show The Amazing Race 10.

== See also ==
- List of artists from the Museu Nacional collection
- List of museums in Barcelona
- List of museums in Spain
- List of most visited art museums in the world
- List of largest art museums
- List of national galleries
- The Corpus Christi Procession Leaving the Church of Santa Maria del Mar by Ramon Casas
- Saint Agnes by Massimo Stanzione
- Pendant with Saint George
