= Gonzalo Pérez =

Valencian painter

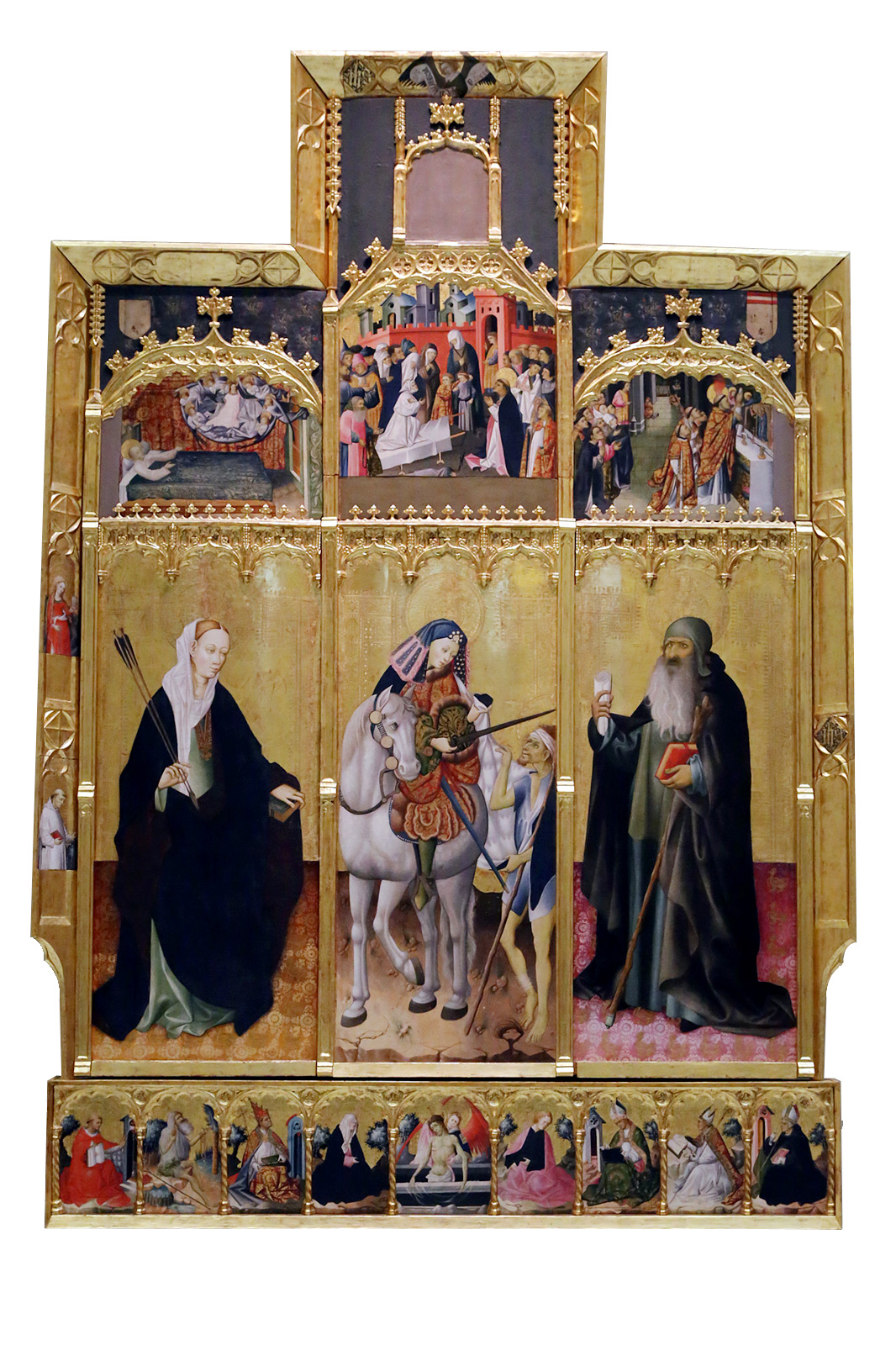
Altarpiece of Saints Ursula, Martin and Anthony, Museu de Belles Arts de Valencia.

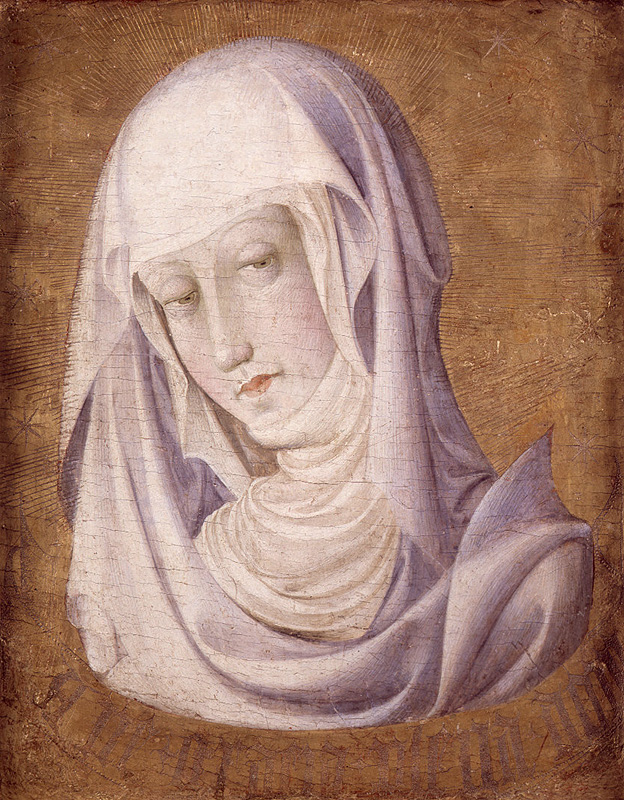
Veronica by Gonzalo Pérez

Gonzalo Pérez, or Gonçal Peris Sarrià, was a Valencian painter of the first half of the 15th century. His life is scarcely documented. He executed altarpieces and devotional paintings in his hometown, Valencia, in the late Gothic style from 1380 and 1451. Also, he worked for altarpiece in Cuenca, Murcia, Ródenas, Burgo de Osma or Puertomingalvo.

Works include:

- Altarpiece of Saints Ursula, Martin and Anthony for the Portaceli Monastery, now in the Museu de Belles Arts de Valencia, Spain.
- Altarpiece of Saint Barbara (Pérez), conserved at MNAC Barcelona, Spain.
- Panel of Saint Martha and Saint Clement, 1412, in the museum of Valencia Cathedral, Spain.
- Altarpiece of Santa María de Gracia de la capilla del Hospital Poma de Puertomingalvo, now in the Nelson-Atkins Museum of Art, Kansas City, Missouri, USA.
- Panel of Virgin and Child Enthroned with Cardinal Alsonso Borja, now in the Museum of Fine Arts, Boston, USA.
- Panel of Saint Bartholomew or San Bartolomé contra el demonio, 1412–1451, now in the Worcester Art Museum, Massachusetts, USA.
- Panel of Madonna and Child on a Throne, 1410–1420, now in the Walters Art Museum, Baltimore, Maryland, USA.
- Panel of Santo Domingo de Guzman y Cuatro Santos, 1405, now in the Museo del Prado, Spain.
- Panel of Coronation of the Virgin with the Trinity, 1400, altarpiece in the church at Rubielos de Mora, Spain, now in the Cleveland Museum of Art, USA.
- Altarpiece of "la vida de Maria", 1420, Rubielos de Mora, Spain.
- Panel of La pietà, 1430, Louvre, France.
- Saint Michael Defeating the Devil in the National Gallery of Scotland, UK.
- Altarpiece of Sant Michael of Murcia Cathedral, Spain.
- Panel La Vierge et l'Enfant entourés d'anges of the altarpiece of Burgo de Osma Cathedral, now in the Louvre, France
