= Altarpiece of Saint Barbara (Pérez) =

Polyptych by Gonzalo Pérez

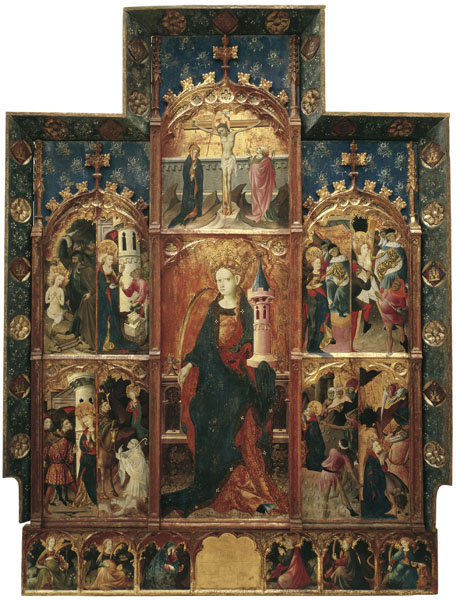
- Artist: Gonzalo Pérez
- Year: c. 1410–1425
- Type: Tempera and gold leaf on wood
- Dimensions: 278 cm × 207.7 cm × 17 cm (109 in × 81.8 in × 6.7 in)
- Location: Museu Nacional d'Art de Catalunya; Barcelona

The Altarpiece of Saint Barbara is a painting by Gonzalo Pérez (Gonçal Peris Sarrià) in the Museu Nacional d'Art de Catalunya in Barcelona.

== Description ==
=== Theme ===
The altarpiece features the image of Saint Barbara as the central figure. She holds in her right hand a palm frond, symbolizing martyrdom. Her left hand holds a tower, central to the story of her imprisonment. Above this central image is a scene of Calvary, depicting Christ with his mother and his disciple John. The walled background is representative of the walls of Jerusalem. Four panels in the side compartments depict eight scenes of the saint's life and passion. These scenes were later described in the 1486 medieval Catalan manuscript, Jardinet d'Orats.

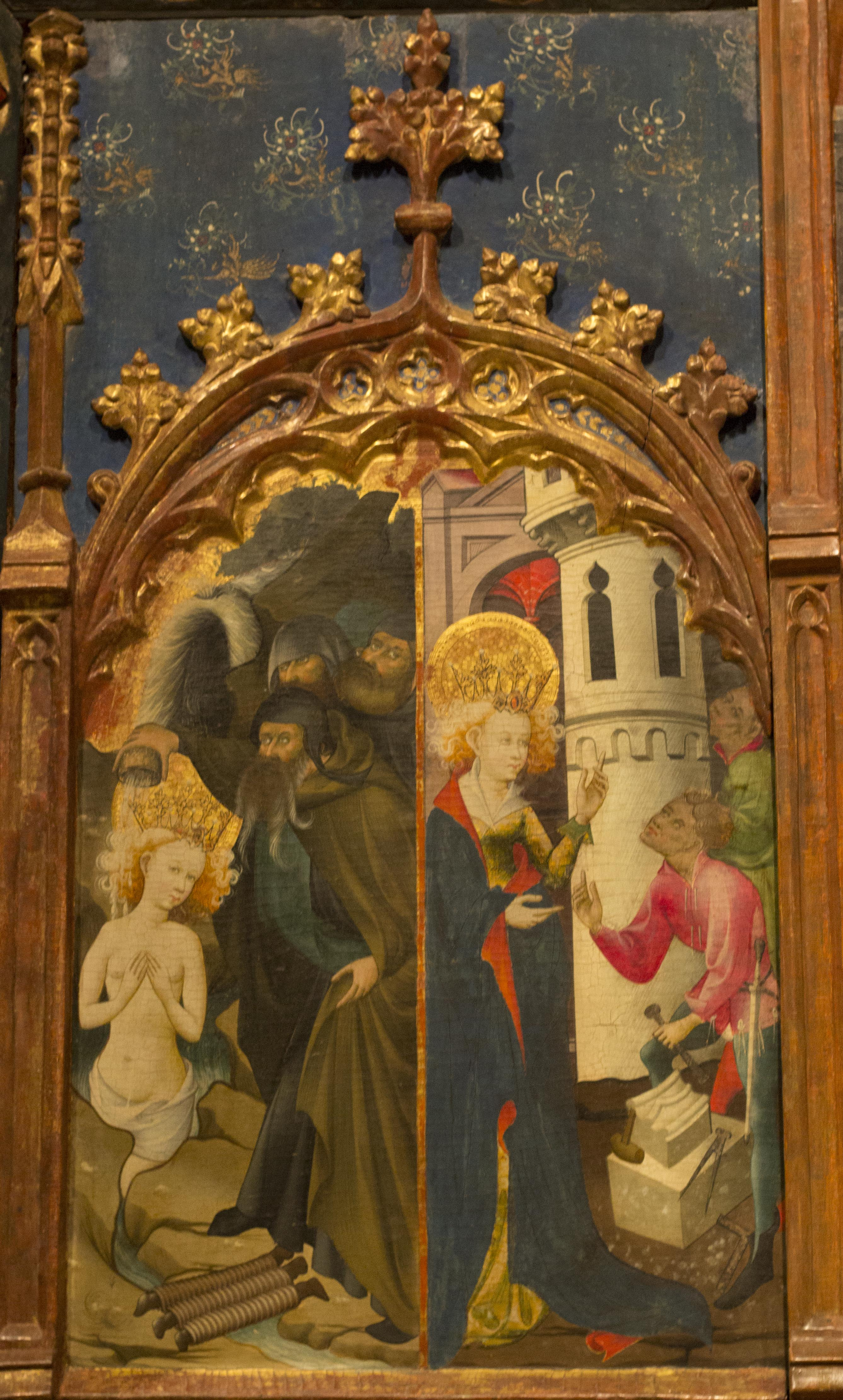
Upper left panel: Saint Barbara is baptized and the representation of the Holy Trinity

The panel on the top left shows Saint Barbara's baptism in a holy stream. There is also a scene showing Barbara in front of the tower her tyrannical father, Dioscorus, began constructing in order to confine her. She is giving directions to the builder to add a third window to the building. For Saint Barbara, this was a way to represent the Holy Trinity.

Below this, in the bottom left panel, Dioscorus learns about his daughter's acceptance of the new faith and threatens her with a sword. This causes Barbara to run away to the forest. Her father pursues her and her location is given away by a pastor. He is punished for this deed by being turned into stone.

The panel on the top right narrates the torments inflicted on Saint Barbara. She was taken to the Praetor after her capture and sentenced to death after torture. The right side of the panel illustrates her breasts being pulled.

The bottom right panel depicts two additional scenes. Barbara is being stoned by a group of males on the left, and on the right, she is beheaded by her father, the king. At the same time, the king and his accomplice are seen to be the target of a lightning strike and Barbara's soul is welcomed by an angel.

The horizontal bank of small portraits depict religious figures. From left to right these are: Saint Ursula, Saint Luke, a grieving Mary, Saint John the Evangelist, Saint Margaret, and Saint Catherine.

=== Artist ===
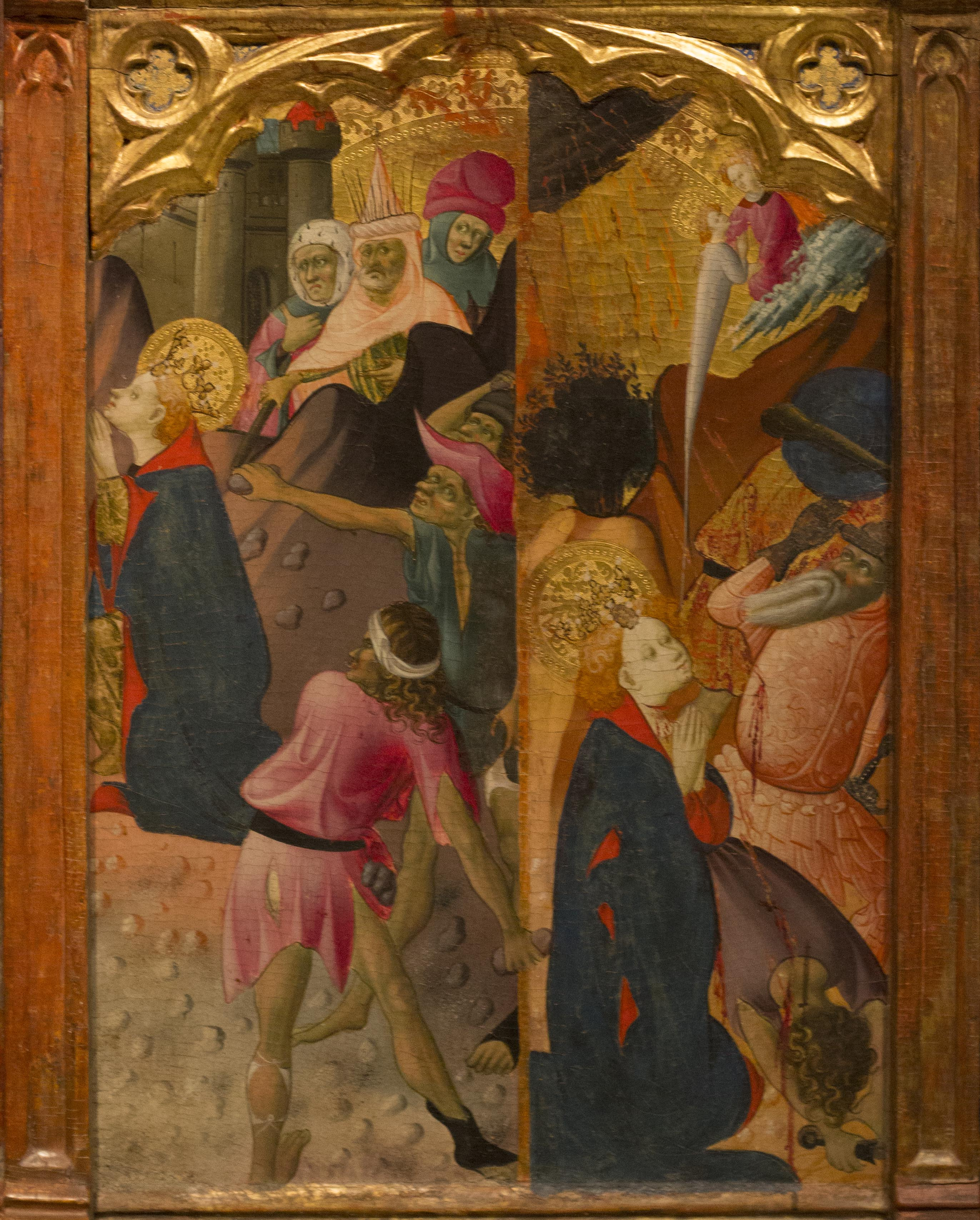
Lower right panel: Saint Barbara is stoned, then beheaded by her father.

This altarpiece is attributed to the painter Gonzalo Pérez, one of the chief representatives of Valencian International Gothic. His style is marked by expressive and picturesque elements, flowing lines and the charm of the colour. Gonzalo came from a family of painters living in the city of Turia in the 13th century. He was trained in the workshop of Pere Nicolau. Upon his death, Gonzalo was charged to manage the assets of his teacher. He had a successful workshop during this time.

=== International Gothic Style ===
Gothic painting followed Romanesque painting as a predominant style between the thirteenth and fifteenth centuries. Similar to the Romanesque style, Gothic paintings were centered on religious figures. However, the new style related subject matter more closely to its audience, preferring to put more focus on the human element. From 1400 onward, this expanded to the International Gothic style, which is showcased in the Altarpiece of Saint Barbara. The approach drew inspiration from painters in Florence and Siena. The International Gothic style uses sophistication, refinement, and luxury, which reflects the condition of the European courts of the time, and Valencia became a center for international artwork which produced an exchange of diverse traditions.

=== Origin ===
The painting originated in the town of Puertomingalvo, a municipality in the province of Teruel, Aragon, Spain. This information comes from photographs taken by antique archaeologist and scholar Juan Cabre, between 1908 and 1910 of the altarpiece within the Puertomingalvo parish church. Other evidence of this location is found on preserved photographic prints showcasing the iconographic repertoire of Spain.
