= Museu de Belles Arts de València =

Museum of Fine Arts of Valencia
- Museu de Belles Arts de València
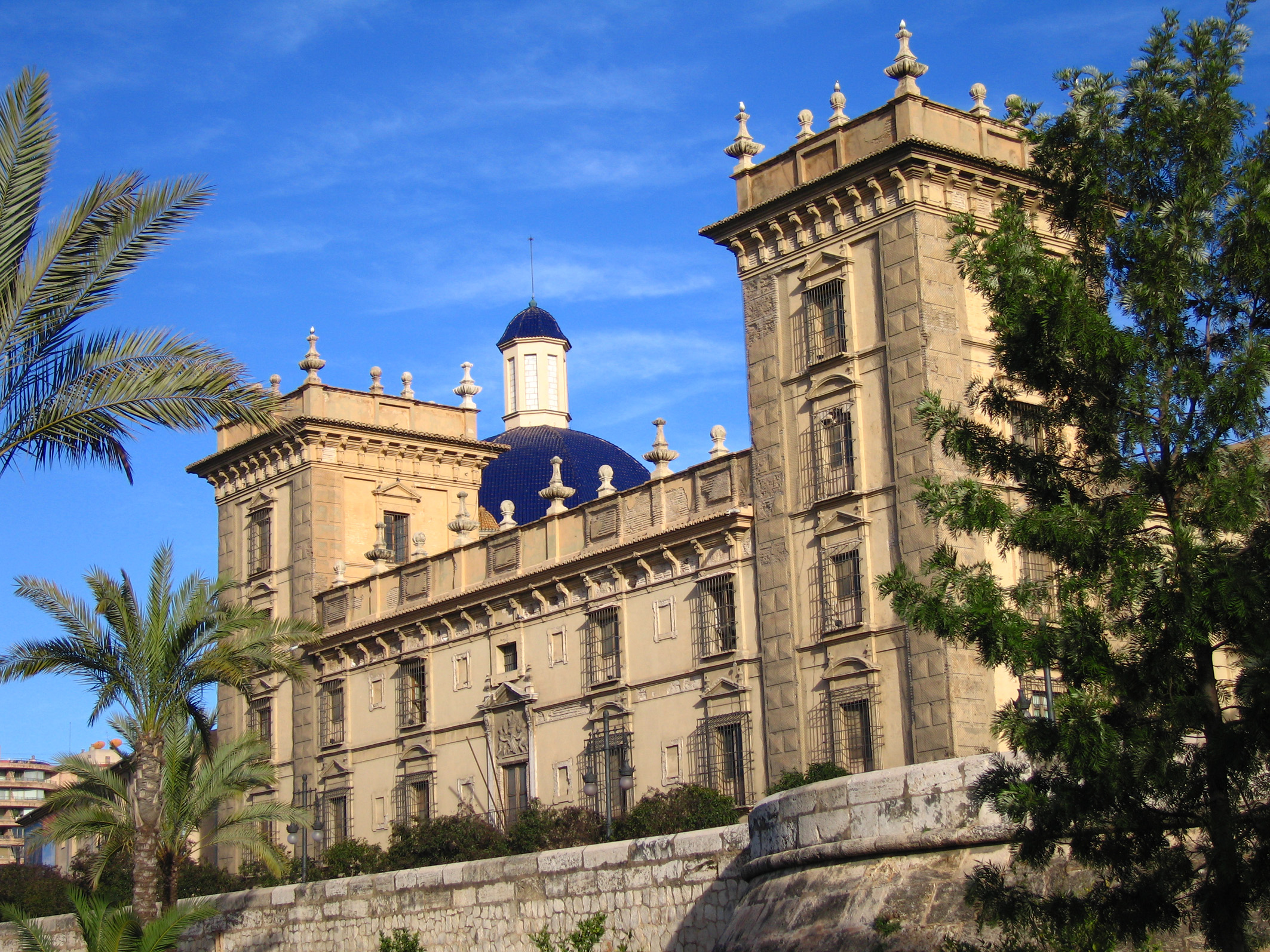
- External view of the museum
- Established: 24 July 1913
- Location: 9 San Pío V street – Valencia, (Spain)
- Coordinates: 39.479°N 0.371°W
- Type: Art museum
- Curator: Generalitat Valenciana
- Website: museobellasartesvalencia.gva.es

The Museu de Belles Arts de València (Valencian pronunciation: [muˈzɛw ðe ˈbeʎez ˈaɾdz de vaˈlensi.a]; Spanish: Museo de Bellas Artes de Valencia; English: "Museum of Fine Arts of Valencia") is an art gallery in Valencia, Spain, founded in 1913. It houses some 2,000 works, most dating from the 14th–17th centuries, including a Self portrait of Diego Velázquez, a St. John the Baptist by El Greco, Goya's Playing Children, Gonzalo Pérez's Altarpiece of Sts. Ursula, Martin and Antony and a Madonna with Writing Child and Bishop by the Italian Renaissance master Pinturicchio. It houses a large series of engravings by Giovan Battista Piranesi.

The museum is in the St. Pius V Palace, built in the 17th–18th centuries. It has also sections dedicated to sculpture, to contemporary art and to archaeological findings.

== Artworks ==
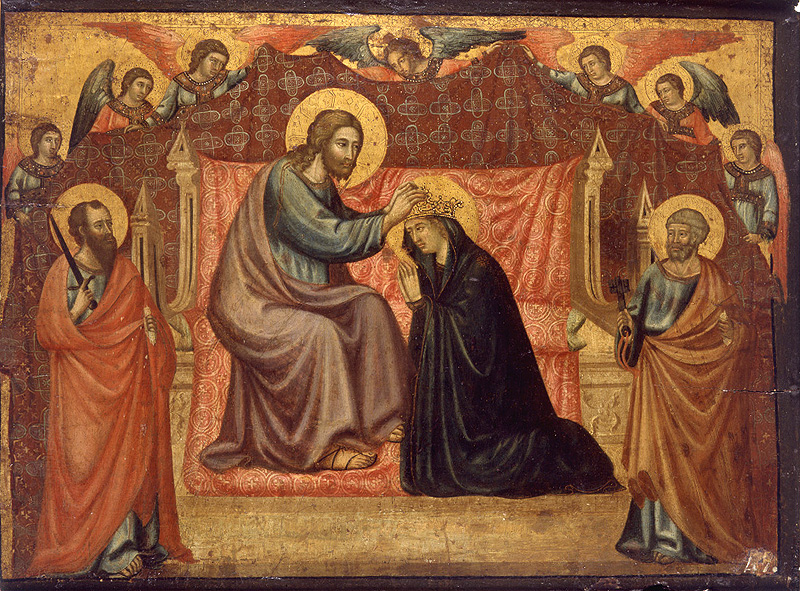
Coronación de la Virgen en presencia de San Pedro y San Pablo. Unknown master.

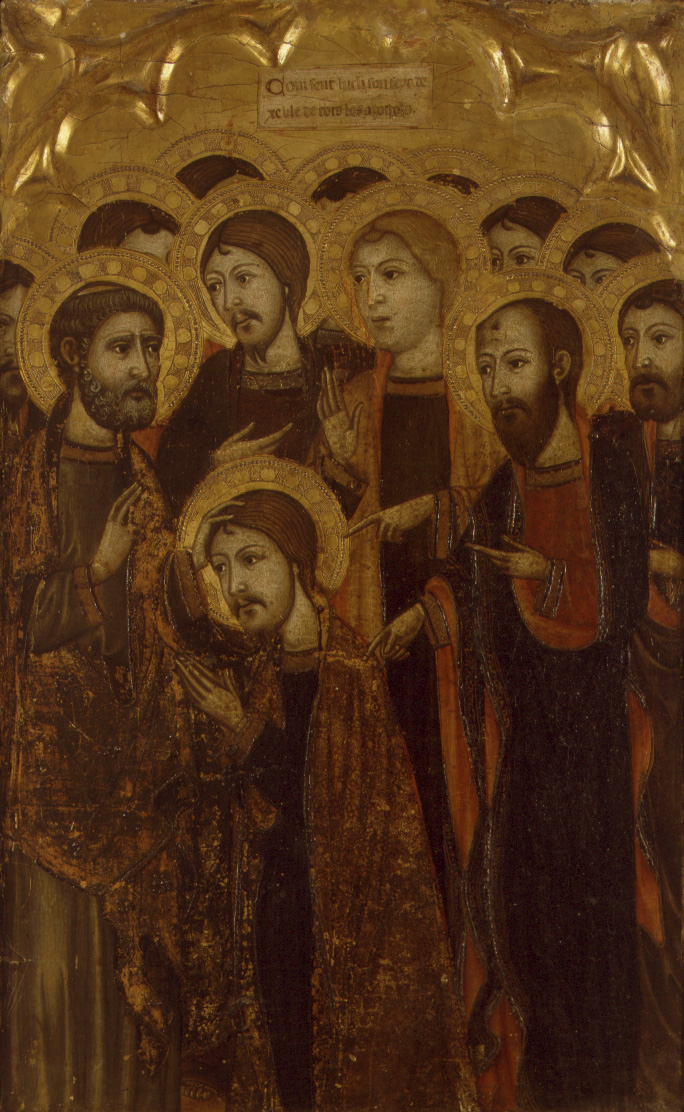
San Lucas incorporado al Colegio Apostólico. Unknown master.

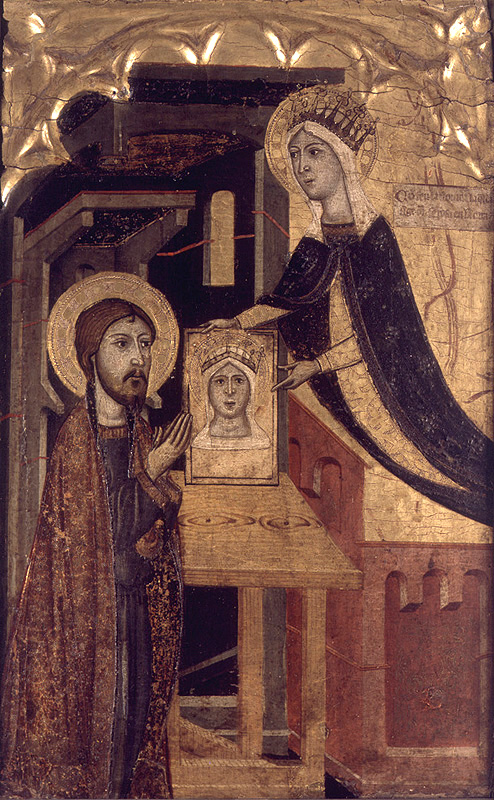
San Lucas recibiendo de la Virgen su Verónica. Unknown master.

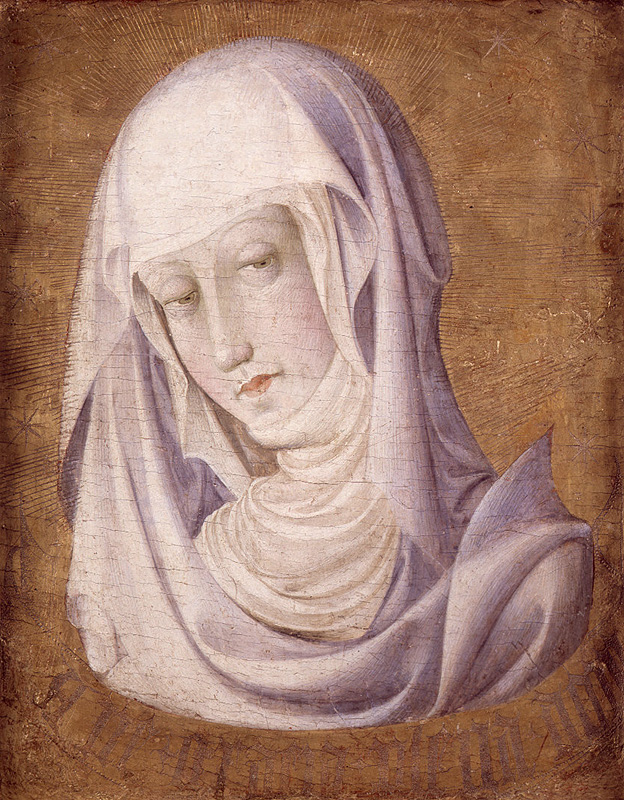
Verònica. Gonzalo Pérez.

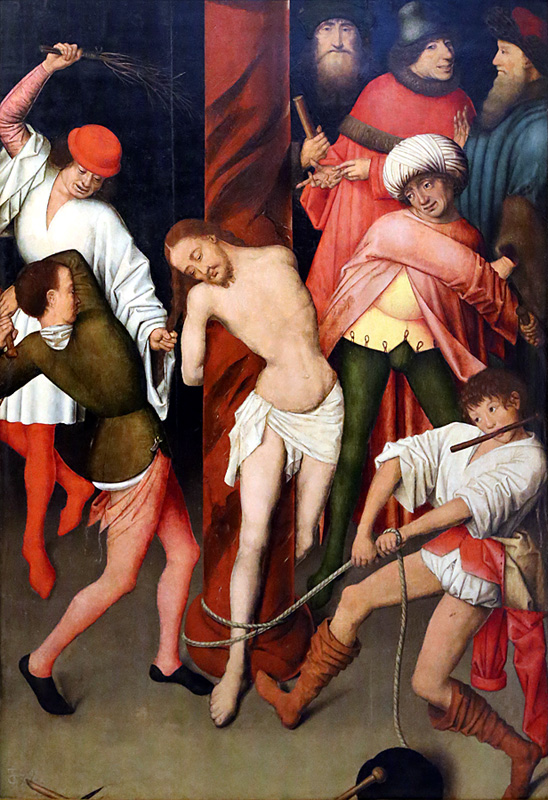
The Flagellation. Vrancke van der Stockt.

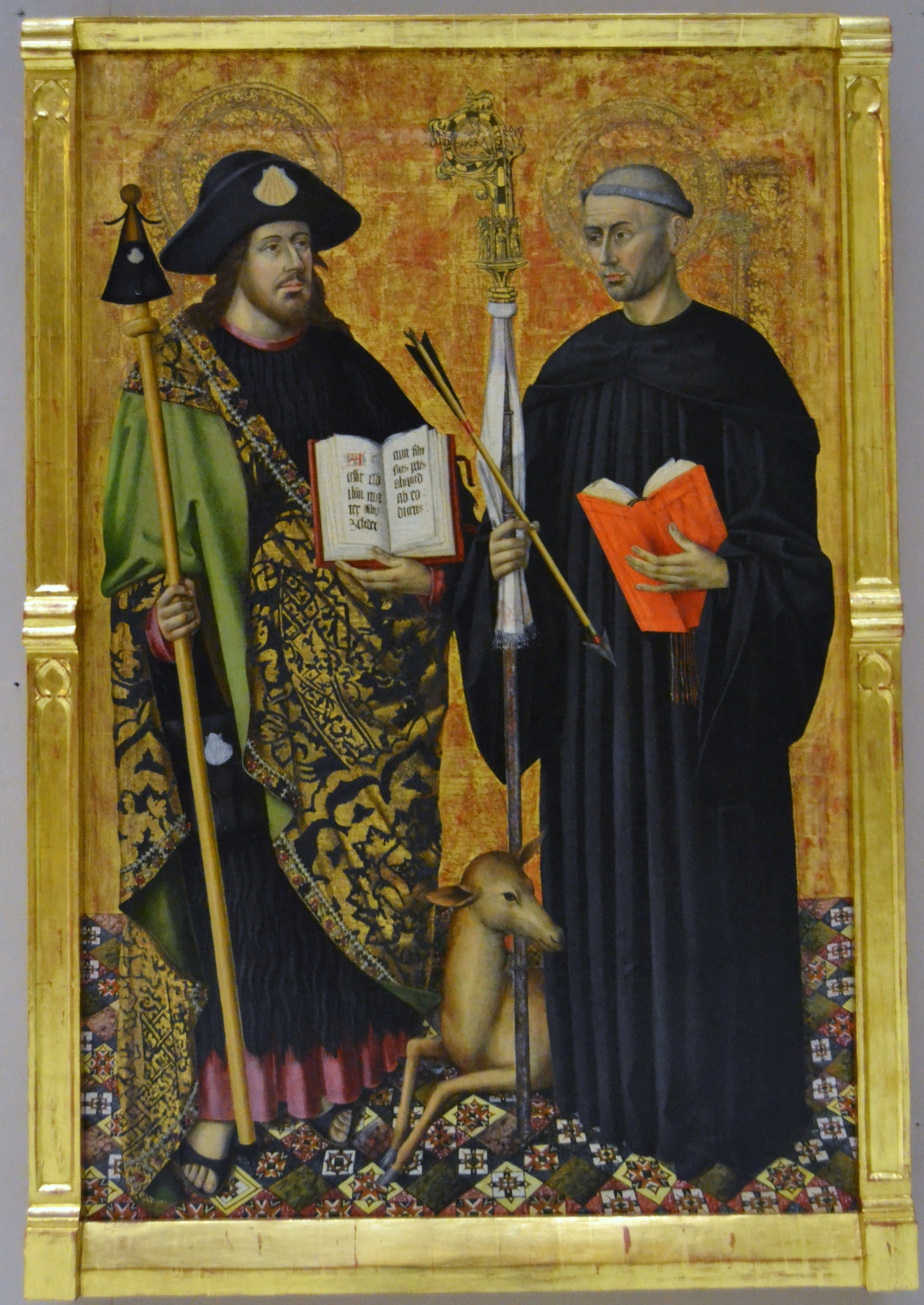
St James and St Giles Abad. Jacomart.

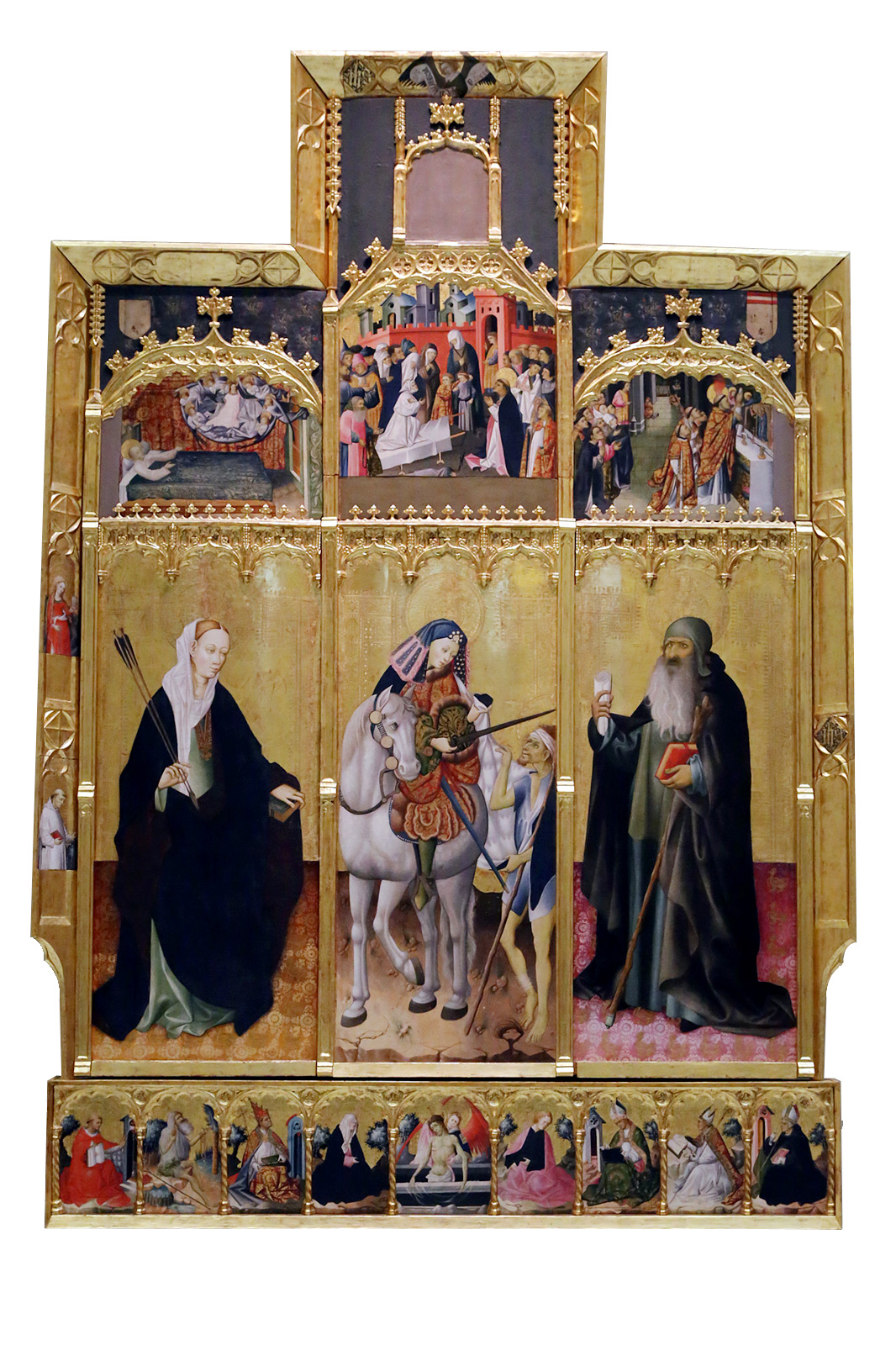
Altarpiece of Saints Ursula, Martin and Anthony. Gonzalo Pérez.

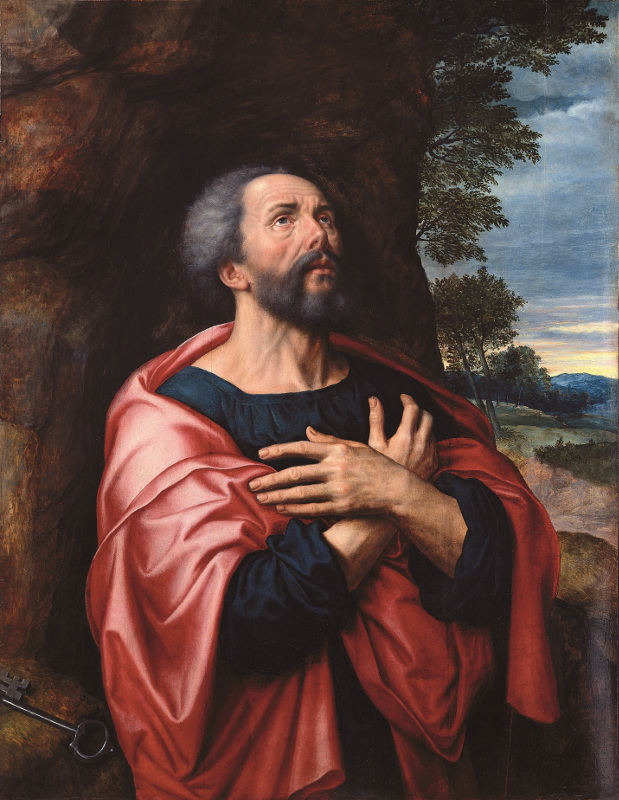
St Peter. Michiel Coxie.

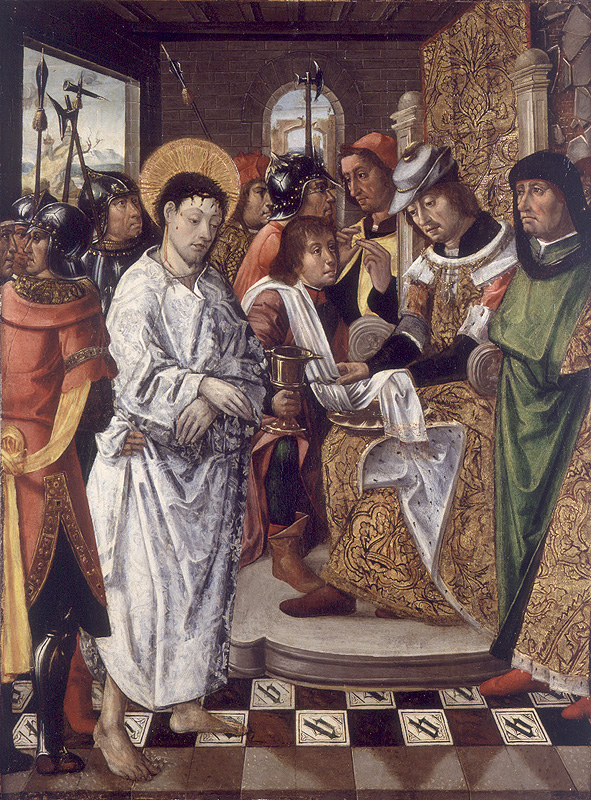
Cristo ante Pilatos.Francisco de Osona.

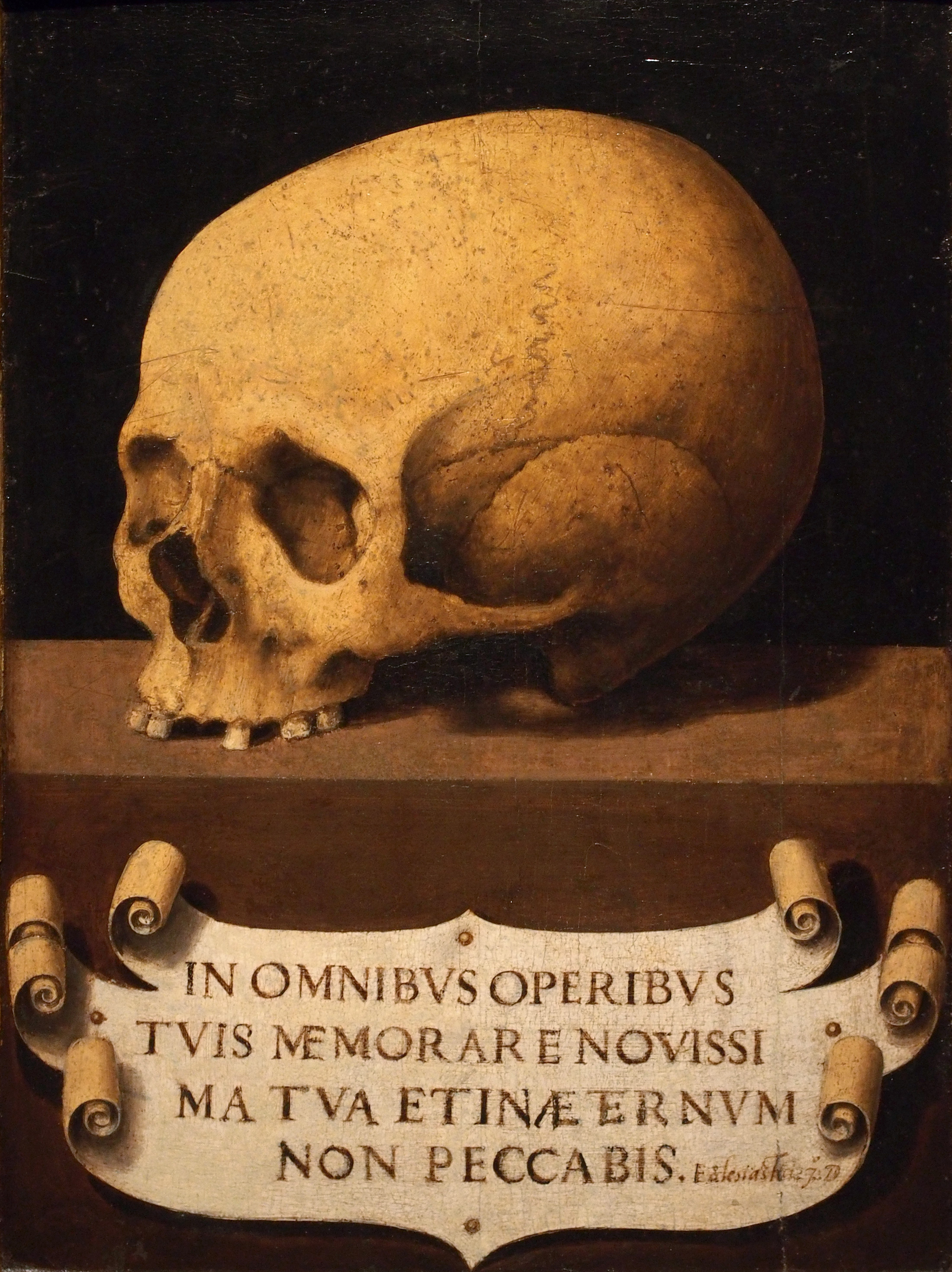
Calavera (Memento Mori). Vicente Masip.

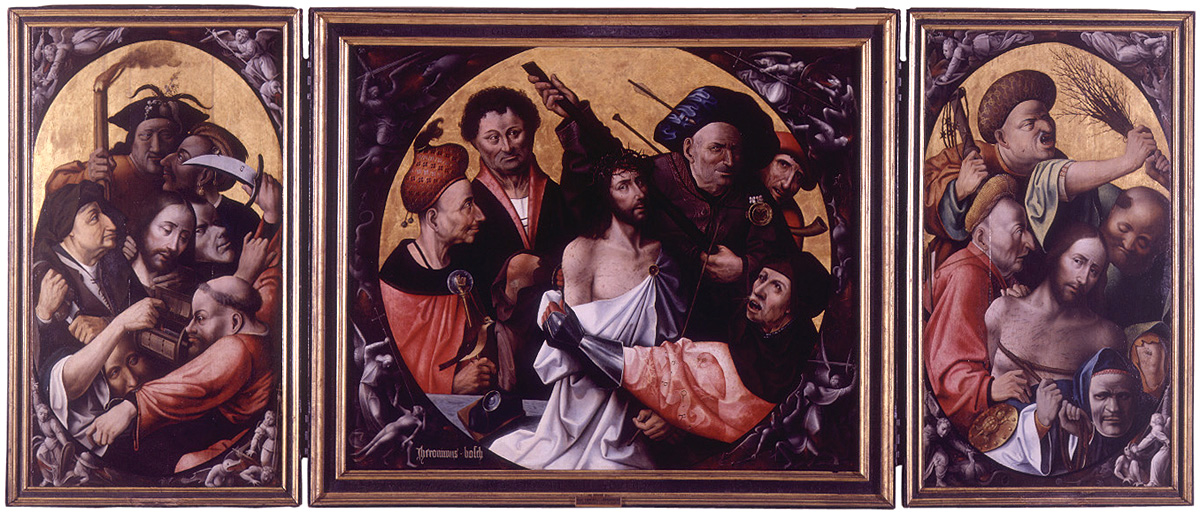
Passion Triptych. Follower of Hieronymus Bosch.

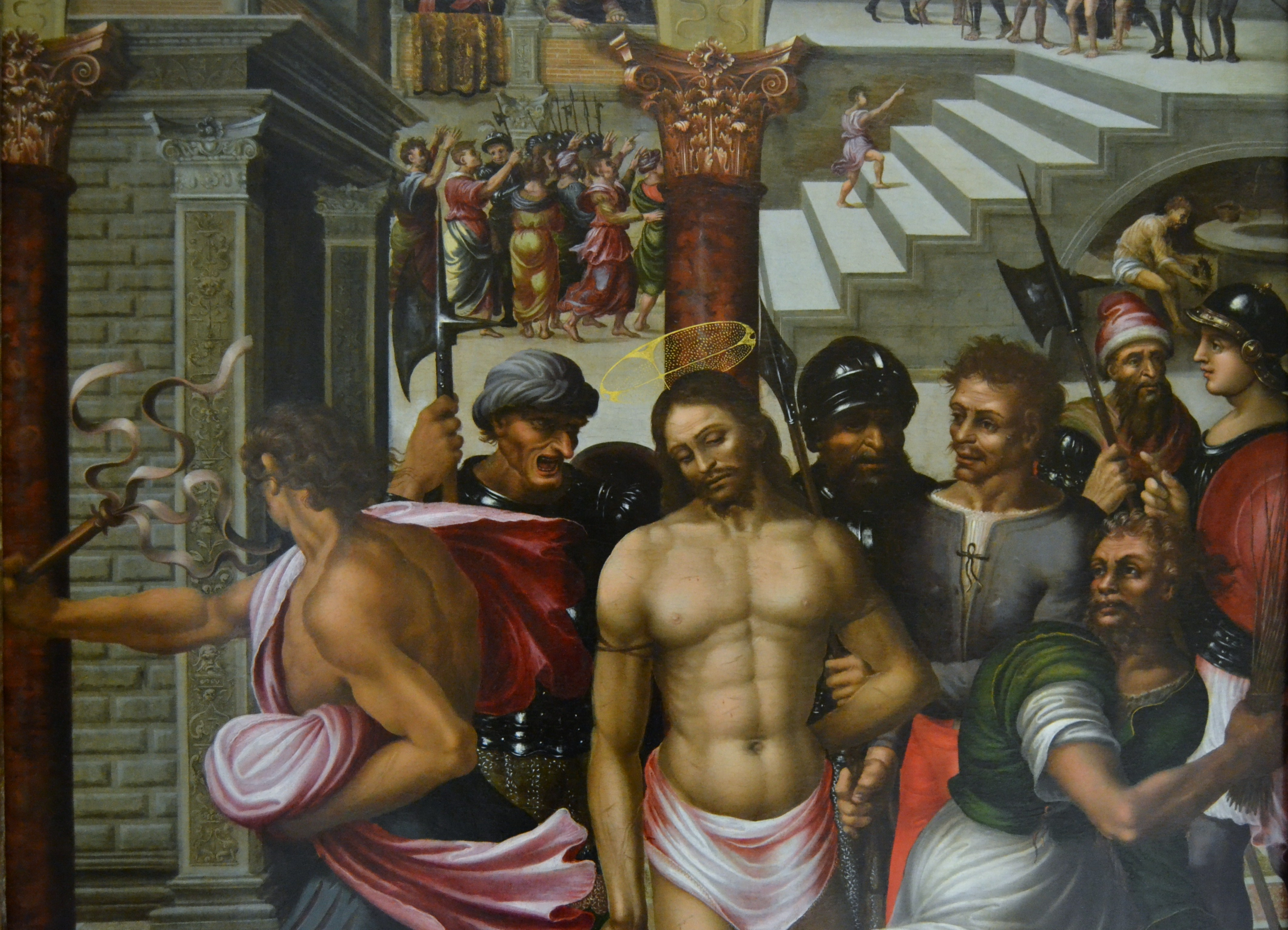
Flagellation. Hernando de los Llanos.

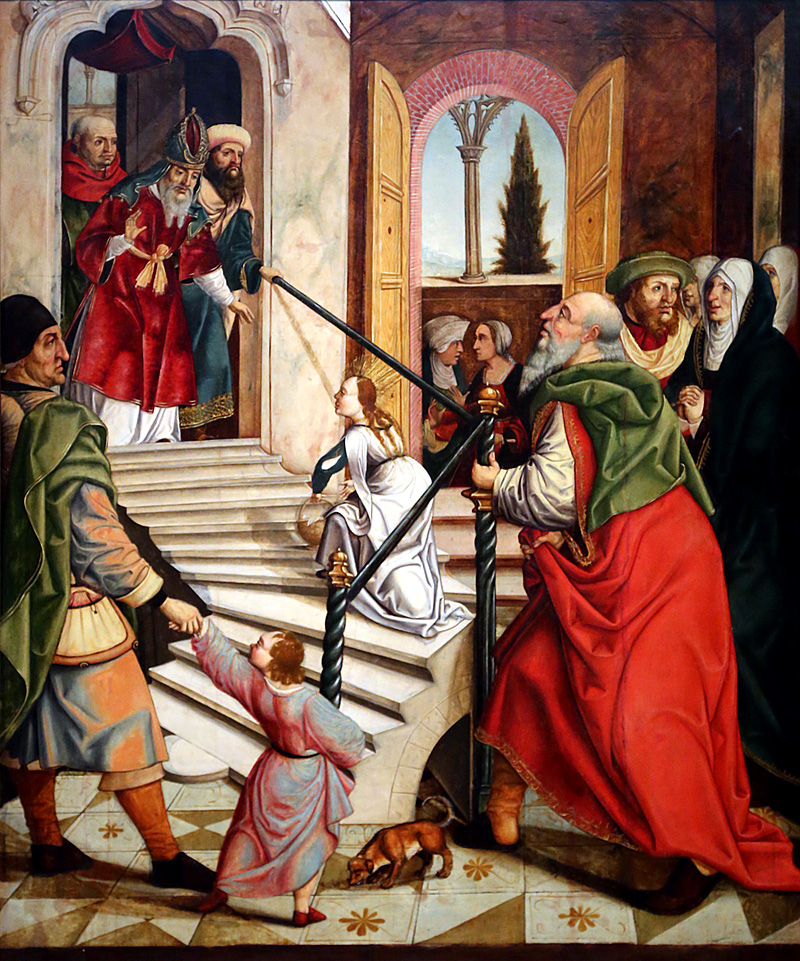
Presentation of the Virgin to the Temple. Calzada Master.

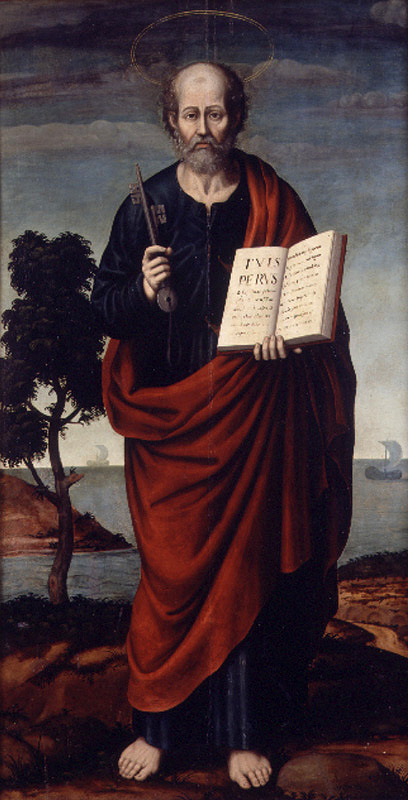
San Pedro. Nicolas Borras.

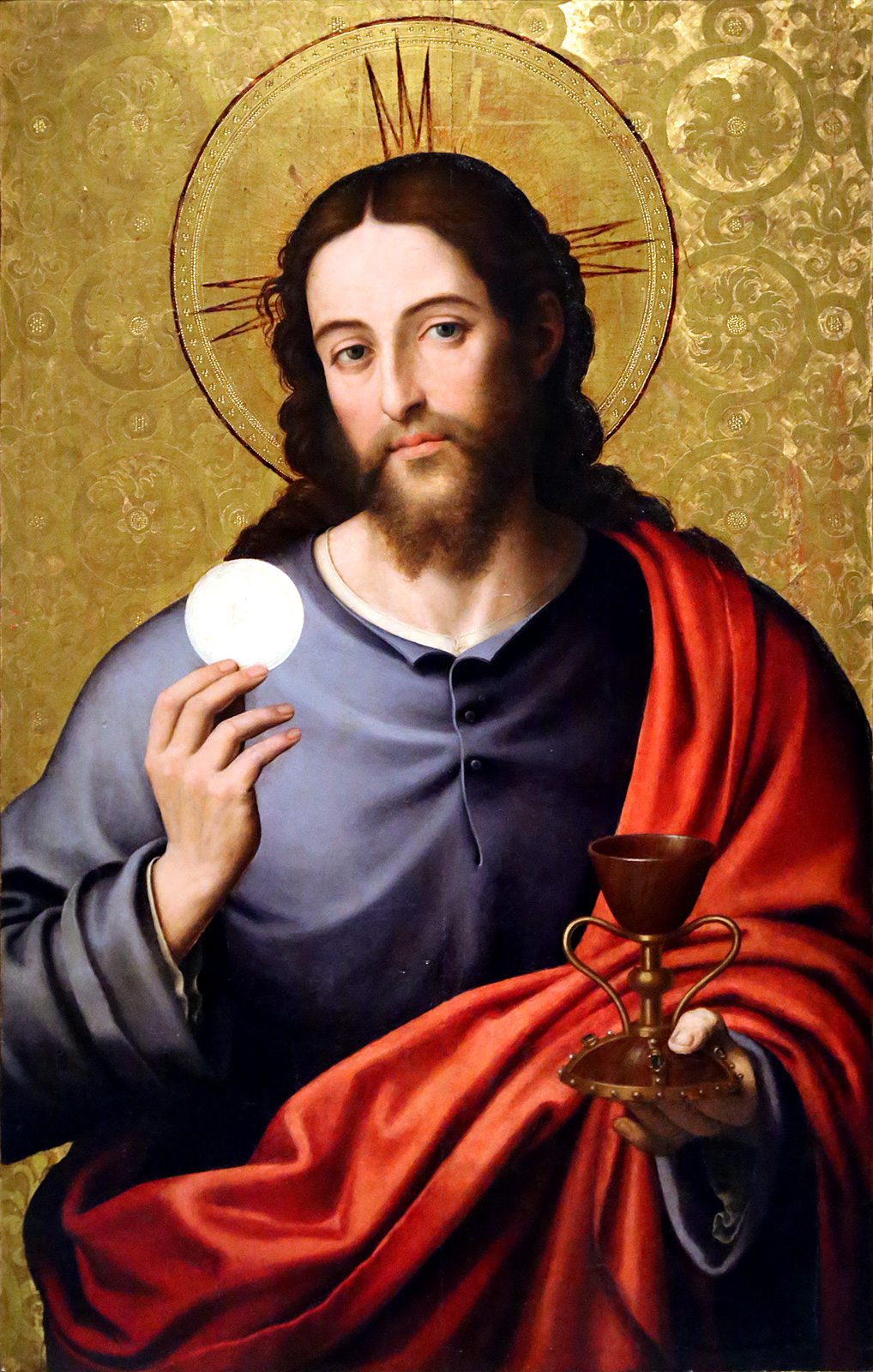
Christ the Saviour. Juan de Juanes.

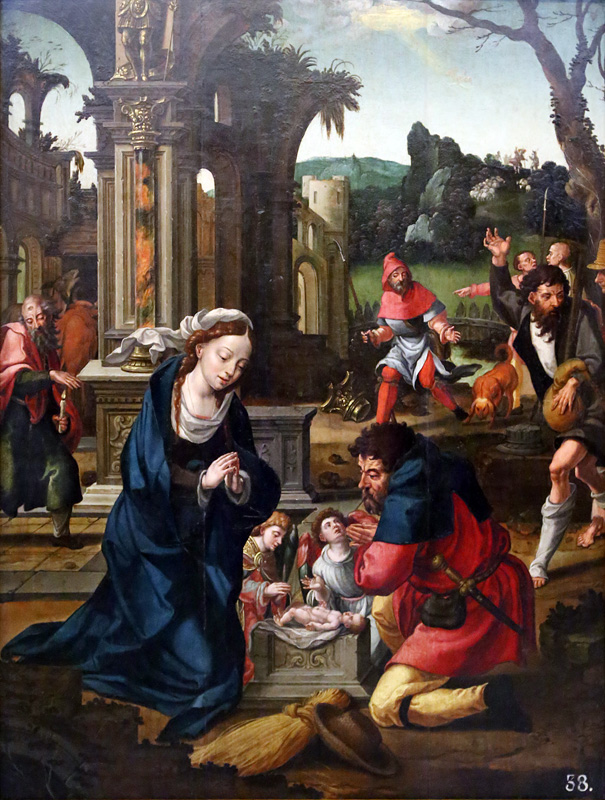
The Adoration of the Shepherds. Pieter Coecke van Aelst.

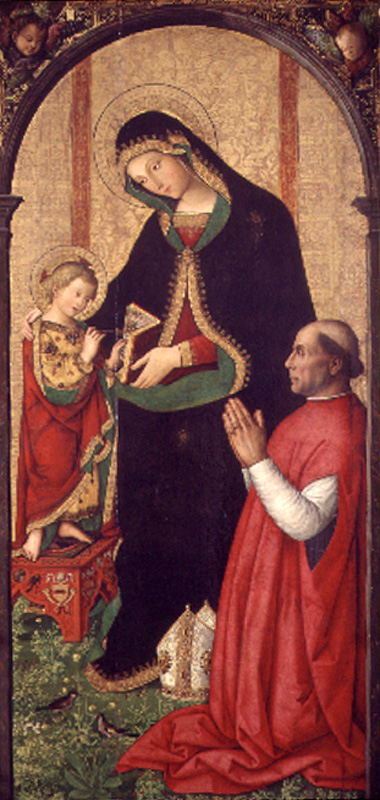
Madonna and Child with a Bishop. Pinturicchio.

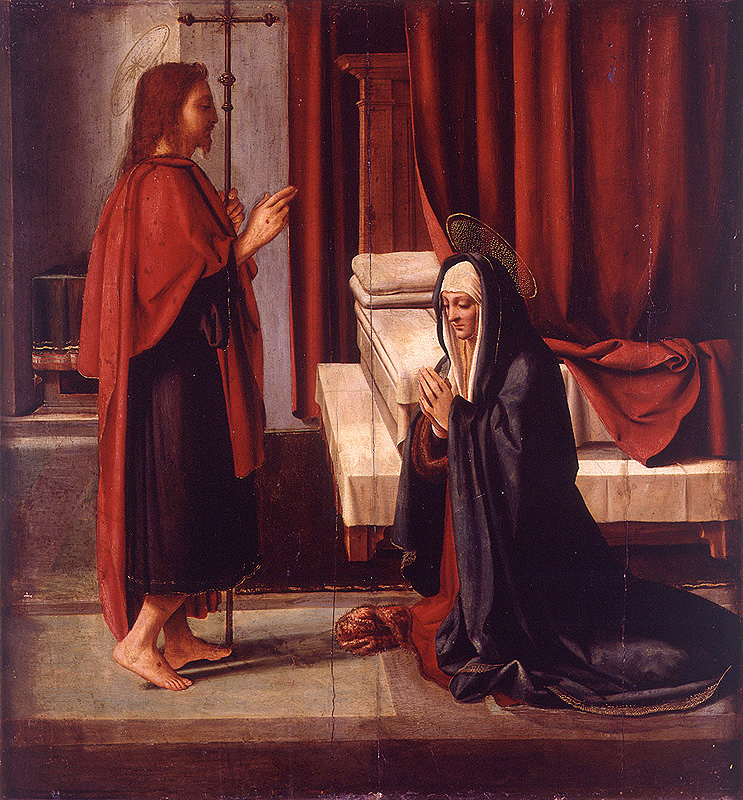
Aparición de Cristo resucitado a la Virgen. Fernando Yanez de la Almedina.

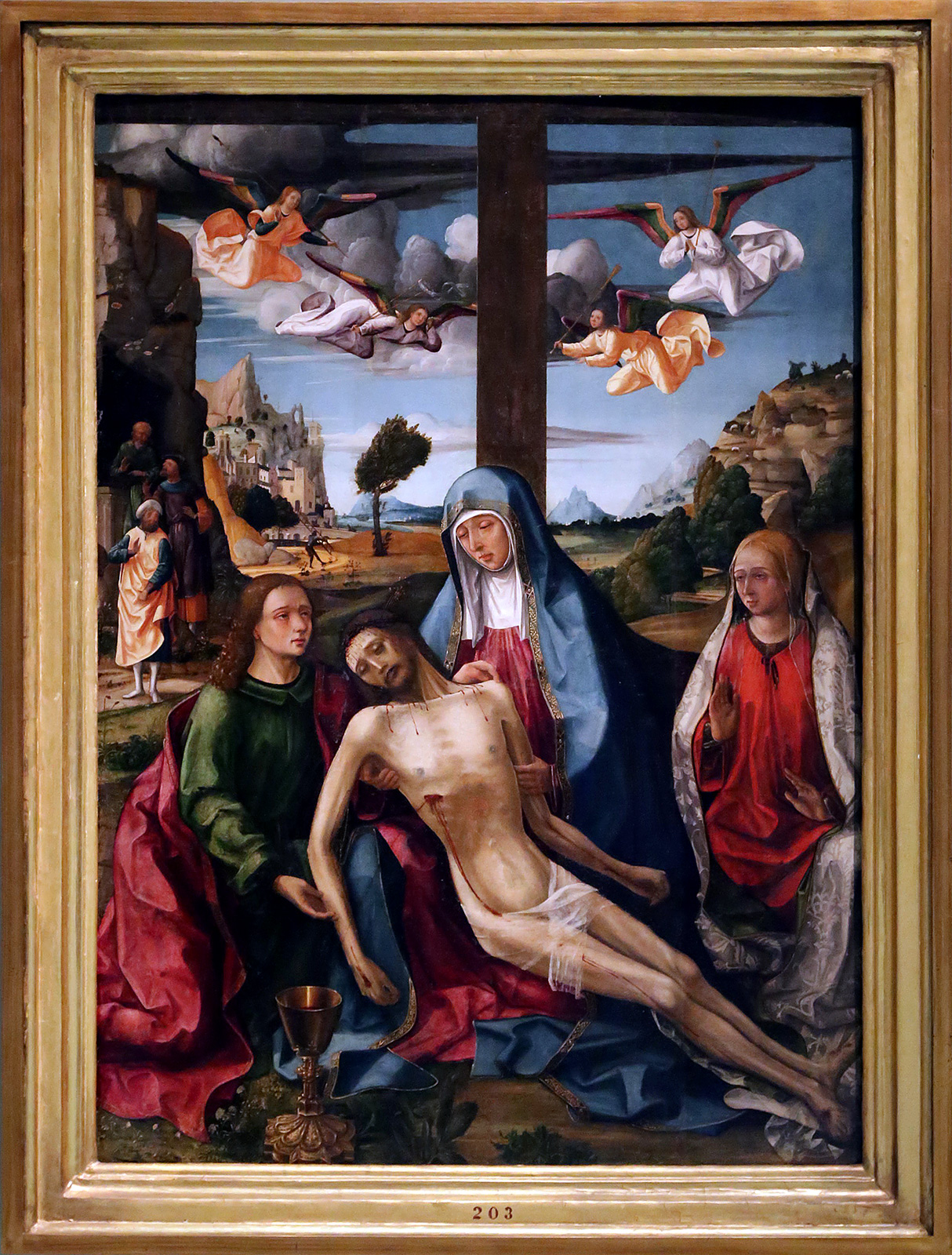
Pietà. Master of Artes.

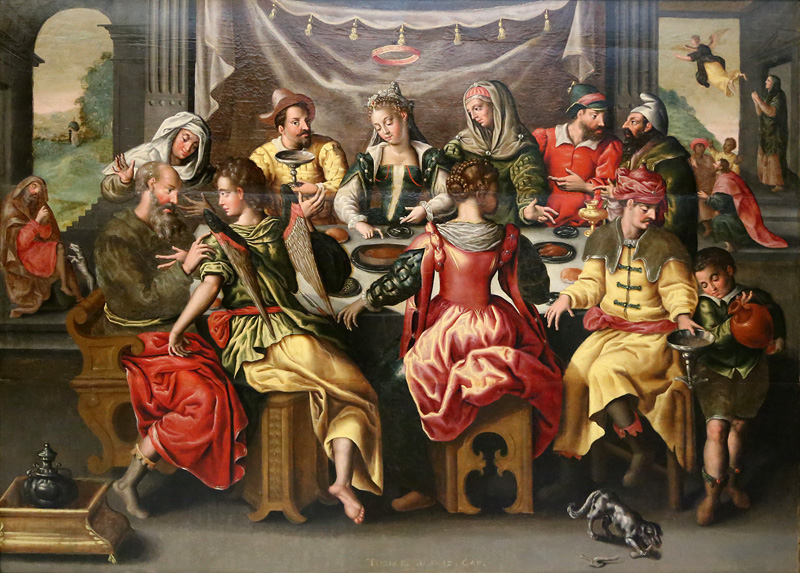
The Marriage of Tobias and Sarah. Circle of Maerten de Vos.

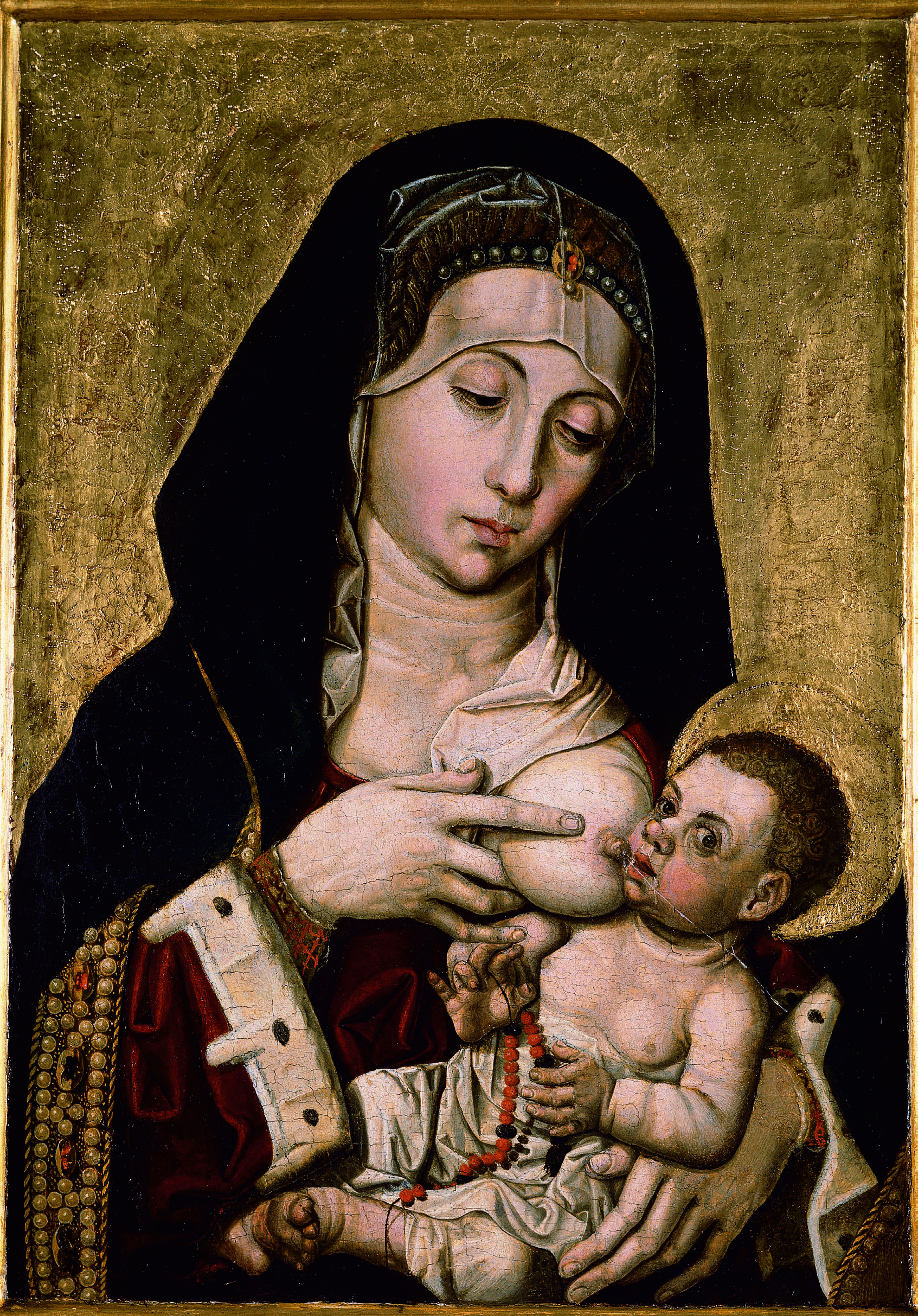
Nursing Madonna. Bartolomé Bermejo.

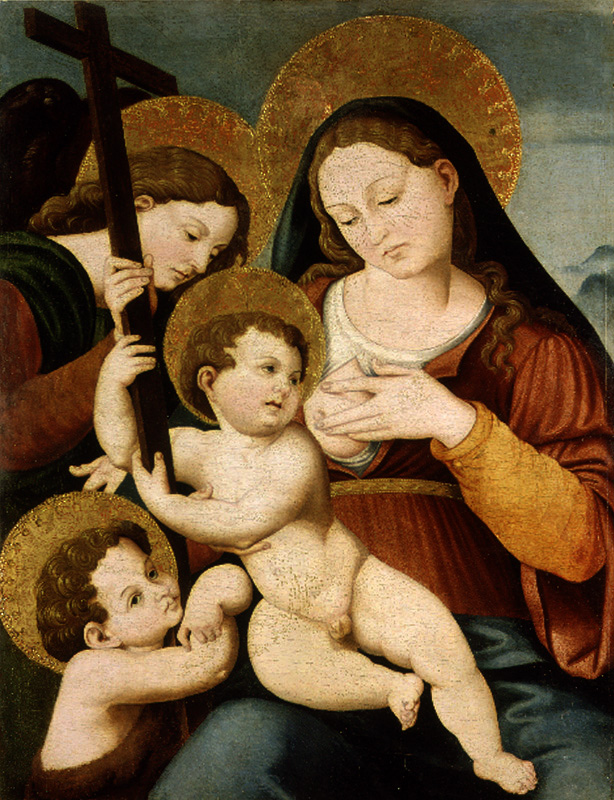
Virgen de la Leche con el niño Jesús, San Juanito y un Ángel. Vincente Juan Macip.

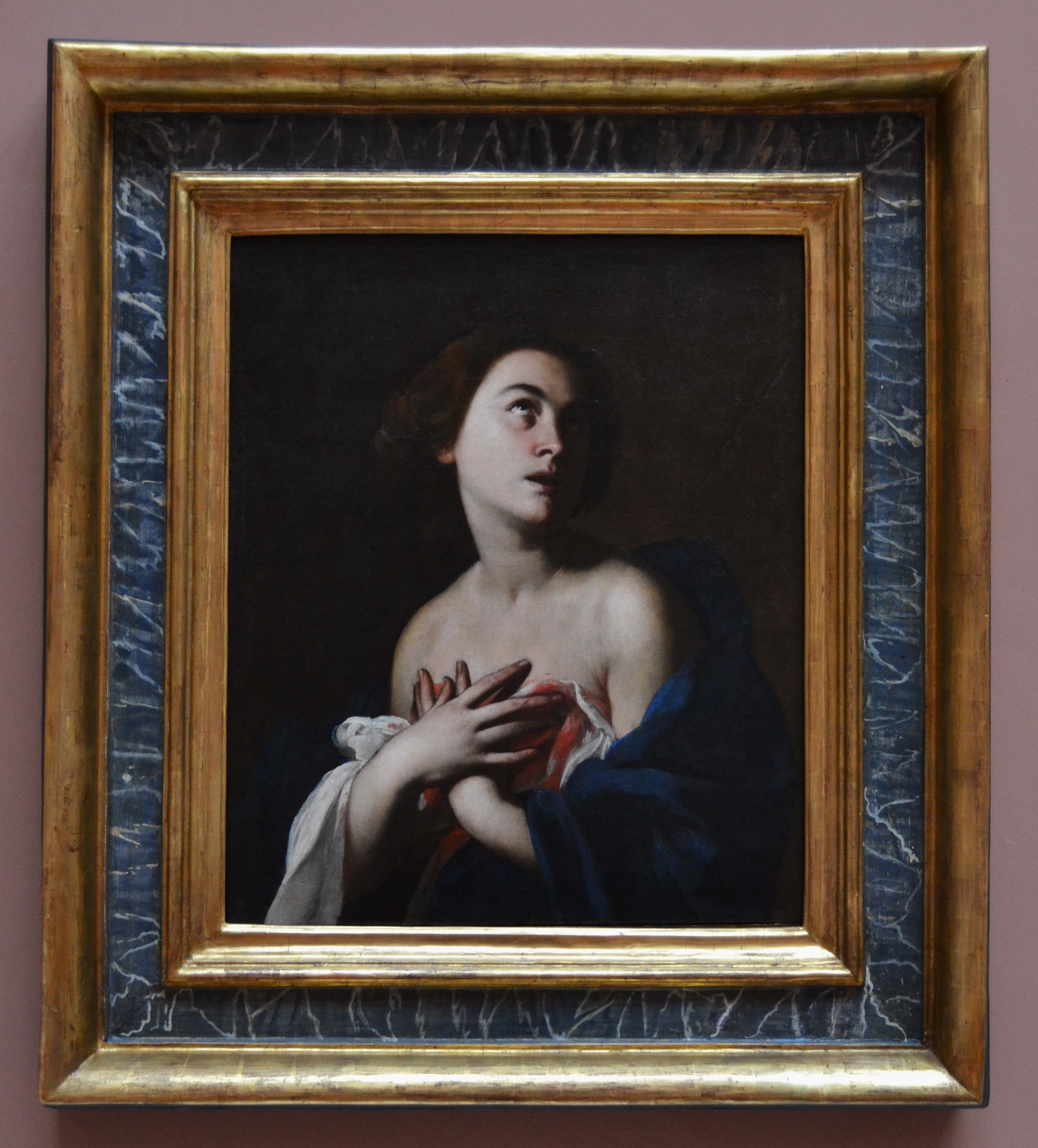
Saint Agata. Massimo Stanzione.

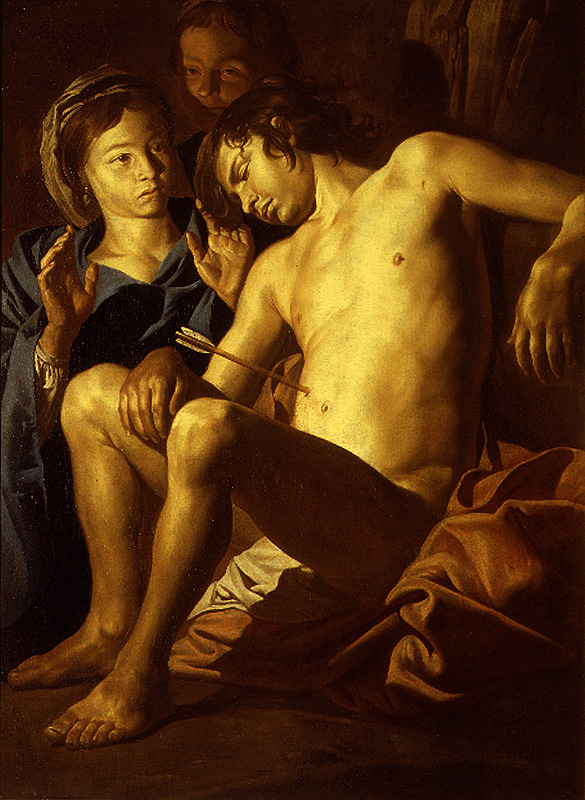
Saint Sebastian tended by Saint Irene and a Maid. Matthias Stom.

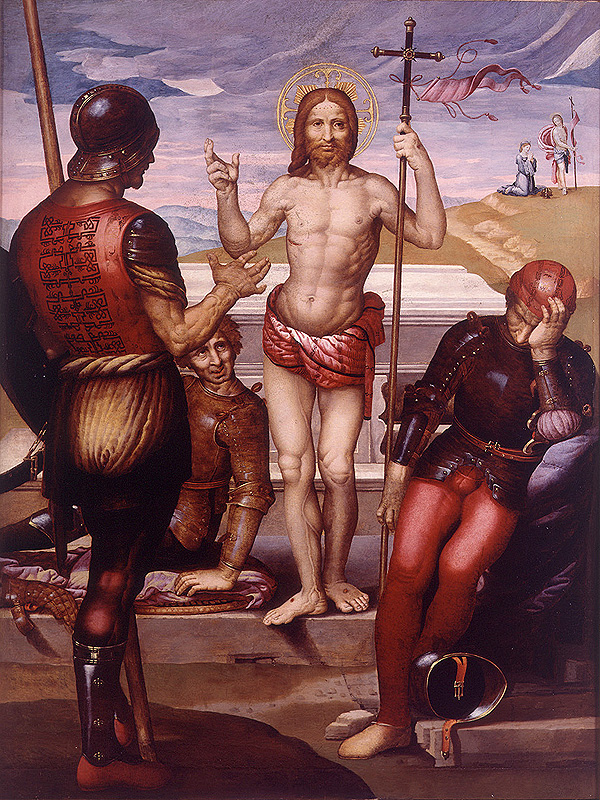
Resurrección de Cristo. Fernando Yanez de la Almedina.

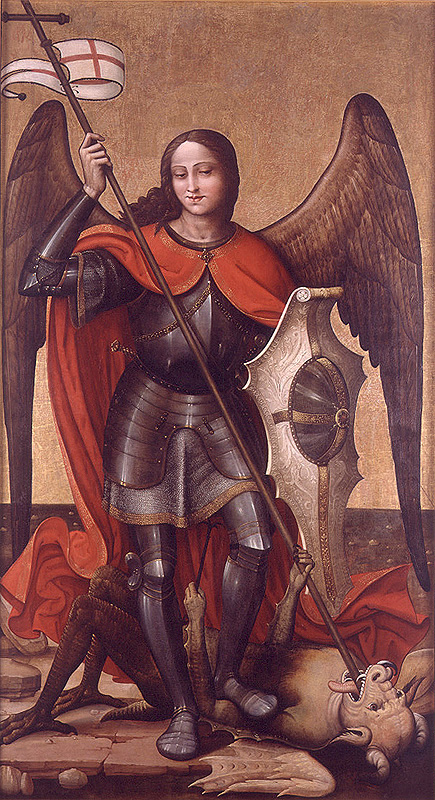
St. Michael the Archangel. Miguel Esteve.

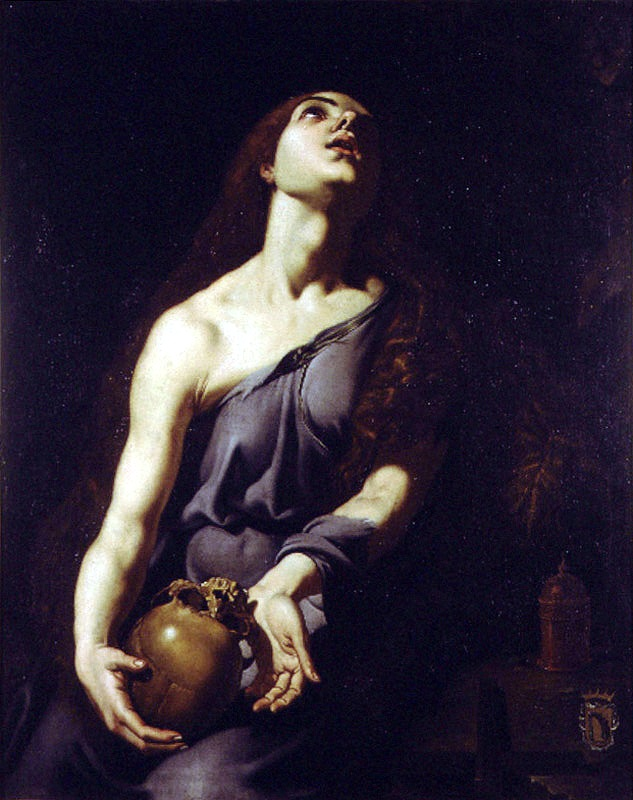
Santa Maria Magdalena. Jerónimo Jacinto de Espinosa.

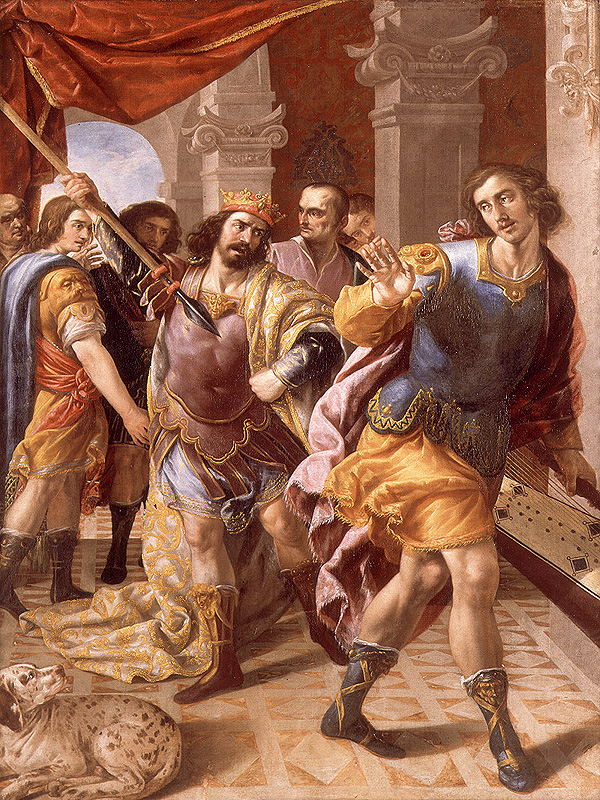
Saul atentando contra David. Francisco Fernández.

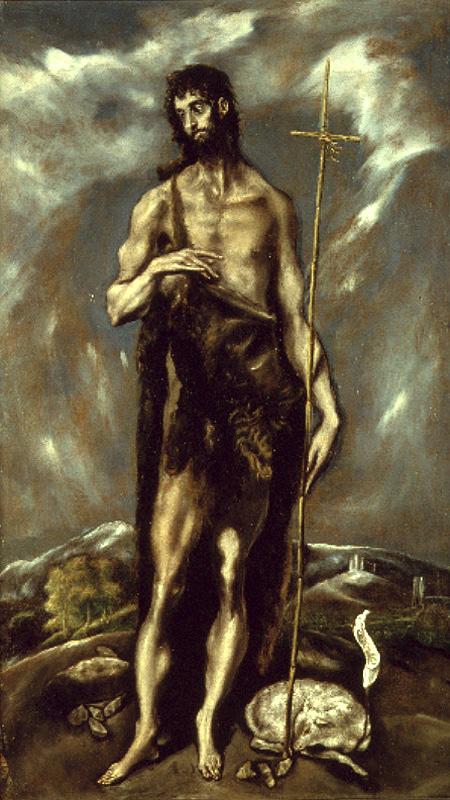
Saint John the Baptist. El Greco.

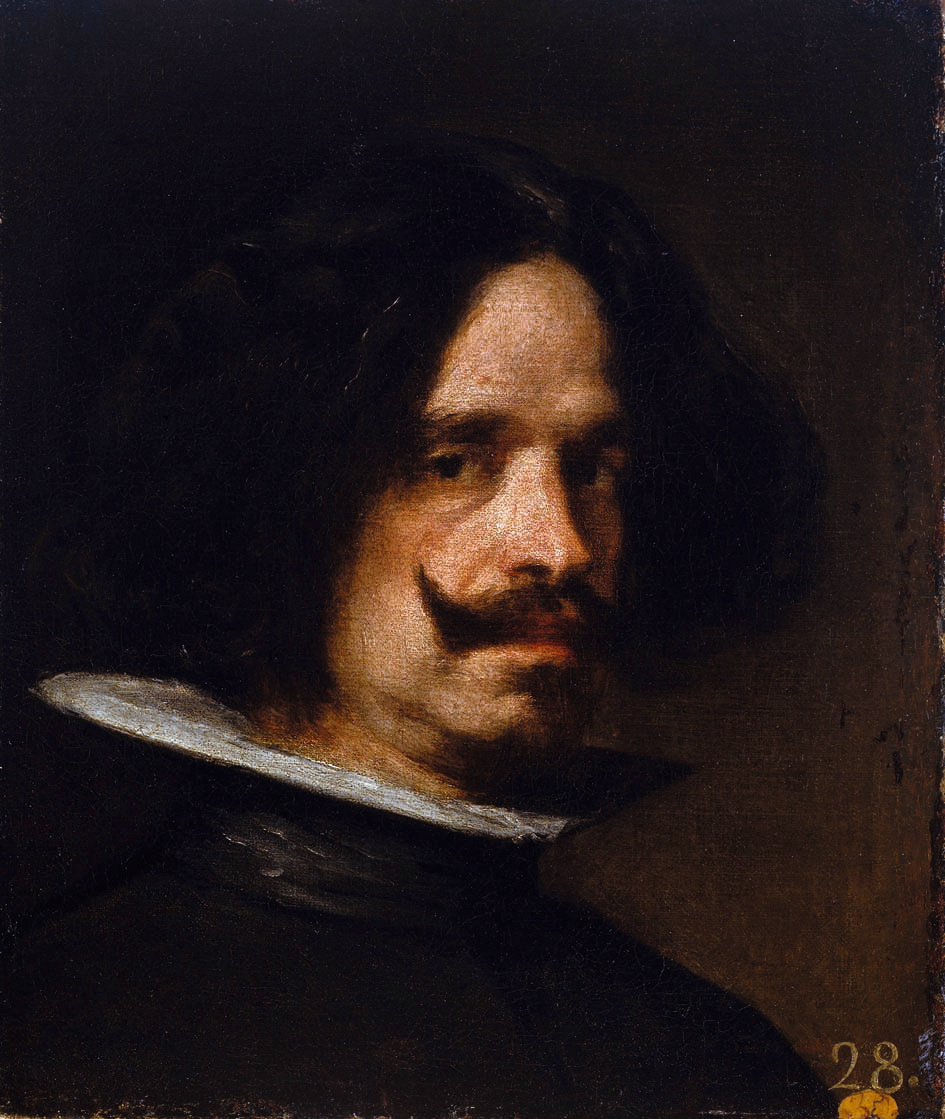
Self Portrait. Diego Velázquez.

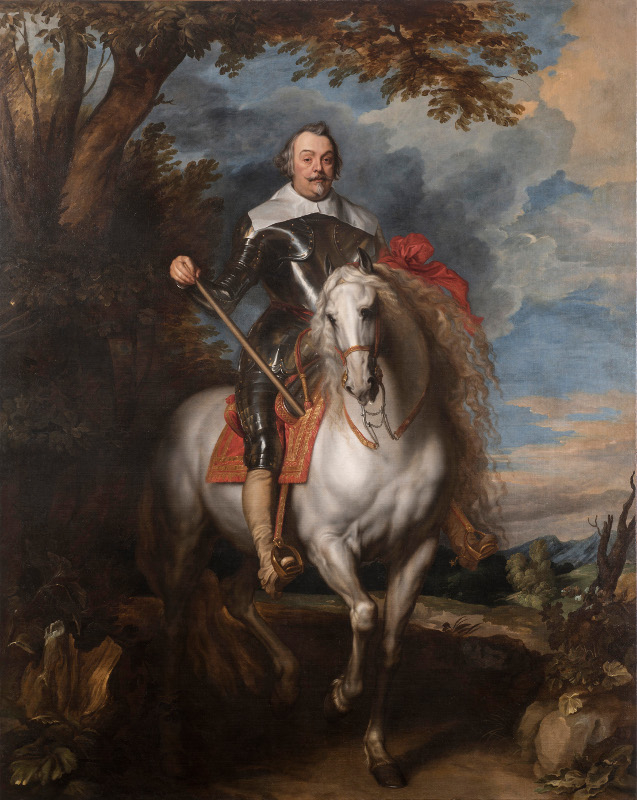
Equestrian portrait of Francisco de Moncada. Anthony van Dyck.

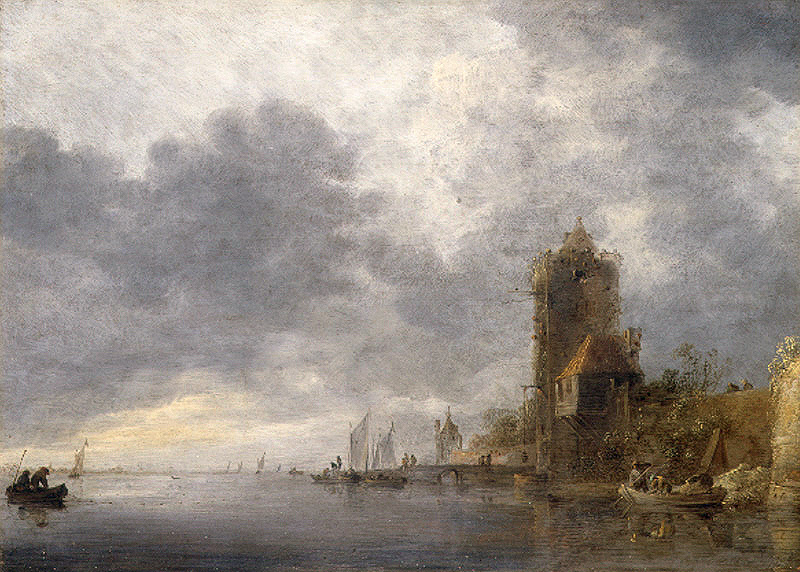
Marina con torre y barcas. Jan van Goyen.

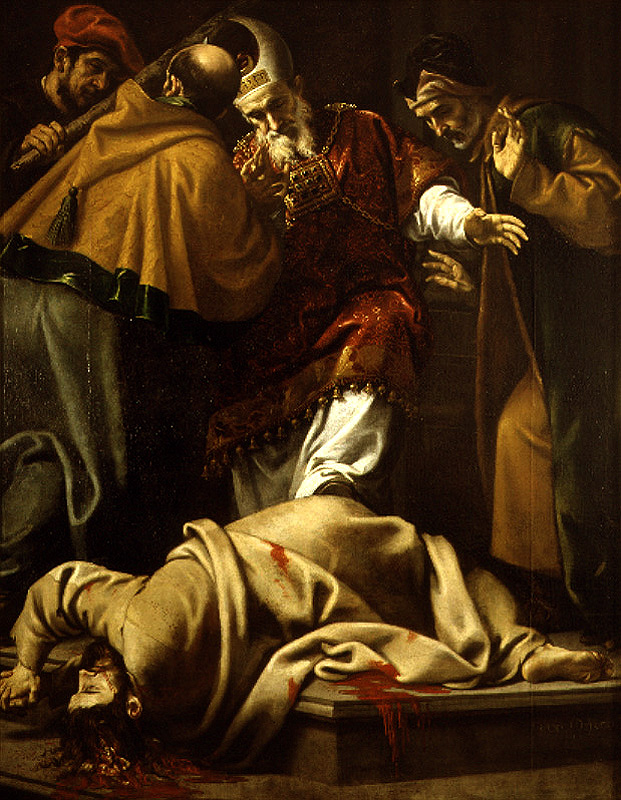
Martyrdom of Saint James the Less. Pedro Orrente.

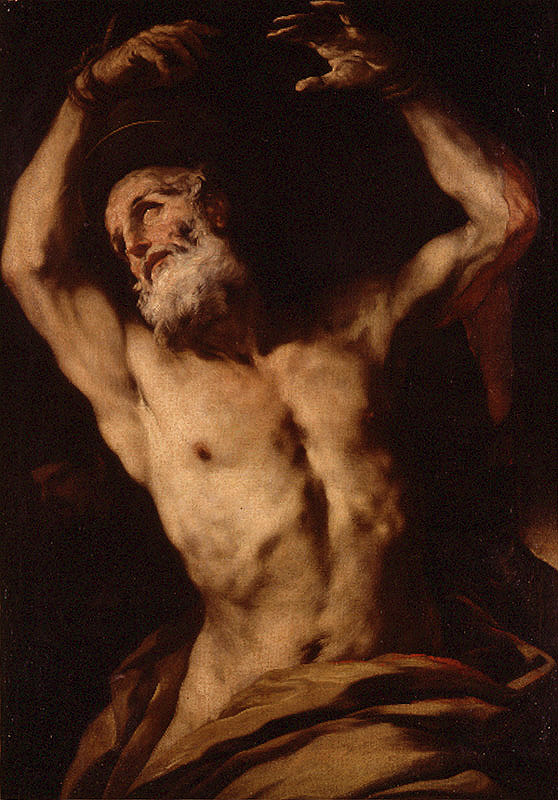
Martirio de San Bartolomé. Luca Giordano.

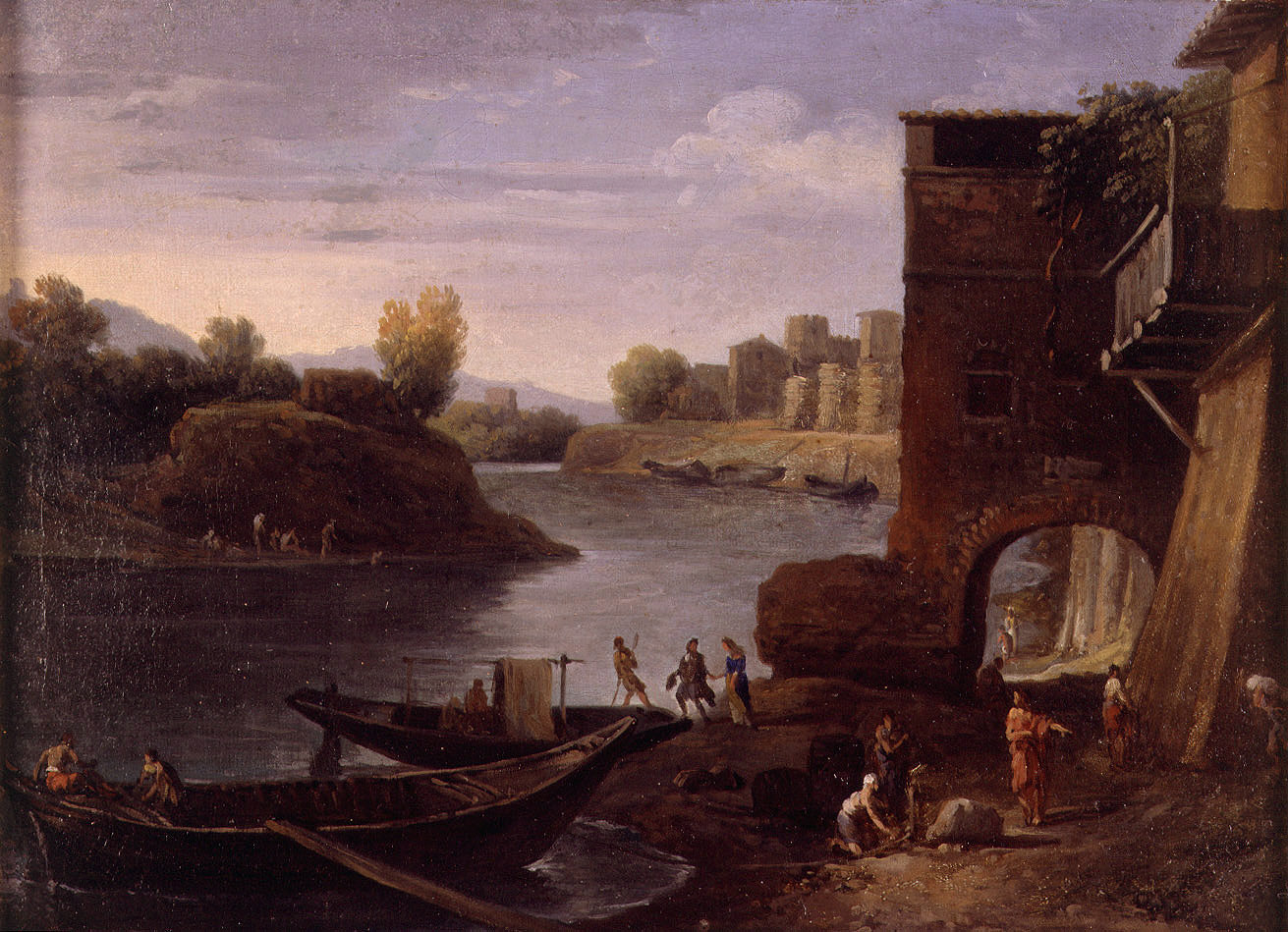
Embarcadero. Circle of Adrien Manglard.

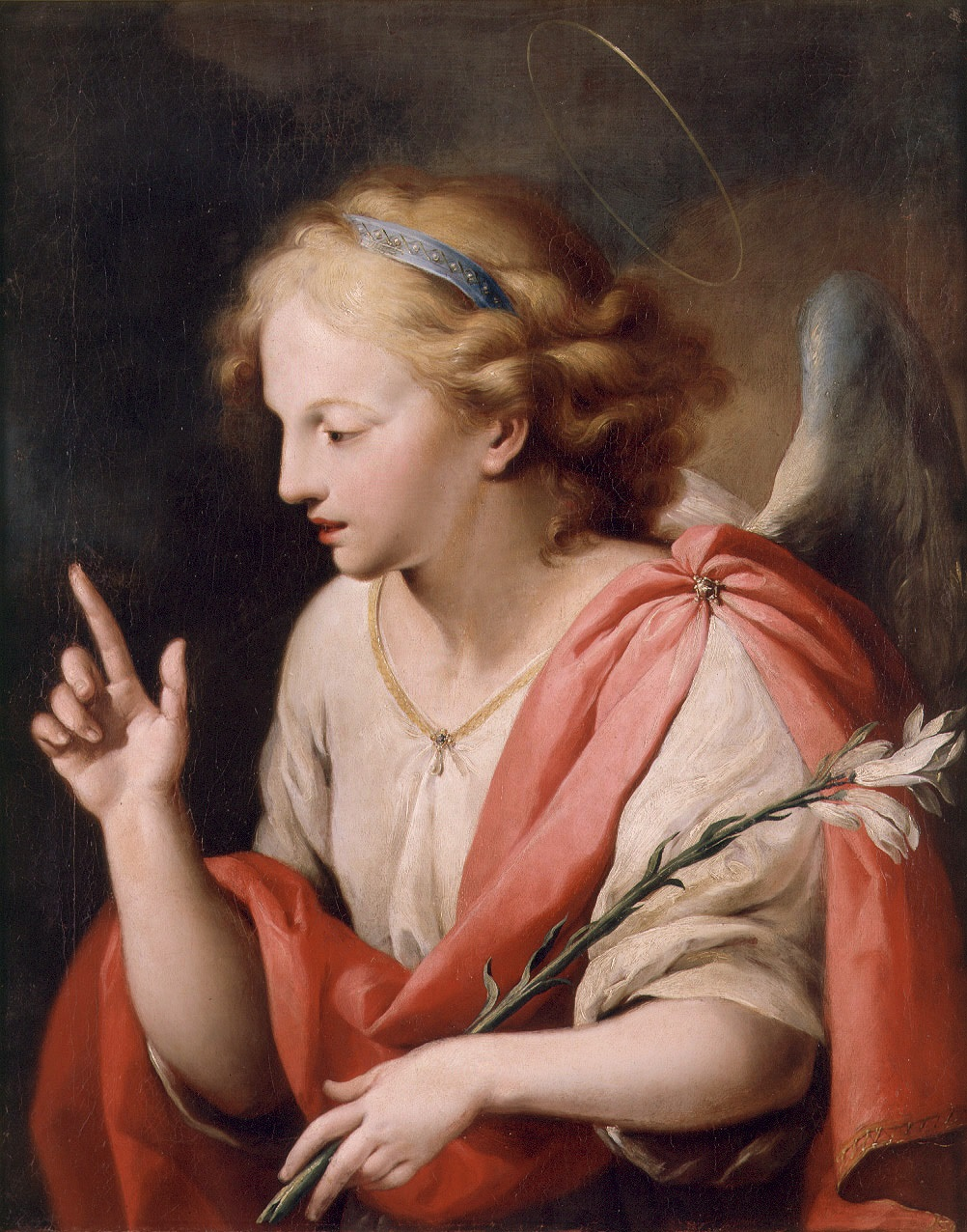
Arcángel San Gabriel. José Camarón Bonanat.

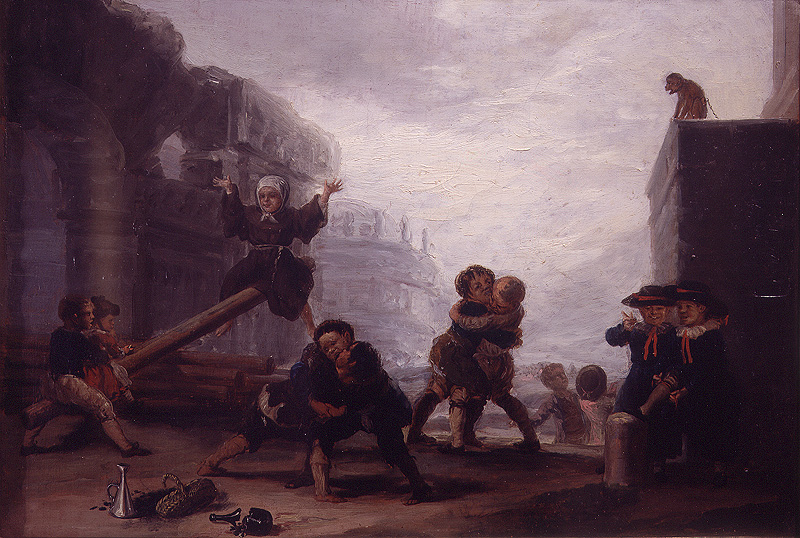
El balancín. Francisco Goya.

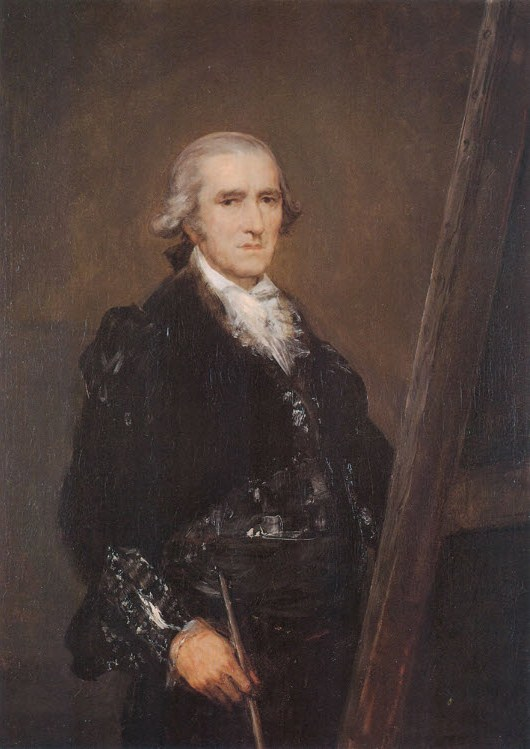
Portrait of Francisco Bayeu. Francisco Goya.

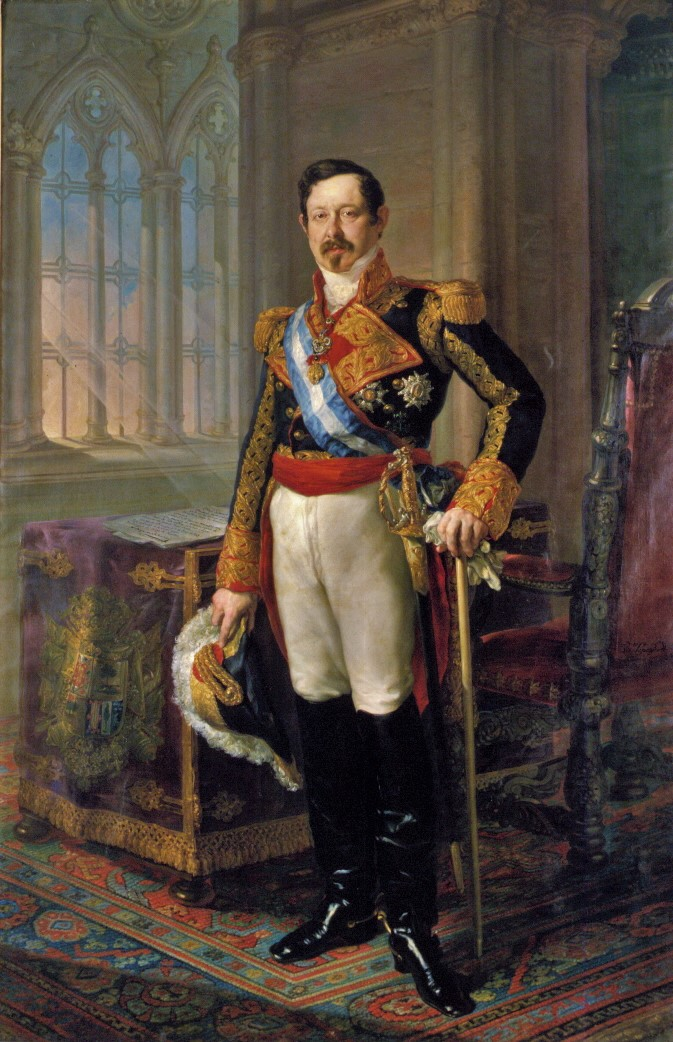
Ramón María Narváez, primer duque de Valencia, Vicente López Portaña.

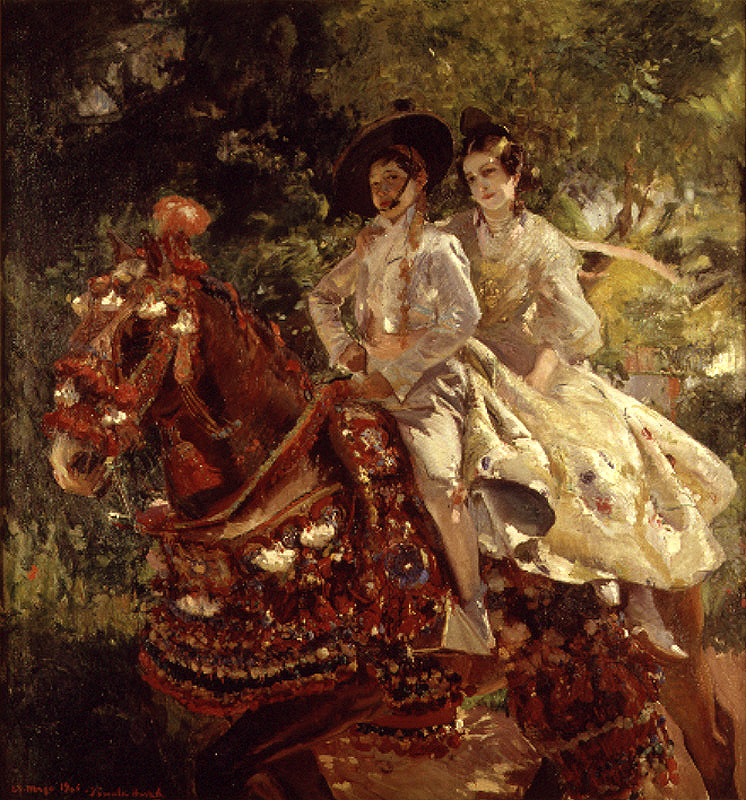
Grupa valenciana. Joaquín Sorolla.
