= Altarpiece of Saints Ursula, Martin and Anthony =

Polyptych by Gonzalo Pérez

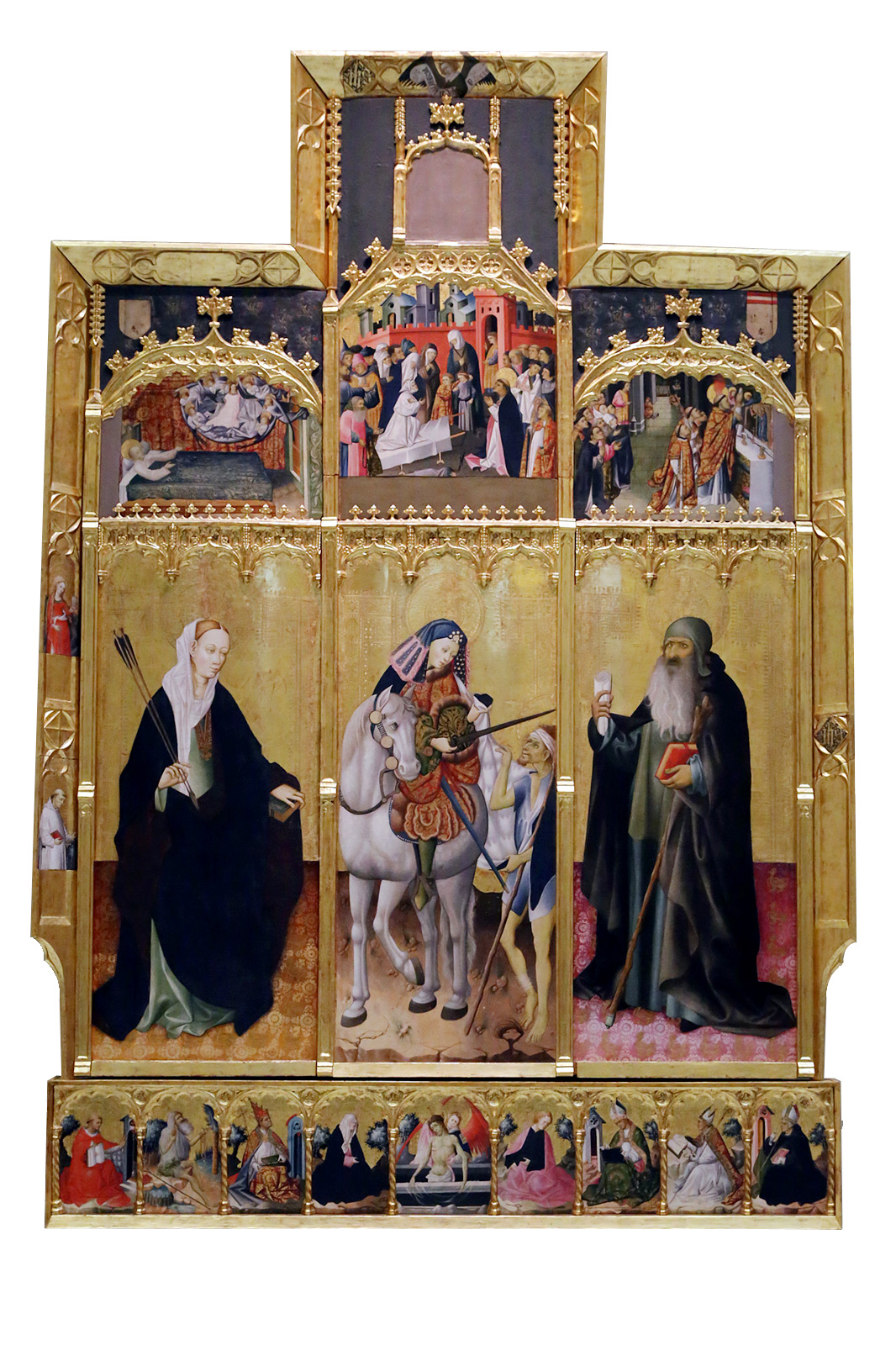
- Artist: Gonzalo Pérez
- Year: 1420
- Medium: Tempera on panel
- Dimensions: 385 cm × 261 cm (152 in × 103 in)
- Location: Museu de Belles Arts de València, Valencia

The Altarpiece of Saints Ursula, Martin and Anthony is a reredo by the Spanish late Gothic painter Gonzalo Pérez, dating to 1420 and housed in the Museu de Belles Arts of Valencia, Spain.

Painted in the International Gothic style (with influences, such as in St. Martin's rich garments, by the Italian Gentile da Fabriano), it is one of the artist's few known works, painted for the Portaceli Monastery.

== Altarpiece details ==
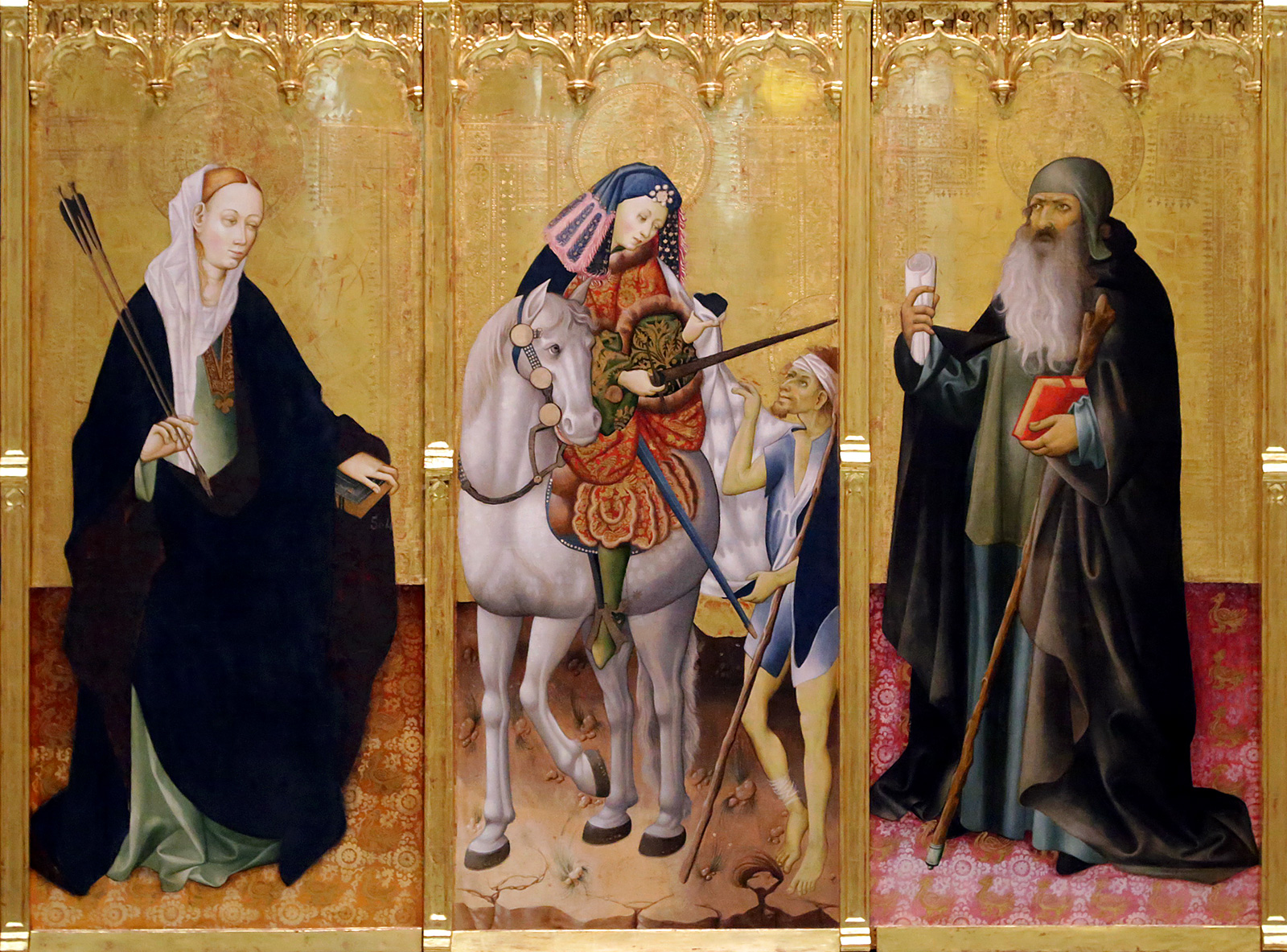
Detail

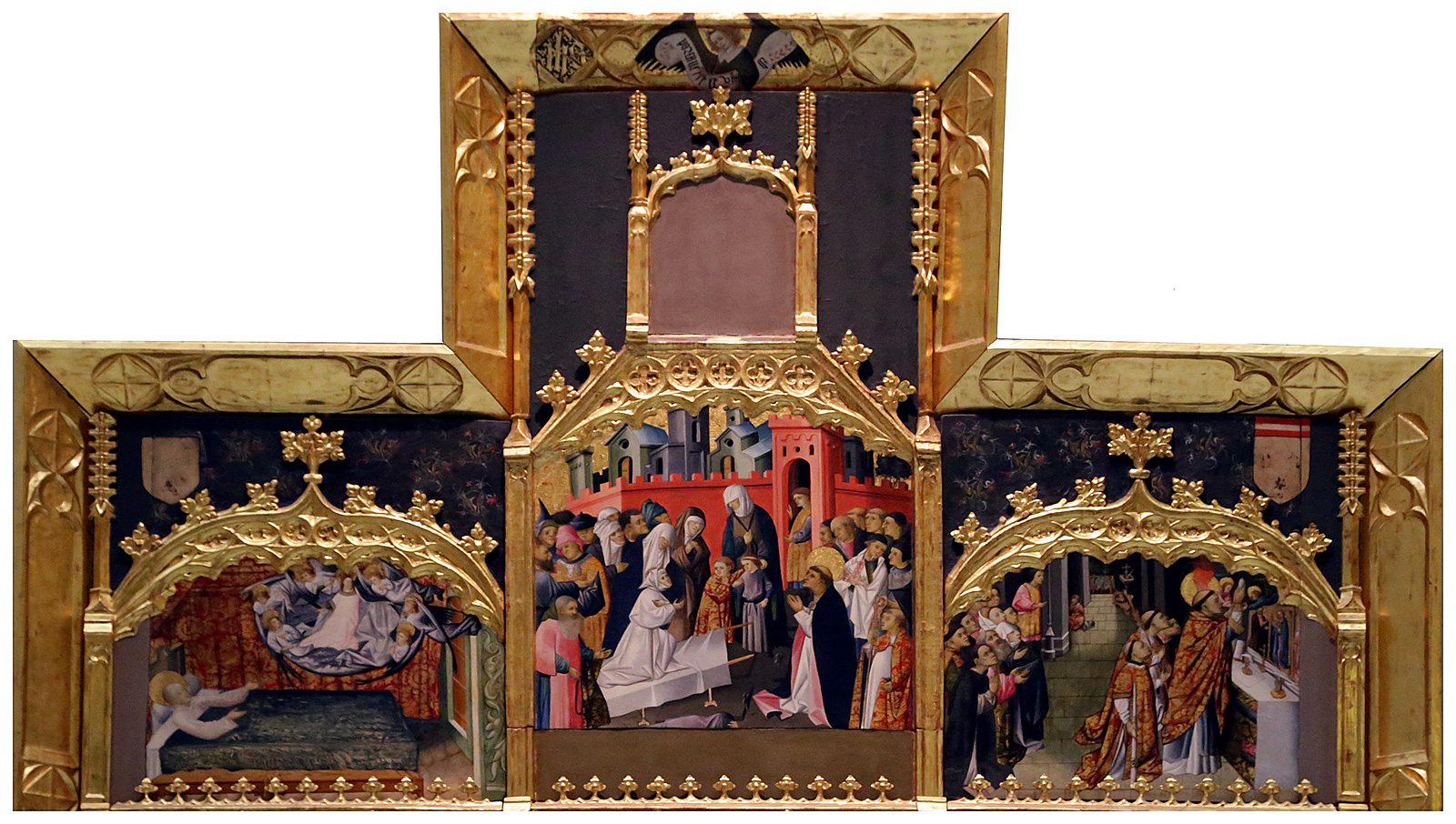
Detail

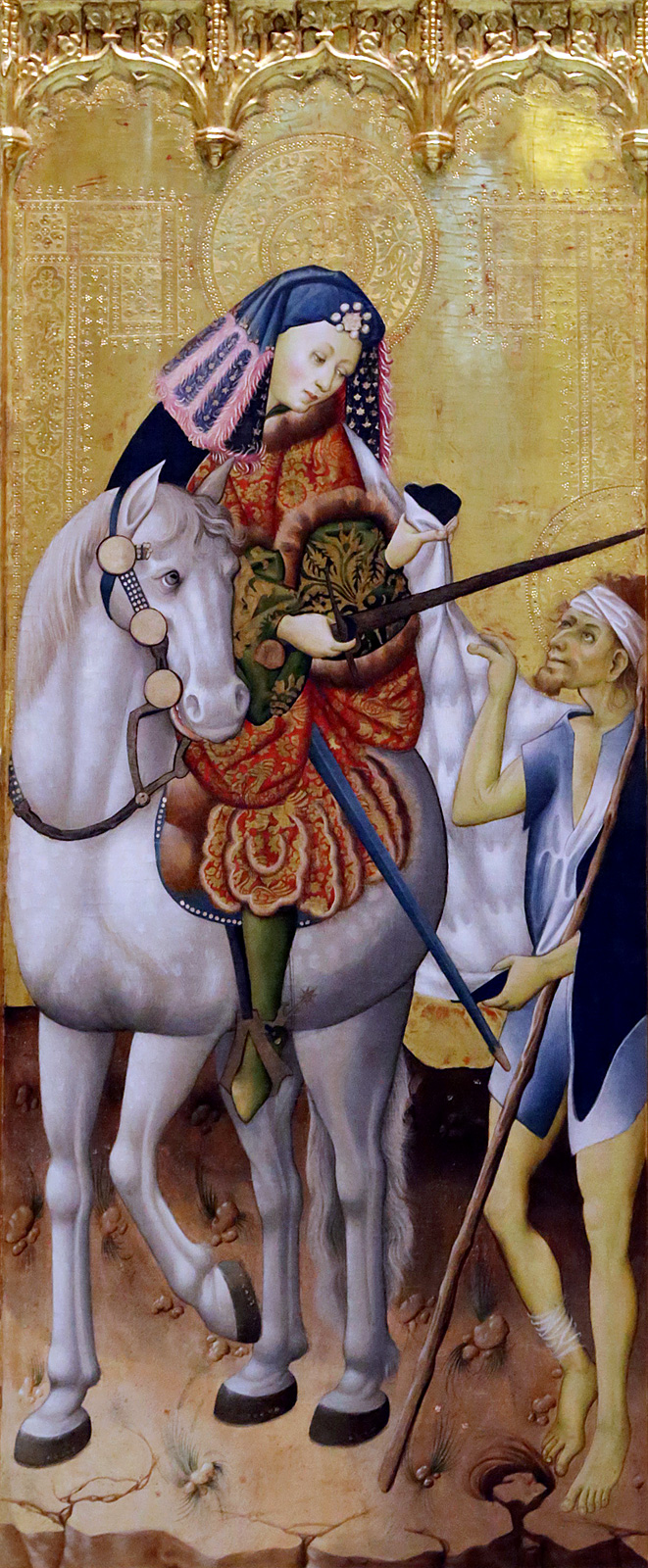
Detail

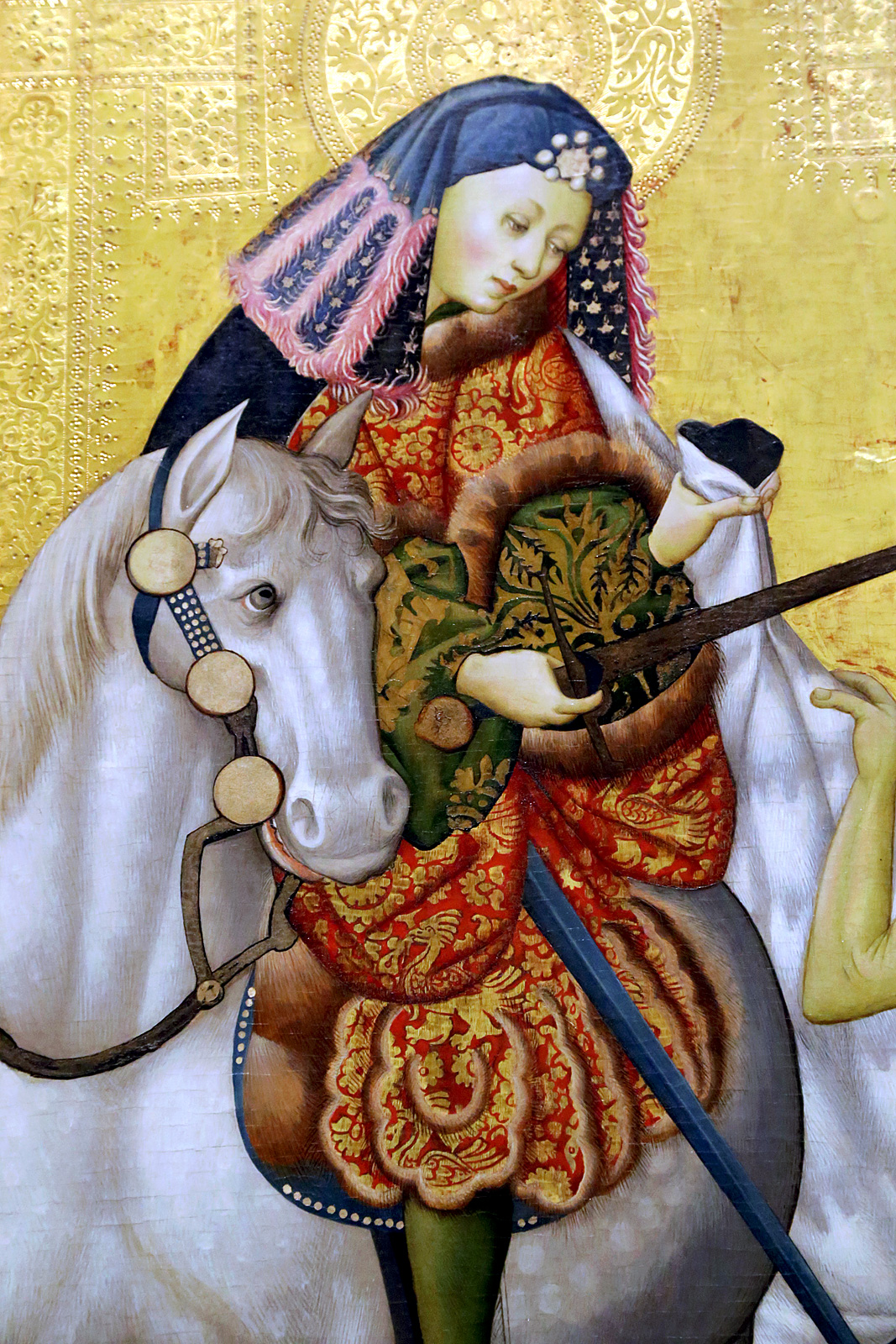
Detail

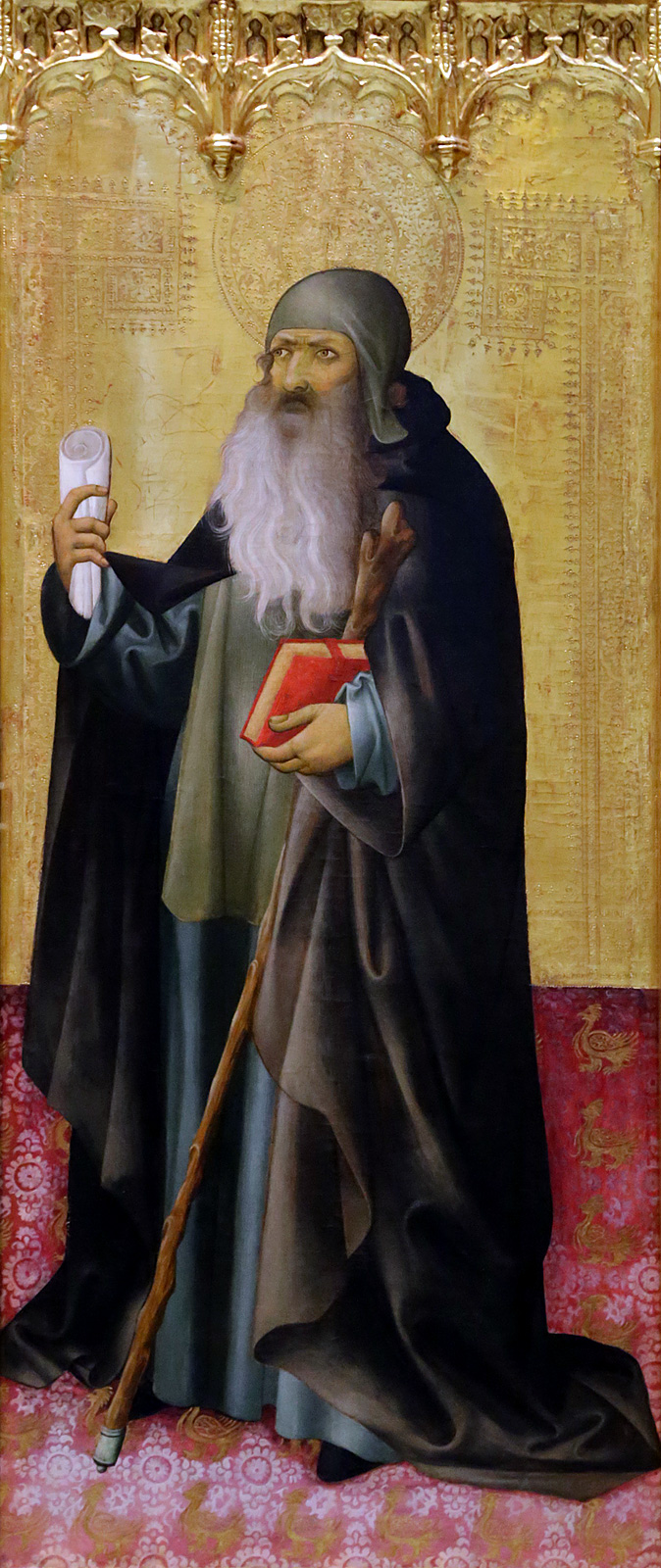
Detail

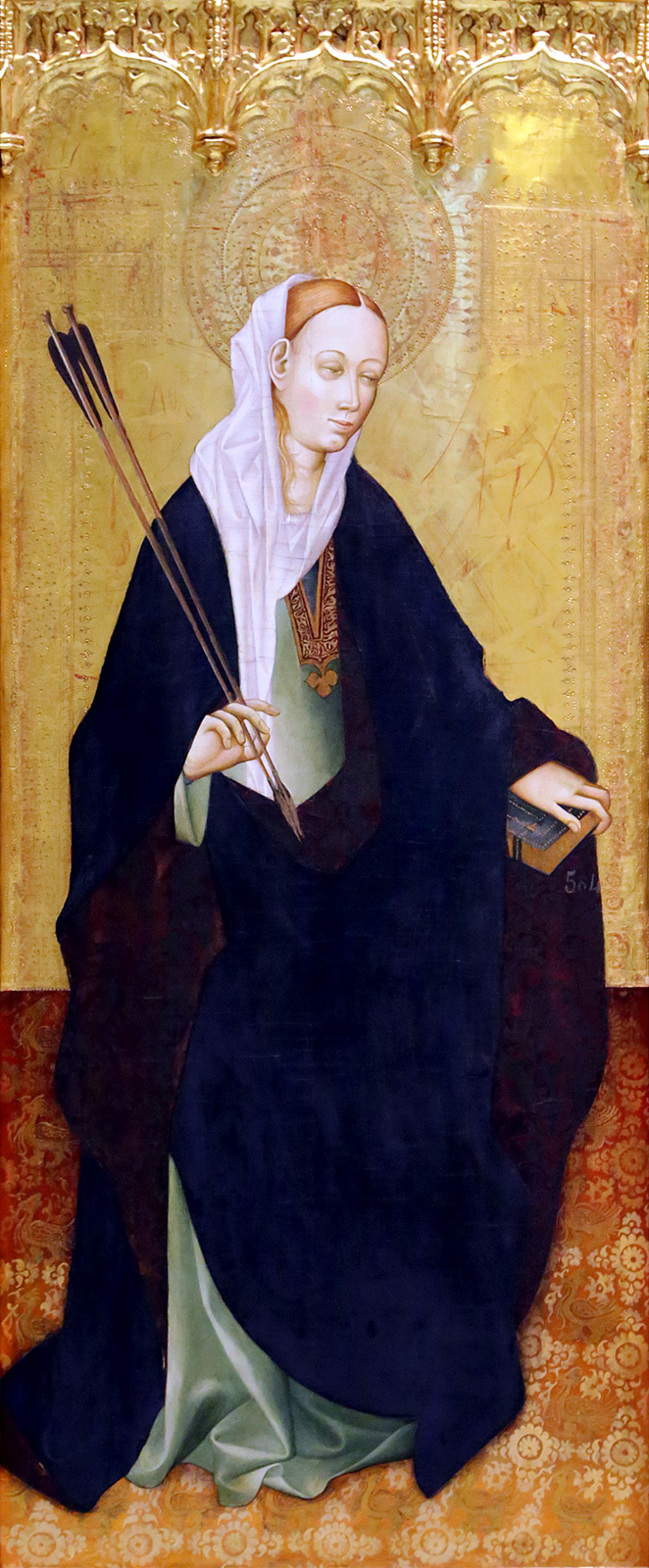
Detail

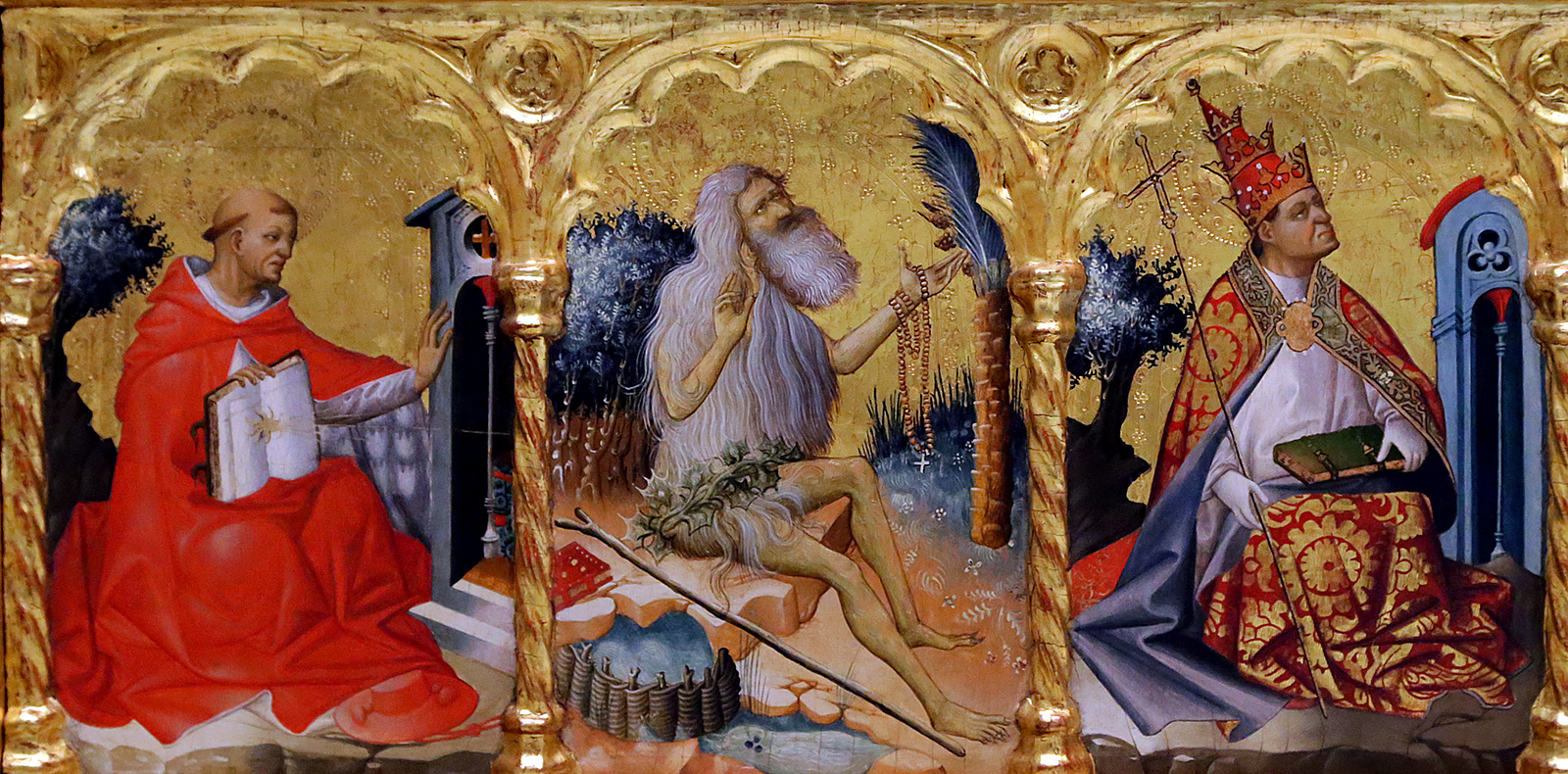
Detail

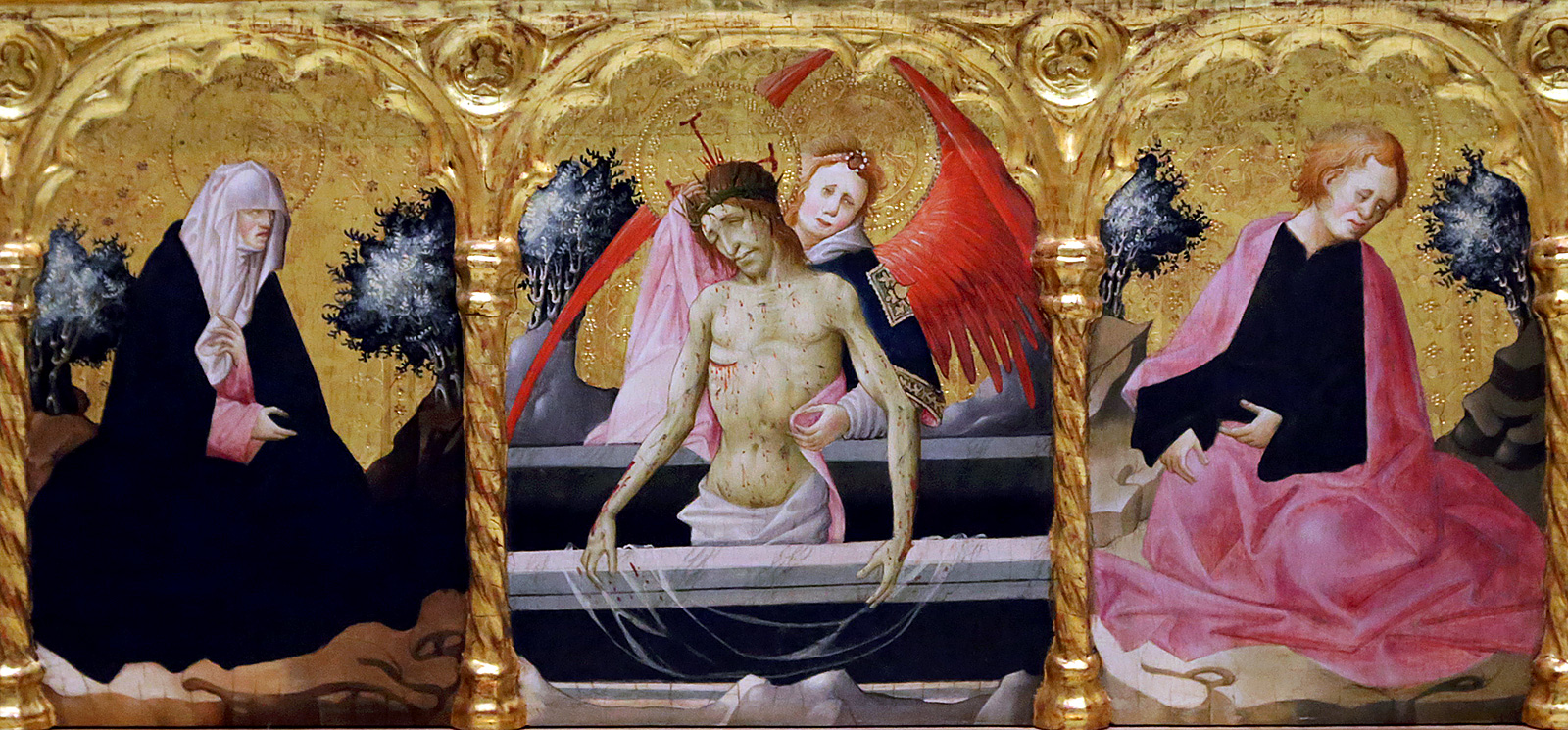
Detail

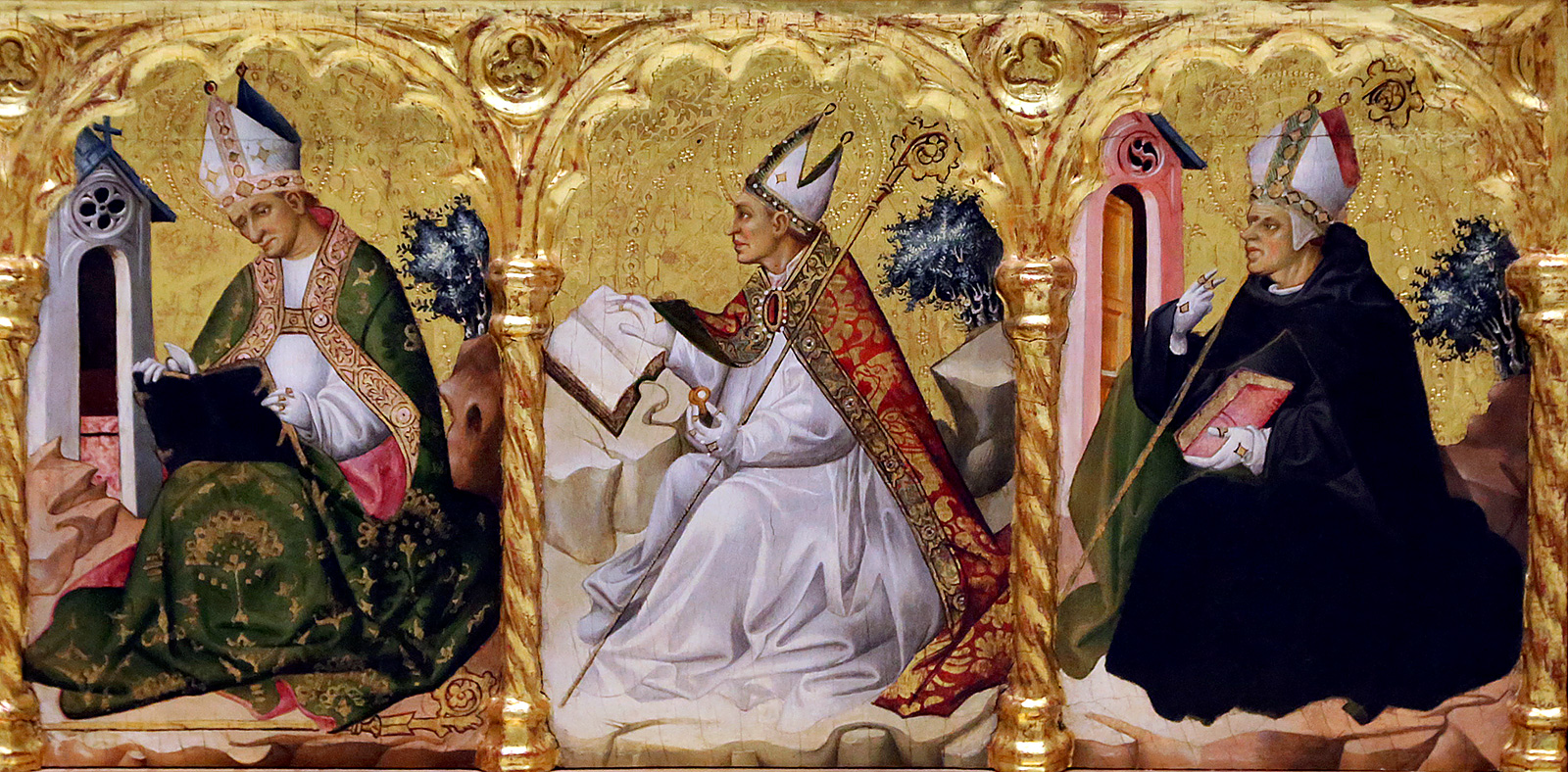
Detail

== Sources ==
- De Vecchi, Pierluigi; Elda Cerchiari (1999). I tempi dell'arte. Milan: Bompiani. ISBN 88-451-7212-0.
