= Puertomingalvo =

- municipality
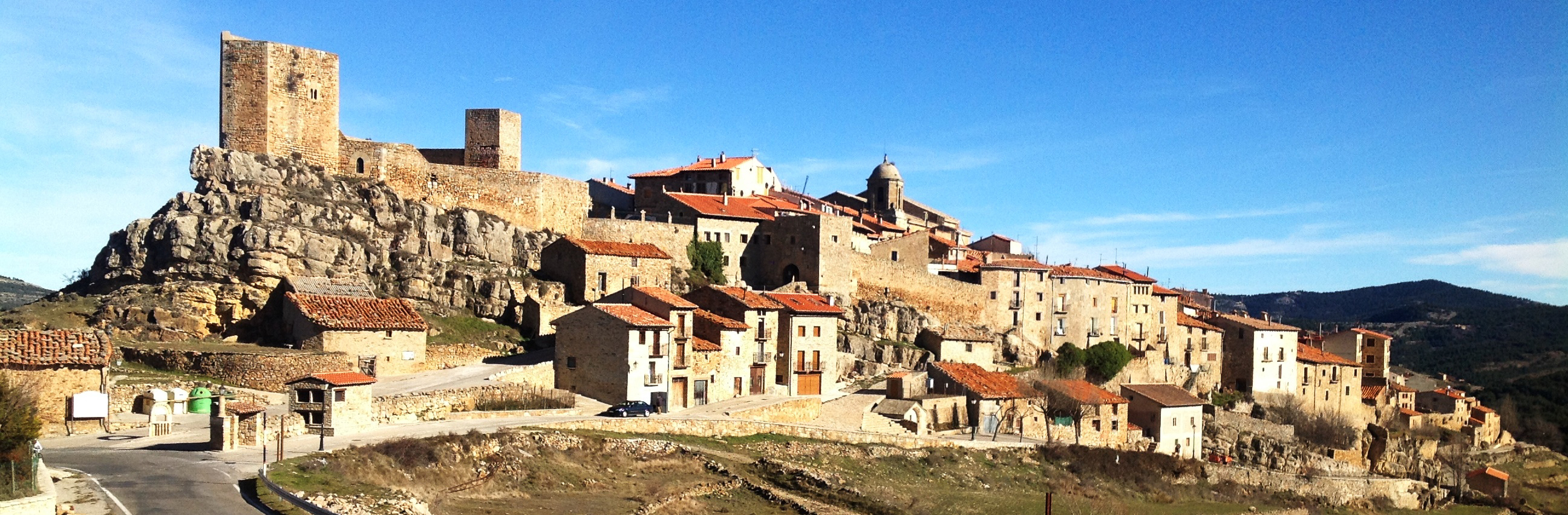

- Coat of arms

- Location within Spain
- Coordinates: 40°16′N 0°27′W
- Country: Spain
- Autonomous community: Aragon
- Province: Teruel
- Municipality: Puertomingalvo

Area
  - Total: 103.62 km^{2} (40.01 sq mi)
- Elevation: 1,449 m (4,754 ft)

Population (2025-01-01)
  - Total: 135
  - Density: 1.30/km^{2} (3.37/sq mi)
- Time zone: UTC+1 (CET)
  - Summer (DST): UTC+2 (CEST)

Puertomingalvo is a municipality located at high elevation in the province of Teruel, Aragon, Spain. According to the 2004 census (INE), the municipality has a population of 182 inhabitants.

This town is located close to the Sierra de Mayabona, part of the Iberian System.

== See also ==
- List of municipalities in Teruel
