= Monastery of San Pedro de Arlanza =

Coordinates: 42°04′10″N 3°25′29″W

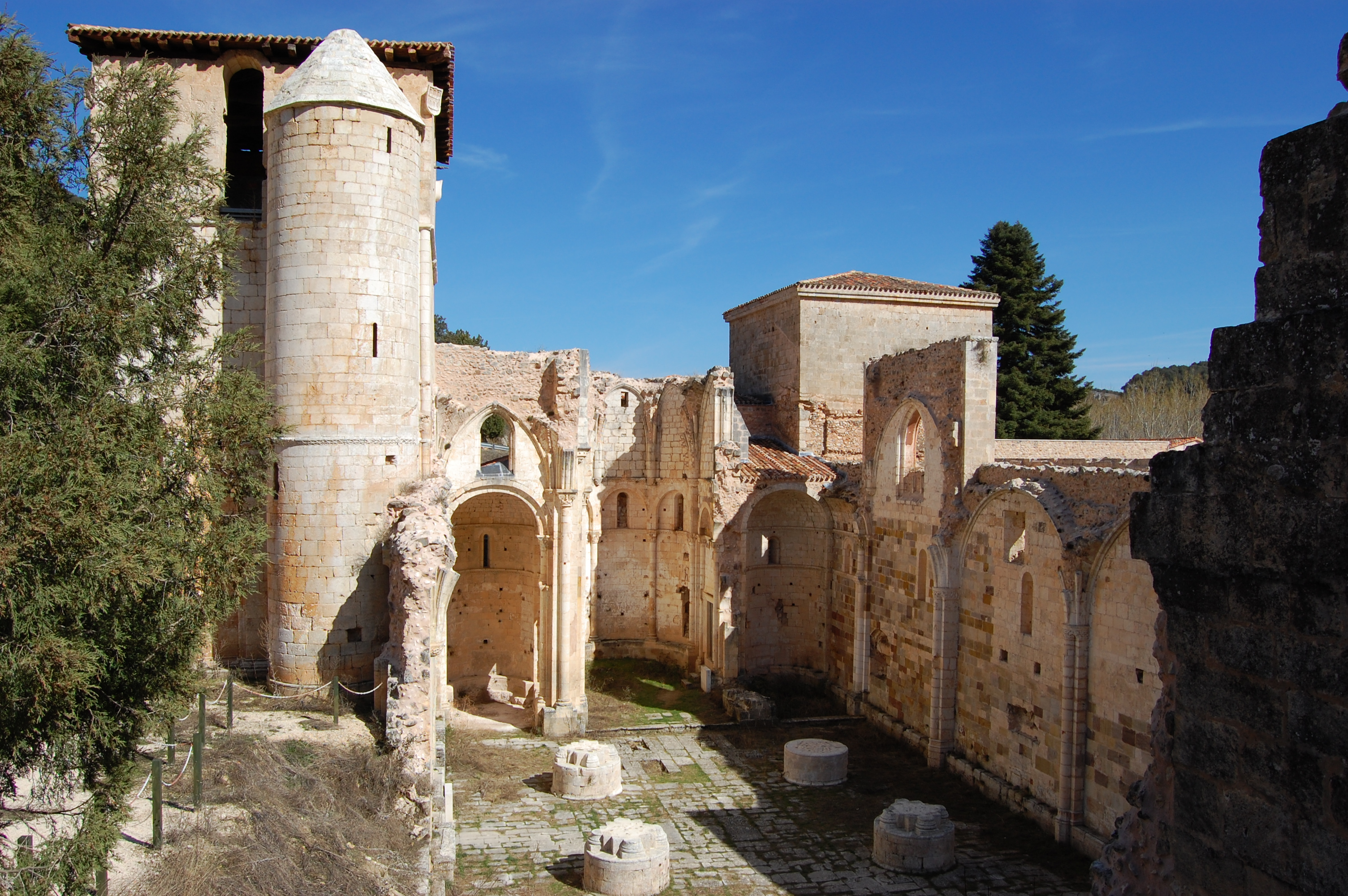
Ruins of San Pedro de Arlanza today

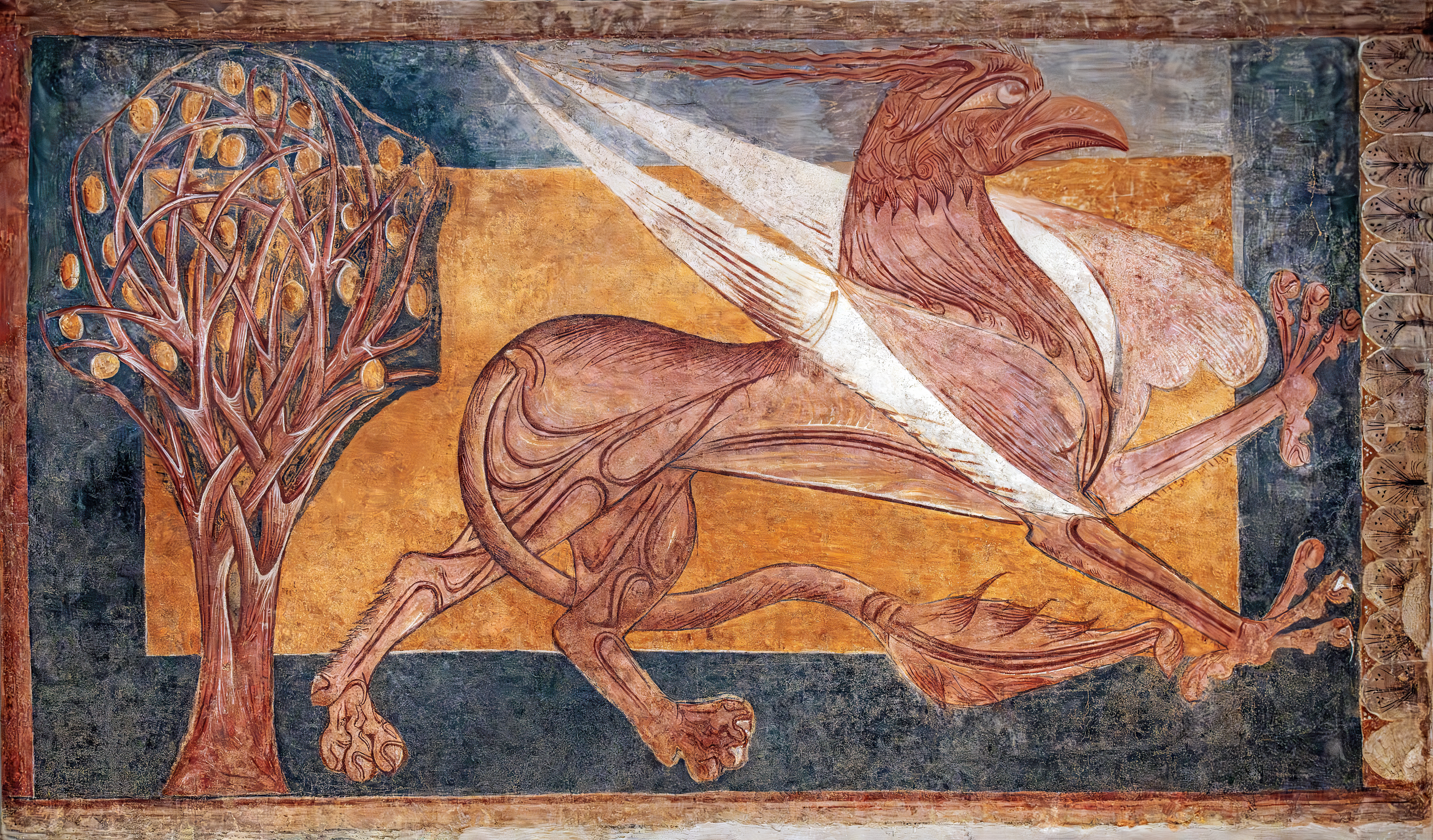
Paintings from Arlanza (MNAC Barcelona)

San Pedro de Arlanza is a ruined Benedictine monastery in north central Spain. It is located in the valley of the river Arlanza in Hortigüela, Burgos. Founded in 912, it has been called the "cradle of Castile" (cuna de Castilla). It was abandoned in 1841 during the confiscations of Juan Álvarez Mendizábal's government, when ecclesiastical properties were roundly redistributed.

San Pedro's two purported founding documents, preserved in twelfth-century cartulary, were issued one by Count Fernán González and his wife, Sancha of Navarre, and the other by Fernán's mother and brother, Muniadona Ramírez and Ramiro González, with Count Gonzalo Téllez and his wife, Flamula. Both documents suffer from certain inconsistencies and anachronisms that have cast doubts on their authenticity, especially that of Fernán González. It was probably forged to give the monastery a more illustrious lineage than it could prove to have. The copy of the charter of Gonzalo Téllez is more likely to be based on reality, since Gonzalo is known to have been active in 912. Fernán González and Sancha were buried at San Pedro, however, and remained there until the dispersal of the monastic community in 1841 necessitated the removal of their sarcophagi to the collegiate church of San Cosme y San Damián at Covarrubias.

The present ruins of the church are those of the building begun in 1080. It had three naves and three semicircular apses in the Romanesque style. Later modifications in the Gothic style transformed the outward appearance, but some of its eleventh-century capitals have been preserved. Among the ruins the three apses still stand, as do the tower (erected towards the close of the twelfth century), part of the cloisters and the chapter house, and the double-aperture and the tympanum above the main façade. The portal of the church was transferred to the National Archaeological Museum of Spain in Madrid in 1895. A large Romanesque tomb, said to belong to the legendary Mudarra González, was moved to the Cathedral of Burgos, and some frescoes have been transferred to the Metropolitan Museum of Art in New York and others (like Paintings from Arlanza) to the Museu Nacional d'Art de Catalunya in Barcelona.

== See also ==
- Early medieval domes
- Stanza di Ruggiero and Palatine Chapel of Palazzo dei Normanni Palermo, Sicily, Italy the monument mosaics that can claim the closest resemblance to the Arlanza paintings.
