= Paintings from Arlanza =

13th-century Spanish paintings

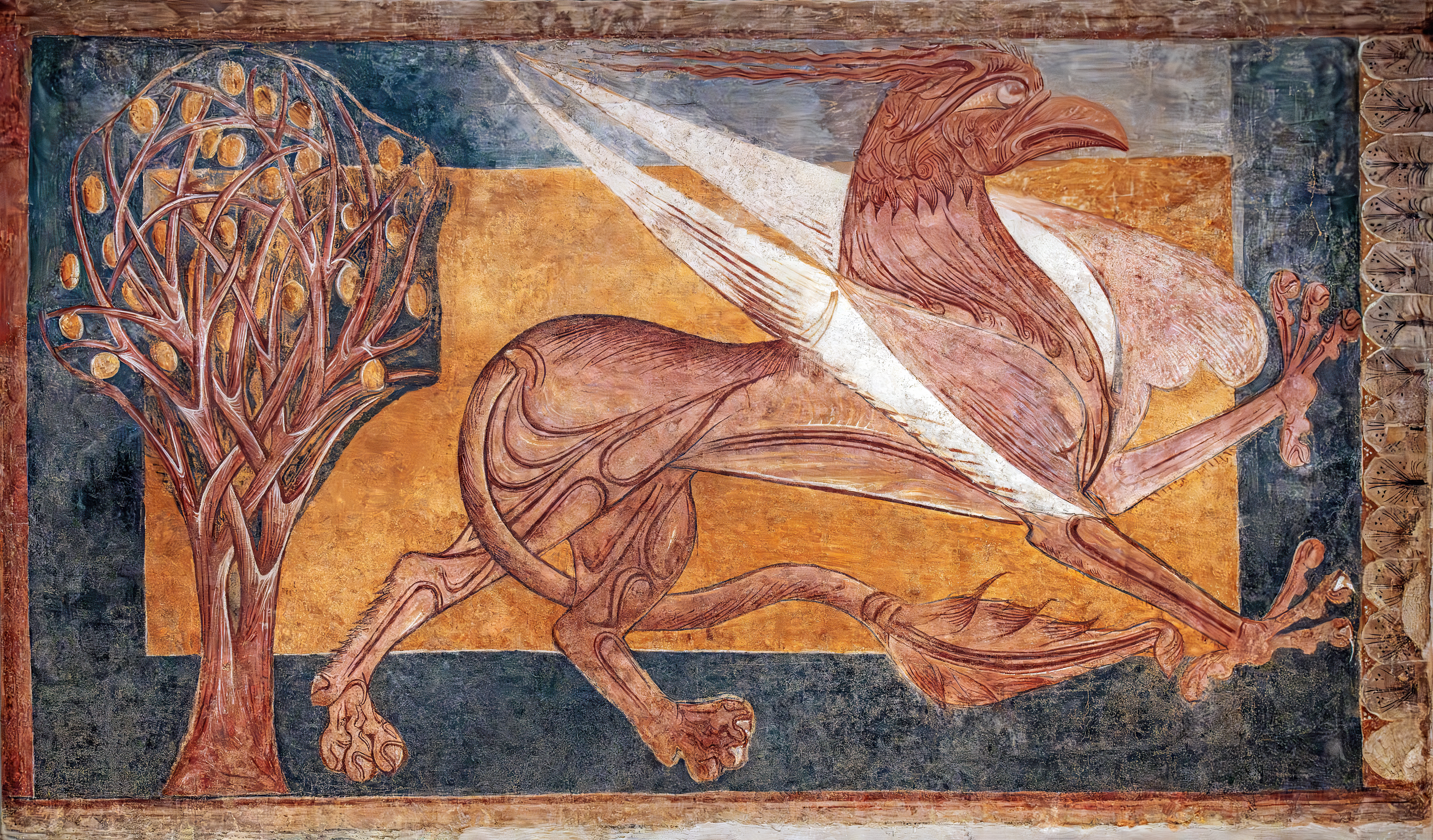
The Arlanza gryphon, fresco transferred to canvas, 189.5 × 322 cm, c. 1210, MNAC, Barcelona

The paintings from Arlanza are a set of frescos belonging to the mural decoration of a Benedictine monastery of San Pedro de Arlanza, in the Province of Burgos, Castile and León, Spain, dating to around 1210, and now dispersed among a number of collections. The Spanish government began to detach and sell sections of the frescos in the 19th century, though less exciting sections remain in situ. In 1943, the largest group of six major fragments was moved to the National Art Museum of Catalonia of Barcelona. Most of the Romanesque mural painting that has survived is of religious subjects. There was also fine decorations of a courtly or profane nature in large monastic centres, such as Arlanza in Castile, and these fragments represent especially rare survivals. According to C. R. Dodwell, the "imposing" Arlanza paintings are "endowed with all the power and grandeur of Romanesque at its best".

== Description ==
The ten very large animals and other subjects from the world of heraldry come from the chapter house or a room above, on the lowest floor of the so-called Torre del Tesoro (Treasury Tower), and are inspired by illuminated bestiaries, with the basic landscape backgrounds that are often seen in these. The Barcelona group includes a gryphon, a legendary creature with the body of a lion and the head and wings of an eagle, in a watchful pose. The MNAC has 5 more fragments from the same decorative group. There are other panels of a lion and a dragon, now at The Cloisters in New York, one at the Harvard University Fogg Art Museum, and another in a private collection.

The style of the paintings in Arlanza is generally related to other Spanish works of around 1200, especially the frescos from the Monastery of Santa María de Sigena (also in MNAC, Barcelona), which are clearly influenced by English illuminated manuscript miniature painting, something that can be seen in the refinement and the precision of the motifs, combined with their monumental nature. The Sigena frescos, which are probably actually largely by English artists, namely some of the team who illuminated the Winchester Bible, also contain a very similar gryphon and lion, and are possibly by the same principal artist. The Arlanza fragments in New York still include their section of the black and white frieze with more figures including fabulous beasts running below the large polychrome animals.

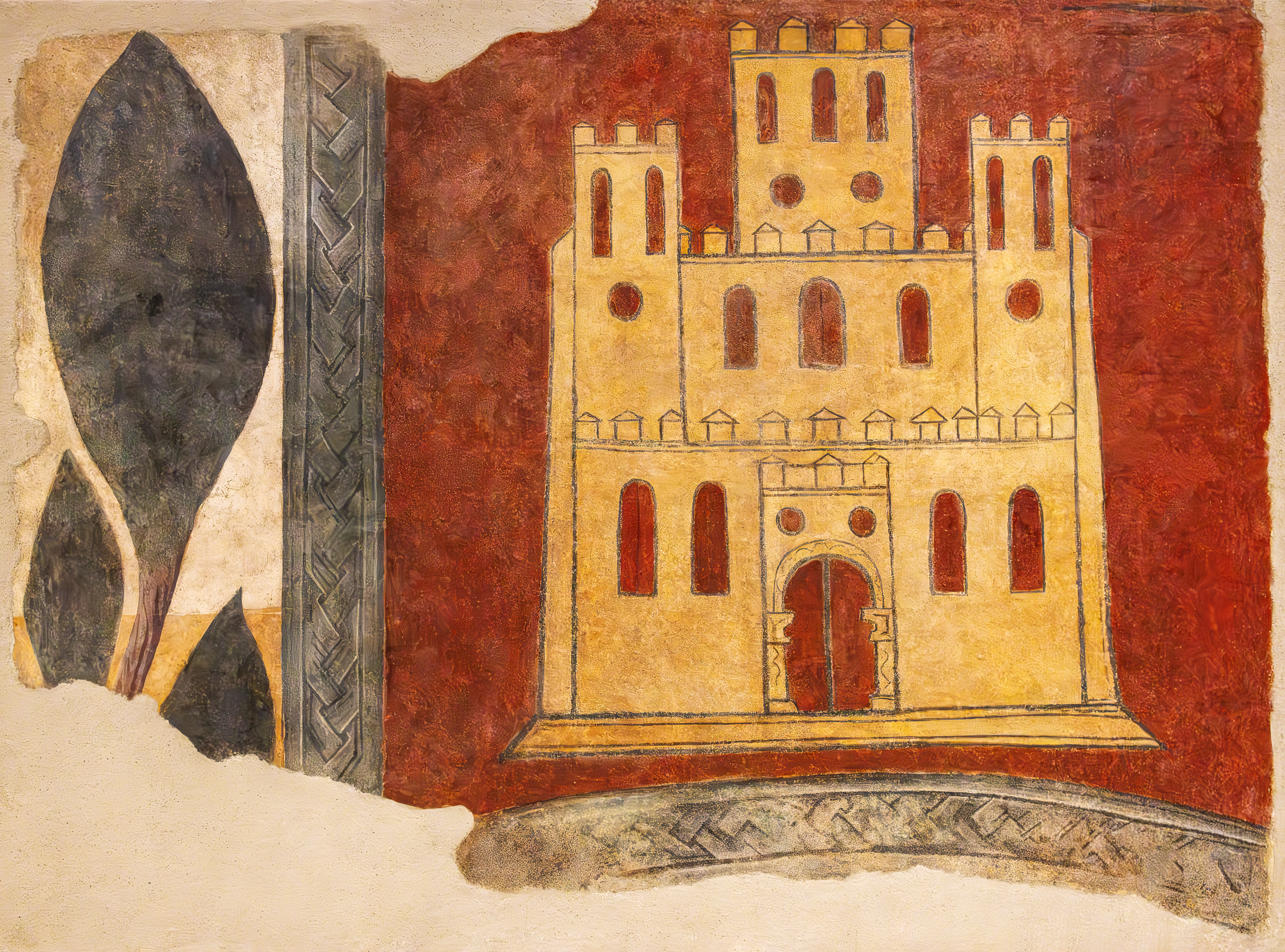
Emblem of Castile, MNAC

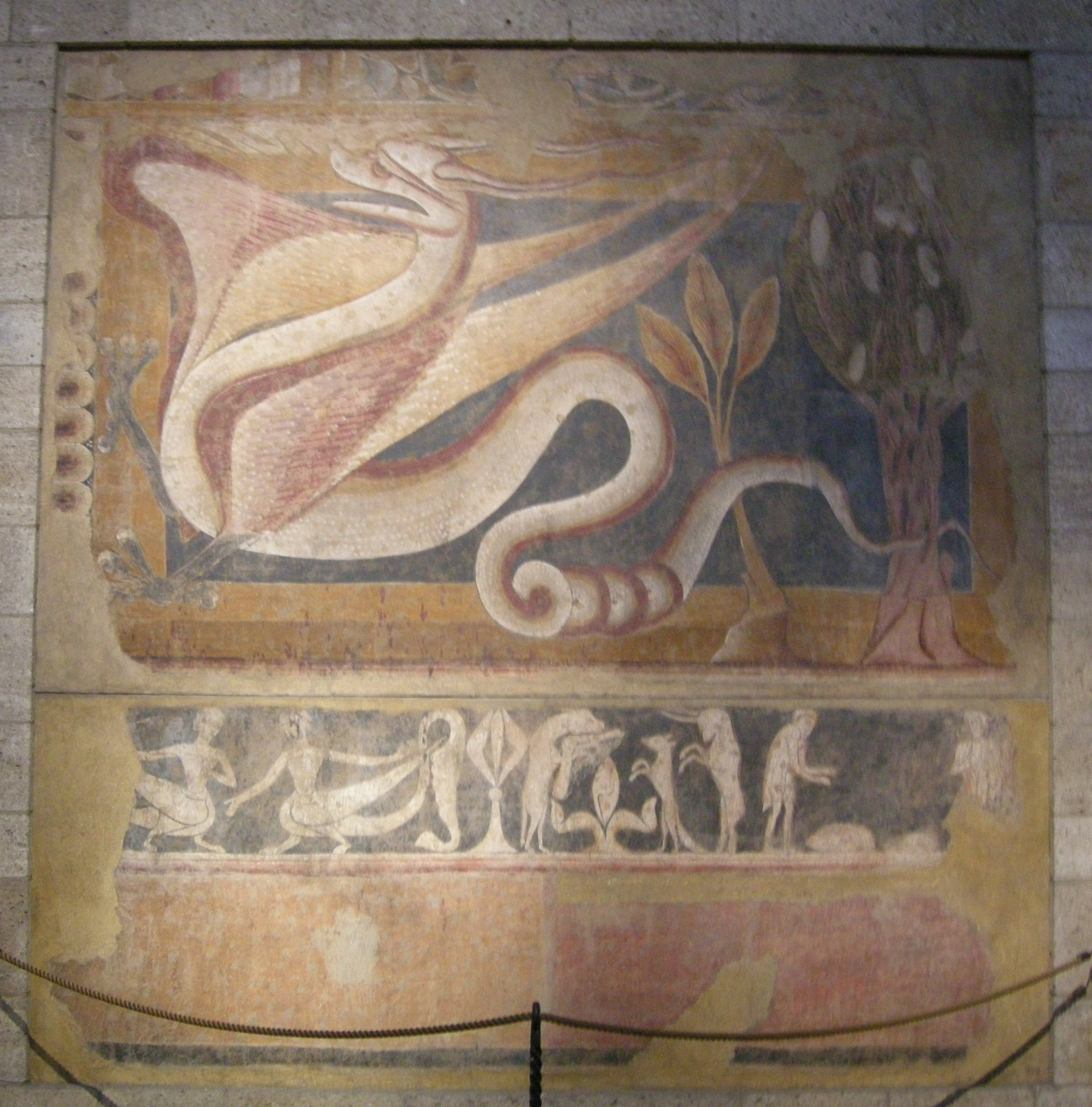
Dragon in New York

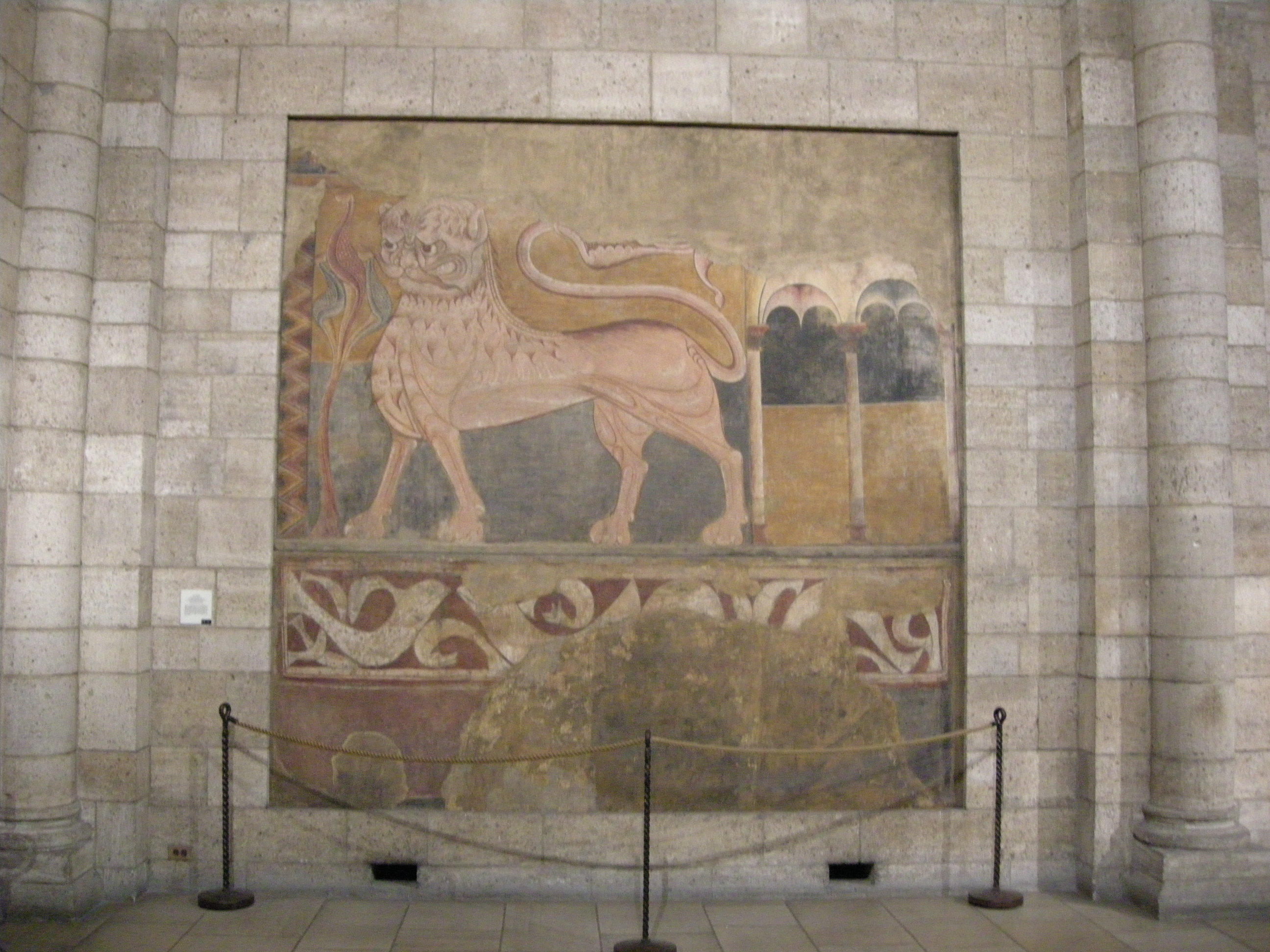
Old emblem of León in New York

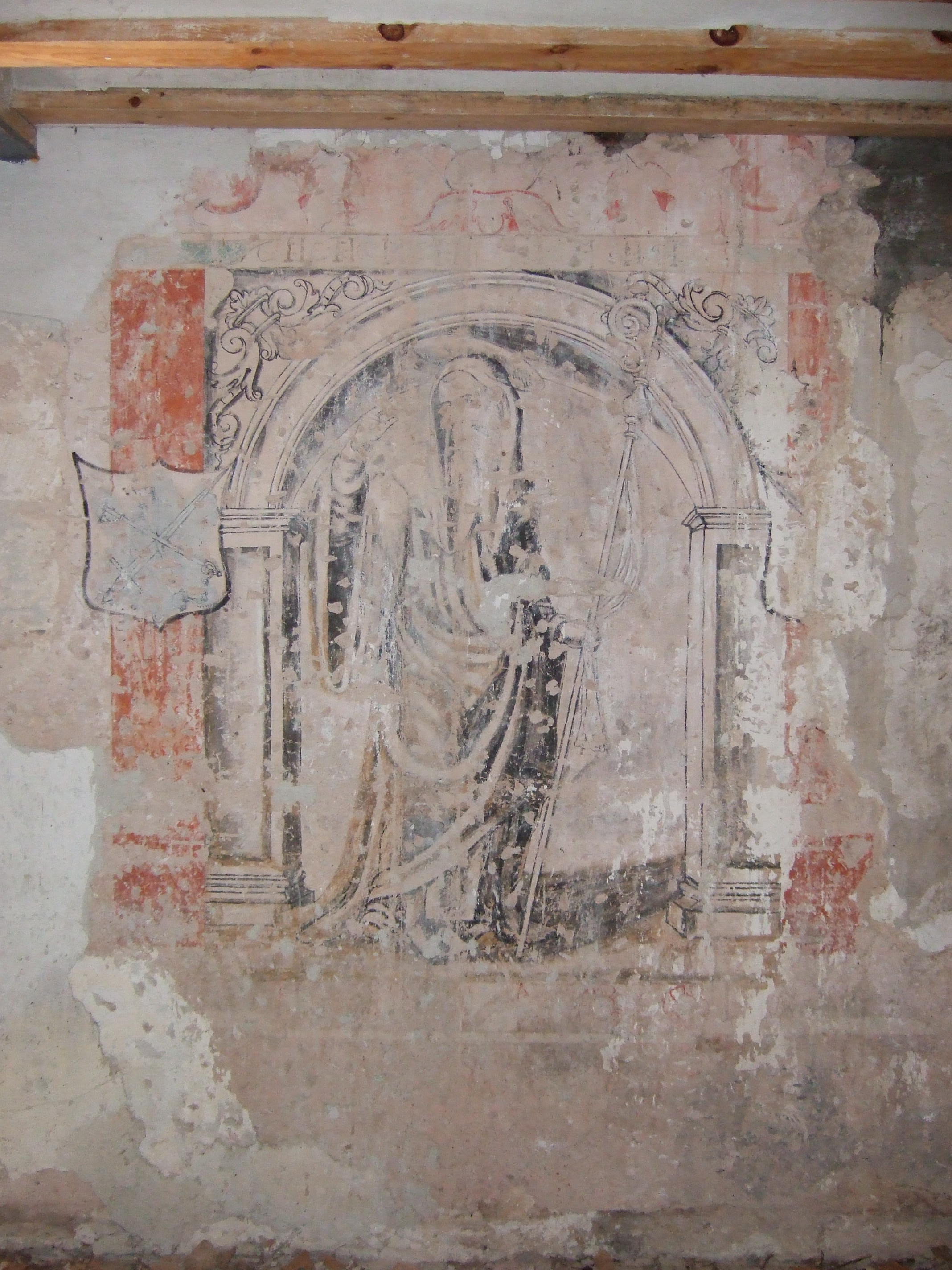
A figure with crozier, still at Arlanza; later period

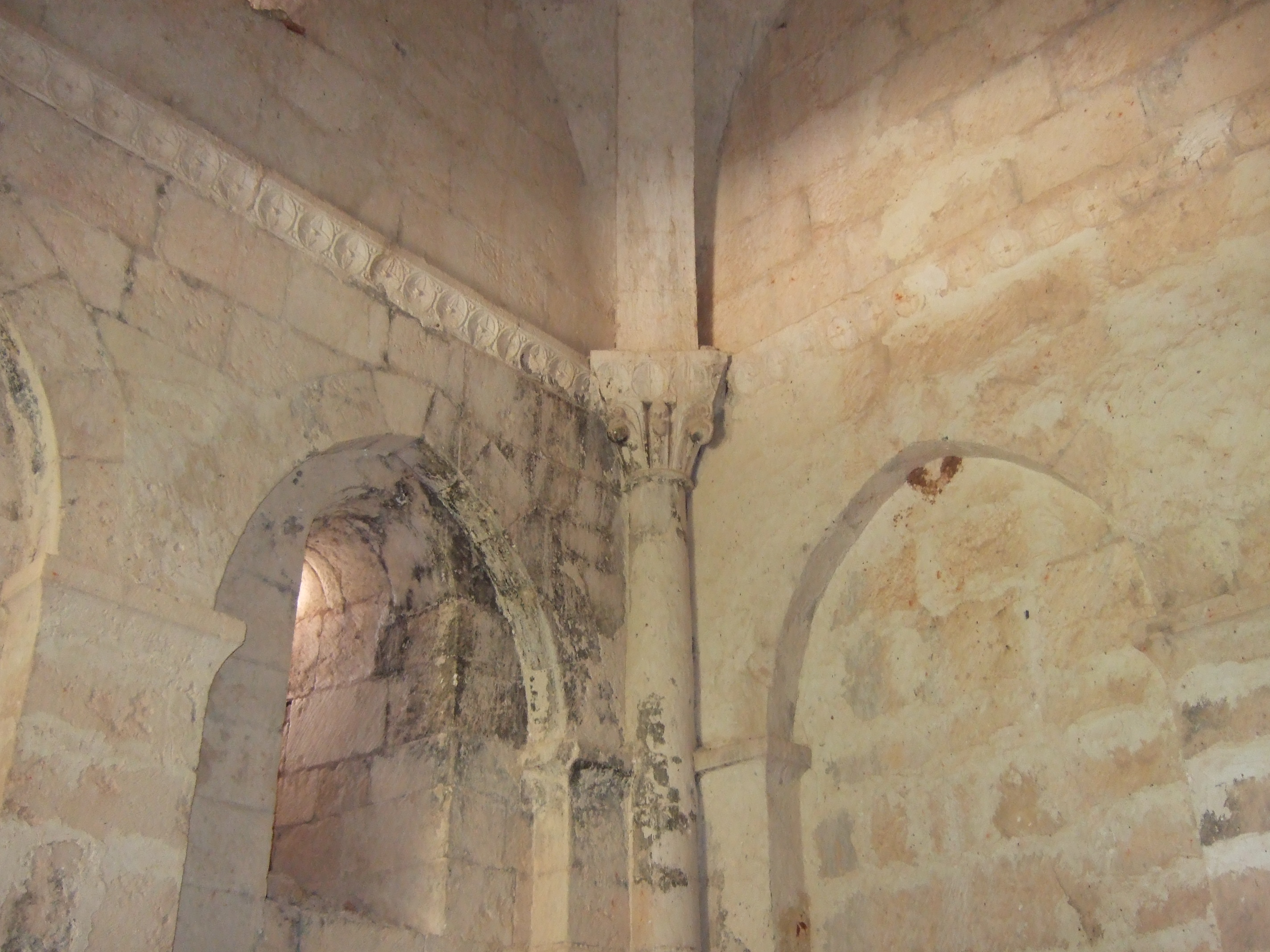
The room in the tower from which(?) the paintings were removed

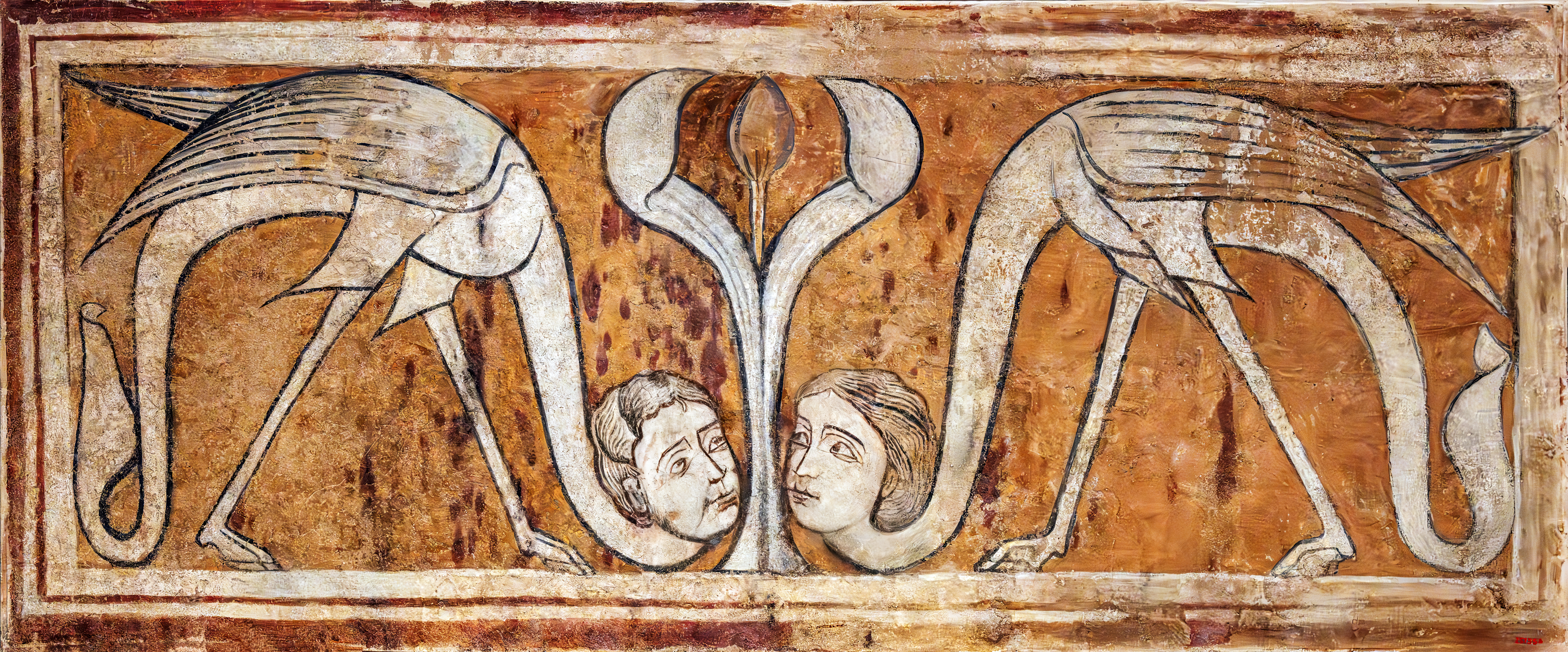
Bird-mermaids, MNAC
