= Chapter house =

Meeting building or room in a religious structure

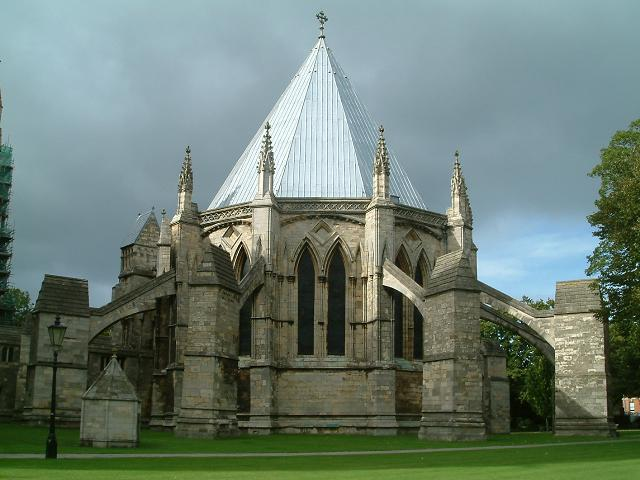
The Chapterhouse at Lincoln Cathedral with flying buttresses surrounding the building

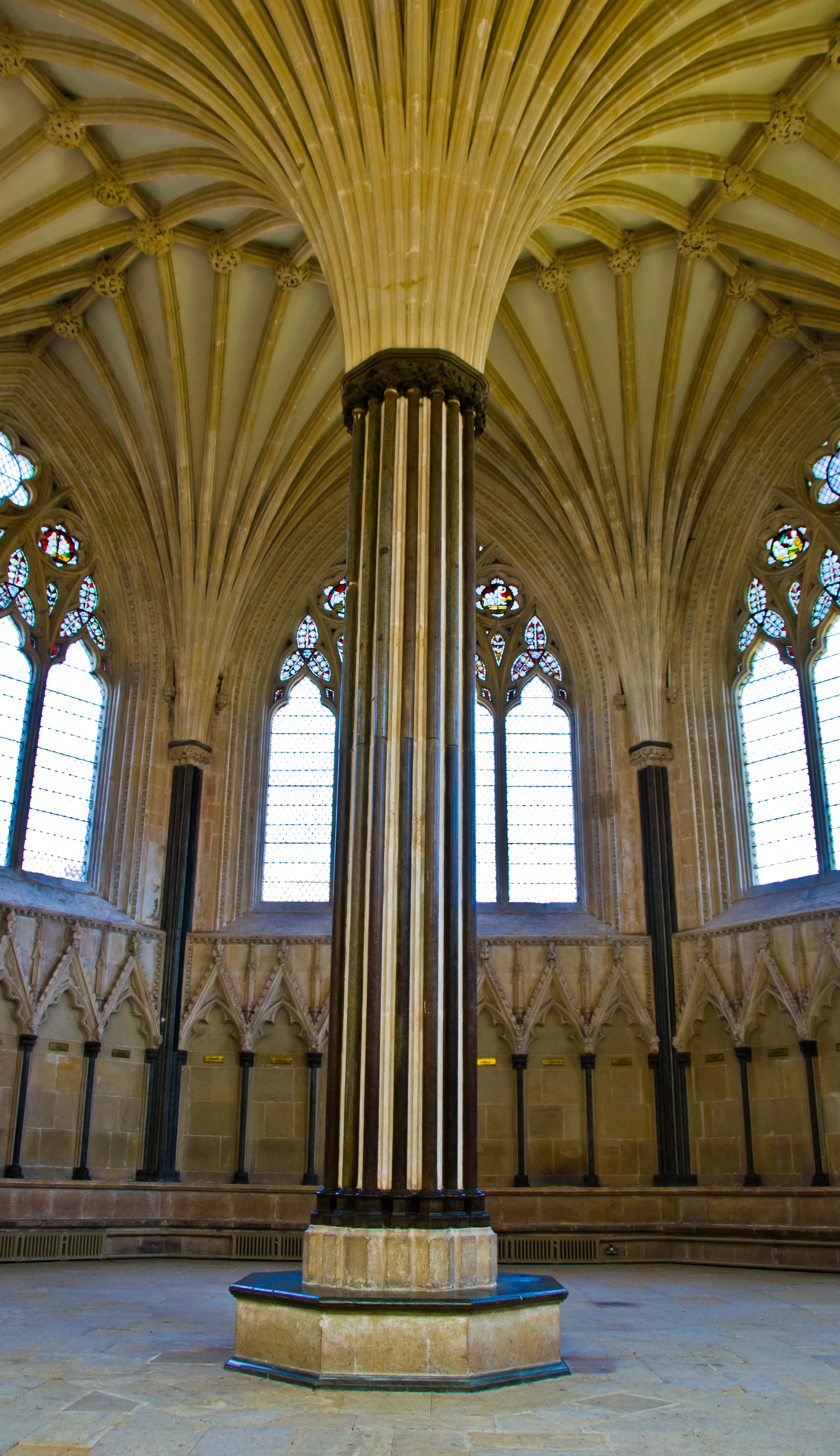
The chapter house of Wells Cathedral, built c. 1300

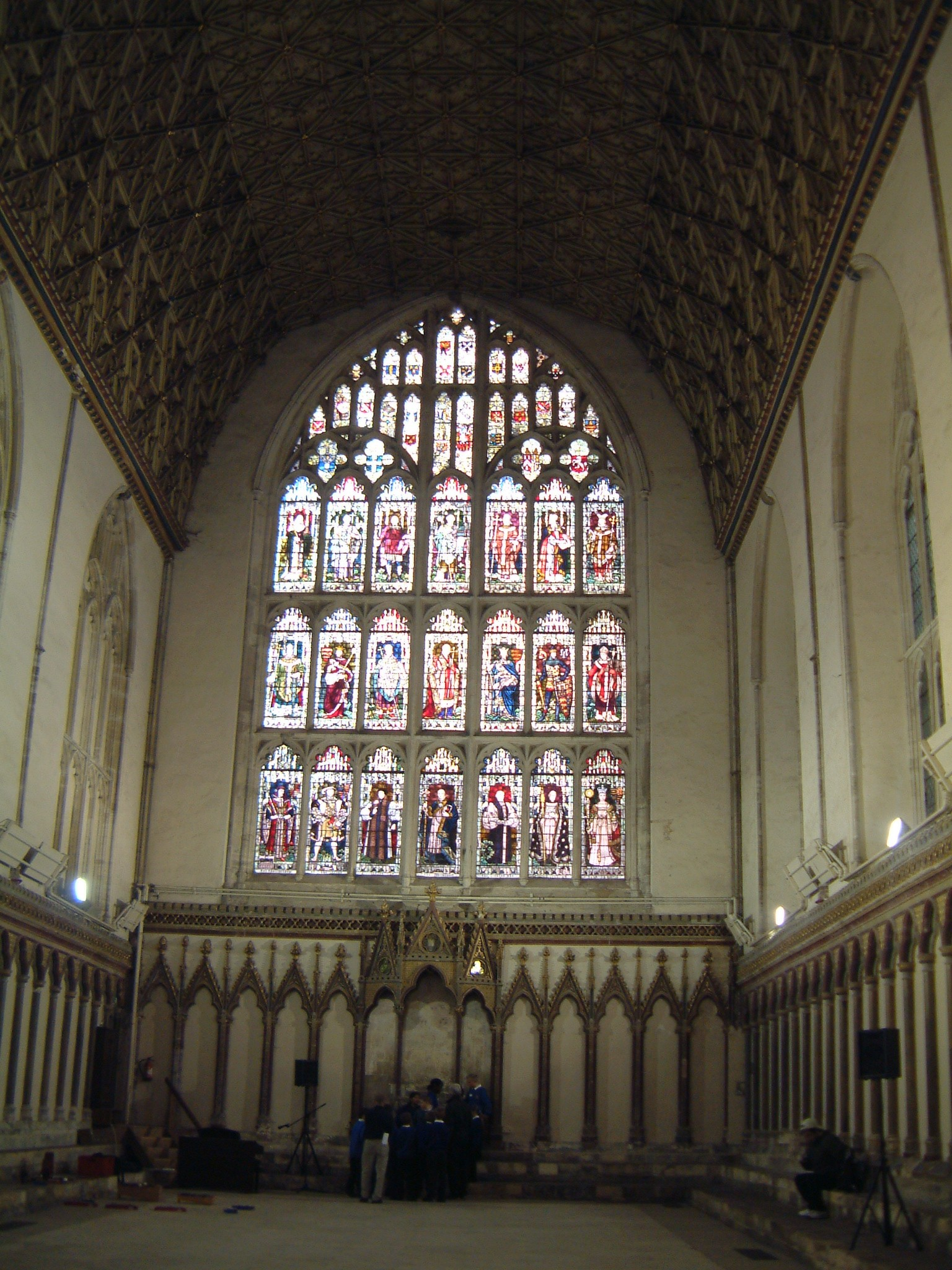
The chapter house of Canterbury Cathedral

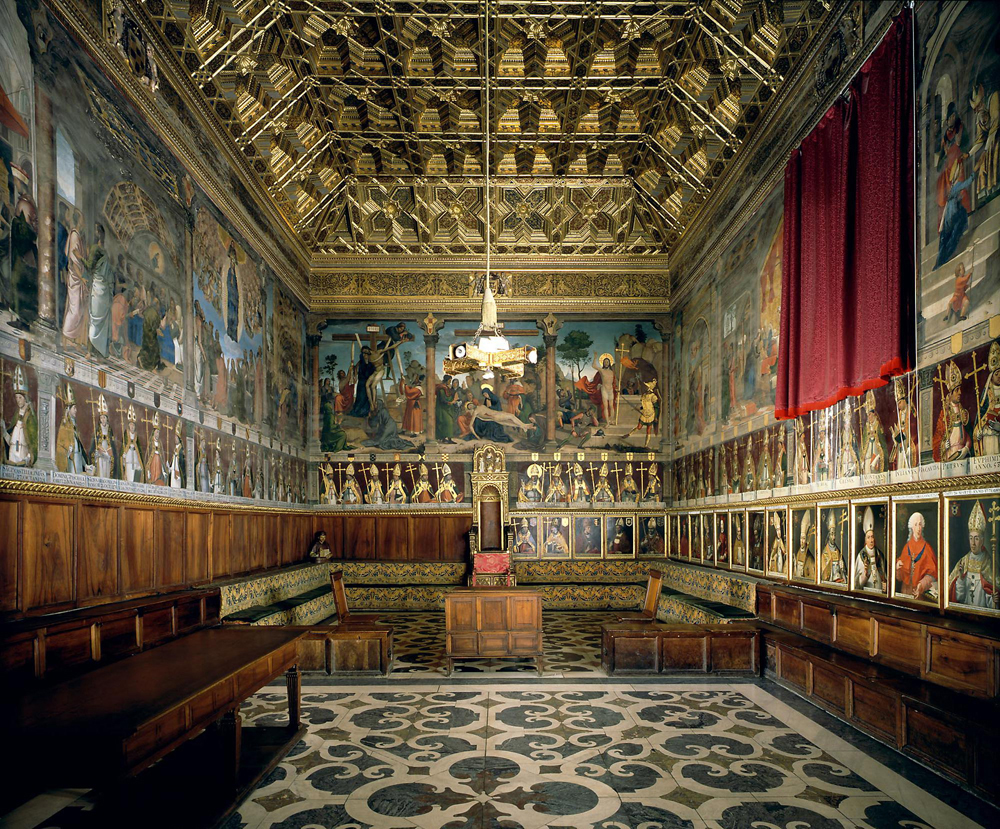
Late Renaissance grandeur at Toledo Cathedral, with wooden coffered ceiling

A chapter house or chapterhouse is a building or room that is part of a cathedral, monastery or collegiate church in which meetings are held. When attached to a cathedral, the cathedral chapter meets there. In monasteries, the whole community often met there daily for readings and to hear the abbot or senior monks talk. When attached to a collegiate church, the dean, prebendaries and canons of the college meet there. The rooms may also be used for other meetings of various sorts; in medieval times monarchs on tour in their territory would often take them over for their meetings and audiences. Synods, ecclesiastical courts and similar meetings often took place in chapter houses.

== Design ==
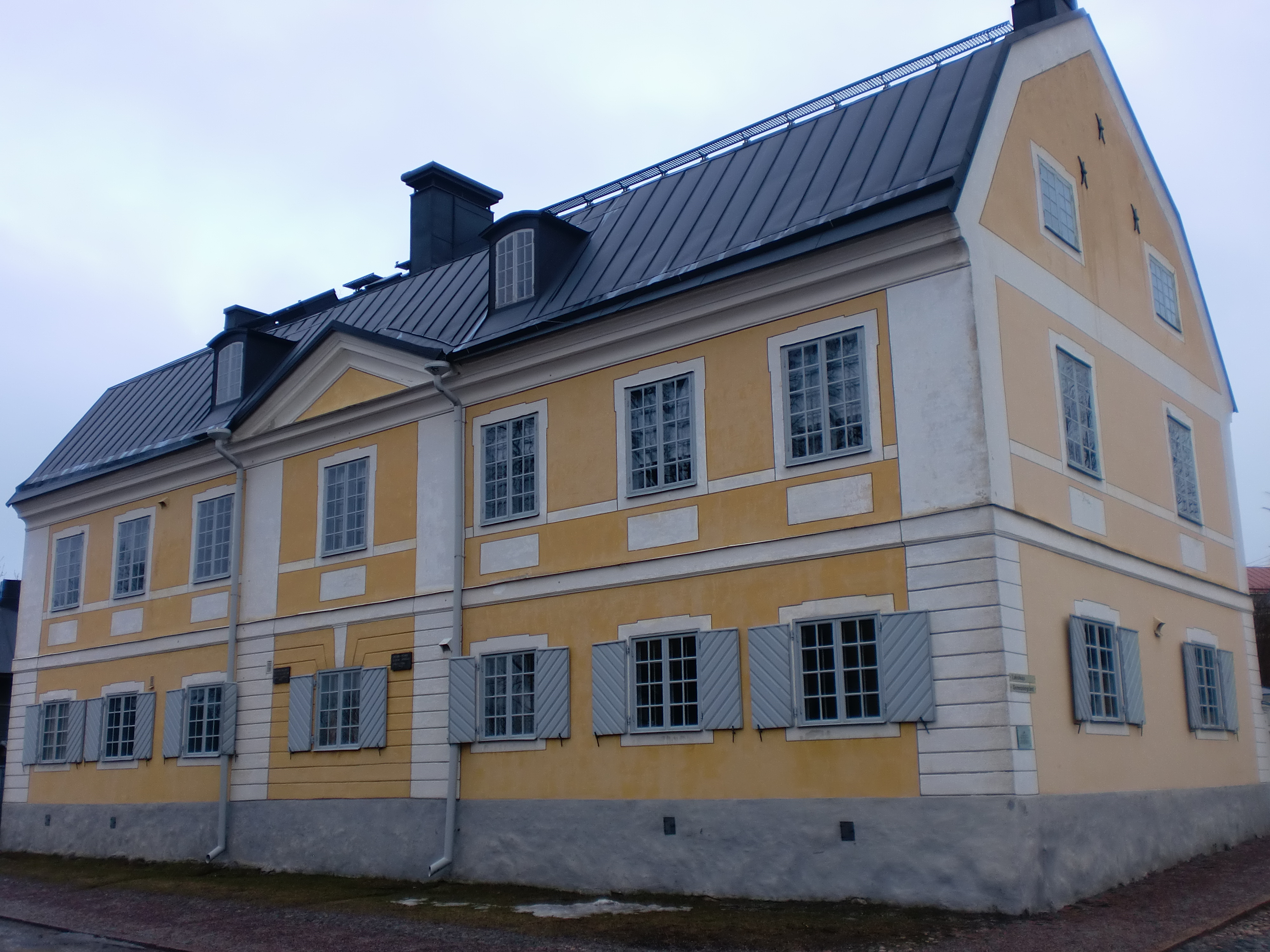
The chapter house from the 1750s in the old town of Porvoo, Finland

When part of a monastery, the chapter house is generally located on the eastern wing of the cloister, which is next to the church. Since many cathedrals in England were originally monastic foundations, this is a common arrangement there also. Elsewhere it may be a separate building. The chapter house comprises a large space, in order to hold all the monks of the monastery, and is often highly ornamented. Typically there is seating around, often built into, all the walls of the room, often in stone, with the central space left open. The seats for the senior members are often larger than the others, and may be raised on a dais. Usually there is only one doorway, and though the room is well-lit where the location allows, the windows are often too high to allow a view in from outside (or eavesdropping). Many larger chapter houses are designed with vestibules for attendants and those waiting to be called, where opening onto a cloister does not provide such a space. There is often a fireplace, and altars are found in some examples, sometimes added later.

Many medieval rooms use stone vaulting supported by columns in the centre of the space, as used for other more utilitarian large rooms in monasteries with a generous budget. Others have much higher roofs. The shape of the room is usually designed to allow good audibility for speakers from all parts of the room. It may be rectangular, tending towards the square, but octagonal and other near-circular plans are an English speciality, with that at Worcester Cathedral probably the earliest. Most, like those at Wells Cathedral, Lichfield Cathedral, Westminster Abbey and Lacock Abbey, have a single central column from which the high roof vaulting spreads. York Minster has a wooden roof and no central column. Many have elaborate benched arcades round the wall, with crocketed frames for the seats. English chapter houses tend to be more elaborate and highly decorated than Continental ones, and the octagonal shape allowed for spectacular displays of stained glass, now mostly lost, though not at York. Except at Westminster Abbey any paintings have been lost, but English designs, with their emphasis on carved arcades and windows, did not leave the large wall spaces found in most Continental chapter houses.

At Westminster the chapter house, opposite the Palace of Westminster, was used from the erection of the present building for royal meetings, including many of the royal council, and was the usual location for meetings of the House of Commons until the reign of Henry VIII. It was converted into the first home of what is now the Public Record Office (the national archives) soon after the English Reformation, and the late Gothic paintings added behind the seats (see gallery) were preserved hidden behind bookshelves until the 19th century.

In some Romanesque or Gothic monasteries, the entrance to the chapter house has an elaborate façade with a door surrounded by highly decorated archivolts, especially when it is a separate building. Many chapterhouses feature elaborate carving or frescos, which include some masterpieces of religious art, but were also sometimes secular. The paintings from Arlanza, now spread across museums in Spain and the United States, originally decorated the monastery of San Pedro de Arlanza, and contain huge bold mythical beasts that are some of the finest survivals of Romanesque palace decoration. In modern settings, the chapterhouse may simply be (or use) an ordinary office boardroom or meeting room. When it is a separate building, this often consists of just the single main room.

== History and uses ==
The community of monks would meet in the chapter house with the abbot to "hold chapter"; that is, "for the reading of the 'Martyrology' and the 'Necrology', for the correction of faults, the assigning of the tasks for the day, and for the exhortation of the superior, and again for the evening Collation or reading before Complin". The first meeting took place in the morning, after the church services of Prime or Terce. The monks might sit along the length of the walls in strict age-order, apart from the office-holders.

The Carolingian Plan of St Gall (c. 820) is the plan for an ideal 9th century monastery, with a great variety of buildings and rooms, but none that really can be assigned the function of chapterhouse; nor is such a room mentioned by Saint Benedict. But the chapter house is mentioned in the proceedings of the Council of Aachen in 816. The church or cloister may have been used for all meetings in earlier monasteries, or there was usually a refectory (hall for eating). But at least by 1000 such a room had become normal in large monastic establishments. The east side of the cloister, on which the chapter house was often located, was usually the first to be constructed; it would have been begun shortly after the church walls were built.

== Examples ==
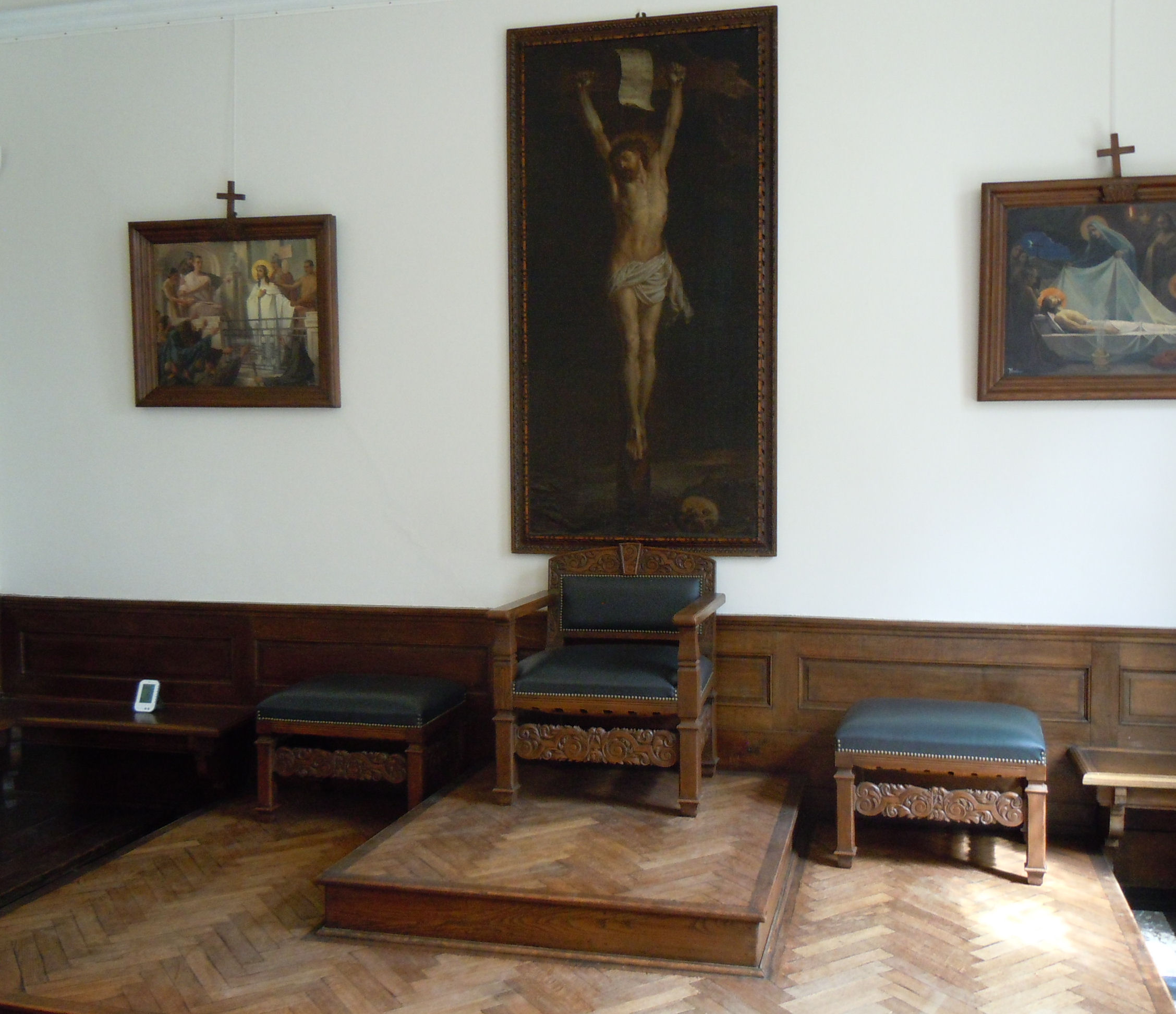
Chapter House of Bornem Abbey, with the Throne of the Abbot.

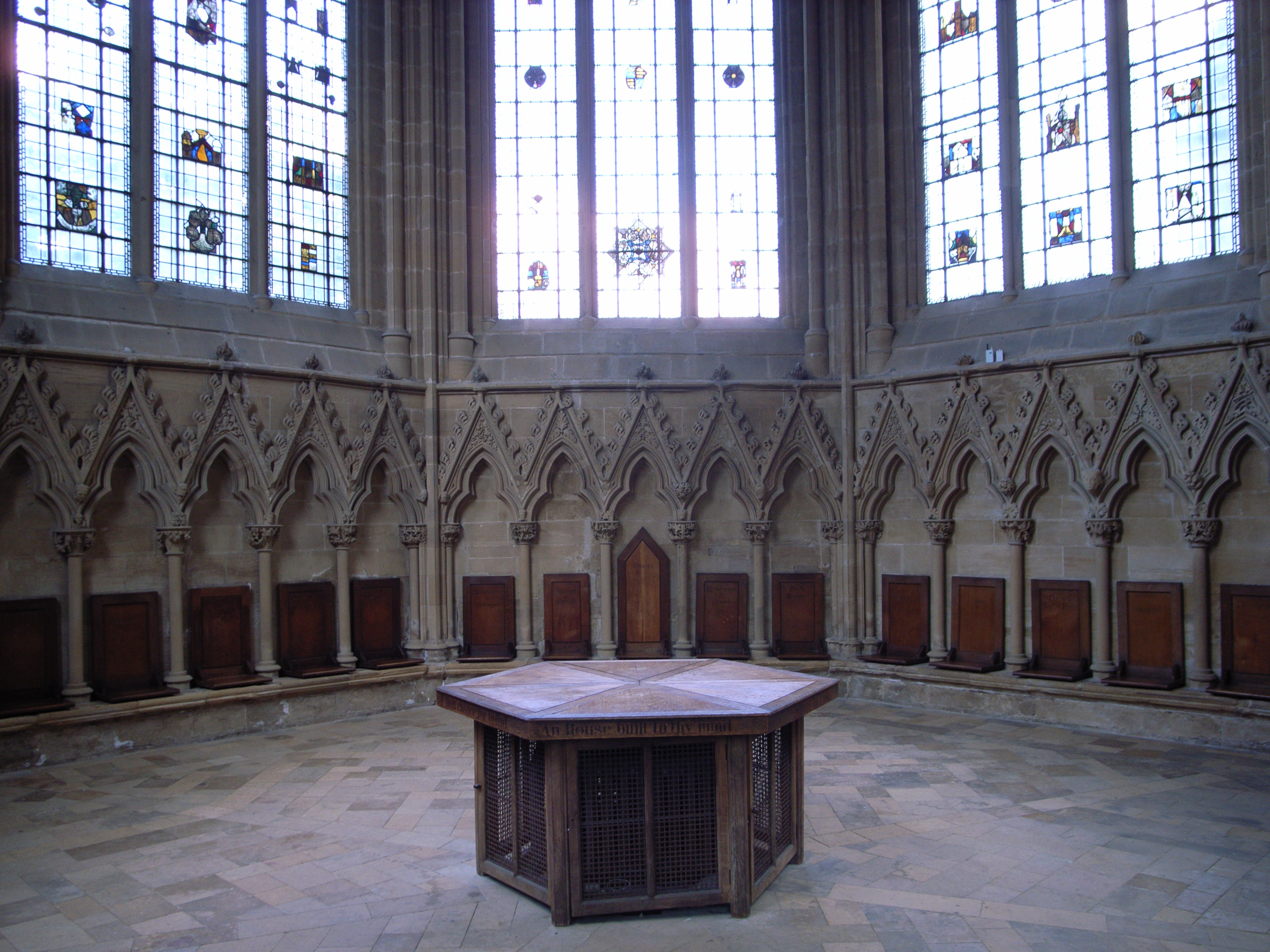
The Chapterhouse at Southwell Minster, Nottinghamshire

Important examples of chapter houses from an architectural or artistic point of view can be seen at:

- Monastery of Santa María de Sigena, Spain, whose very important Romanesque frescos are now in the Museu Nacional d'Art de Catalunya in Barcelona
- Elgin Cathedral - octagonal, unusually for Scotland
- Wąchock Abbey, Romanesque in Poland
- Westminster Abbey
- Canterbury Cathedral rectangular chapter house
- Wells Cathedral palm tree like central pillar carrying 32 lierne ribs that form the inner part of the vault
- Exeter Cathedral
- Lincoln Cathedral the earliest English octagonal annex
- Salisbury Cathedral
- Southwell Minster, with famous carved capitals
- York Minster octagonal Late Gothic
- Fontevraud Abbey, France, a Plantagenet base, large and low-vaulted
- The "Spanish Chapel" at the Dominican Basilica of Santa Maria Novella in Florence, with important frescos
- Alcobaça Monastery Romanesque, in central Portugal
- Batalha Monastery Late Gothic with Manueline elements, in central Portugal
- Convent of the Order of Christ in Tomar
- The Pazzi Chapel at the Franciscan Basilica di Santa Croce di Firenze, a key building in Early Renaissance architecture
- Toledo Cathedral, 16th century and later, with important frescos

Non-religious use of the circular chapter house style of plan:

- Library of Parliament, Parliament of Canada

== Gallery ==
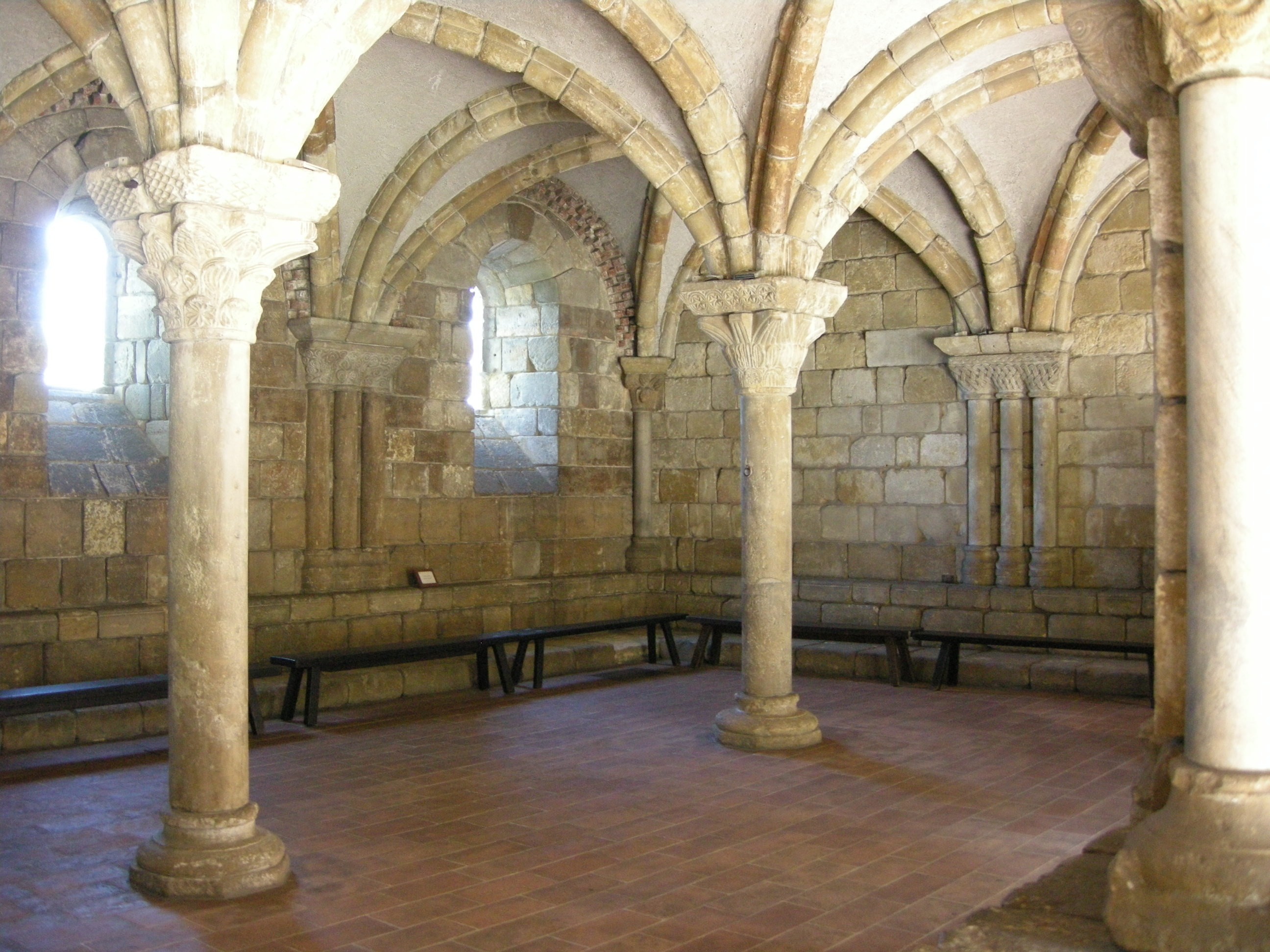
French Romanesque chapter house now moved to The Cloisters, New York

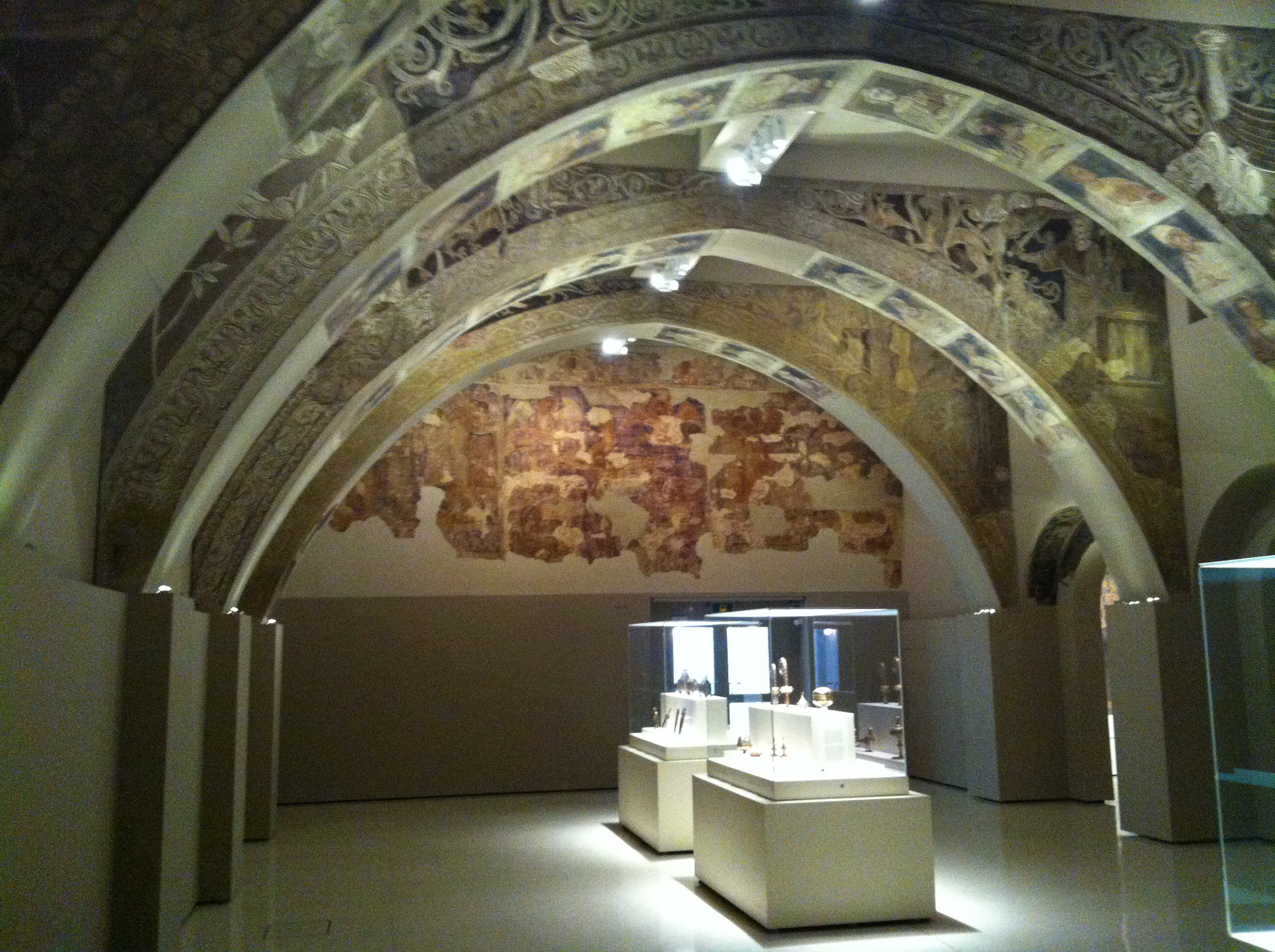
Museum installation of the Romanesque frescos from the Monastery of Santa María de Sigena

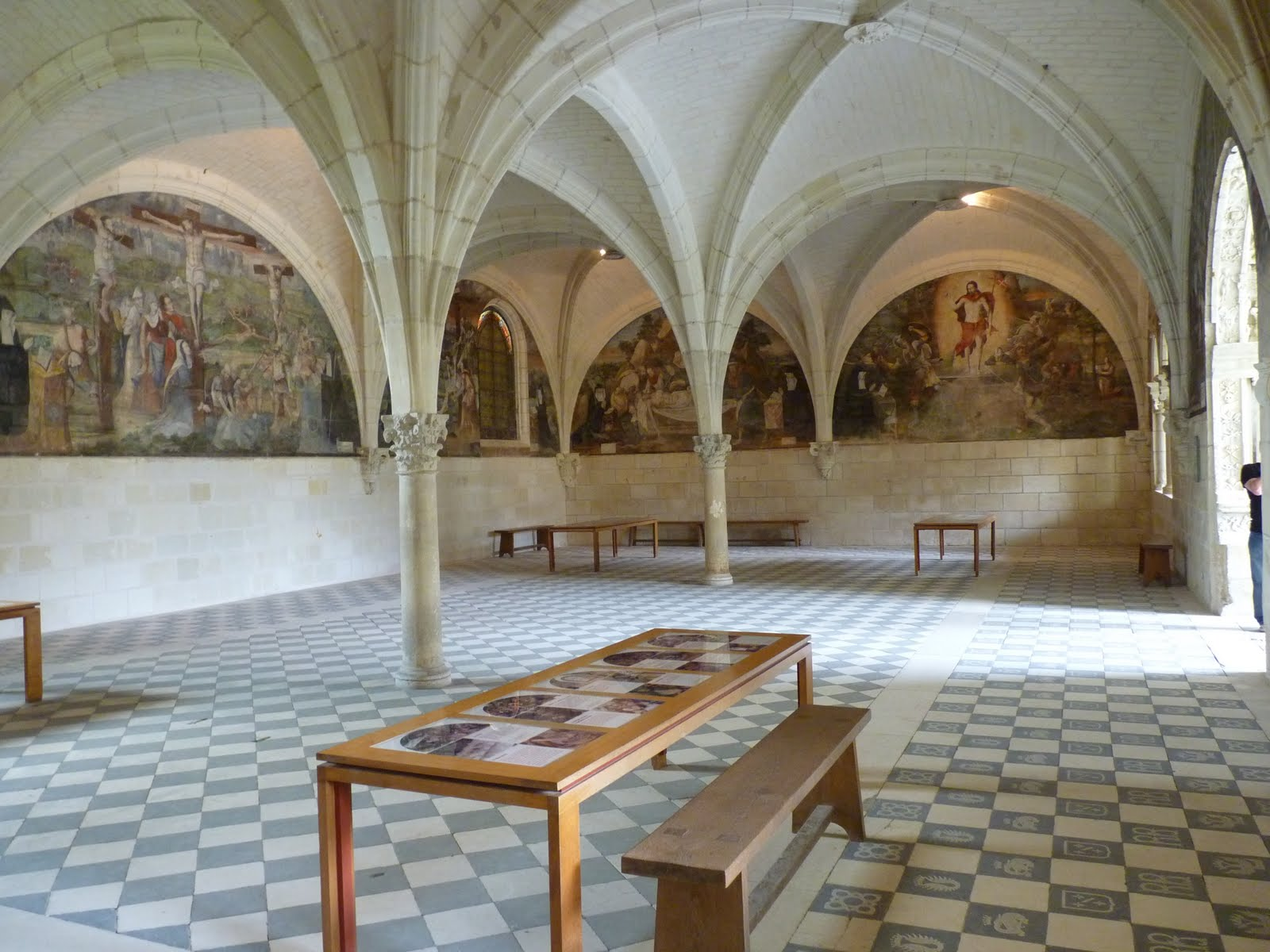
The royal Fontevraud Abbey

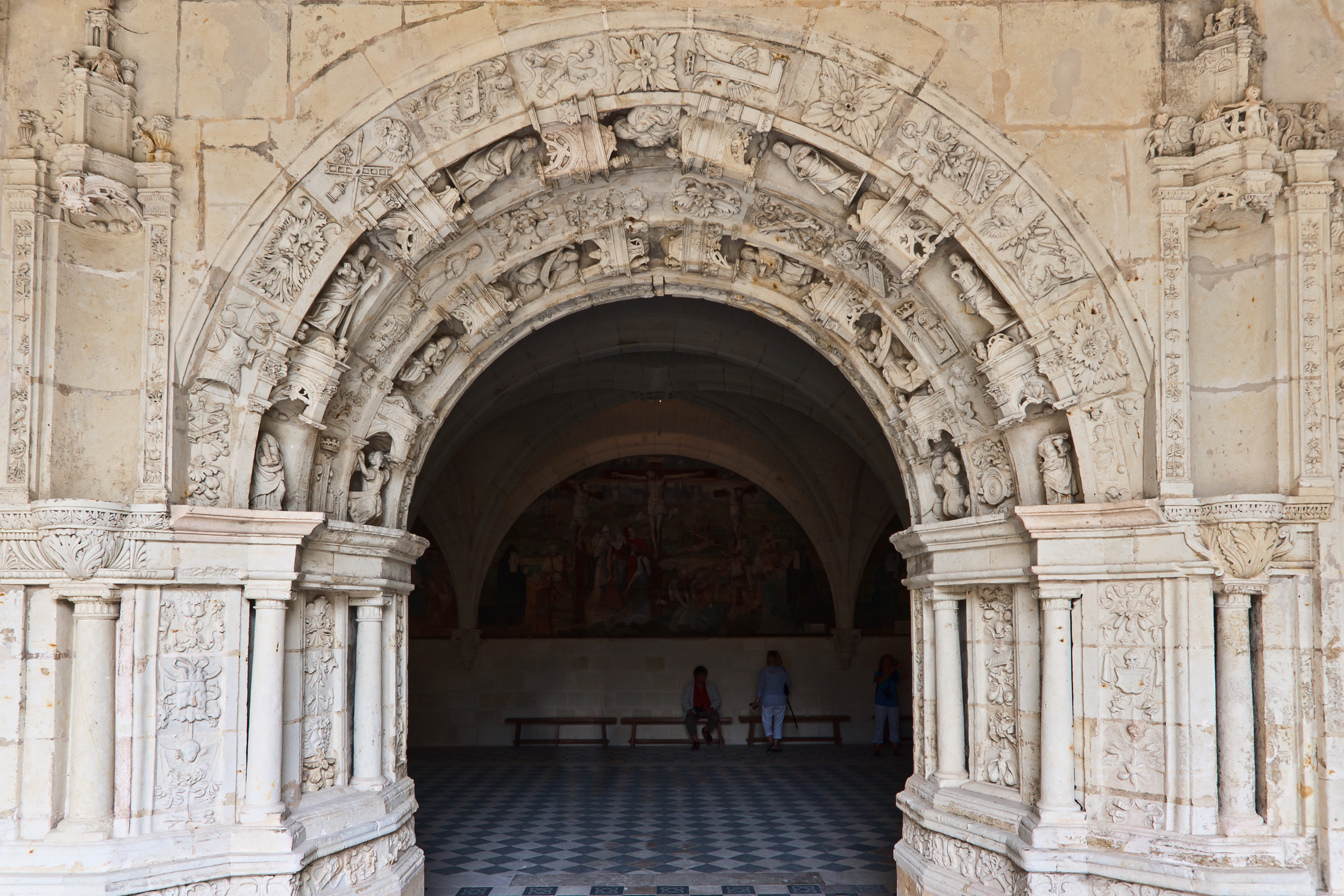
Entrance at Fontevraud Abbey

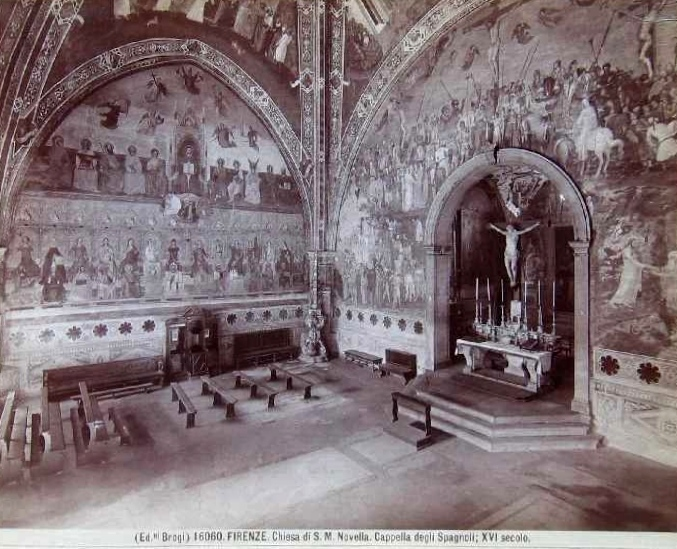
The former chapterhouse, now the "Spanish Chapel", at the Basilica of Santa Maria Novella in Florence

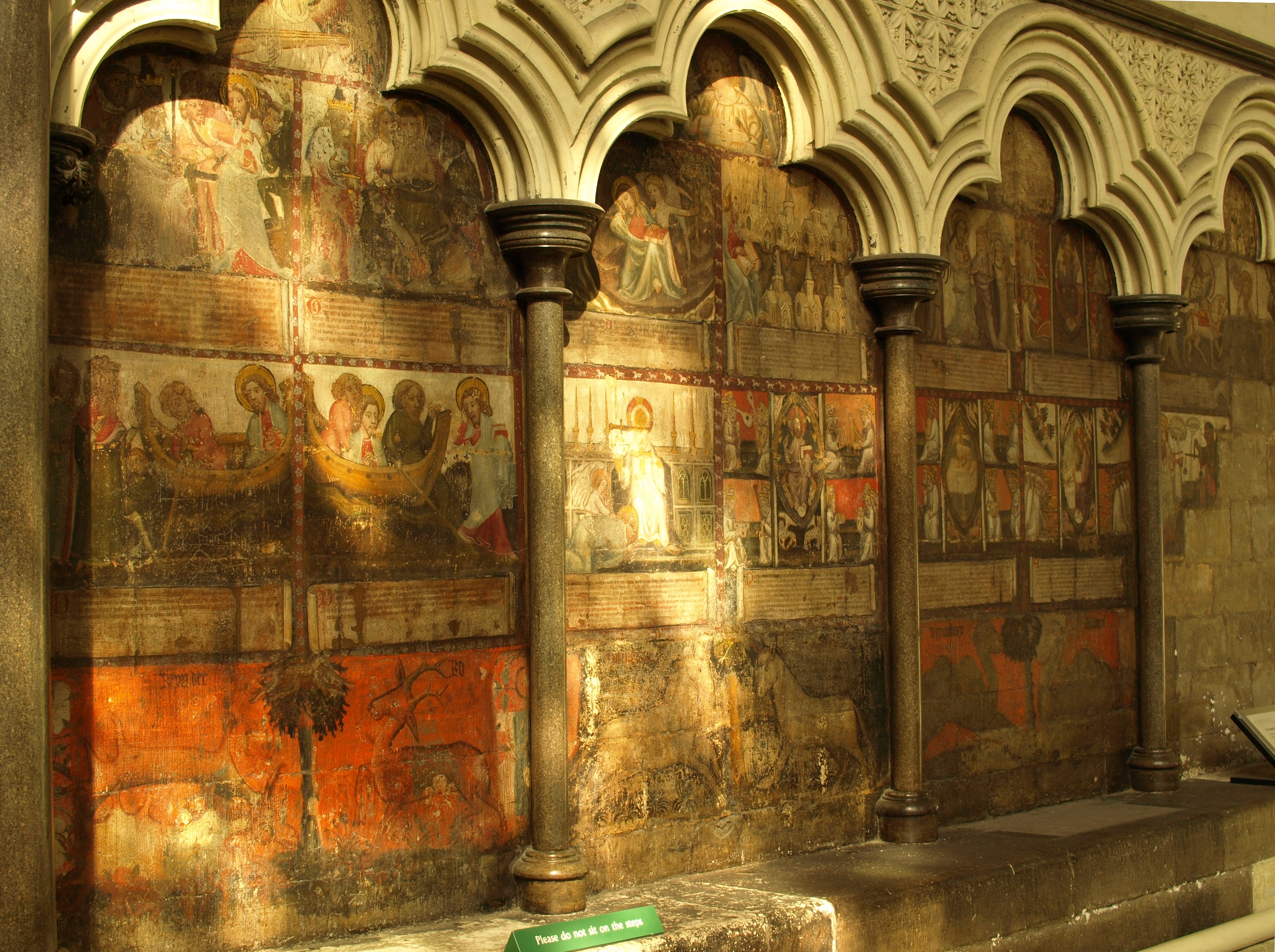
Westminster Abbey

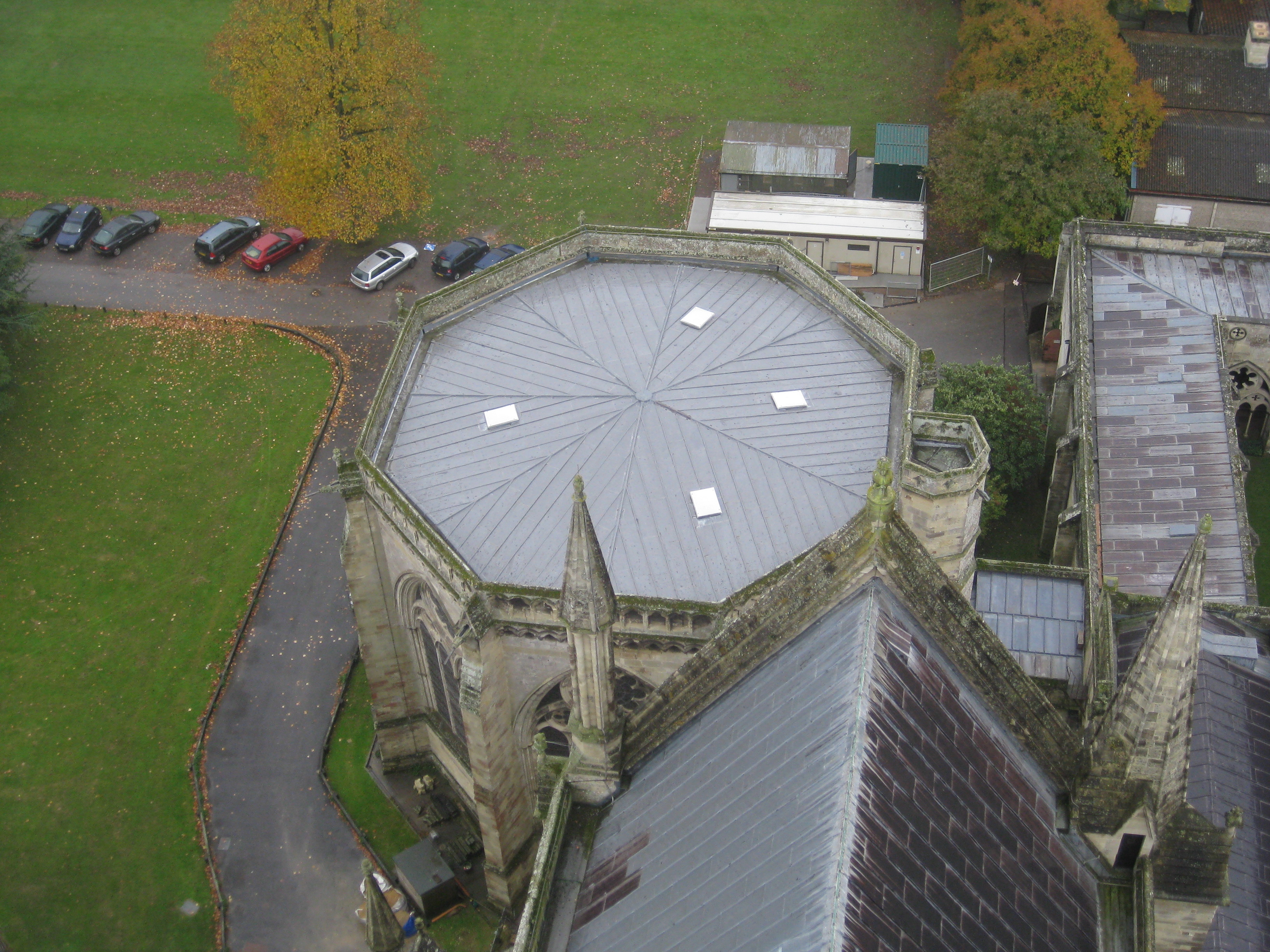
Salisbury Cathedral from the cathedral tower, with cloister at right

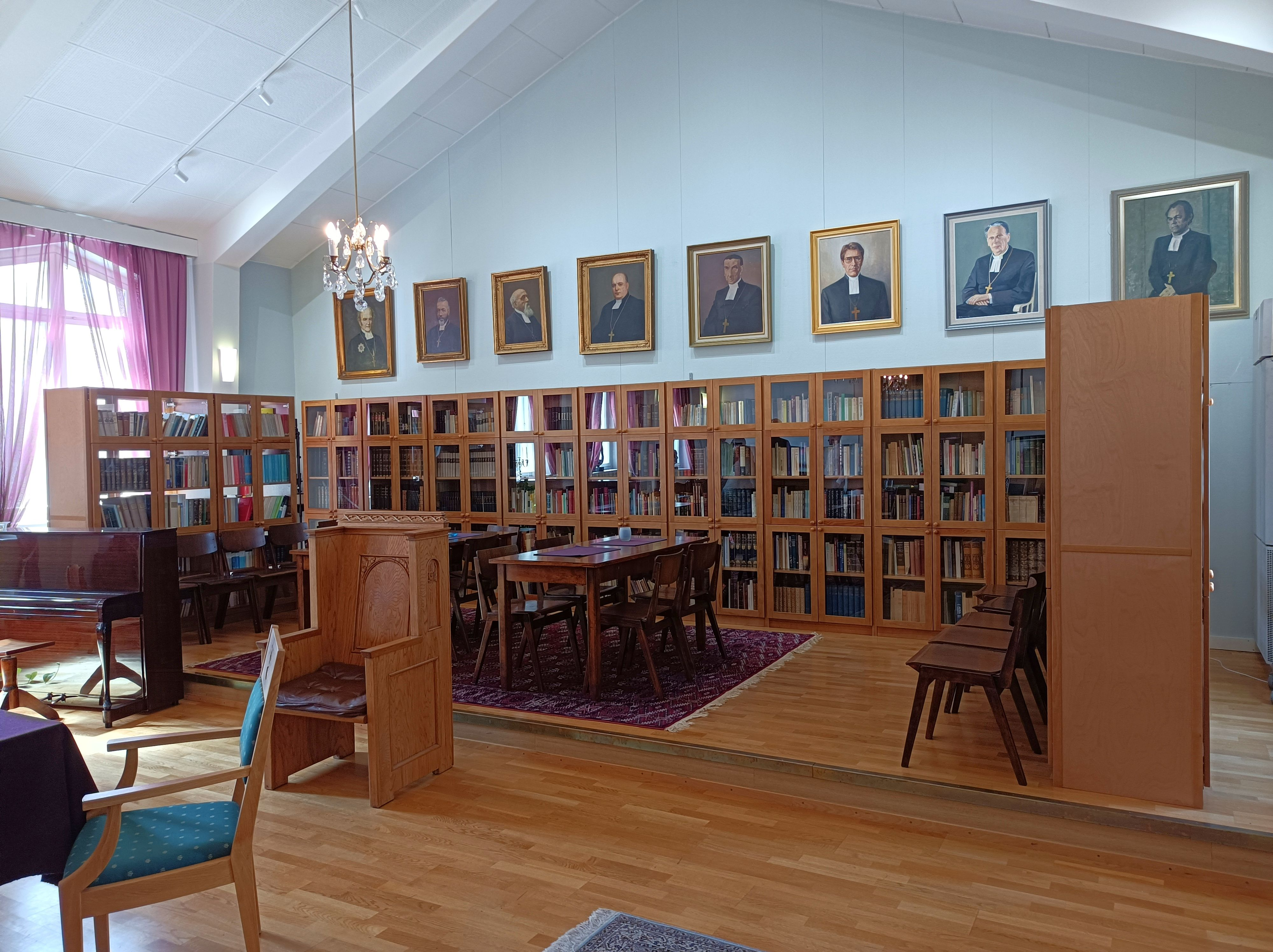
Interior of the chapter house of Kuopio Cathedral in Kuopio

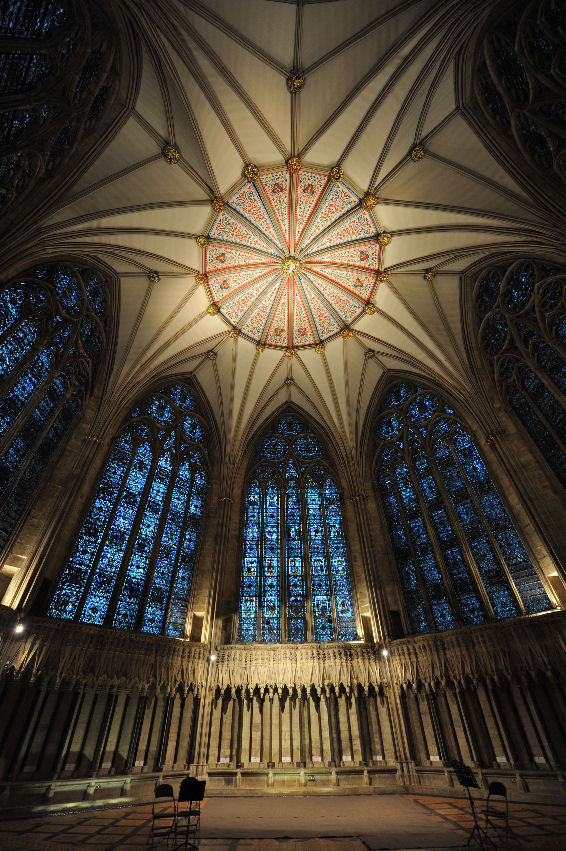
The octagonal chapter house at York Minster

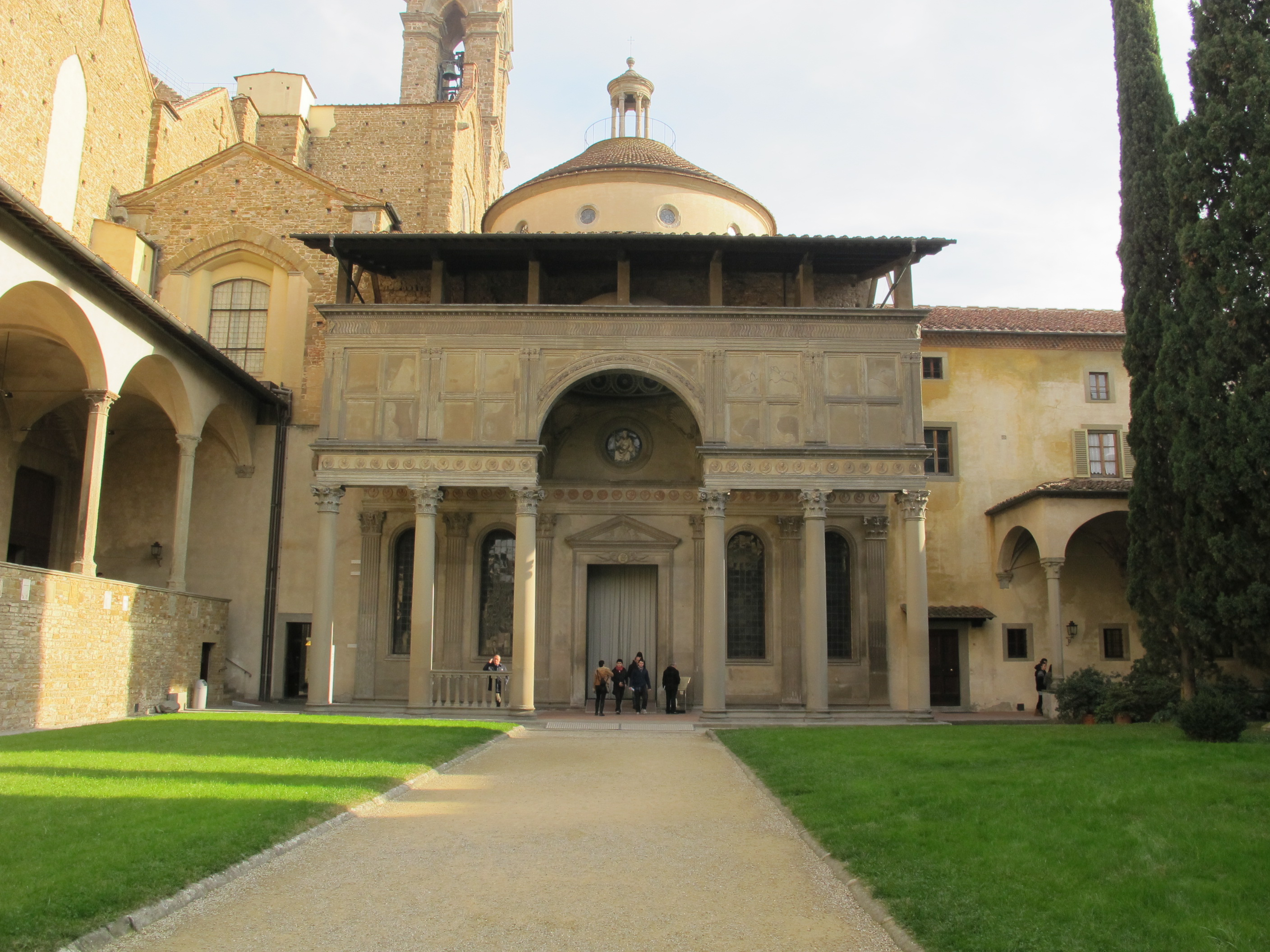
Exterior of the Pazzi Chapel

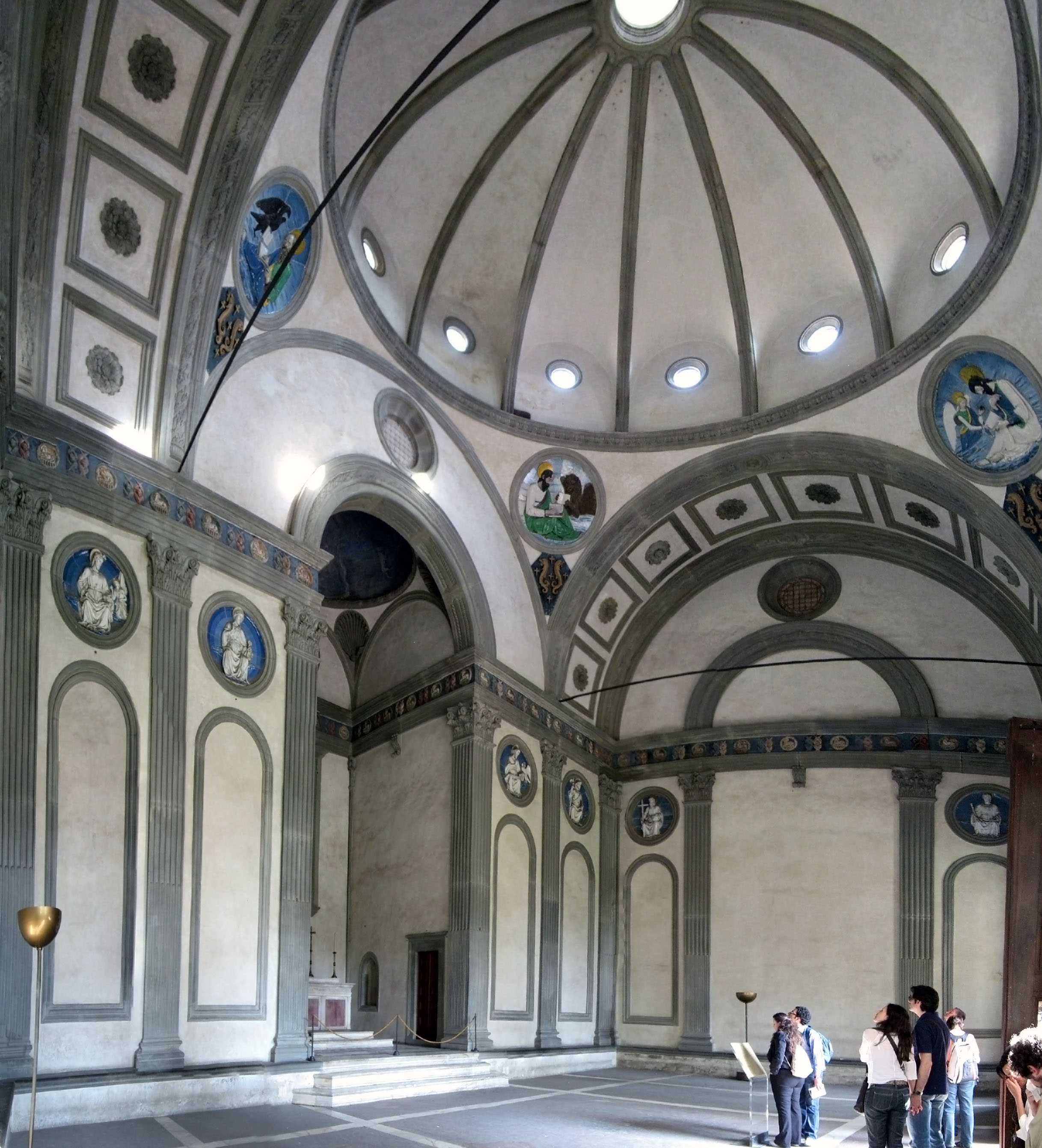
Interior of the Pazzi Chapel

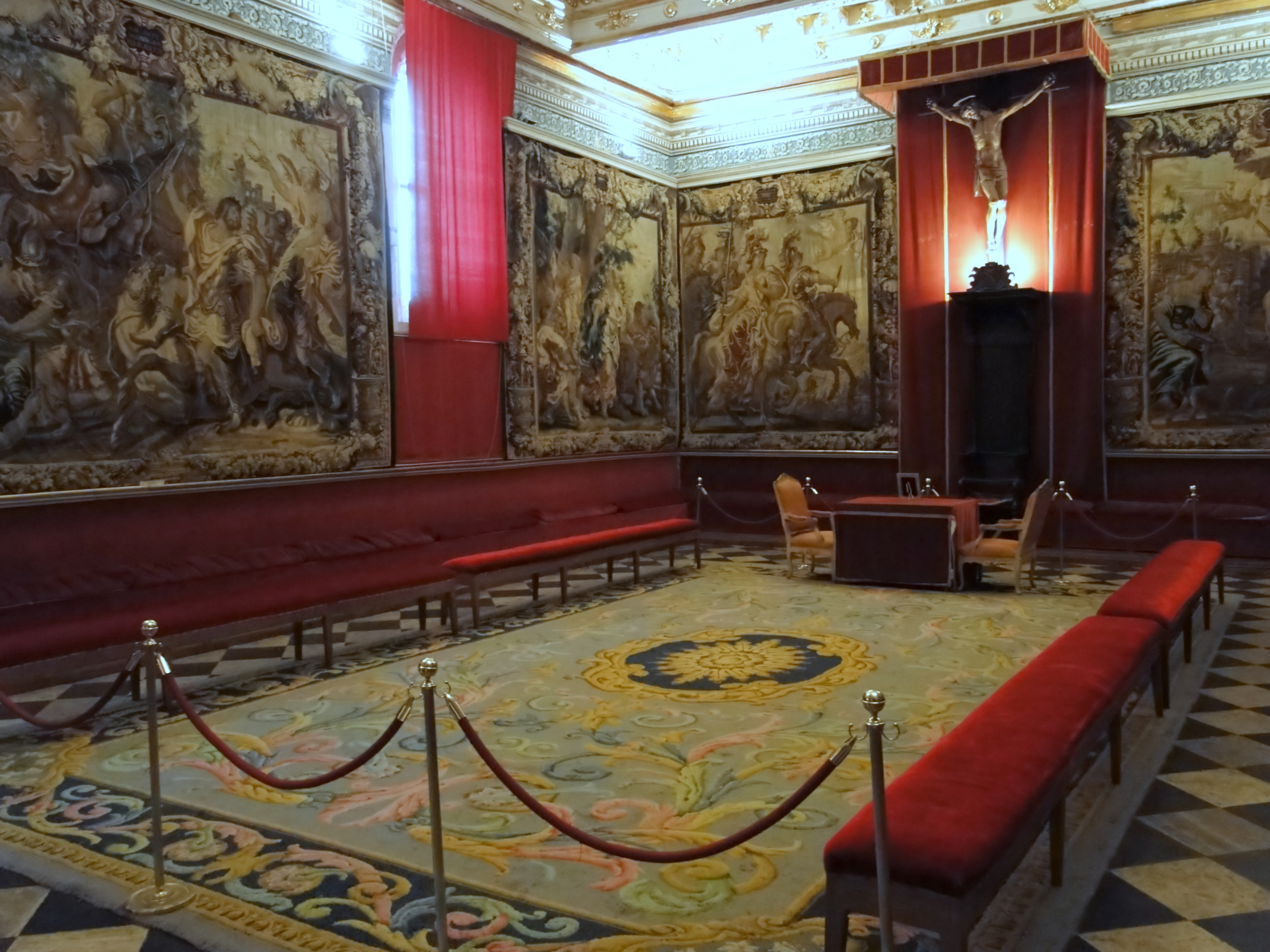
Segovia Cathedral

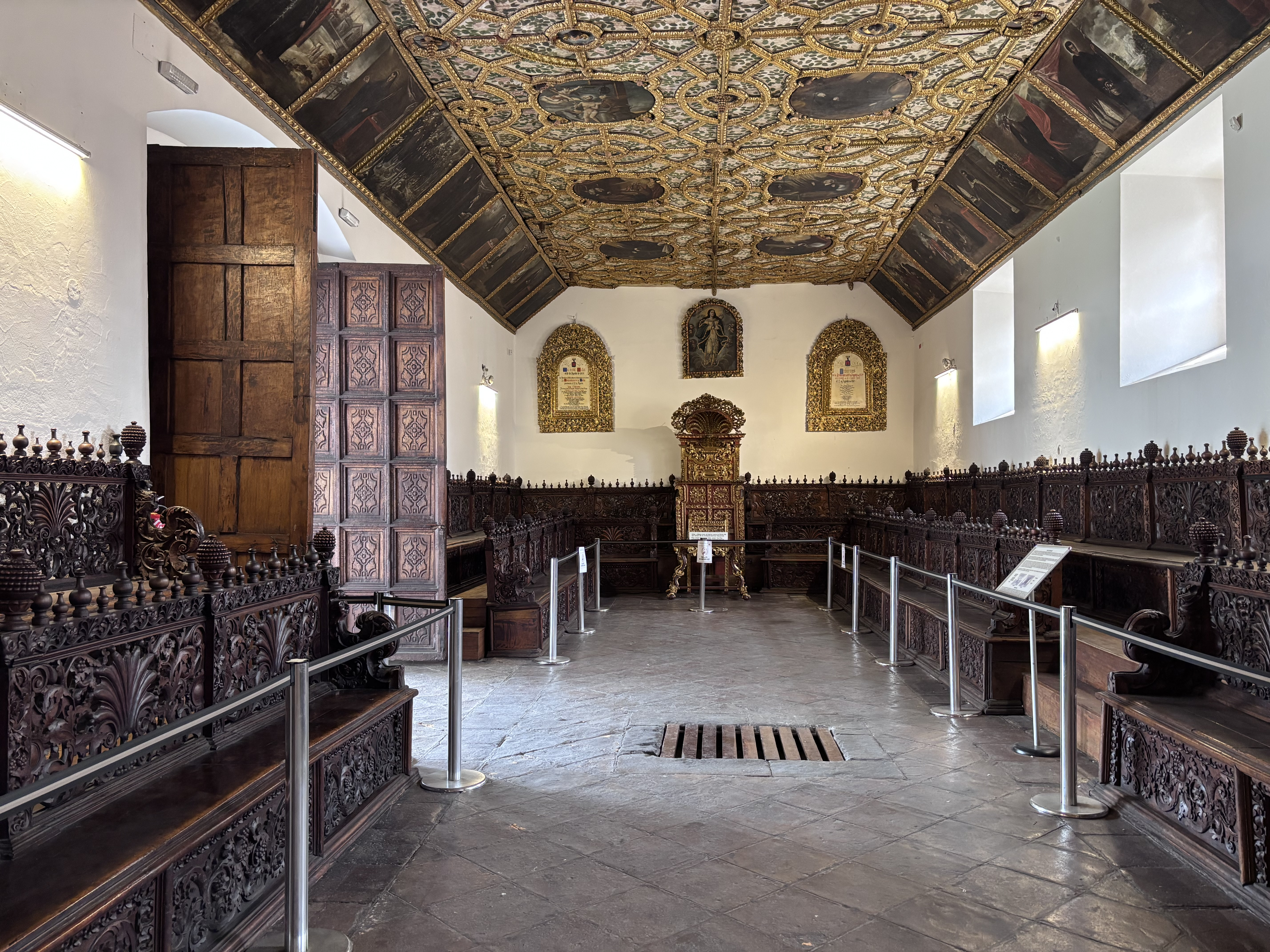
Chapter house of the Convent of San Agustín in Quito.

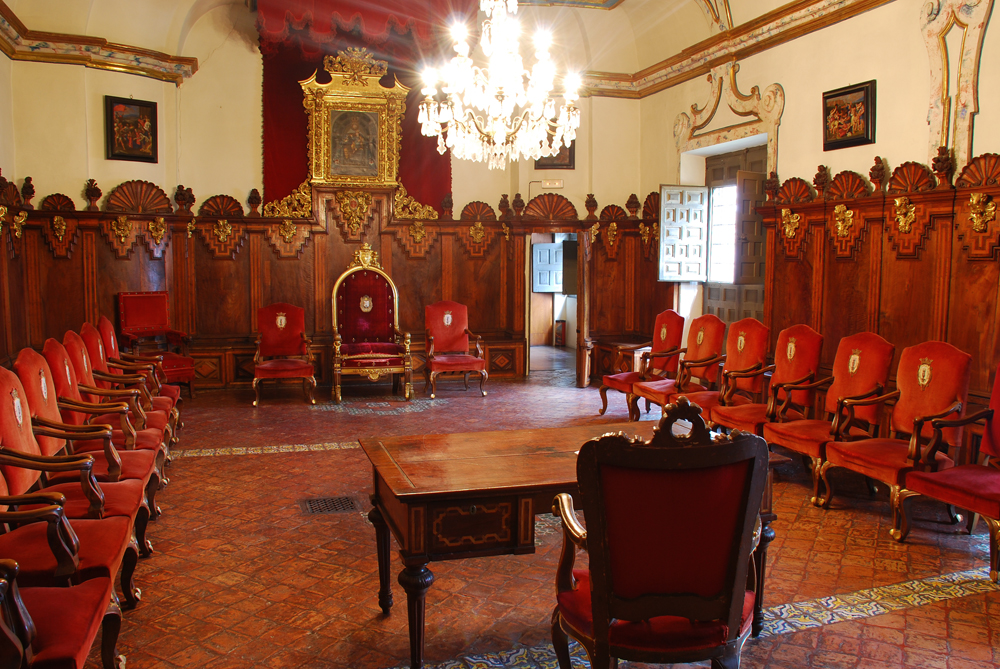
Pamplona Cathedral

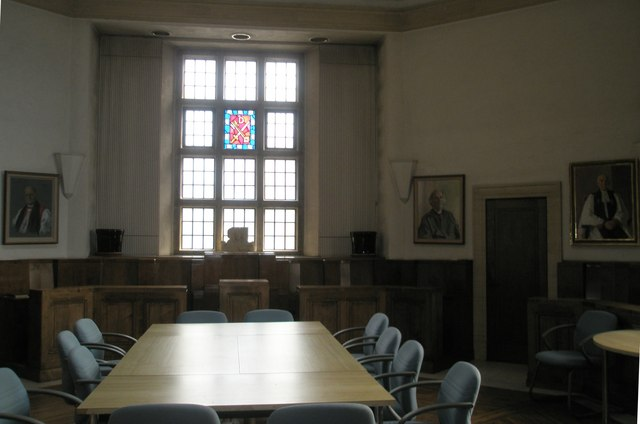
The modern boardroom-style Chapter house at Guildford Cathedral
