= The Martyrdom of Saint Bartholomew =

The Martyrdom of Saint Bartholomew may refer to:

- The Martyrdom of Saint Bartholomew by Jusepe de Ribera, 1630–1640
- The Martyrdom of Saint Bartholomew by Ribera, 1634
- The Martyrdom of Saint Bartholomew by Ribera, 1644
- The Martyrdom of Saint Bartholomew by Giovanni Battista Tiepolo, 1722

== See also ==
- Bartholomew_the_Apostle#Tradition
