= Albanopolis, Armenia =

City likely in ancient Armenia

Albanopolis was a city, most likely in ancient Armenia, known in Christianity as being the location at which the apostle Bartholomew was crucified or flayed alive.

== Historical accounts ==
In Lives of the Saints, 18th-century hagiographer Alban Butler says "The popular traditions concerning St Bartholomew are summed up in the Roman Martyrology, which says he 'preached the gospel of Christ in India; thence he went into Greater Armenia, and when he had converted many people there to the faith he was flayed alive by the barbarians, and by command of King Astyages fulfilled his martyrdom'". However, Butler himself cautions about taking the geographical clues too literally. He points out that "'India' was a name applied indifferently by Greek and Latin writers to Arabia, Ethiopia, Libya, Parthia, Persia and the lands of the Medes".

== Location ==
Nonetheless, at least three locations have been proposed as possible sites of Albanopolis: Derbend in Dagestan, Albyrak/Albac near Başkale in the then Armenian region of what is now eastern Turkey, and Baku, Azerbaijan. The latter has a certain ring of truth given that the area of today's Azerbaijan was historically known as Albania but no conclusive evidence has been found of any such theory. Butler is also sceptical of the Albyrak suggestion stating while the assertion that Batholomew "preached and died in Armenia is possible, and is a unanimous tradition among the later historians of that country; ... earlier Armenian writers make little or no reference to him as connected with their nation". Thus although a very holy Armenian Monastery guarded what was believed to be Bartholomew's tomb on the site, this was probably a later idea.
