= The Martyrdom of Saint Bartholomew (Ribera, 1644) =

Painting by Jusepe de Ribera

Martyrdom of Saint Bartholomew
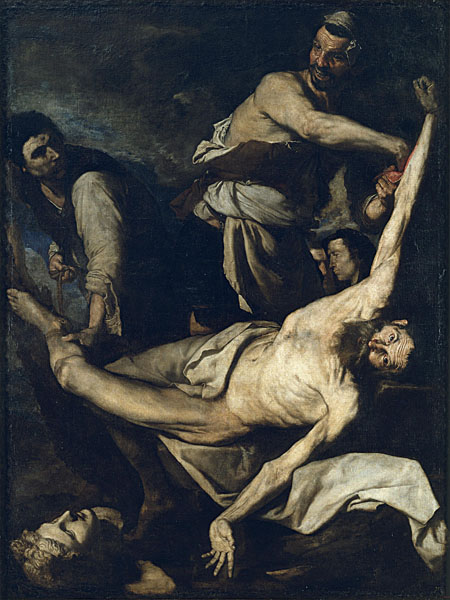
- Artist: Jusepe de Ribera
- Year: 1644
- Medium: Oil on canvas
- Dimensions: 202 cm × 153 cm (80 in × 60 in)
- Location: Museu Nacional d'Art de Catalunya, Barcelona

The Martyrdom of Saint Bartholomew is a painting by Jusepe de Ribera conserved at the National Art Museum of Catalonia.

== Description ==
The painting illustrates martyrdom and physical torment. The almost naked apostle Bartholomew looks at us helplessly, while a sadistic drunken executioner delightedly flays him. On the ground, a classical sculpture, which has been identified as the god Baldach, and in the background two priests, their heads covered, are witnesses to the torture. The painting follows the text by Jacobus de Voragine in the 'Golden Legend', which is the Christian version of the fable of the satyr Marsyas, who suffered the same punishment as Saint Bartholomew. This is a work demonstrating the excellent art of Lo Spagnoletto. Before entering its present home it belonged to the illustrator Alexandre de Riquer.
