= Bartholomew the Apostle =

Apostle of Jesus

Saint Bartholomew the Apostle
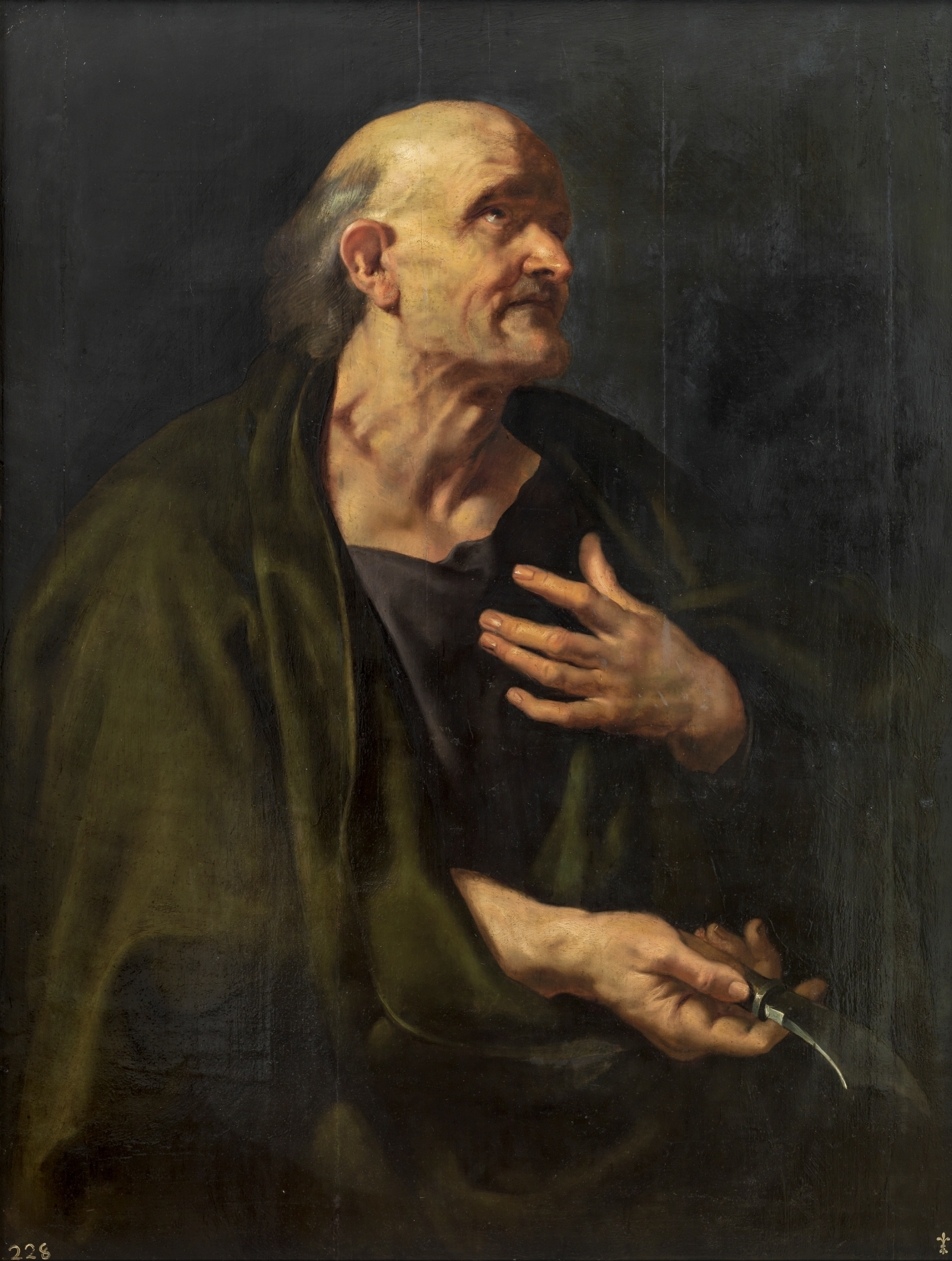
- St Bartholomew by Rubens, c. 1611

Apostle and Martyr
- Born: c. 17 BC; Cana, Galilee, Roman Empire
- Died: c. 69/71 AD; Albanopolis, Kingdom of Armenia
- Venerated in: All Christian denominations which venerate saints
- Major shrine: Saint Bartholomew Monastery in Eastern Turkey (former Greater Armenia); relics at Basilica of San Bartolomeo in Benevento, Italy; Saint Bartholomew-on-the-Tiber Church, Rome; Canterbury Cathedral; the cathedrals in Frankfurt and Plzeň; San Bartolomeo Cathedral in Lipari
- Feast: 24 August (Western Christianity); 11 June (with St. Barnabas) (Eastern Christianity); 25 August (translation of relics, with Saint Titus) (Eastern Christianity); 29 August (Syriac Orthodox)
- Attributes: Knife and his flayed skin; Red Martyrdom
- Patronage: Armenia; bookbinders; butchers; Florentine cheese and salt merchants; Gambatesa, Bojano, Italy; Catbalogan, Samar; Magalang, Pampanga; Malabon, Metro Manila; Nagcarlan, Laguna; San Leonardo, Nueva Ecija, Philippines; Għargħur, Malta; leather workers; neurological diseases; skin diseases; dermatology; plasterers; shoemakers; curriers; tanners; trappers; twitching; whiteners; Los Cerricos, Spain; Barva, Costa Rica

Bartholomew (Note: Aramaic: ܒܪ ܬܘܠܡܝ; Ancient Greek: Βαρθολομαῖος, romanized: Bartholomaîos; Latin: Bartholomaeus; Armenian: Բարթողիմէոս; Coptic: ⲃⲁⲣⲑⲟⲗⲟⲙⲉⲟⲥ; Hebrew: בר-תולמי, romanized: bar-Tôlmay; Arabic: بَرثُولَماوُس, romanized: Barthulmāwus) was one of the twelve apostles of Jesus according to the New Testament. Most scholars today identify Bartholomew as Nathanael, who appears in the Gospel of John (1:45–51; cf. 21:2).

== New Testament references ==
The name Bartholomew (Greek: Βαρθολομαῖος, transliterated "Bartholomaios") comes from the Imperial Aramaic: בר-תולמי bar-Tolmay "son of Tolmai" or "son of the furrows". Bartholomew is listed in the New Testament among the Twelve Apostles of Jesus in the three Synoptic Gospels: Matthew, Mark, and Luke, and in Acts of the Apostles.

== Tradition ==
Eusebius of Caesarea's Ecclesiastical History (5:10) states that after the Ascension, Bartholomew went on a missionary tour to India, where he left behind a copy of the Gospel of Matthew. Tradition narrates that he served as a missionary in Mesopotamia and Parthia, as well as Lycaonia and Ethiopia in other accounts. Popular traditions say that Bartholomew preached the Gospel in India and then went to Greater Armenia.

=== Mission to India ===
Two ancient testimonies exist about the mission of Saint Bartholomew in India. These are by Eusebius of Caesarea (early 4th century) and by Saint Jerome (late 4th century). Both of these refer to this tradition while speaking of the reported visit of Saint Pantaenus to India in the 2nd century. The studies of Fr A.C. Perumalil SJ and Moraes hold that the Bombay region on the Konkan coast, a region which may also have been known as the ancient city Kalyan, was the field of Saint Bartholomew's missionary activities. Previously the consensus among scholars was at least skeptical about an apostolate of Saint Bartholomew in India. Stallings (1703), Neander (1853), Hunter (1886), Rae (1892), and Zaleski (1915) supported it, while scholars such as Sollerius (1669), Carpentier (1822), Harnack (1903), Medlycott (1905), Mingana (1926), Thurston (1933), Attwater (1935), etc. do not. The main argument is that the India that Eusebius and Jerome refer to should be identified as Ethiopia or Arabia Felix.

=== In Armenia ===
Along with his fellow apostle Jude "Thaddeus", Bartholomew is reputed to have brought and preached Christianity to Armenia in the 1st century; as a result, in 301 the Armenian kingdom became the first state in history to embrace Christianity officially. Thus, both saints are considered the patron saints of the Armenian Apostolic Church. According to these traditions, Bartholomew is the second Catholicos-Patriarch of the Armenian Apostolic Church.

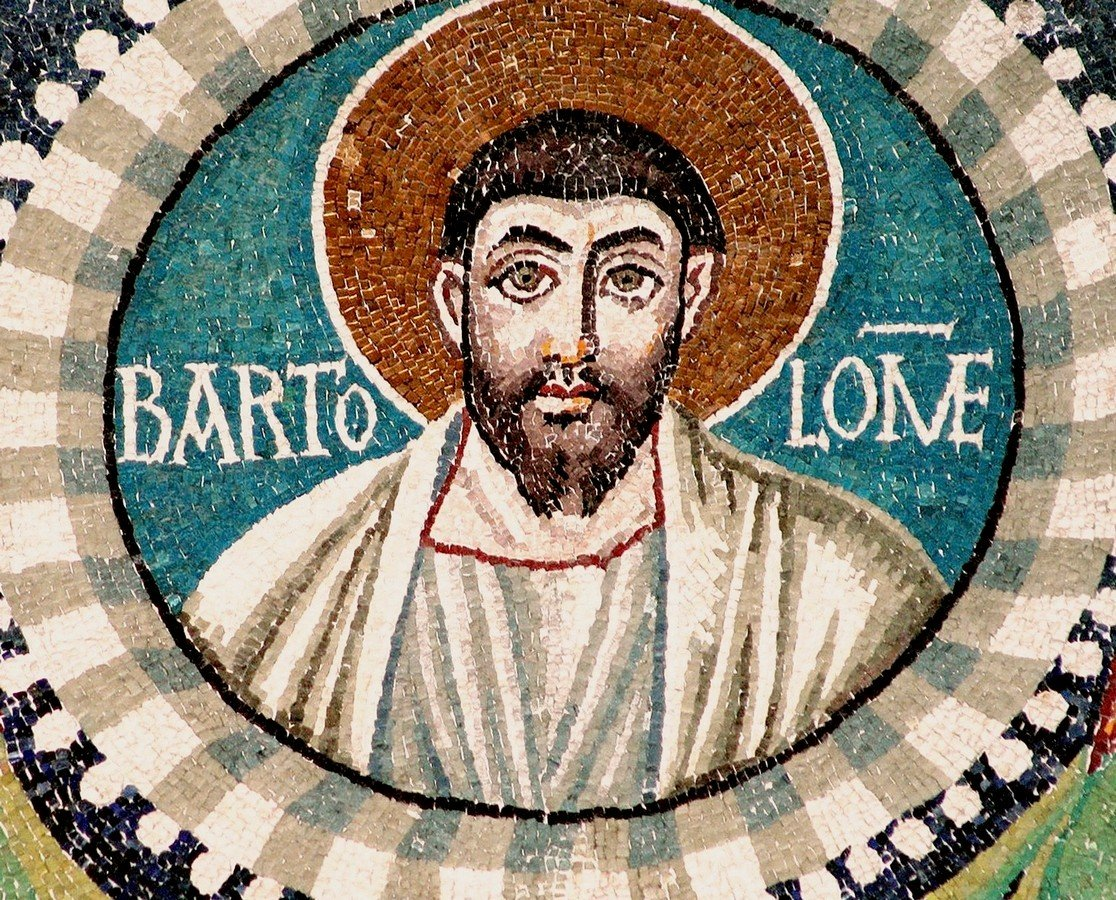
Bartholomew the Apostle, detail of the mosaic in the Basilica of San Vitale, Ravenna, 6th century

Christian tradition offers three accounts of Bartholomew's death: "One speaks of his being kidnapped, beaten unconscious, and cast into the sea to drown."

In the Hellenic tradition, Bartholomew was executed in Albanopolis in Armenia, where he was martyred for having converted Polymius, the local king, to Christianity. Enraged by the monarch's conversion, and fearing a Roman backlash, King Polymius's brother, Prince Astyages, ordered Bartholomew's torture and execution. However, this version of the story appears ahistorical, as there are no records of any Armenian king of the Arsacid dynasty of Armenia with the name "Polymius". Other accounts of his martyrdom name the king as either Agrippa (identified with Tigranes VI), or Sanatruk, king of Armenia.

The 13th-century Saint Bartholomew Monastery was a prominent Armenian monastery constructed at the presumed site of Bartholomew's martyrdom in Vaspurakan, Greater Armenia (now in southeastern Turkey).

=== In the Visions of Anne Catherine Emmerich ===
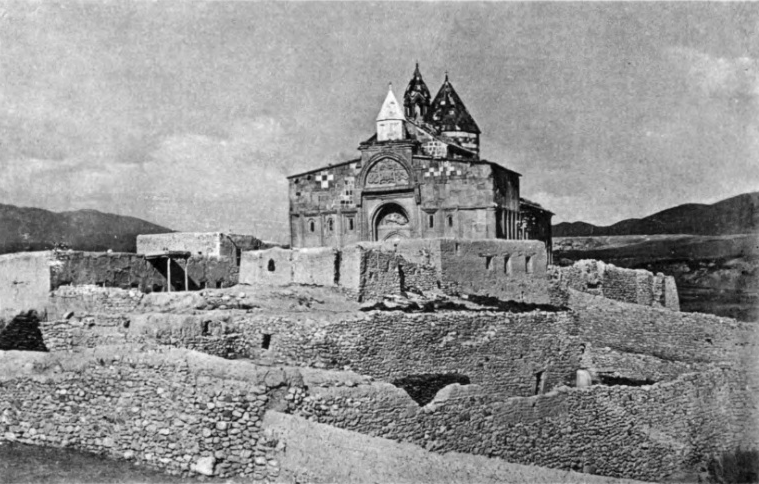
Ruins of the Saint Bartholomew Monastery at the alleged site of the Apostle's martyrdom in Armenia

According to the Visions of the Apostles, Martyrs and Saints recorded by Blessed Anne Catherine Emmerich (1774–1824), Saint Bartholomew first preached the Christian faith in India, where he made numerous converts and left behind several disciples.

Emmerich's account relates that the apostle journeyed eastward, passing through Japan before returning west by way of Arabia and the Red Sea to Abyssinia (modern-day Ethiopia). There, he is said to have converted King Polymius, raised a man from the dead, and silenced a local idol that had previously spoken to the people. When Bartholomew commanded the demon inhabiting the idol to reveal its deceptions, the spirit confessed that the supposed healings attributed to the idol were illusions meant to maintain idol worship among the populace.

Following this event, the king and his household were baptized, and Bartholomew consecrated the former pagan temple to the worship of the true God. He then healed the sick and became widely loved by the people. However, priests of the old cult later accused him before Astyages, the king's brother, who ordered his arrest and torture. Emmerich describes Bartholomew's martyrdom by flaying, during which he continued to preach until his death. His followers are said to have recovered his body and buried it honorably, over which a church was later constructed.

The vision concludes with the conversion of Astyages, while the idol priests are depicted as dying miserably soon afterward. Emmerich also notes that some exegetes have erroneously identified Bartholomew with Nathanael; however, in her visions the two were distinct. Bartholomew (son of Tolmai, of the tribe of Naphtali) preached in India and Armenia, while Nathanael evangelized in Mauretania and Brittany, dying in Tréguier, Brittany. Furthermore, regarding the scene in which Jesus glanced at Nathanael under the fig tree in order to move him deeply, she noted that Jesus also gave Bartholomew a glance, which deeply touched him.

== Veneration ==
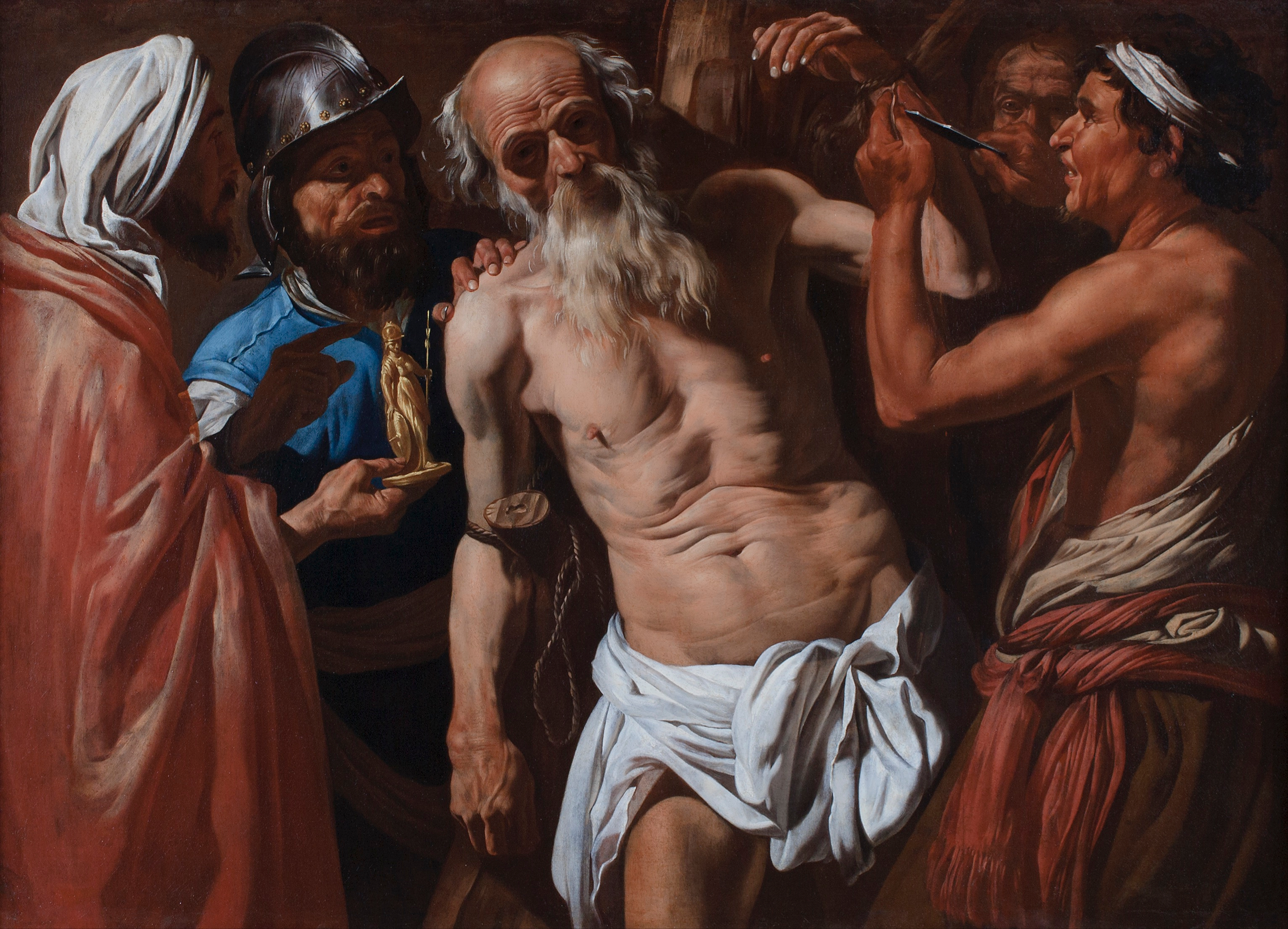
Martyrdom of St. Bartholomew by Matthias Stom

The Armenian Apostolic Church honours Saint Bartholomew and Saint Thaddeus as its patron saints.

The Eastern Orthodox Church venerates Bartholomew on June 11. Bartholomew is also venerated on August 25 in commemoration of the transfer of Bartholomew's relics. He is also venerated as one of the twelve apostles on June 30.

In the Synaxarium of the Coptic Orthodox Church of Alexandria, Bartholomew's martyrdom is commemorated on the first day of the Coptic calendar (i.e., the first day of the month of Thout), which currently falls on 11 September (corresponding to 29 August in the Julian calendar).

In the current Roman General Calendar Saint Bartholomew's feast occurs on 24 August.

Bartholomew the Apostle is remembered in the Church of England and all other Anglican churches with a Festival on 24 August.

== Relics ==
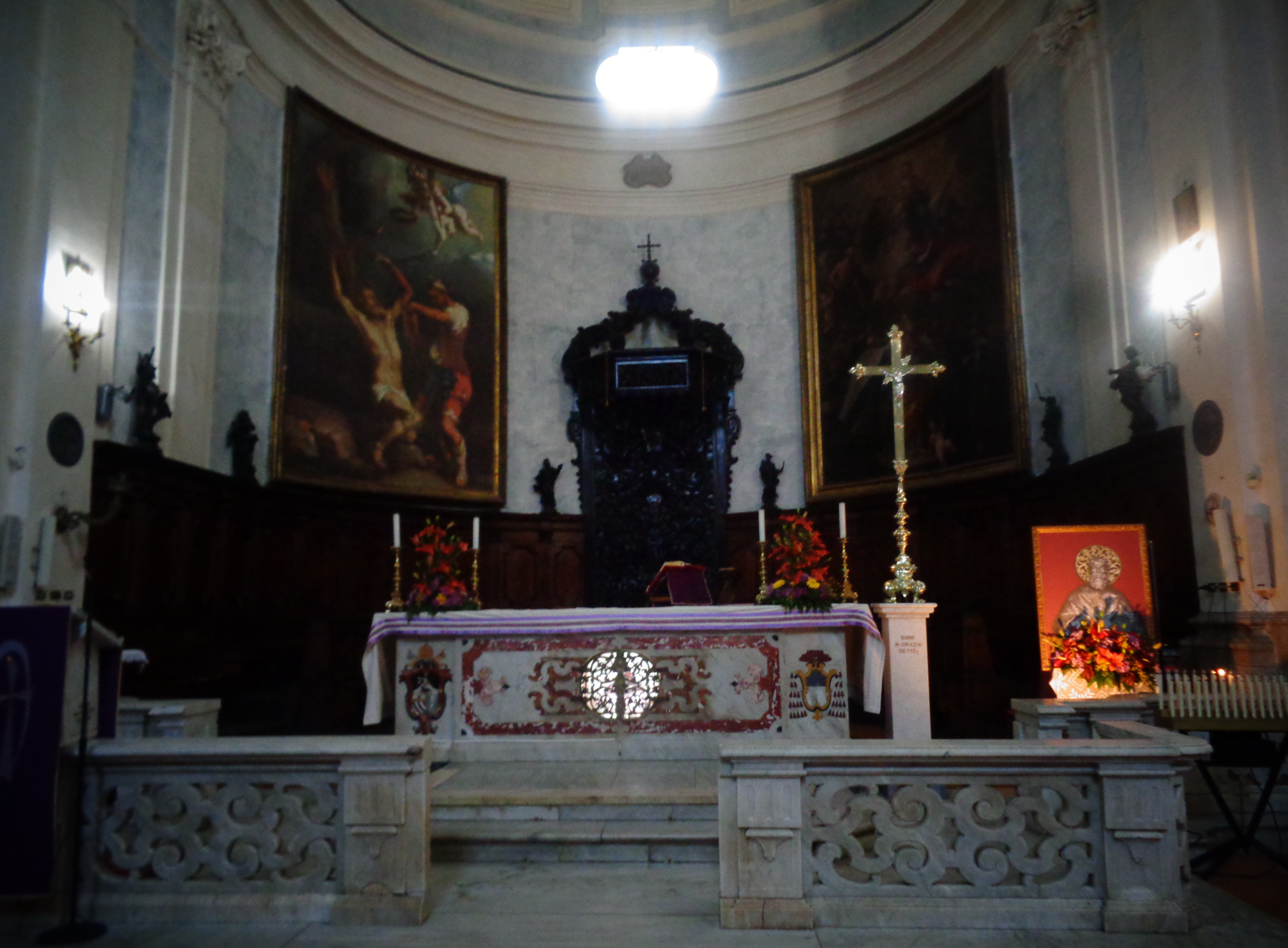
Altar of San Bartolomeo Basilica in Benevento, Italy, containing the relics of Bartholomew

The 6th-century writer Theodorus Lector asserted that in about 507, the Byzantine emperor Anastasius I Dicorus gave the body of Bartholomew to the city of Daras, in Mesopotamia, which he had recently refounded. The existence of relics at Lipari, a small island off the coast of Sicily, in the part of Italy controlled from Constantinople, was explained by Gregory of Tours by his body having miraculously washed up there. A large piece of his skin and many bones that were kept in the Cathedral of St. Bartholomew in Lipari, were translated to Benevento in 838, where they are still kept in the Basilica San Bartolomeo. A portion of the relics was given in 983 by Otto II, Holy Roman Emperor, to Rome, where it is conserved at San Bartolomeo all'Isola, which was founded on the site of the temple of Asclepius, in pagan times an important Roman medical centre. This association with medicine caused Bartholomew's name to become associated in course of time with hospitals.

Saint Bartholomew has been credited with several miracles.

== Art and literature ==
In artistic depictions, Bartholomew is most commonly depicted holding his flayed skin and the knife with which he was skinned. Of this a well known example is featured in Michelangelo's Last Judgement.

Not rarely, Bartholomew is shown draping his own skin around his body. Moreover, representations of Bartholomew with a chained demon are common in Spanish painting.

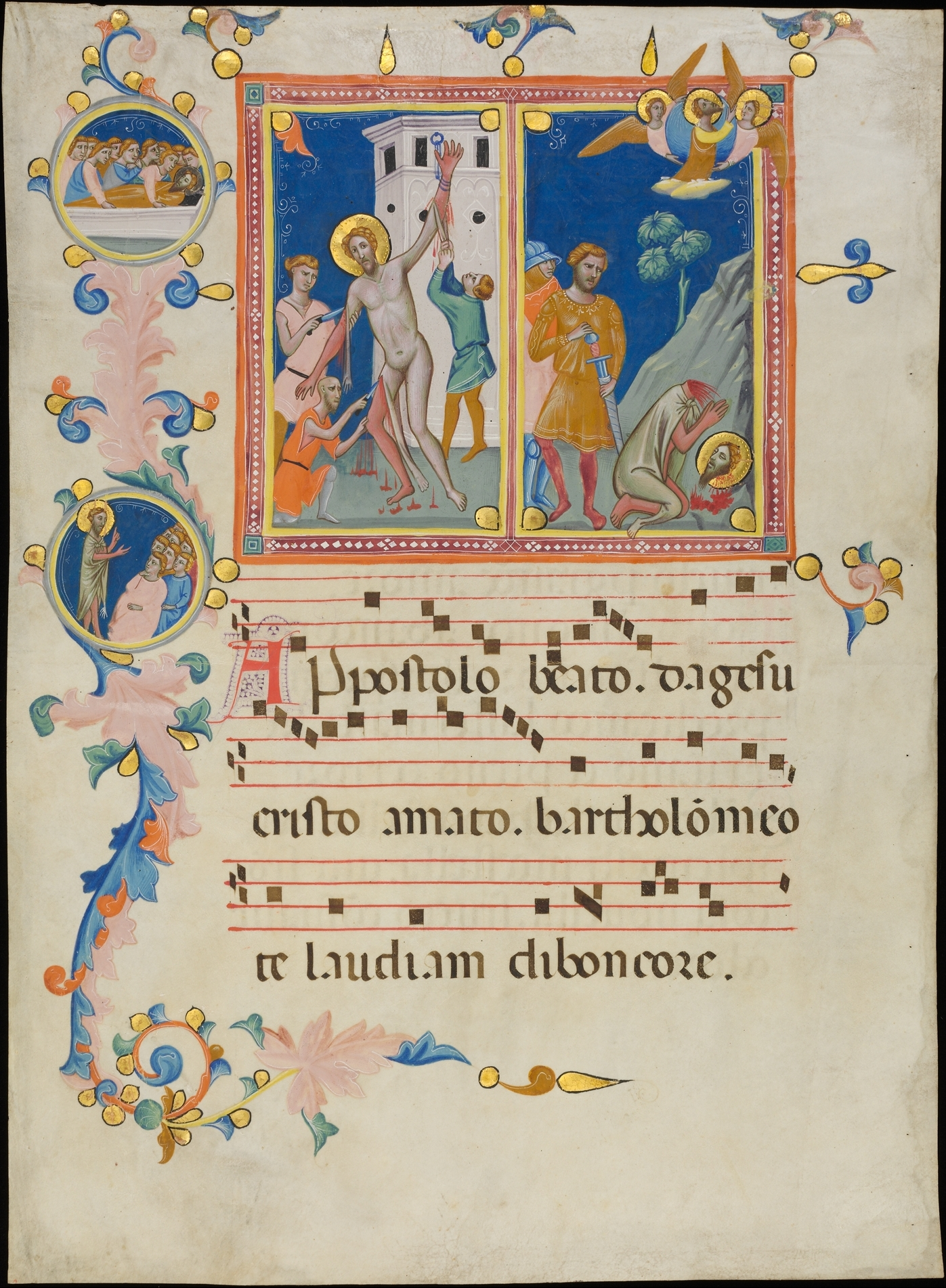
Manuscript Leaf with the Martyrdom of Saint Bartholomew, from a Laudario, Italian, Pacino di Bonaguida (MET, 2006.250)

St. Bartholomew is the most prominent flayed Christian martyr; During the 16th century, images of the flaying of Bartholomew were popular and this detail came to become a virtual constant of iconography. An echo of concentration on these details is found in medieval heraldry regarding Bartholomew, which depicts "flaying knives with silver blades and gold handles, on a red field."

Saint Bartholomew is often depicted in lavish medieval manuscripts. Bearing in mind that manuscripts are in fact made from flayed and manipulated skin, they hold a strong visual and cognitive association with the saint during the medieval period.

Florentine artist Pacino di Bonaguida, depicts his martyrdom in a complex and striking composition in his Laudario of Sant'Agnese, a book of Italian Hymns produced for the Compagnia di Sant'Agnese c. 1340. In the five-scene, narrative-based image, three torturers flay Bartholomew's legs and arms as he is immobilised and chained to a gate. On the right, the saint wears his own skin tied around his neck while he kneels in prayer before a rock, his severed head lying on the ground.

A further depiction is that of the Flaying of St. Bartholomew in the Luttrell Psalter c. 1325–1340. There, Bartholomew is depicted lying on a surgical table, surrounded by tormentors while he is flayed with golden knives.

Due to the nature of his martyrdom, Bartholomew is the patron saint of tanners, plasterers, tailors, leatherworkers, bookbinders, farmers, housepainters, butchers, and glove makers. In works of art the saint has been depicted being skinned by tanners, as in Guido da Siena's reliquary shutters with the Martyrdoms of St. Francis, St. Claire, St. Bartholomew, and St. Catherine of Alexandria. Popular in Florence and other areas in Tuscany, the saint also came to be associated with salt, oil, and cheese merchants.

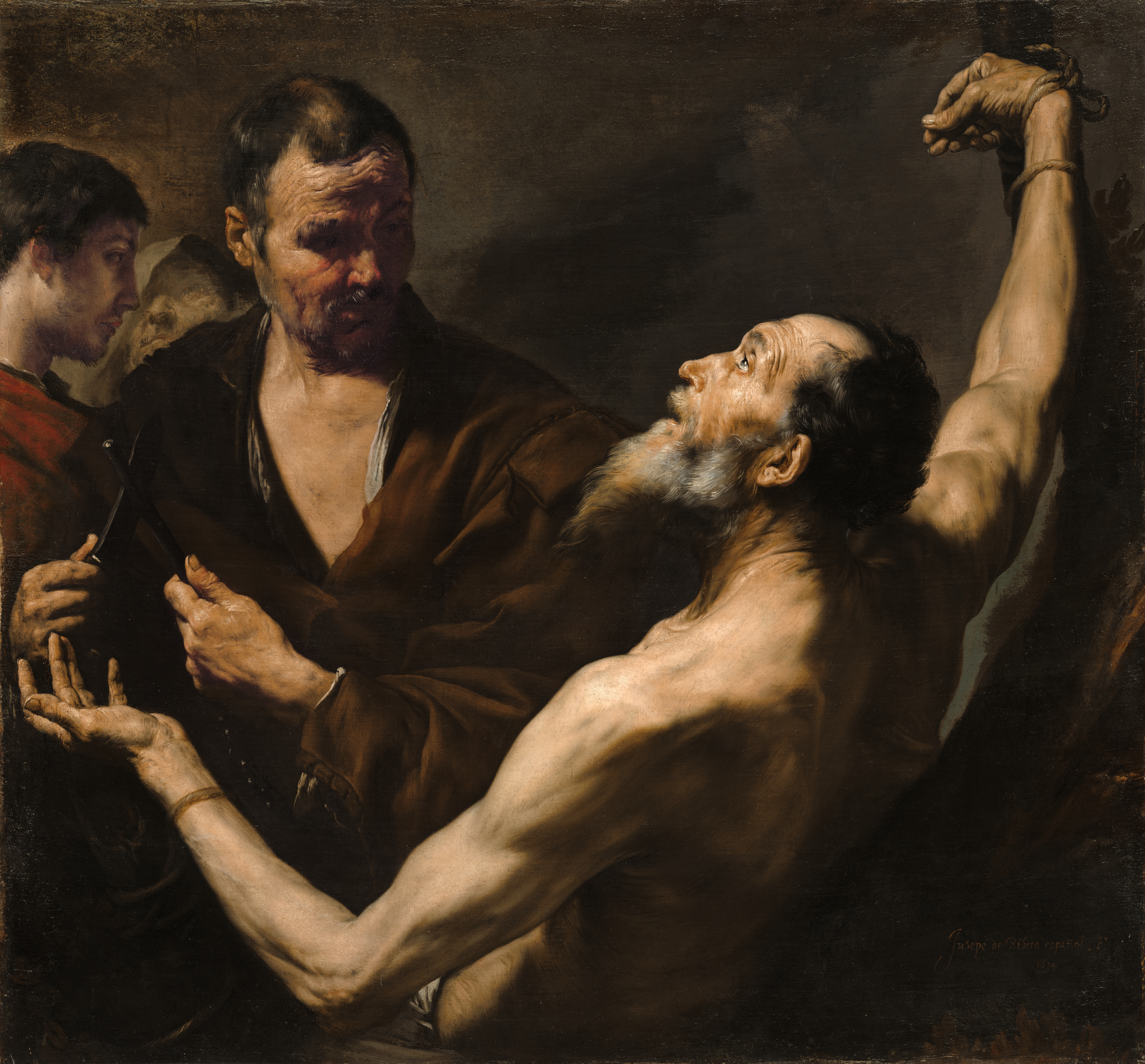
The Martyrdom of Saint Bartholomew by Jusepe de Ribera (1634)

The Martyrdom of Saint Bartholomew (1634) by Jusepe de Ribera depicts Bartholomew's final moments before being flayed alive. Transfixed by Bartholomew's active faith, the executioner seems to have stopped short in his actions, and his furrowed brow and partially illuminated face suggest a moment of doubt, with the possibility of conversion. The cusping along all four edges shows that the painting has not been cut down: Ribera intended the composition to be just such a tight, restricted presentation, with the figures cut off and pressed together.

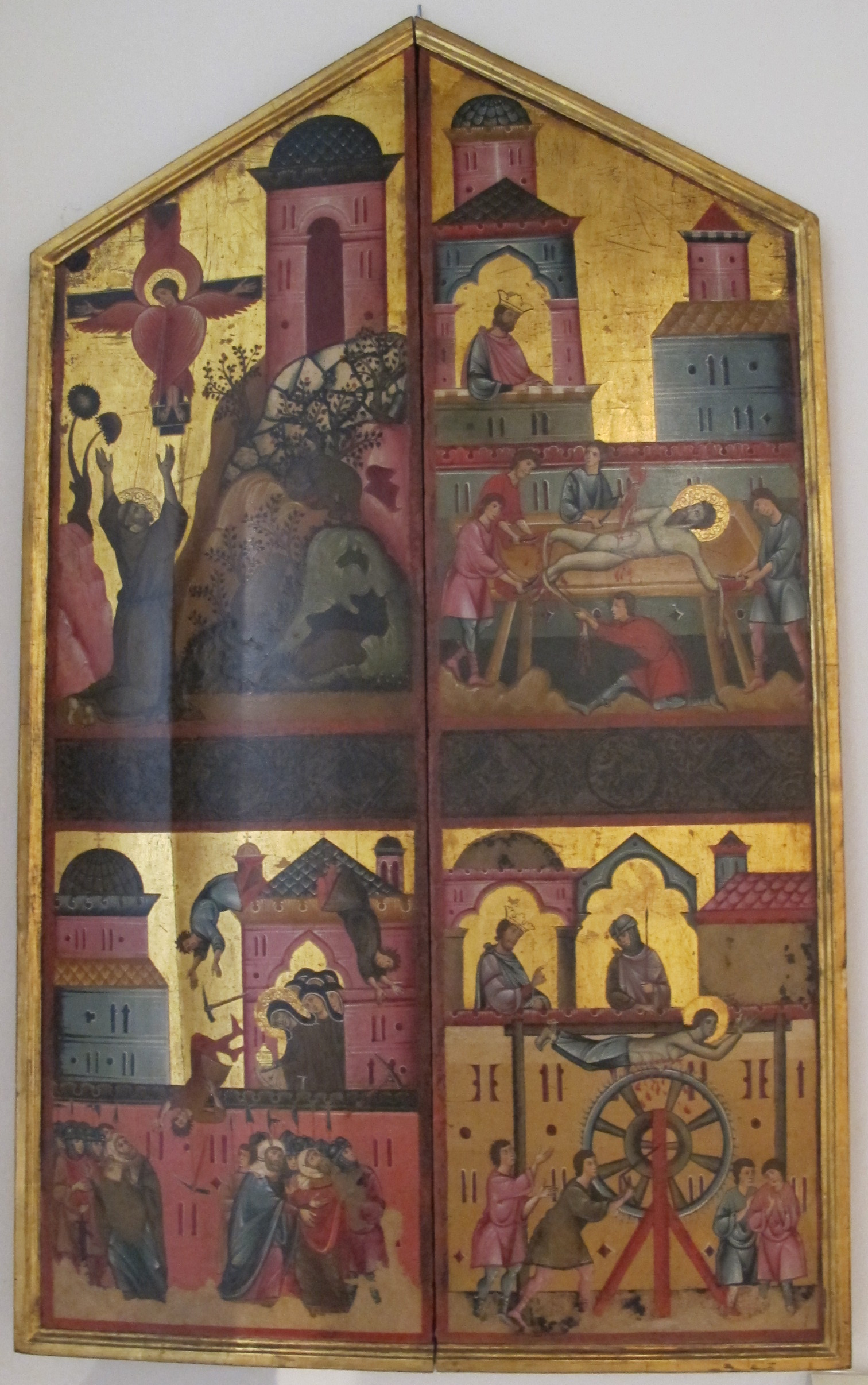
Reliquary shutters with the Martyrdoms of St. Francis, St. Claire, St. Bartholomew, and St. Catherine of Alexandria by Guido da Siena

Although Bartholomew's death is commonly depicted in artworks of a religious nature, his story has also been used to represent anatomical depictions of the human body devoid of flesh. An example of this can be seen in Marco d'Agrate's St Bartholomew Flayed (1562) where Bartholomew is depicted wrapped in his own skin with every muscle, vein and tendon clearly visible, acting as a clear description of the muscles and structure of the human body.

This idea has influenced some contemporary artists to create an artwork depicting an anatomical study of a human body is found amongst with Gunther Von Hagens's The Skin Man (2002) and Damien Hirst's Exquisite Pain (2006). Within Gunther Von Hagens's body of work called Body Worlds a figure reminiscent of Bartholomew holds up his skin. This figure is depicted in actual human tissues (made possible by Hagens's plastination process) to educate the public about the inner workings of the human body and to show the effects of healthy and unhealthy lifestyles. In Exquisite Pain 2006, Damien Hirst depicts St Bartholomew with a high level of anatomical detail with his flayed skin draped over his right arm, a scalpel in one hand and a pair of scissors in the other. The inclusion of scissors was inspired by Tim Burton's film Edward Scissorhands (1990).

Bartholomew plays a part in Francis Bacon's Utopian tale New Atlantis, about a mythical isolated land, Bensalem, populated by a people dedicated to reason and natural philosophy. Some twenty years after the ascension of Christ the people of Bensalem find an ark floating off their shore. The ark contains a letter as well as the books of the Old and New Testaments. The letter is from Bartholomew the Apostle and declares that an angel told him to set the ark and its contents afloat. Thus the scientists of Bensalem receive the revelation of the Word of God.

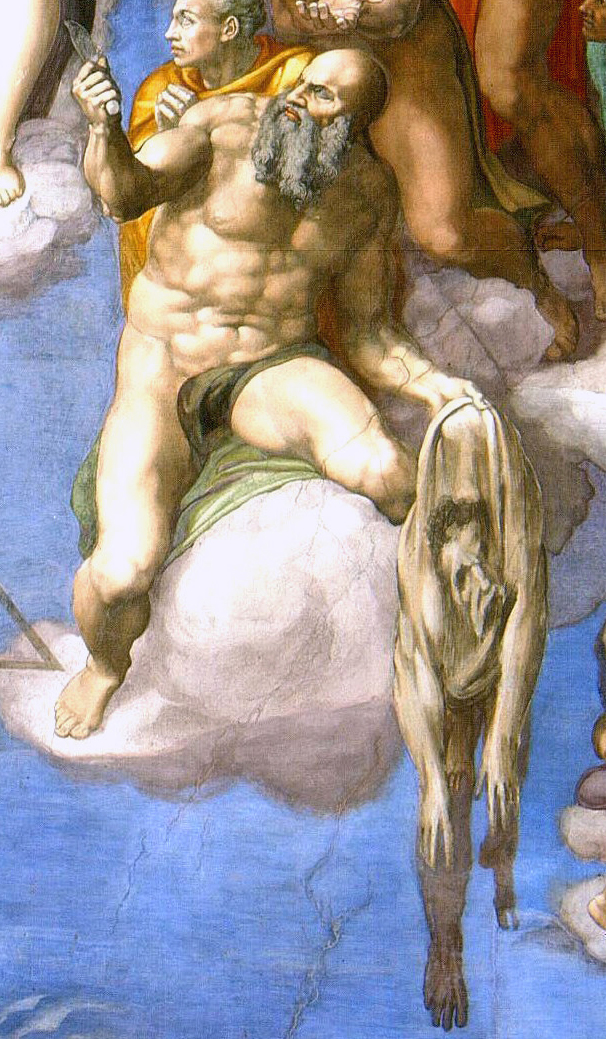
Michelangelo's Sistine Chapel depiction

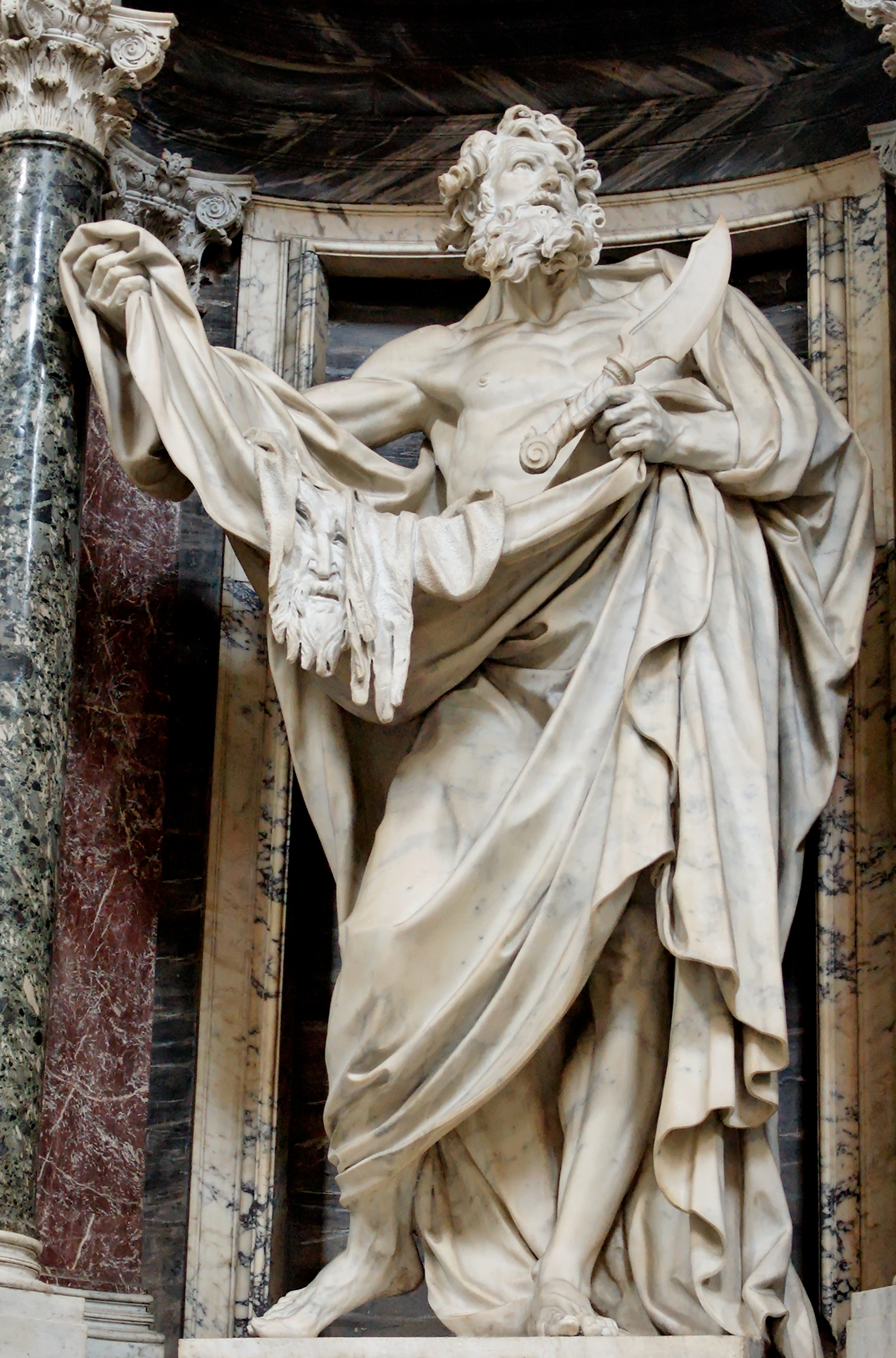
Statue of Bartholomew at the Archbasilica of St. John Lateran by Pierre Le Gros the Younger

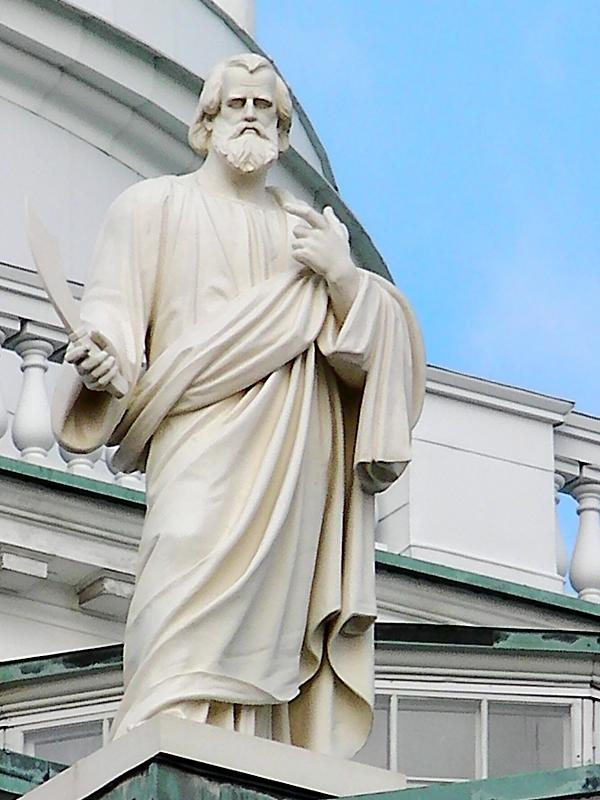
Statue of Saint Bartholomew by August Wredow at the roof of the Helsinki Cathedral

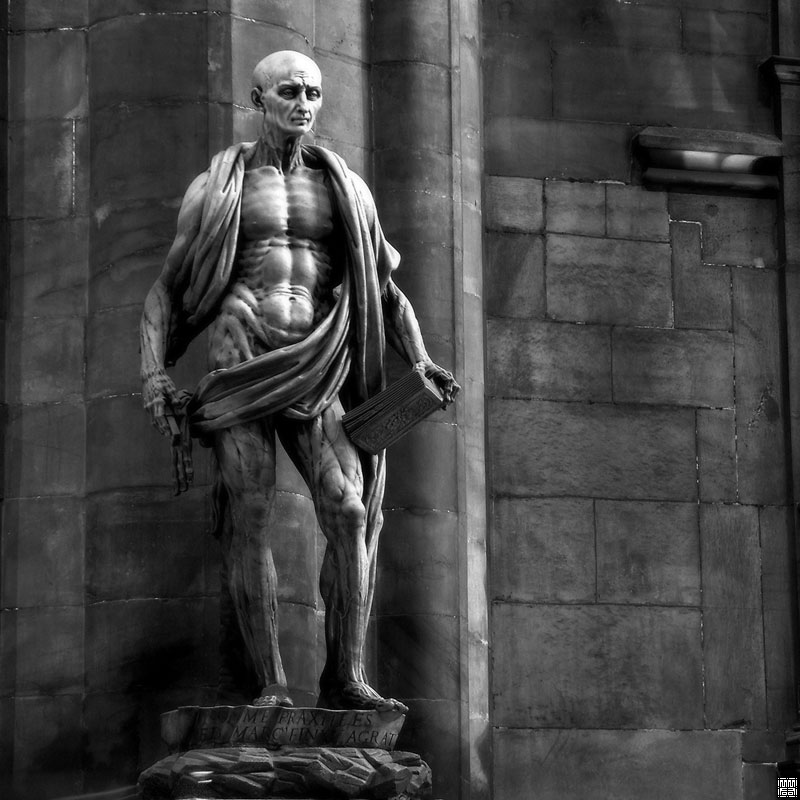
St Bartholomew Flayed, by Marco d'Agrate, 1562 (Duomo di Milano)

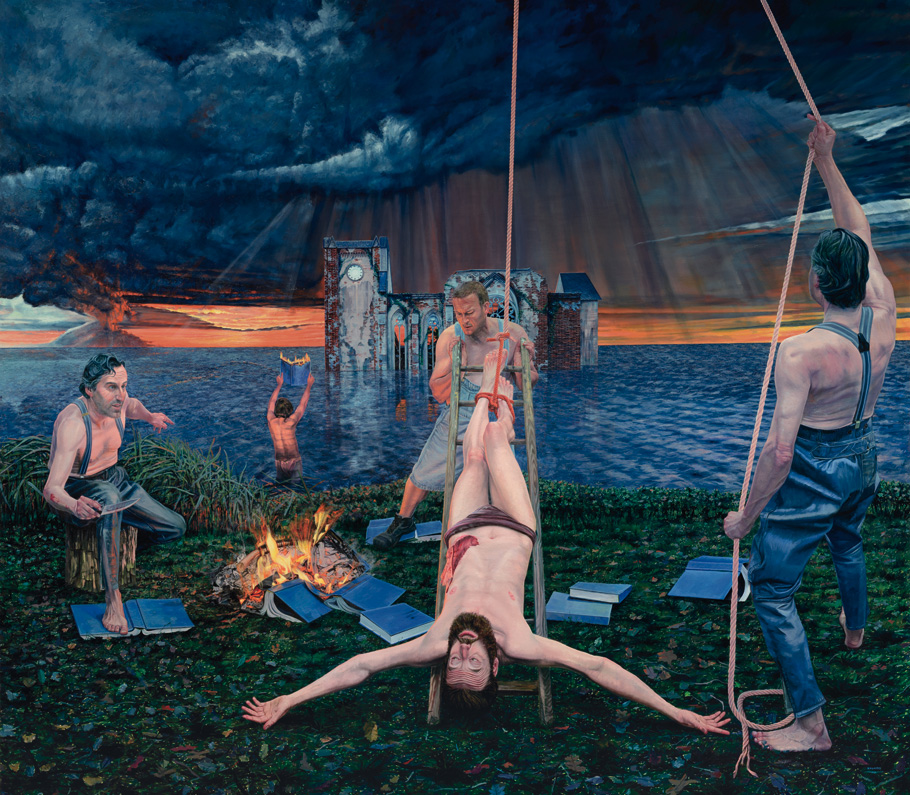
The Martyrdom of St. Bartholomew or the Double Martydom Aris Kalaizis, 2015

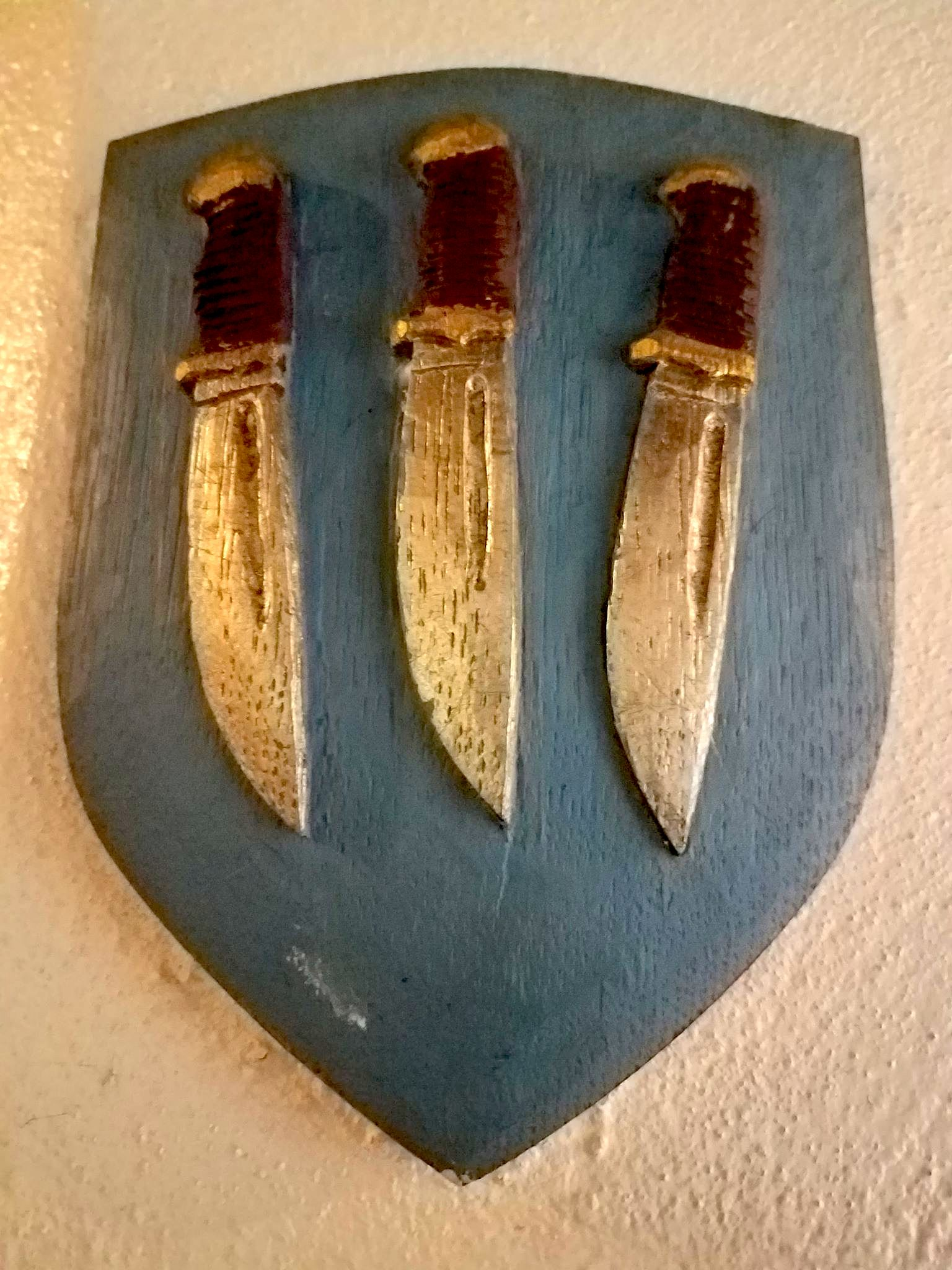
Shield showing three flaying knives, symbol of St. Bartholomew, at the Church of the Good Shepherd (Rosemont, Pennsylvania)

St. Bartholomew pictured in the coat of arms of Pertteli

== Culture ==
The festival in August has been a traditional occasion for markets and fairs, such as the Bartholomew Fair which was held in Smithfield, London, from the Middle Ages, and which served as the scene for Ben Jonson's 1614 homonymous comedy.

St Bartholomew's Street Fair is held in Crewkerne, Somerset, annually at the start of September. The fair dates back to Saxon times and the major traders' market was recorded in the Domesday Book. St Bartholomew's Street Fair, Crewkerne is reputed to have been granted its charter in the time of Henry III (1207–1272). The earliest surviving court record was made in 1280, which can be found in the British Library.

== In Islam ==
The Qur'anic account of the disciples of Jesus does not include their names, numbers, or any detailed accounts of their lives. Muslim exegesis, however, more or less agrees with the New Testament list and holds that the disciples included Peter, Philip, Thomas, Bartholomew, Matthew, Andrew, James, Jude, James the Less, John and Simon the Zealot.

Quoting Ibn Ishaq, the Andalusian scholar al-Qurtubi gives the following details concerning the mission of the disciples of Jesus Christ: He sent Peter and Paul to the Roman lands; Andrew and Matthew to Cannibals; Thomas to Babylon; Philip to Africa; John to Damascus the town of the seven-sleeper; Jacob to Jerusalem; Ibn Talma (Bartholomew) to the Arab world; Simon to the Berbers; Yehuda and Bard to Alexandria. Allah aided them with points of right argument and they prevailed.

== See also ==
- Gospel of Bartholomew
- Questions of Bartholomew
- Acts of Andrew and Bartholomew
- Feast of Saint Bartholomew
- St. Bartholomew's Day massacre
- St Bartholomew's Hospital
- Bertil
- Saint Bartholomew the Apostle, patron saint archive
- Wayzgoose
