= The Martyrdom of Saint Bartholomew (Ribera, 1630–1640) =

Painting by José de Ribera

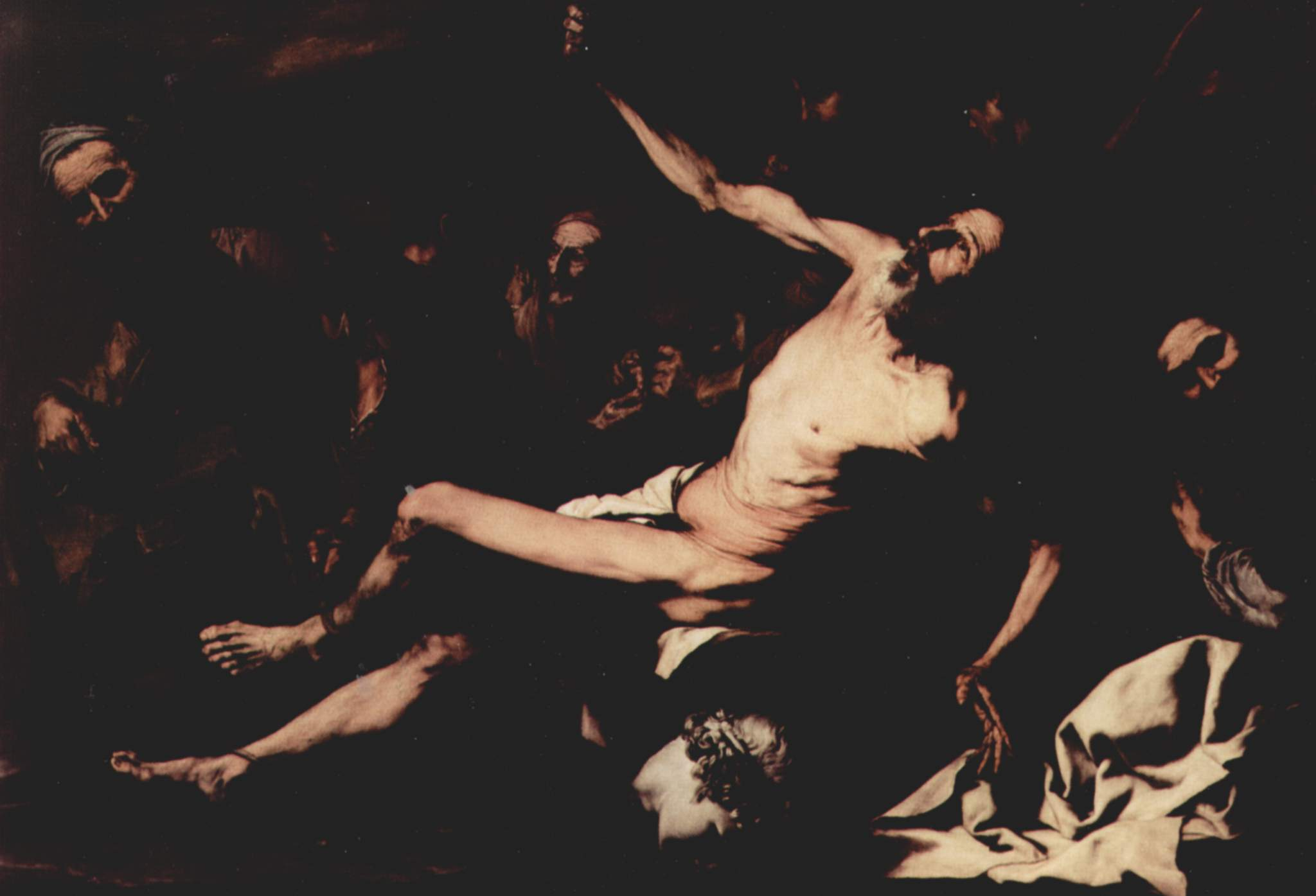
The Martyrdom of Saint Bartholomew (c. 1630–1640) by Jusepe de Ribera

The Martyrdom of Saint Bartholomew is a painting by the Naples-based Spanish artist Jusepe de Ribera, produced between 1630 and 1640 and now in the Galleria Palatina of the Uffizi in Florence.

== Sources ==
- http://www.culturaitalia.it/opencms/museid/viewItem.jsp?language=it&id=oai%3Aculturaitalia.it%3Amuseiditalia-work_64167
- https://www.ft.com/content/a56eabba-bc1b-11e8-8274-55b72926558f
