= The Martyrdom of Saint Bartholomew (Tiepolo) =

Painting by Giovanni Battista Tiepolo

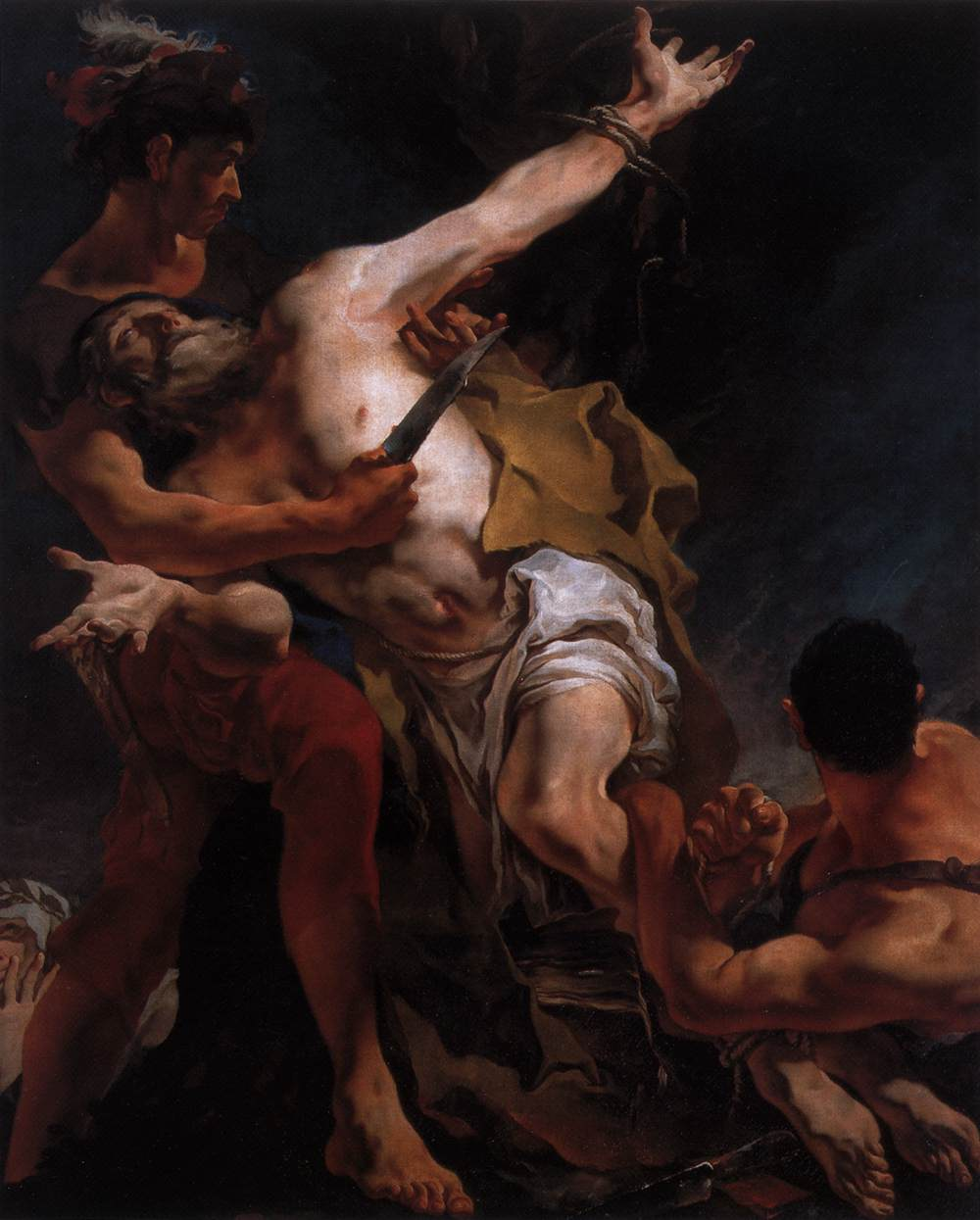
The Martyrdom of Saint Bartholomew (1722)

The Martyrdom of Saint Bartholomew is a 1722 oil-on-canvas painting by the Italian artist Giambattista Tiepolo, produced during the first years he was active in Venice. It still hangs in the church of San Stae in the city, for which it was painted.

In his will, the Venetian patrician Andrea Stazzio left a sizeable sum to produce paintings on the lives of the twelve apostles by Tiepolo, Sebastiano Ricci, Giovanni Antonio Pellegrini and other artists, all to be hung in the nave of San Stae, though they were later moved to the chancel. Francisco Goya very probably saw Tiepolo's work during his trip to Italy in 1771 – Tiepolo worked in Madrid for a time and Goya certainly knew and appreciated his work. Glendinning argues that the work's violence was an influence on Goya's The Third of May 1808.

== Description ==
The painting is characterized by a particularly dark coloration and, although it belongs to Tiepolo's early period, there is a great realism of the figures. The moment in which Saint Bartholomew is about to be skinned is described. The composition is dominated by a diagonal that highlights the body of the saint with respect to those of his executioners; in this way Tiepolo emphasizes the drama of the event. The vehemence with which the apostle directs his arms towards heaven is an allusion to God, represented by the beam of light coming from above.
