= The Martyrdom of Saint Bartholomew (Ribera, 1634) =

Painting by Jusepe de Ribera

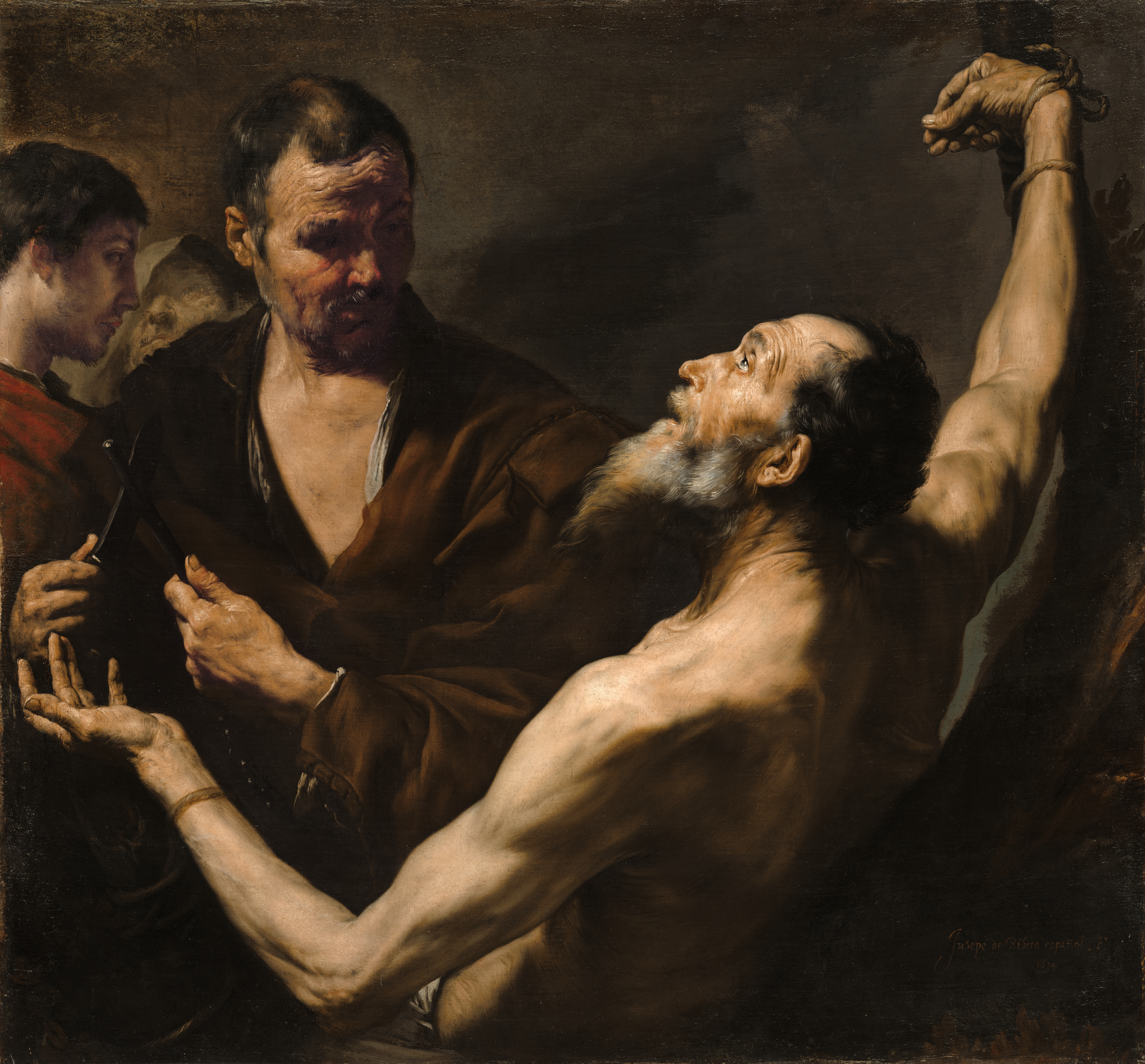
- Artist: Jusepe de Ribera
- Year: 1634
- Medium: oil paint, canvas
- Dimensions: 104 cm (41 in) × 113 cm (44 in)
- Location: National Gallery of Art
- Accession: 1990.137.1

The Martyrdom of Saint Bartholomew is a 1634 painting by Jusepe de Ribera.

== History ==
Nothing is known of its provenance before its purchase around 1810 by Richard Barré Dunning, Lord Ashburton to give to George Cranstoun, Lord Corehouse, his uncle-in-law. It passed down through the Cranstoun family until being sold at Sotheby's in 1983. It was then sold from another private collection in 1990 to the National Gallery of Art in Washington, where it now hangs.
