= Baldachin from Tost =

c. 1220 painted baldachin

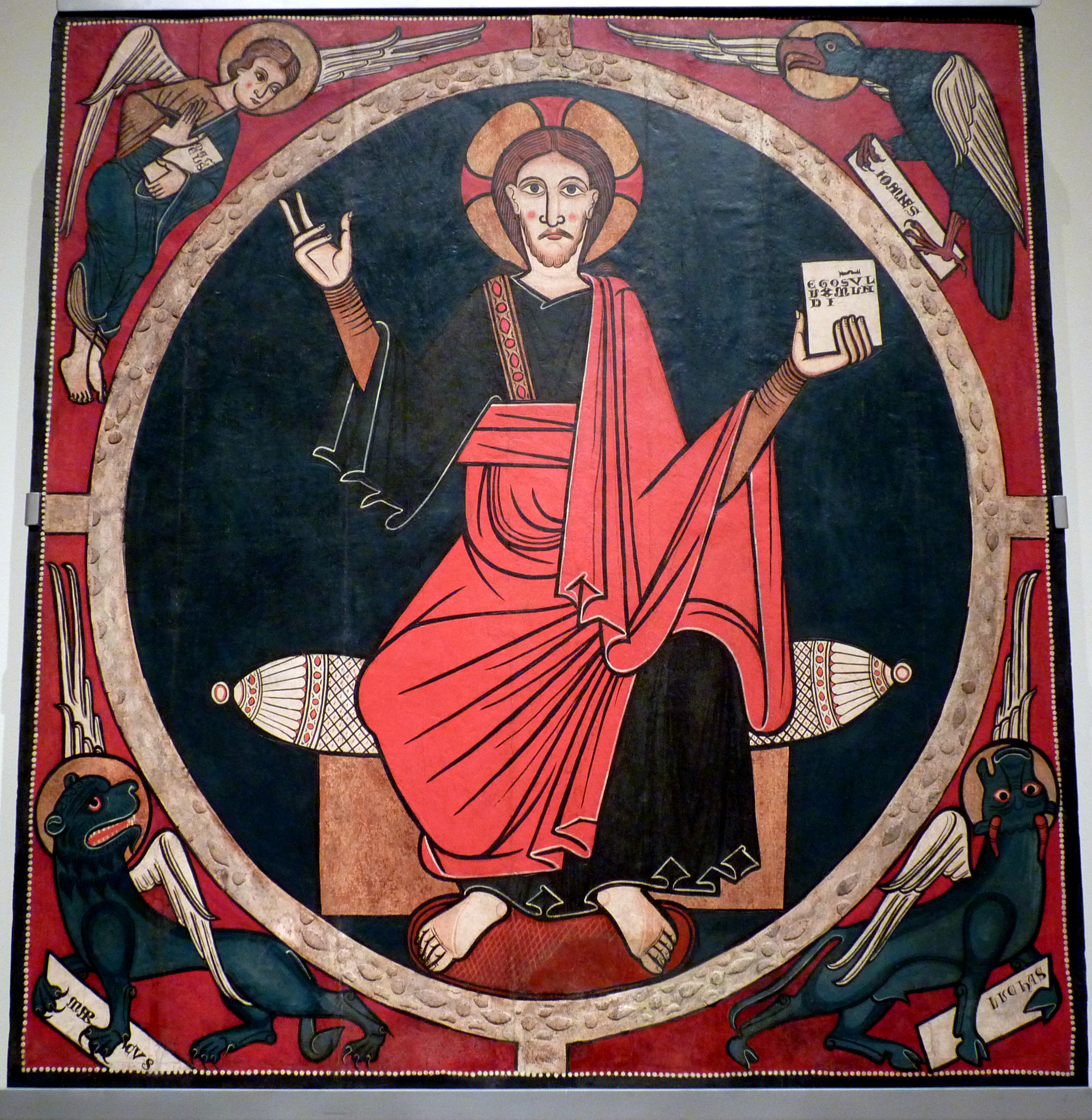
- Artist: Anonymous
- Year: c. 1220
- Type: Tempera, stucco reliefs and remains of varnished metal plate on wood
- Dimensions: 176.5 cm × 161 cm (69.5 in × 63 in)
- Location: Museu Nacional d'Art de Catalunya, Barcelona

The Baldachin from Tost is a painted baldachin exhibited at the National Art Museum of Catalonia in Barcelona.

== Description ==
The panel of the Baldachin from Tost, which covered the altar to give it more importance, corresponds to the type of liturgical furnishing that was attached by beams to the apse wall.

Another type of Romanesque Baldaccin is the one that has the form of a shrine, which could also be of wood, like the one from Toses, or else stone, like the one that used to be at the monastery of Ripoll and of which the finely carved bases have been preserved.

The Tost panel has a representation of the Lord in Majesty, with a crucifer halo and enthroned in the mandorla, which at one time must have been golden, with the book in his left hand with a Biblical citation, EGO SVM LUX MVNDI, which proclaims him as the light of the world. With his right hand, he makes the sign of blessing.

Around him are the four symbols of the Evangelists or the Tetramorph, each of which, instead of the book of the Gospel of earlier examples, has a sign or phylactery with his name. On John’s eagle and Luke’s bull can be observed, in particular, the subordination of the figure to its frame—that is, to the available space, even when this involves strange or unnatural distortion of the forms. Here, the way the configuration of these two symbols is dealt with is especially noteworthy. In addition, the pictorial style shows some figurative features of a more naturalistic type, such as the figure and face of Matthew’s angel, which comes closer to the new spirit of Gothic. This convergence of the resources of two pictorial languages shows the artistic influences and tensions of a time of change. As regards the colours, recent restoration has made it possible to recover the original very bright blue and red.
