= The Christ from 1147 =

Medieval Catalan wooden crucifix

- Artist: Unknown
- Medium: sculpture in wood with traces of polychrome
- Dimensions: 118 cm × 118 cm (46 in × 46 in)
- Location: Museu Nacional d'Art de Catalunya; Barcelona

The Christ from 1147 is a Catalan wood sculpture from the 12th-century, exhibited at the National Art Museum of Catalonia in Barcelona.

== Description ==
Within the Romanesque sculpture on wood carving of Catalonia, this is an exceptional item as it can be precisely dated, something that only happens in two other works.

In a restoration undertaken in 1952, a cavity was discovered behind the figure of Christ which contained various relics wrapped in Hispano-Muslim fabrics and some parchments. One of these parchments contained an inscription stating the work was consecrated in 1147, from which the sculpture takes its name. Another parchment mentioned the acknowledgement of the relics in 1521, which shows that the item was still in use after the Middle Ages and that it was remodelled at that time. The piece is valuable since it can be used to date similar works, and it also reminds us that some carvings were also used as reliquaries.

Unlike the Maiestàs (or Christ triumphant), The Christ from 1147 is an example of the Suffering Christ (Christus Patiens), depicted half naked, dressed only in a short loincloth, or perizonium, and with his arms noticeably bent. Although it is a reference to the redemptive death of Christ, it dwells more on the aspect of suffering, on the death of Christ the man. The hard facial features help to stress this aspect, as does the treatment of the anatomy. Nevertheless, we must bear in mind that the work has lost practically all its polychrome, so that its present appearance is very different from the original. The Catalan region has numerous examples of this typology, and of Romanesque in general. Amongst the main precedents is the Christ from Gero, kept in Cologne and dated between 960 and 980.
