= Lucha Occitana =

Lucha Occitana Occitan Struggle
- Founded: 1971
- Dissolved: 1974
- Newspaper: Païs Occitan-Lucha Occitana and Occitània Passat e Present
- Ideology: Revolutionary Socialism; Occitan nationalism Left-wing nationalism Autonomism; Anti-imperialism

Occitan Struggle (Occitan: Lucha Occitana, LO) was an Occitan political group created in 1971 from the Comitat Occitans d'Estudis e d'Accion. It was mainly composed of intellectuals, students and agricultural unionists. The group had a revolutionary, autonomist, and Occitan nationalist ideology, and was headquartered in Toulouse. The group primarily desired the complete decolonization of Occitania, and appealed to the Occitan working class, which they thought would contribute to the destruction of the capitalist French state. In 1972, LO signed the Brest Charter.

Lucha Occitana published the newspapers Païs Occitan-Lucha Occitana in Toulouse and Occitània Passat e Present in Antibes. LO conducted an analysis of the Occitan situation. They opposed the separatist views of the Occitan Nationalist Party. Instead, their core beliefs were:

- The existence of an Occitan identity that was culturally and linguistically different from that of the French identity. The group was resistant to French cultural hegemony and acculturation.
- Capitalist and colonial exploitation was present in Occitania, pursuing the liquidation of the Occitan national minority.
- The French state increasingly oppresses the Occitan lower classes.
- The class struggle in Occitania reflects greater aspirations than those of the rest of the French hexagon.

LO never had more than 500 militants. The group gained prominence thanks to demonstrations against the expropriations of Larzac. In 1974 Lucha Occitana underwent an internal crisis and fragmented into numerous factions.
