= Aranese (disambiguation) =

Aranese is a language spoken in Spain.

Aranese may also refer to:

- Arenes stream, river that travels 15km through Spain
- Aranese Democratic Convergence, political party
- Juan Arañés (died c. 1649), Spanish baroque composer

== Elections ==
- 2007 Aranese Council election, a General Council of Aran election
- 2011 Aranese Council election, a General Council of Aran election
- 2015 Aranese Council election, a General Council of Aran election
- 2019 Aranese Council election, a General Council of Aran election
- 2023 Aranese Council election, a General Council of Aran election

== See also ==
- Arenas (disambiguation)
- Aranea (disambiguation)
