= Mireia Boya Busquet =

Spanish politician and environmental scientist

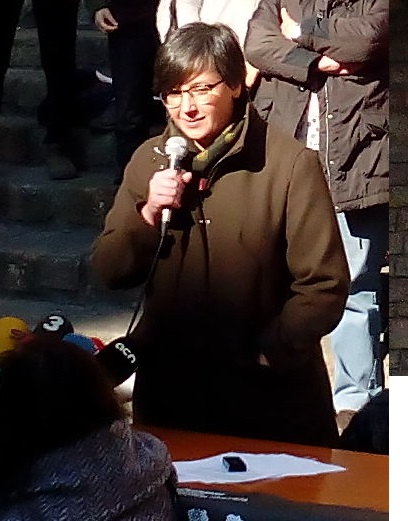

Member of the Parliament of Catalonia
- In office 19 January 2016 – 28 October 2017
- Constituency: Province of Lleida

Personal details
- Born: 1979 (age 46–47) Saint-Gaudens, France
- Citizenship: Spanish
- Party: Corròp
- Parents: Ernesto Boya (father); Maria Pilar Busquets (mother)
- Relatives: Jusèp Boya Busquet (brother)
- Education: Université de Montréal
- Occupation: Professor, environmental scientist, politician
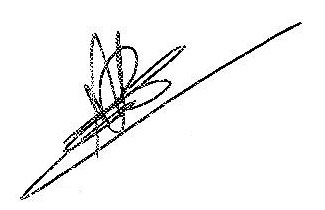
- Signature

Mireia Boya Busquet (born 1979) is a Catalan scientist, activist, and politician from Spain. She is a councilor of the Aran municipality of Les. Since February 2018 she has been part of the national secretariat of the Popular Unity Candidacy (CUP). She was a member of the Catalan Parliament from 2016 to 2017.

== Biography ==
The daughter of Ernesto Boya and the politician Maria Pilar Busquets, she has a degree in Environmental Sciences from the Autonomous University of Barcelona (2002), a master's degree in Landscape Design (2004), and a PhD in Land Management and Planning (2009) from the Université de Montréal. In the professional field, she is a consultant and adjunct lecturer ("asociada") of the Humanities Department of Pompeu Fabra University.

Mireia Boya Busquet has been a fighter for the recognition of Occitan identity of the Valley of Aran, and was the first member of the Catalan Parliament to use the Aranese dialect in the Parliament of Catalonia. Her brother, Jusèp Boya Busquet, has been general director of Archives, Libraries, Museum, and Heritage of the Generalitat beginning in January 2016, an office that he was dismissed from after the 2017 suspension of Catalonian self-government.

== Political career ==
Boya is a founder and former coordinator of the Assemblea Nacional Catalana in Val d'Aran and councilor in the city of Les for the Corròp party, framed in Occitan nationalism. In the 2015 elections to the Parliament of Catalonia, she was a candidate of the CUP for the district of Lleida, after a vote in primaries. Boya, who was second in the list in her constituency, was not elected, but on 18 December 2015, during the tense negotiations between the CUP and the pro-independence coalition Junts pel Sí, the CUP's number one, Ramon Usall, resigned for personal reasons. In this way, Boya occupied the post of regional parliamentarian. She participated in the plenary sessions of the Parliament that voted for the roadmap to independence for Catalonia, and voted the Unilateral declaration of Independence of Catalonia.

In the elections of 21 December 2017, of the 5,265 votes cast in Val d'Aran, the CUP received 174 – 3.3% of the total.

In February 2018, she was elected a member of the CUP National Secretariat as an independent candidate with 662 votes.

=== Occitan nationalism ===
A defender of the Occitan nation, Boya upholds a "project of a country with two languages of its own", a country that looks "to the north, to Occitania".

== Judicial case ==
On 22 December 2017, Judge Pablo Llarena of the Supreme Court of Spain agreed on the inquiry (previously charged) for rebellion against Mireia Boya (president of the CUP's parliamentary group), Artur Mas (president of the PDeCat), Marta Rovira (secretary general of the ERC), Anna Gabriel (spokesperson of the CUP), Marta Pascal (general coordinator of the CUP), and Neus Lloveras (president of the AMI), all for belonging to the organizing team of the Catalan independence referendum held on 1 October 2017 and with a decisive role in the secessionist plan, whose roadmap was annulled by the Spanish Constitutional Court. Boya was declared as investigated on 14 February 2018, being released without precautionary measures.
