= 2023 Aranese Council election =

← 2019	28 May 2023

All 13 seats in the Conselh Generau d'Aran 7 seats needed for a majority
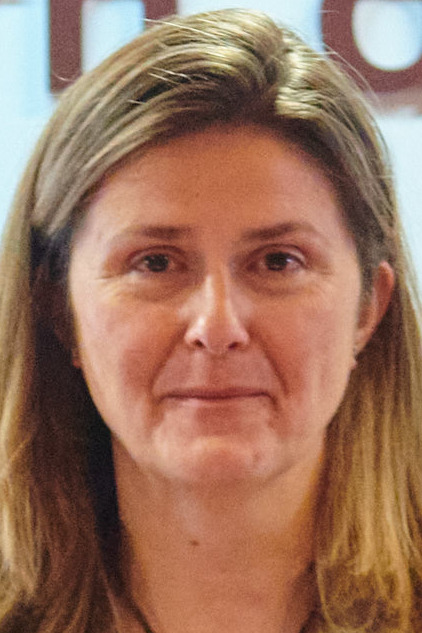

	First party	Second party
Leader	Maria Vergés Pérez	Ròsa Maria Salgueiro
Party	UA–PSC	CDA–PNA
Leader's seat	Castièro	Castièro
Last election	9 seats, 49.7%	4 seats, 30.0%
Seats won	9	4
Seat change	0	0
Popular vote	2,279	1,626
Percentage	49.1%	35.0%
Swing	0.6 pp	5.0 pp
Síndic d'Aran before election
Maria Vergés Pérez
UA–PSC
Elected Síndic d'Aran
Maria Vergés Pérez
UA–PSC

The 2023 Aranese Council Election, was held on Sunday, 28 May 2023, to elect the General Council of Aran, an administrative entity in the province of Lleida (Spain). All 13 seats in the council were up for election. The election was held simultaneously with regional elections in twelve autonomous communities and local elections all throughout Spain.

== Overview ==
=== Electoral system ===
The General Council of Aran is elected every four years on the basis of universal suffrage, which comprises all nationals over eighteen who can vote in the local elections in any of the 9 municipalities that make up Aran. It was officially established after the 1991 elections and is made up of 13 members. According to Law 16/1990, of July 13, on the special regime of the Val d'Aran, it is made up of the Síndic d'Aran, the General Councilors (Occitan: Conselhers Generaus), that work in plenary, and by the Commission of Accounts Auditors (Occitan: Commission d'Auditors de Compdes).

In every election, electors choose the General Councilors, that will later elect the Síndic, who acts as the head of government. Aran is divided in six electoral districts, whose borders coincide with those of the "thirds" (Occitan: Terçon, Catalan: Terçó, Spanish: Tersón), a traditional division of the valley. In every district, members are allocated using the proportional D'Hônt method with closed lists, with an electoral threshold of five percent of the valid votes in every district. The electoral system results in a higher effective threshold depending on the district magnitude and the distribution of votes among candidacies.

On the 2019 election, members were distributed in the following way:

Constituency	Seats
Pujòlo	2
Arties e Garòs	2
Castièro	4
Marcatosa	1
Lairissa	1
Quate Lòcs	3

As Catalonia has not developed its own electoral law, Aranese elections are regulated by Organic Law No. 5 of 19 June 1985, which regulates elections nationwide.

=== Election date ===
The date of the elections is set for the same day that local elections are held in Spain, that is, the fourth Sunday of May every 4 years.

== Parties and candidates ==
The electoral law allowed for parties and federations registered in the interior ministry, coalitions and groupings of electors to present lists of candidates. Parties and federations intending to form a coalition ahead of an election were required to inform the relevant Electoral Commission within ten days of the election call, whereas groupings of electors needed to secure the signature of at least one percent of the electorate in the constituencies for which they sought election, disallowing electors from signing for more than one list of candidates.

Below is a list of the main parties and electoral alliances which contested the election:

Candidacy	Parties and alliances	Leading candidate	Ideology	Previous result		Gov.	Ref.
Candidacy	Parties and alliances	Leading candidate	Ideology	Votes (%)	Seats	Gov.	Ref.
UA–PSC	List: Unity of Aran (UA); Socialists' Party of Catalonia (PSC)	Maria Vergés Pérez	Social democracy Aranese autonomism	49.72%	9	check	
CDA–PNA	List: Aranese Democratic Convergence-Aranese Nationalist Party (CDA–PNA)	Ròsa Maria Salgueiro	Liberalism; Aranese autonomy Occitan nationalism	29.97%	4	☒	
AA–AM	List: Aran Together (Aran Amassa); Republican Left of Catalonia (ERC)	None (Note: Aran Amassa did not unveil the name of its candidate for the post of Síndic d'Aran.)	Socialism; Catalan independence Occitan nationalism	10.86%	0	☒	
PRAG	List: Renewal Party of Arties e Garòs (PRAG)	José Antonio Bruna	Localism; Progressivism; Aranese autonomy	1.91%	0	☒	

== Results ==
=== Overall ===
← Summary of the 28 May 2023 Conselh Generau d'Aran election results
Parties and alliances	Popular vote			Seats	
Parties and alliances	Votes	%	±pp	Total	+/−
Unity of Aran–Socialists' Party of Catalonia (UA–PSC)	2,279	49.05	–0.67	9	±0
Aranese Democratic Convergence-Aranese Nationalist Party (CDA–PNA)	1,626	34.99	+5.03	4	±0
Aran Together–Municipal Agreement (Aran Amassa–AM)	498	10.71	–0.15	0	±0
Renewal Party of Arties e Garòs (PRAG)	91	1.95	+0.05	0	±0
Blank ballots	152	3.27	+1.25		
Total	4,646			13	±0
Valid votes	4,646	97.74	–0,93		
Invalid votes	107	2.25	+0.93		
Votes cast / turnout	4,753	65.02	–7.35		
Abstentions	2,556	34.97	+7.35		
Registered voters	7,309				

Popular vote
UA–PSC	49.05%
CDA–PNA	34.99%
AA–AM	10.71%
PRAG	1.95%
Blank ballots	3.27%

Seats
UA–PSC	69.23%
CDA–PNA	30.76%

=== Distribution by constituency ===
Constituency	UA–PSC		CDA–PNA		AA–AM		PRAG	
Constituency	%	S	%	S	%	S	%	S
Arties e Garòs	27.4	1	38.4	1	8.4	−	23.9	−
Castièro	56.0	3	29.4	1	11.2	−		
Lairissa	59.6	1	35.3	−				
Marcatosa	46.2	1	40.1	−	11.4	−		
Pujòlo	33.2	1	52.4	1	11.5	−		
Quate Lòcs	52.7	2	30.8	1	13.1	−		
Total	49.1	9	35.0	4	10.7	−	2.0	−

== See also ==
- 2023 Spanish local elections
