= 2015 Aranese Council election =

Popular election process

← 2011	24 May 2015	2019 →

All 13 seats in the Conselh Generau d'Aran 7 seats needed for a majority
- Registered: 6,967 4.3%
- Turnout: 4,877 (69.96%); 3.3 pp
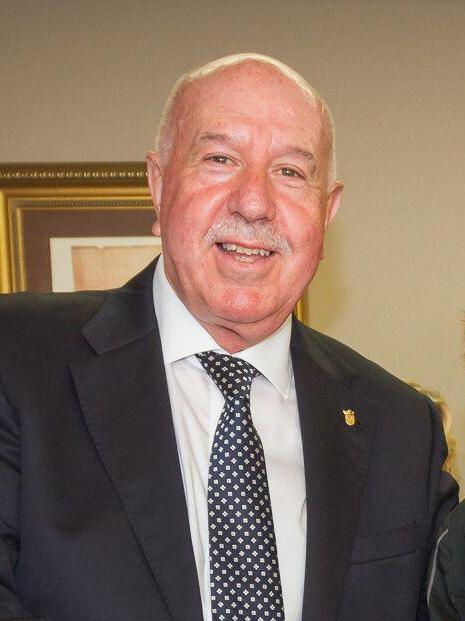

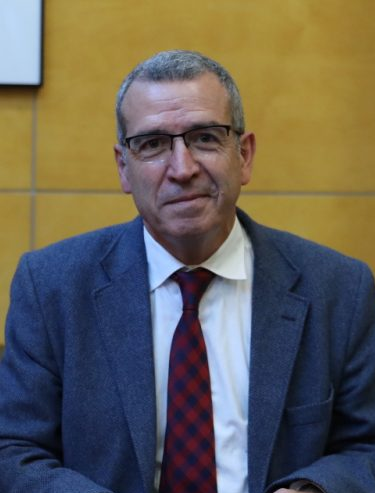

	First party	Second party	Third party
Leader	Carles Barrera	Francés Boya	José Antonio Bruna
Party	CDA-PNA	UA-PSC-CP	PRAG
Leader's seat	Castièro	Quate Lòcs	Arties e Garòs
Last election	7 seats, 46.38%	5 seats, 41.13%	1 seat, 2.70%
Seats won	7	5	1
Seat change	0	0	0
Popular vote	1,972	2,193	130
Percentage	41.06%	45.66%	2.69%
Swing	5.32 pp	4.53 pp	0.01 pp
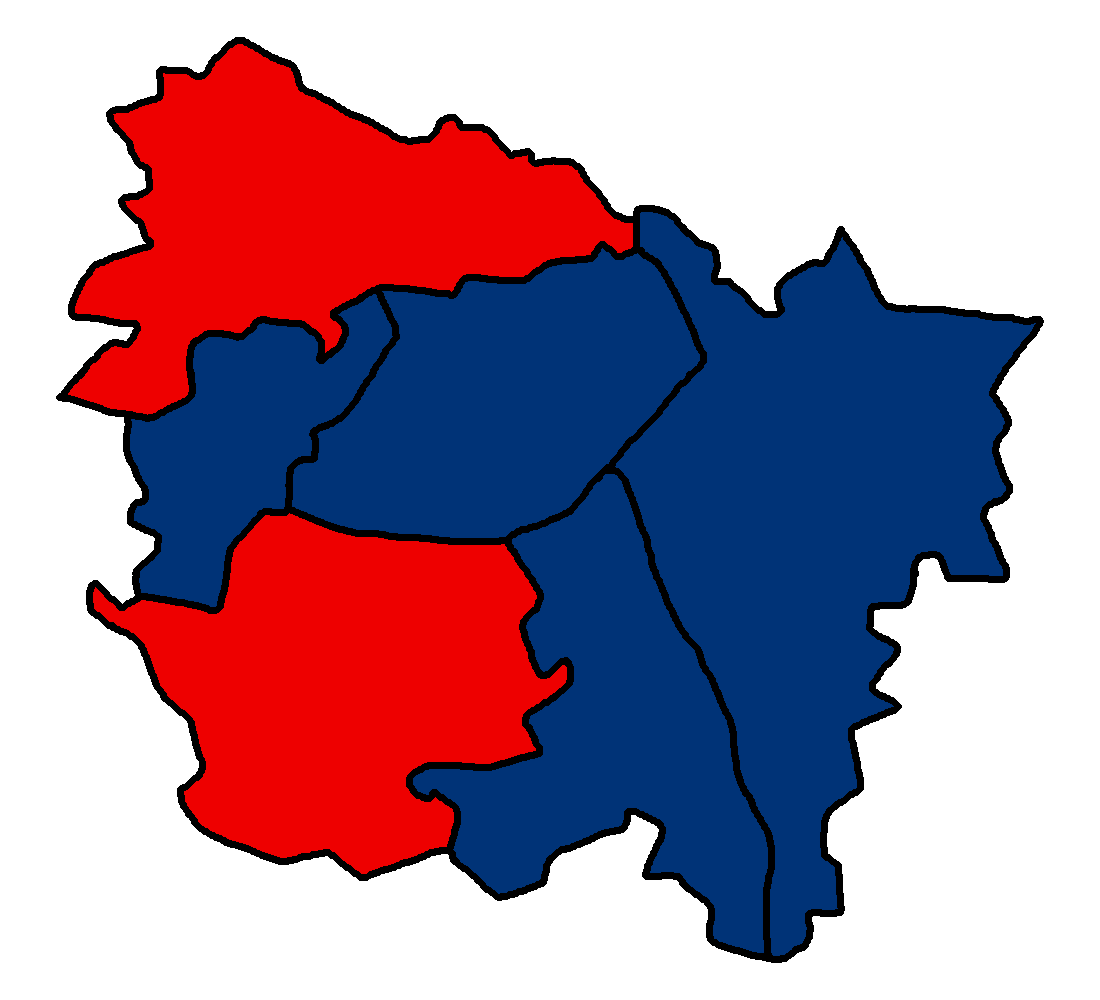
- UA-PSC-CP CDA-PNA; Constituency results map for the Conselh Generau d'Aran
Síndic d'Aran before election
Carlos Barrera
CDA-PNA
Elected Síndic d'Aran
Carlos Barrera
CDA-PNA

The 2015 Aranese Council Election, was held on Sunday, 24 May 2015, to elect the General Council of Aran, an administrative entity in the province of Lleida (Spain). All 13 seats in the council were up for election. The election was held simultaneously with regional elections in twelve autonomous communities and local elections all throughout Spain.

== Overview ==
=== Electoral system ===
The General Council of Aran is elected every four years on the basis of universal suffrage, which comprises all nationals over eighteen who can vote in the local elections in any of the 9 municipalities that make up Aran. It was officially established after the 1991 elections and is made up of 13 members. According to Law 16/1990, of July 13, on the special regime of the Val d'Aran, it is made up of the Síndic of Aran, the General Councilors (Occitan: Conselhers Generaus), that work in plenary, and by the Commission of Accounts Auditors (Occitan: Commission d'Auditors de Compdes).

In every election, electors choose the General Councilors, that will later elect the Síndic, who acts as the head of government. Aran is divided in six electoral districts, whose borders coincide with those of the "thirds" (Occitan: Terçon, Catalan: Terçó, Spanish: Tersón), a traditional division of the valley. In every district, members are allocated using the proportional D'Hônt method with closed lists, with an electoral threshold of five percent of the valid votes in every district.

For the 2015 elections, members were distributed in the following way:

- Pujòlo: 2 members.
- Arties e Garòs: 2 members.
- Castièro: 4 members.
- Marcatosa: 1 member.
- Lairissa: 1 member.
- Quate Lòcs: 3 members.

As Catalonia has not developed its own electoral law, Aranese elections are regulated by Organic Law No. 5 of 19 June 1985, which regulates elections nationwide.

=== Election date ===
The date of the elections is set for the same day that local elections are held in Spain, that is, the fourth Sunday of May every 4 years.

== Parties and candidates ==
The electoral law allowed for parties and federations registered in the interior ministry, coalitions and groupings of electors to present lists of candidates. Parties and federations intending to form a coalition ahead of an election were required to inform the relevant Electoral Commission within ten days of the election call, whereas groupings of electors needed to secure the signature of at least one percent of the electorate in the constituencies for which they sought election, disallowing electors from signing for more than one list of candidates.

Below is a list of the main parties and electoral alliances which contested the election:

Candidacy	Parties and alliances	Leading candidate	Ideology	Previous result		Gov.	Ref.
Candidacy	Parties and alliances	Leading candidate	Ideology	Votes (%)	Seats	Gov.	Ref.
CDA-PNA	List: Aranese Democratic Convergence-Aranese Nationalist Party (CDA-PNA)	Carles Barrera	Liberalism; Aranese autonomy Occitan nationalism	46.38%	7	check	
UA-PSC-CP	List: Unity of Aran (UA); Socialists' Party of Catalonia (PSC); Candidatura de Progrés (CP)	Francés Boya	Social democracy Aranese autonomism	41.13%	5	☒	
PRAG	List: Partit Renovador d'Arties e Garòs (PRAG)	José Antonio Bruna	Localism; Progressivism; Aranese autonomy	2.70%	1	☒	

== Campaign ==
=== Party slogans ===
Party or alliance	Original slogan	English translation	Ref.
CDA-PNA	« Aran, èm era fòrça, èm país »	"Aran, we are force, we are country"	
UA-PSC-CP	« Per tu, per Aran »	"For you, for Aran"	
PRAG			
PP			
Corròp Quatre Lòcs	« Toti èm de besonh »	"Everyone is necessary"	

== Results ==
=== Overall ===
← Summary of the 24 May 2015 Conselh Generau d'Aran election results →
Parties and alliances	Popular vote			Seats	
Parties and alliances	Votes	%	±pp	Total	+/−
Unity of Aran-Socialists' Party of Catalonia-Candidatura de Progrés (UA-PSC-CP)	2,193	45.66	+4.53	5	±0
Aranese Democratic Convergence-Aranese Nationalist Party (CDA-PNA)	1,972	41.06	–5.32	7	±0
People's Party (PP)	178	3.71	–2.74	0	±0
Corròp Quatre Lòcs (CQL)	177	3.69	New	0	±0
Partit Renovador d'Arties e Garòs (PRAG)	130	2.71	+0.01	1	±0
Blank ballots	153	3.14	-0.13		
Total	4,803			13	±0
Valid votes	4,803	98.69	+0.94		
Invalid votes	64	1.31	-0.94		
Votes cast / turnout	4,867	69.86	-3.36		
Abstentions	2,100	30.14	+3.36		
Registered voters	6,967				

Popular vote
UA-PSC-CP	45.66%
CDA-PNA	41.06%
PP	3.71%
CQL	3.69%
PRAG	2.71%
Blank ballots	3.14%

Seats
UA-PSC-CP	38.46%
CDA-PNA	53.84%
PRAG	7.69%

=== Distribution by constituency ===
Constituency	UA-PSC-CP		CDA-PNA		PRAG	
Constituency	%	S	%	S	%	S
Arties e Garòs			55.0	1	34.6	1
Castièro	49.0	2	42.3	2		
Lairissa	44.6	—	49.6	1		
Marcatosa	43.3	—	51.6	1		
Pujòlo	44.7	1	51.4	1		
Quate Lòcs	55.7	2	24.7	1		
Total	45.7	5	41.0	7	2.7	1

== See also ==
- 2015 Spanish local elections
