= 2019 Aranese Council election =

Local election in Spain

- 26 May 2019

All 13 seats in the Conselh Generau d'Aran 7 seats needed for a majority
- Registered: 7,114 2.1%
- Turnout: 5.150 (75.39%); 2.5 pp
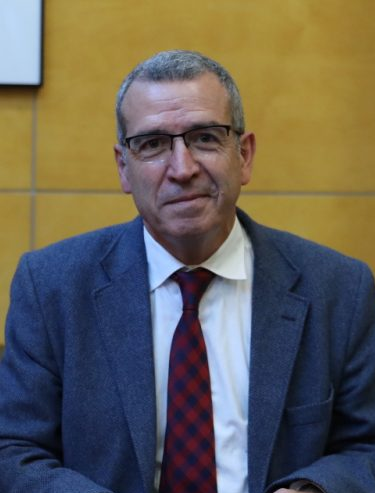

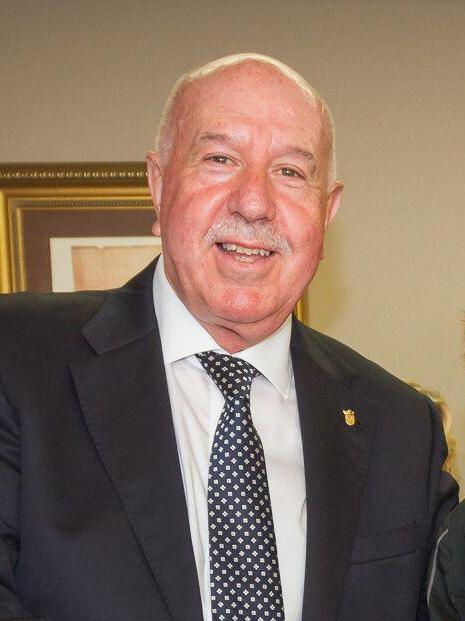
	First party	Second party
Leader	Francés Boya	Carles Barrera
Party	UA-PSC-CP	CDA-PNA
Leader's seat	Quate Lòcs	Castièro
Last election	5 seats, 47.16%	7 seats, 42.41%
Seats won	9	4
Seat change	4	3
Popular vote	2,527	1,523
Percentage	49.72%	29.97%
Swing	2.56 pp	12.44 pp
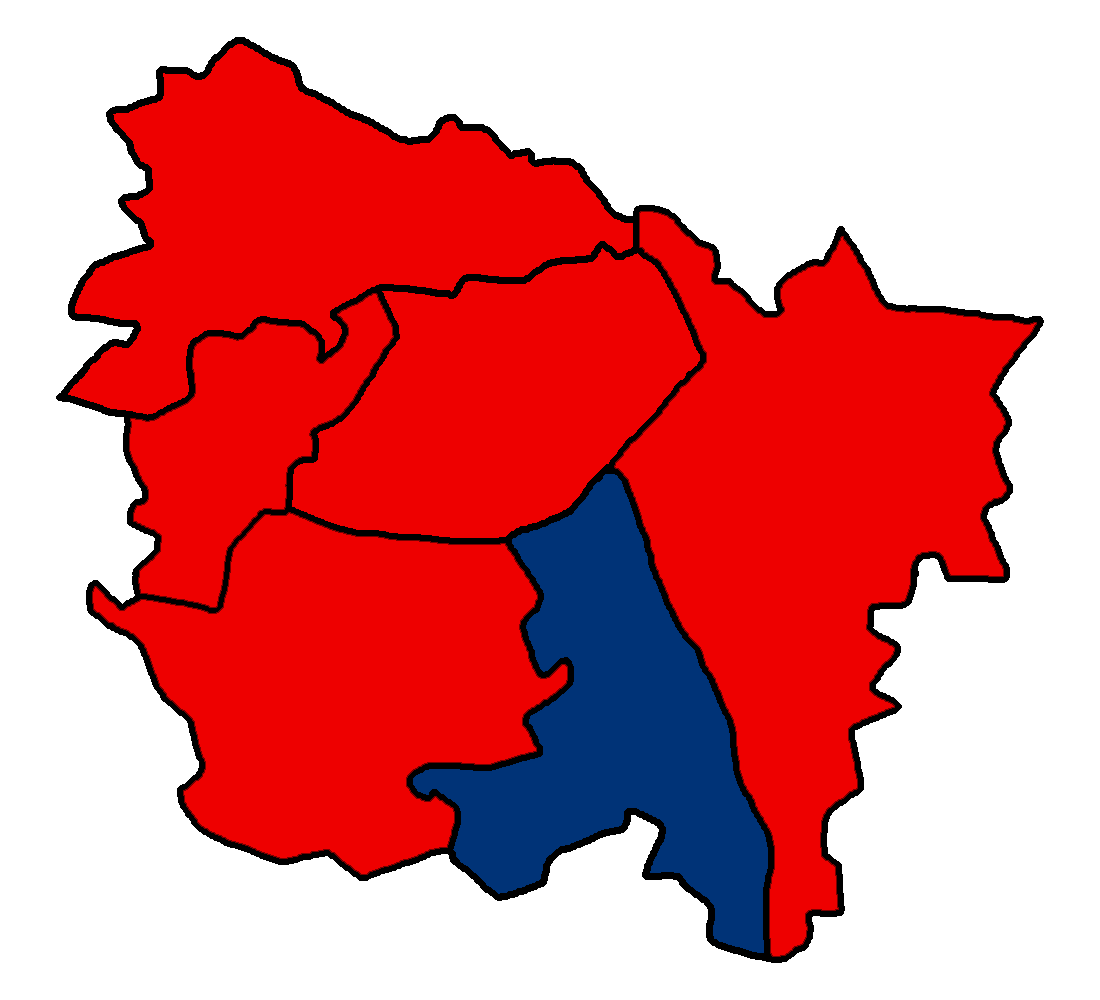
- UA-PSC-CP CDA-PNA; Constituency results map for the Conselh Generau d'Aran
Síndic d'Aran before election
Carlos Barrera
CDA-PNA
Elected Síndic d'Aran
Francés Boya
UA-PSC-CP

The 2019 Aranese Council Election, was held on Sunday, 26 May 2019, to elect the General Council of Aran, an administrative entity in the province of Lleida (Spain). All 13 seats in the Council were up for election. The election was held simultaneously with regional elections in twelve autonomous communities and local elections all throughout Spain, as well as the 2019 European Parliament election.

== Overview ==
=== Electoral system ===
The General Council of Aran is elected every four years on the basis of universal suffrage, which comprises all nationals over eighteen who can vote in the local elections in any of the 9 municipalities that make up Aran. It was officially established after the 1991 elections and is made up of 13 members. According to Law 16/1990, of July 13, on the special regime of the Val d'Aran, it is made up of the Síndic d'Aran, the General Councilors (Occitan: Conselhers Generaus), that work in plenary, and by the Commission of Accounts Auditors (Occitan: Commission d'Auditors de Compdes).

In every election, electors choose the General Councilors, that will later elect the Síndic, who acts as the head of government. Aran is divided in six electoral districts, whose borders coincide with those of the "thirds" (Occitan: Terçon, Catalan: Terçó, Spanish: Tersón), a traditional division of the valley. In every district, members are allocated using the proportional D'Hônt method with closed lists, with an electoral threshold of five percent of the valid votes in every district.

For the 2019 elections, members were distributed in the following way:

- Pujòlo: 2 members.
- Arties e Garòs: 2 members.
- Castièro: 4 members.
- Marcatosa: 1 member.
- Lairissa: 1 member.
- Quate Lòcs: 3 members.

As Catalonia has not developed its own electoral law, Aranese elections are regulated by Organic Law No. 5 of 19 June 1985, which regulates elections nationwide.

=== Election date ===
The date of the elections is set for the same day that local elections are held in Spain, that is, the fourth Sunday of May every 4 years.

== Parties and candidates ==
The electoral law allowed for parties and federations registered in the interior ministry, coalitions and groupings of electors to present lists of candidates. Parties and federations intending to form a coalition ahead of an election were required to inform the relevant Electoral Commission within ten days of the election call, whereas groupings of electors needed to secure the signature of at least one percent of the electorate in the constituencies for which they sought election, disallowing electors from signing for more than one list of candidates.

Below is a list of the main parties and electoral alliances which contested the election:

Candidacy	Parties and alliances	Leading candidate	Ideology	Previous result		Gov.	Ref.
Candidacy	Parties and alliances	Leading candidate	Ideology	Votes (%)	Seats	Gov.	Ref.
CDA-PNA	List: Aranese Democratic Convergence-Aranese Nationalist Party (CDA-PNA)	Carles Barrera	Liberalism; Aranese autonomy Occitan nationalism	42.41%	7	check	
UA-PSC-CP	List: Unity of Aran (UA); Socialists' Party of Catalonia (PSC); Candidatura de Progrés (CP)	Francés Boya	Social democracy Aranese autonomism	47.16%	5	X mark	
PRAG	List: Partit Renovador d'Arties e Garòs (PRAG)	Rafael Hinojosa	Localism; Progressivism; Aranese autonomy	2.7%	1	X mark	

== Campaign ==
=== Party slogans ===
Party or alliance	Original slogan	English translation	Ref.
CDA-PNA	« Eth trabalh d'aué ei futur tà deman »	"The work of today is future for tomorrow"	
UA-PSC-CP	« Aran ès tu »	"Aran is you"	
PRAG			
Aran Amassa	« Hèm era alternatiua »	"Let's make the alternative"	
Unidas Podemos	« La historia la escribes tú »	"You write the History"	
Cs			

== Results ==
=== Overall ===
← Summary of the 26 May 2019 Conselh Generau d'Aran election results →
Parties and alliances	Popular vote			Seats	
Parties and alliances	Votes	%	±pp	Total	+/−
Unity of Aran-Socialists' Party of Catalonia-Candidatura de Progrés (UA-PSC-CP)	2,527	49.72	+2.56	9	+4
Aranese Democratic Convergence-Aranese Nationalist Party (CDA-PNA)	1,523	29.97	–12.44	4	-3
Aran Amassa (Aran Amassa)	552	10.86	New	0	±0
United We Can (Unidas Podemos)	164	3.23	New	0	±0
Citizens-Citizens–Party of the Citizenry (Cs)	116	2.28	New	0	±0
Partit Renovador d'Arties e Garòs (PRAG)	97	1.91	+0.89	0	-1
Blank ballots	103	2.03	-1.11		
Total	5.082			13	±0
Valid votes	5.082	98.68	–0.01		
Invalid votes	68	1.32	+0.01		
Votes cast / turnout	5.150	72.39	+2.53		
Abstentions	1.964	27.61	-2.53		
Registered voters	7.114				

Popular vote
UA-PSC-CP	49.72%
CDA-PNA	29.97%
Others	18.28%
Blank ballots	2.03%

Seats
UA-PSC-CP	69.23%
CDA-PNA	30.76%

=== Distribution by constituency ===
Constituency	UA-PSC-CP		CDA-PNA	
Constituency	%	S	%	S
Arties e Garòs	28.9	1	36.6	1
Castièro	53.6	3	24.2	1
Lairissa	49.6	1	44.6	−
Marcatosa	41.9	1	37.5	−
Pujòlo	40.8	1	38.6	1
Quate Lòcs	57.2	2	26.8	1
Total	49.7	9	30.0	4

== See also ==
- 2019 Spanish local elections
