= Aran Amassa =

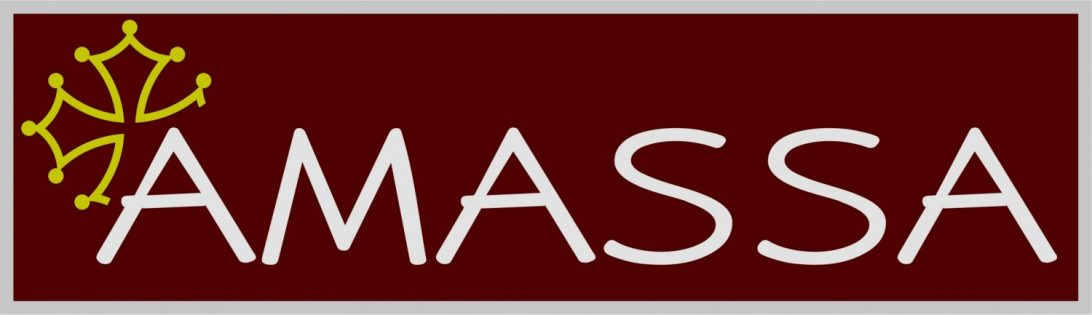
- President: Hug de la Rosa Ruperto
- General Secretary: Julián Fernández
- Founded: 2018
- Merger of: Corròp; United and Alternative Left; Som Alternativa; Popular Unity Candidacy; Occitan Republican Left
- Headquarters: Vielha e Mijaran
- Ideology: Socialism; Aranese self-determination Catalan independence Occitan nationalism Ecologism; Anticapitalism
- Political position: Far-left
- National affiliation: None. Linked to the Republican Left of Catalonia.
- General Council of Aran: 0 / 13
- Town councillors in the Aran Valley: 7 / 59
- Mayors in the Aran Valley: 1 / 9

Website
- www.aranamassa.org

Aran Amassa (in Aranese: Aran Together) is a political party in the Val d'Aran founded in 2018. The party defines itself as a left-wing alternative to the traditional two-party system in the Aran Valley. The majority of the members of Aran Amassa come from the Popular Unity Candidacy, Occitan Republican Left and United and Alternative Left.

== History ==
The party gained 4 municipal councillors in the 2019 local elections, but failed to gain a seat in the General Council of Aran.
