= Amparo Serrano Iglesias =

Spanish Aranese politician

Síndic d'Aran
- In office 12 July 1993 – 7 June 1995
- Preceded by: Maria Pilar Busquets
- Succeeded by: Carlos Barrera Sánchez

Personal details
- Political party: Amassadi per Aran (1999–2007); Aranese Democratic Union (1986–1999); Democratic Union of Catalonia (1986–2017)

Amparo Serrano Iglesias (born ?) is a Spanish Aranese politician who served as the second Síndic d'Aran, the head of government of the autonomous Val d'Aran, from July 1993 until June 1995. She was also the second woman to hold the office of Síndic d'Aran after her predecessor, Maria Pilar Busquets.

== Biography ==
In 1991, Serrano was elected to the Conselh Generau d'Aran, the governing legislature of the Val d'Aran, as a candidate from the Aranese Democratic Union (UDA) and the larger Aranese–Convergence and Unione electoral alliance. Her colleague, Maria Pilar Busquets of the Aranese Democratic Convergence (which was also a member of the coalition at the time), was elected the first Síndic d'Aran. However, two years later, disagreements arose in their coalition. Amparo Serrano filed a motion of no confidence against Busquets with the support of her own Aranese Democratic Union (UDA) and the Unity of Aran (UA) parties, successfully ousting Busquets. Serrano became Síndic d'Aran, serving from 12 July 1993 until 7 June 1995.

In the May 1995 Aranese council election, the opposition Aranese Democratic Convergence won the election and Carlos Barrera Sánchez became Síndic d'Aran.

Serrano attempted a political comeback in the 1999 and 2003 elections as a candidate for the now defunct Amassadi per Aran political party, but lost both elections.
