= Maria Pilar Busquets =

Spanish Aranese politician and writer

Maria Pilar Busquets e Medan

1st Síndic d'Aran
- In office 17 June 1991 – 12 July 1993
- Preceded by: José Calbetó Giménez President of the comarcal council
- Succeeded by: Amparo Serrano Iglesias

Member of the Parliament of Catalonia for Lleida
- In office 17 May 1984 – 21 January 1992

Personal details
- Born: 23 March 1937; Les, Val d'Aran, Spain
- Died: 13 November 2016 (aged 79); Barcelona, Catalonia, Spain
- Political party: Aranese Democratic Convergence
- Awards: Cross of Saint George (2017)

Maria Pilar Busquets i Medan (Occitan: Maria Pilar Busquets e Medan; 23 March 1937 – 13 November 2016) was a Spanish Aranese politician and writer, 1st Síndic d'Aran ("Head of the Government of the Valley") between 1991 and 1993.

== Career ==
Busquets worked in the hotel sector. She was the Gold Flower at the Floral Games of the Escola deras Pirenèos of Gascony and in the literary and poetry contest of the Ethnological Museum of the Aran Valley. She was a member of the Official Commission for Linguistic Normalization of Aranès, a founding member of the Es Tersús Neighborhood Association of the Vall d'Aran and head of culture from 1977 to 1980; she was president of the Association Pro Defense of the Trans-Pyrenean Axis by the Natural Step of the Valley of Aran. She collaborated in the document presented to the deputies who formed the Statute of Autonomy of Catalonia of 1979 to include a recognition of the differential identity of Val d'Aran.

Following the recovery of the historic medieval Val d'Aran Self-Government Institution, the Conselh Generau d'Aran, with the passing of Law 16/1990, of June 13, on 26 May 1991 won the first elections with the Aranese Coalition-Convergence and Union (CA-CiU), integrated by Aranese Democratic Convergence, of which Pilar Busquet were part, and Aranesa Democratic Union.

She was sworn in as Síndic d'Aran on 17 June 1991 until 12 July 1993, when the coalition was broken up and her colleague Amparo Serrano Iglesias, from UDA, filed a censorship motion with the support of Unity of Aran and Pilar Busquet resigned. She was also Member of the Parliament of Catalonia representing the Province of Lleida by CiU in the 1984 and 1988 elections in Catalonia, where she became the first deputy to speak Aranese language in the chamber and worked thoroughly on the paper that elaborated and defended the bill of special regime of Val d'Aran.

== Family ==
She was the mother of Jusèp Boya, Director General of Heritage of the Generalitat de Catalunya since 2016, of Quique Boya, who died in 2014, and of Mireia Boya, a member of the CUP for Lleida in the Parliament of Catalonia between 2016 and 2017 and candidate to Síndic d'Aran in 2019 elections

== Recognition ==
The Government of the Generalitat of Catalonia, granted her by the hands of President Carles Puigdemont posthumously the Creu de Sant Jordi on 11 April 2017.
