= Síndic d'Aran =

Head of the Conselh Generau d'Aran

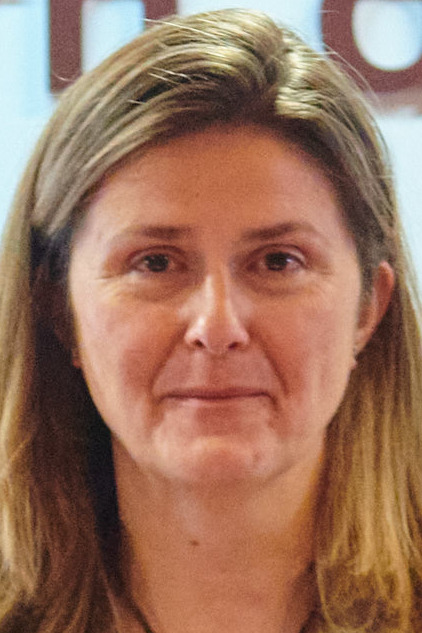
- Incumbent; Maria Vergés Pérez since 29 October 2020
- Inaugural holder: Maria Pilar Busquets
- Formation: 17 June 1991

The Síndic d'Aran (Occitan for 'Aran Syndic') is the head of government of the Val d'Aran, an autonomously governed region within the Province of Lleida of Catalonia, Spain. The Síndic leads the thirteen-member Conselh Generau d'Aran, the governing body of the region. The office of Síndic d'Aran and the larger autonomous government were created in June 1991.

The Síndic d'Aran is elected by the members of the Conselh Generau d'Aran. To be elected as Síndic, a candidate must win either an absolute majority in the first vote or a simple majority in the second round. Successful candidates serve a four-year term in office.

== List of Síndics d'Aran ==
Portrait	Name (Birth–Death)	Term of office			Party	Election
Portrait	Name (Birth–Death)	Took office	Left office	Duration	Party	Election
	Maria Pilar Busquets (1937–2016)	17 June 1991	12 July 1993		CDA	1991
	Amparo Serrano Iglesias	12 July 1993	7 June 1995		UDA	1991
	Carlos Barrera Sánchez (1950–2022)	7 June 1995	18 June 2007		CDA	1995
	Carlos Barrera Sánchez (1950–2022)	7 June 1995	18 June 2007		CDA	1999
	Carlos Barrera Sánchez (1950–2022)	7 June 1995	18 June 2007		CDA	2003
	Francés Boya (born 1960)	18 June 2007	18 June 2011		UA	2007
	Carlos Barrera Sánchez (1950–2022)	18 June 2011	18 June 2019		CDA	2011
	Carlos Barrera Sánchez (1950–2022)	18 June 2011	18 June 2019		CDA	2015
	Francés Boya (born 1960)	18 June 2019	29 October 2020		UA	2019
	Maria Vergés Pérez	29 October 2020	Incumbent		UA	2019
	Maria Vergés Pérez	29 October 2020	Incumbent		UA	2023
