= Maria Vergés Pérez =

Spanish politician and musician

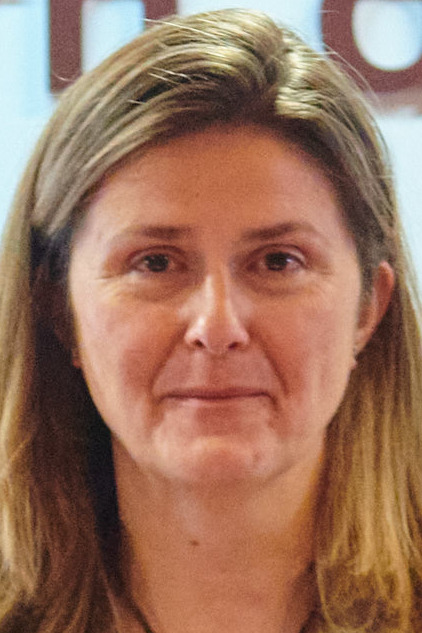
- Vergés in 2021

Síndic d'Aran
- Incumbent
- Assumed office 29 October 2020
- Preceded by: Francés Boya Alòs

Member of the Conselh Generau d'Aran
- Incumbent
- Assumed office 18 June 2019

Personal details
- Born: 1978 (age 47–48)
- Party: Unity of Aran
- Profession: Politician, Musician

Maria Vergés Pérez (born 1978) is a Spanish politician and musician from Aran, currently serving as the Síndic d'Aran, the head of government of the valley, since October 2020.

A member of the Unity of Aran party, she served as the Director of Culture and Language Policy during the first government of Síndic d'Aran Francés Boya Alòs from 2007 to 2011.

Vergés entered the plenary session of the Conselh Generau d'Aran, the governing body of the valley, since winning a seat in the 2019 Aranese Council election representing the constituency of the terçon of Castièro. She held the position of Vice Síndic d'Aran until she was elected Síndic d'Aran on 19 October 2020 following the resignation of her predecessor, Francés Boya, who left office to become general secretary of the Ministry for the Ecological Transition and the Demographic Challenge (MITECO) within the Spanish government. She formed a new Aranese government on 23 November that year, becoming the third woman to hold the office of Síndic d'Aran after Maria Pilar Busquets and Amparo Serrano Iglesias.

Outside of politics, Vergés is a member of the Aranese-language music band Bramatopin.
