= 2007 Aranese Council election =

Local election in Spain

- 27 May 2007

All 13 seats in the Conselh Generau d'Aran 7 seats needed for a majority
- Registered: 6,643 0.4%
- Turnout: 4,784 (72.02%); 1.7 pp
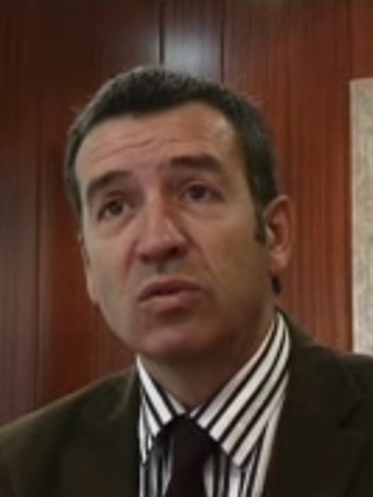

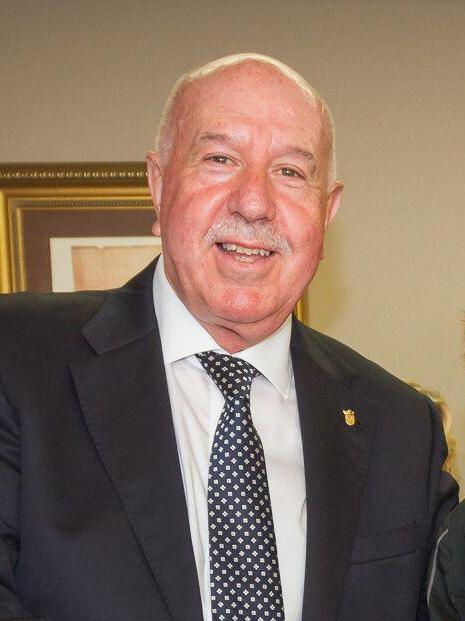

| | First party | Second party | Third party |
|---|---|---|---|
| Leader | Francés Boya | Carles Barrera | José Antonio Bruna |
| Party | UA-PSC-PM | CDA-PNA | PRAG |
| Leader's seat | Quate Lòcs | Castièro | Arties e Garòs |
| Last election | 5 seats, 39.14% | 7 seats, 45.06% | 1 seat, 3.20% |
| Seats won | 6 | 6 | 1 |
| Seat change | 1 | 1 | 0 |
| Popular vote | 2,198 | 2,030 | 180 |
| Percentage | 46.13% | 42.60% | 3.78% |
| Swing | 6.99 pp | 2.46 pp | 0.58 pp |
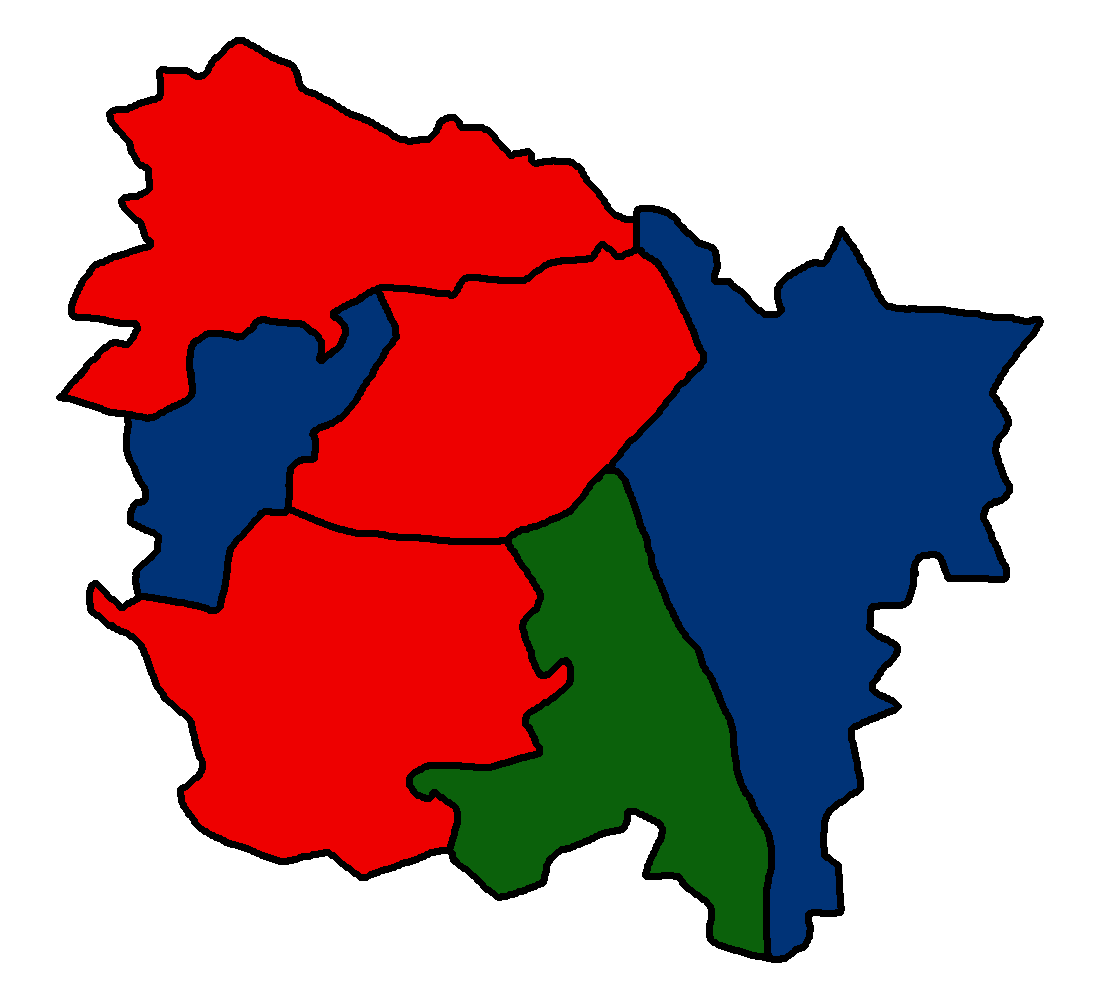
- UA-PSC-CP CDA-PNA PRAG; Constituency results map for the Conselh Generau d'Aran
Síndic d'Aran before election
Carles Barrera
CDA-PNA
Elected Síndic d'Aran
Francés Boya
UA-PSC-PM

The 2007 Aranese Council Election, was held on Sunday, 27 May 2007, to elect the General Council of Aran, an administrative entity in the province of Lleida (Spain). All 13 seats in the council were up for election. The election was held simultaneously with regional elections in twelve autonomous communities and local elections all throughout Spain.

== Overview ==
=== Electoral system ===
The General Council of Aran is elected every four years on the basis of universal suffrage, which comprises all nationals over eighteen who can vote in the local elections in any of the 9 municipalities that make up Aran. It was officially established after the 1991 elections and is made up of 13 members. According to Law 16/1990, of July 13, on the special regime of the Val d'Aran, it is made up of the Síndic of Aran, the General Councilors (Occitan: Conselhers Generaus), that work in plenary, and by the Commission of Accounts Auditors (Occitan: Commission d'Auditors de Compdes).

In every election, electors choose the General Councilors, that will later elect the Síndic, who acts as the head of government. Aran is divided in six electoral districts, whose borders coincide with those of the "thirds" (Occitan: Terçon, Catalan: Terçó, Spanish: Tersón), a traditional division of the valley. In every district, members are allocated using the proportional D'Hônt method with closed lists, with an electoral threshold of five percent of the valid votes in every district.

For the 2011 elections, members were distributed in the following way:

- Pujòlo: 2 members.
- Arties e Garòs: 2 members.
- Castièro: 4 members.
- Marcatosa: 1 member.
- Lairissa: 1 member.
- Quate Lòcs: 3 members.

As Catalonia has not developed its own electoral law, Aranese elections are regulated by Organic Law No. 5 of 19 June 1985, which regulates elections nationwide.

=== Election date ===
The date of the elections is set for the same day that local elections are held in Spain, that is, the fourth Sunday of May every 4 years.

== Parties and candidates ==
The electoral law allowed for parties and federations registered in the interior ministry, coalitions and groupings of electors to present lists of candidates. Parties and federations intending to form a coalition ahead of an election were required to inform the relevant Electoral Commission within ten days of the election call, whereas groupings of electors needed to secure the signature of at least one percent of the electorate in the constituencies for which they sought election, disallowing electors from signing for more than one list of candidates.

Below is a list of the main parties and electoral alliances which contested the election:

| Candidacy | Parties and alliances | Leading candidate | Ideology | Previous result | | Gov. | Ref. |
| Candidacy | Parties and alliances | Leading candidate | Ideology | Votes (%) | Seats | Gov. | Ref. |
|---|---|---|---|---|---|---|---|
| CDA-PNA | List: Aranese Democratic Convergence-Aranese Nationalist Party (CDA-PNA) | Carles Barrera | Liberalism; Aranese autonomy Occitan nationalism | 45.06% | 7 | check | |
| UA-PM-PSC | List: Unity of Aran (UA); Progrés Municipal de Catalunya (PM); Socialists' Party of Catalonia (PSC) | Francés Boya | Social democracy Aranese autonomism | 39.14% | 5 | X mark | |
| PRAG | List: Partit Renovador d'Arties e Garòs (PRAG) | José Antonio Bruna | Localism; Progressivism; Aranese autonomy | 3.20% | 1 | X mark | |

== Results ==
=== Overall ===
← Summary of the 27 May 2007 Conselh Generau d'Aran election results →
Graph of the party split among 13 seats.
| Parties and alliances | Popular vote | | | Seats | |
| Parties and alliances | Votes | % | ±pp | Total | +/− |
| Unity of Aran-Candidatura de Progrés-Socialists' Party of Catalonia (UA-CP-PSC) | 2,198 | 46.13 | | 6 | +1 |
| Aranese Democratic Convergence-Aranese Nationalist Party (CDA-PNA) | 2,030 | 42.60 | | 6 | -1 |
| People's Party (PP) | 225 | 4.72 | | 0 | ±0 |
| Partit Renovador d'Arties e Garòs (PRAG) | 180 | 3.78 | | 1 | ±0 |
| Blank ballots | 132 | 2.76 | | | |
| Total | 4,765 | | | 13 | ±0 |
| Valid votes | 4,765 | 99.60 | | | |
| Invalid votes | 19 | 0.40 | | | |
| Votes cast / turnout | 4,784 | 72,02 | | | |
| Abstentions | 1,859 | 27.98 | | | |
| Registered voters | 6,643 | | | | |

Popular vote
| UA-PSC-CP | 46.13% |
| CDA-PNA | 42.60% |
| PP | 4.72% |
| PRAG | 3.78% |
| Blank ballots | 2.76% |

Seats
| UA-PSC-CP | 46.15% |
| CDA-PNA | 46.15% |
| PRAG | 7.69% |

=== Distribution by constituency ===
| Constituency | UA-PSC-CP | | CDA-PNA | | PRAG | |
| Constituency | % | S | % | S | % | S |
|---|---|---|---|---|---|---|
| Arties e Garòs | | | 47.2 | 1 | 48.0 | 1 |
| Castièro | 46.9 | 2 | 42.9 | 2 | | |
| Lairissa | 46.3 | — | 50.6 | 1 | | |
| Marcatosa | 49.7 | 1 | 47.1 | — | | |
| Pujòlo | 44.8 | 1 | 47.2 | 1 | | |
| Quate Lòcs | 58.8 | 2 | 35.1 | 1 | | |
| Total | 46.1 | 6 | 42.6 | 6 | 3.8 | 1 |
