= 2011 Aranese Council election =

Local election in Spain

- 22 May 2011

All 13 seats in the Conselh Generau d'Aran 7 seats needed for a majority
- Registered: 6,676 0.5%
- Turnout: 4,888 (73.22%); 1.2 pp
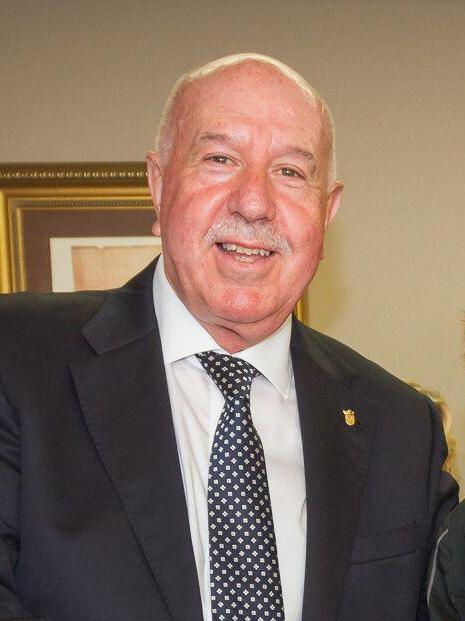

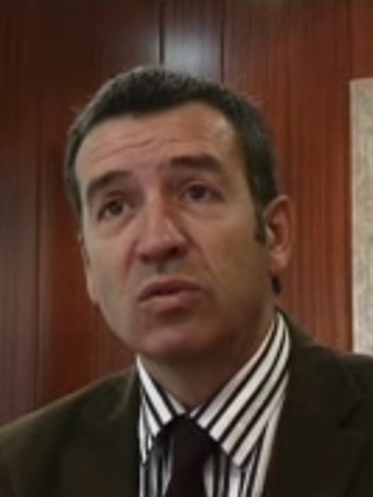

	First party	Second party	Third party
Leader	Carles Barrera	Francés Boya	José Antonio Bruna
Party	CDA-PNA	UA-PM-PSC	PRAG
Leader's seat	Castièro	Quate Lòcs	Arties e Garòs
Last election	6 seats, 42.60%	6 seats, 46.13%	1 seat, 3.78%
Seats won	7	5	1
Seat change	1	1	0
Popular vote	2,216	1,965	129
Percentage	46.38%	41.13%	2.70%
Swing	3.78 pp	5 pp	1.08 pp
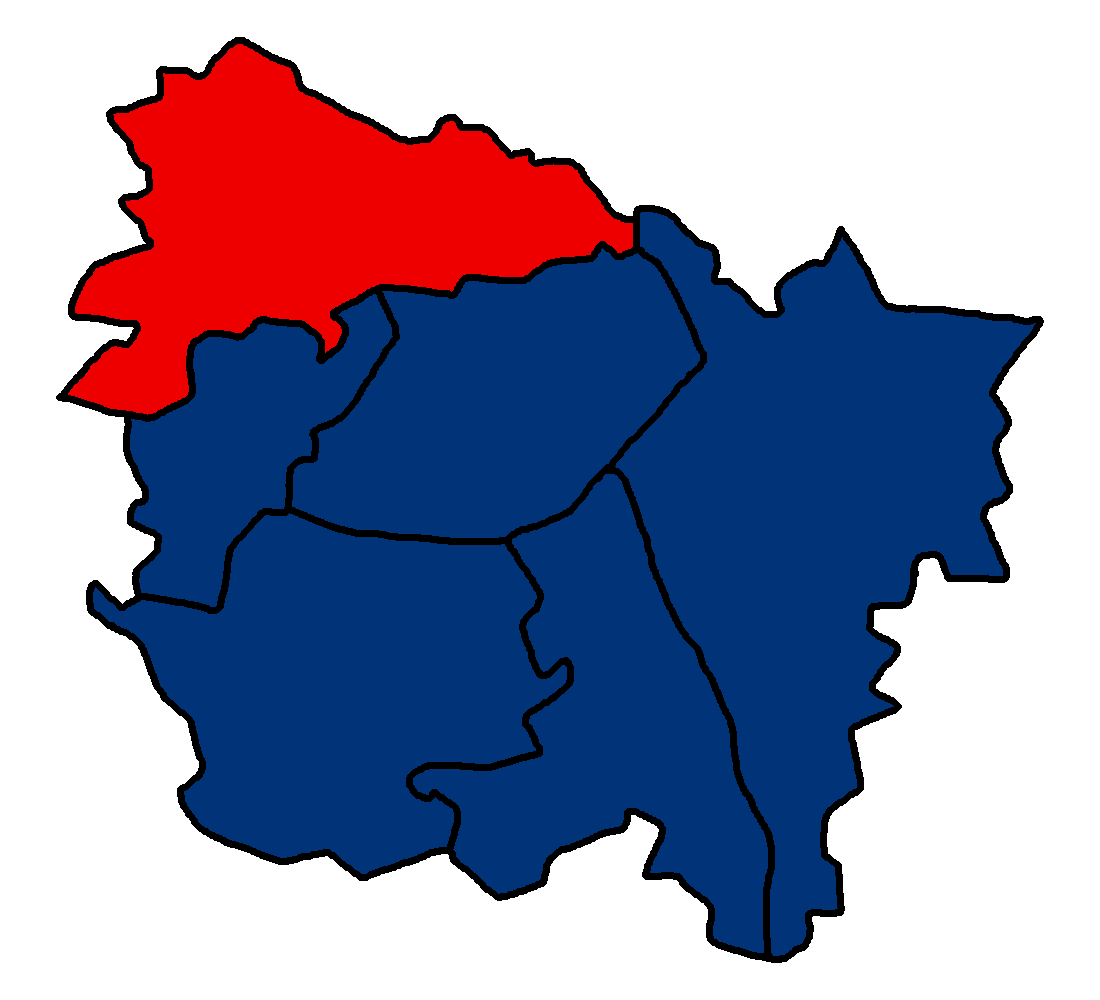
- UA-PSC-CP CDA-PNA; Constituency results map for the Conselh Generau d'Aran
Síndic d'Aran before election
Francés Boya
UA-PM-PSC
Elected Síndic d'Aran
Carlos Barrera
CDA-PNA

The 2011 Aranese Council Election, was held on Sunday, 22 May 2011, to elect the General Council of Aran, an administrative entity in the province of Lleida (Spain). All 13 seats in the Council were up for election. The election was held simultaneously with regional elections in twelve autonomous communities and local elections all throughout Spain.

== Overview ==
=== Electoral system ===
The General Council of Aran is elected every four years on the basis of universal suffrage, which comprises all nationals over eighteen who can vote in the local elections in any of the 9 municipalities that make up Aran. It was officially established after the 1991 elections and is made up of 13 members. According to Law 16/1990, of July 13, on the special regime of the Val d'Aran, it is made up of the Síndic of Aran, the General Councilors (Occitan: Conselhers Generaus), that work in plenary, and by the Commission of Accounts Auditors (Occitan: Commission d'Auditors de Compdes).

In every election, electors choose the General Councilors, that will later elect the Síndic, who acts as the head of government. Aran is divided in six electoral districts, whose borders coincide with those of the "thirds" (Occitan: Terçon, Catalan: Terçó, Spanish: Tersón), a traditional division of the valley. In every district, members are allocated using the proportional D'Hônt method with closed lists, with an electoral threshold of five percent of the valid votes in every district.

For the 2011 elections, members were distributed in the following way:

- Pujòlo: 2 members.
- Arties e Garòs: 2 members.
- Castièro: 4 members.
- Marcatosa: 1 member.
- Lairissa: 1 member.
- Quate Lòcs: 3 members.

As Catalonia has not developed its own electoral law, Aranese elections are regulated by Organic Law No. 5 of 19 June 1985, which regulates elections nationwide.

=== Election date ===
The date of the elections is set for the same day that local elections are held in Spain, that is, the fourth Sunday of May every 4 years.

== Parties and candidates ==
The electoral law allowed for parties and federations registered in the interior ministry, coalitions and groupings of electors to present lists of candidates. Parties and federations intending to form a coalition ahead of an election were required to inform the relevant Electoral Commission within ten days of the election call, whereas groupings of electors needed to secure the signature of at least one percent of the electorate in the constituencies for which they sought election, disallowing electors from signing for more than one list of candidates.

Below is a list of the main parties and electoral alliances which contested the election:

Candidacy	Parties and alliances	Leading candidate	Ideology	Previous result		Gov.	Ref.
Candidacy	Parties and alliances	Leading candidate	Ideology	Votes (%)	Seats	Gov.	Ref.
UA-PM-PSC	List: Unity of Aran (UA); Progrés Municipal de Catalunya (PM); Socialists' Party of Catalonia (PSC)	Francés Boya	Social democracy Aranese autonomism	46.13%	6	check	
CDA-PNA	List: Aranese Democratic Convergence-Aranese Nationalist Party (CDA-PNA)	Carles Barrera	Liberalism; Aranese autonomy Occitan nationalism	42.60%	6	X mark	
PRAG	List: Partit Renovador d'Arties e Garòs (PRAG)	José Antonio Bruna	Localism; Progressivism; Aranese autonomy	3.78%	1	check	

== Results ==
=== Overall ===
← Summary of the 22 May 2011 Conselh Generau d'Aran election results →
Parties and alliances	Popular vote			Seats	
Parties and alliances	Votes	%	±pp	Total	+/−
Aranese Democratic Convergence-Aranese Nationalist Party (CDA-PNA)	2,216	46.38	+3.78	7	+1
Unity of Aran-Socialists' Party of Catalonia-Candidatura de Progrés (UA-PSC-CP)	1,965	41.13	-5.00	5	-1
People's Party (PP)	308	6.45	+1.73	0	±0
Partit Renovador d'Arties e Garòs (PRAG)	129	2.70	-1.08	1	±0
Blank ballots	160	3.27	+0.51		
Total	4,778			13	±0
Valid votes	4,778	97.75	-1.85		
Invalid votes	110	2.25	+1.85		
Votes cast / turnout	4,888	73.22	+1.20		
Abstentions	2,100	26.78	-1.20		
Registered voters	6,676				

Popular vote
CDA-PNA	46.38%
UA-PSC-CP	41.13%
PP	6.45%
PRAG	2.70%
Blank ballots	3.27%

Seats
CDA-PNA	53.84%
UA-PSC-CP	38.46%
PRAG	7.69%

=== Distribution by constituency ===
Constituency	UA-PSC-CP		CDA-PNA		PRAG	
Constituency	%	S	%	S	%	S
Arties e Garòs			60.4	1	34.2	1
Castièro	41.7	2	60.4	2		
Lairissa	36.7	—	56.9	1		
Marcatosa	42.6	—	52.6	1		
Pujòlo	42.2	1	47.6	1		
Quate Lòcs	52.5	2	39.7	1		
Total	41.1	5	46.4	7	2.7	1

== See also ==
- 2011 Spanish local elections
