= Carlos Barrera Sánchez =

Spanish politician (1950–2022)

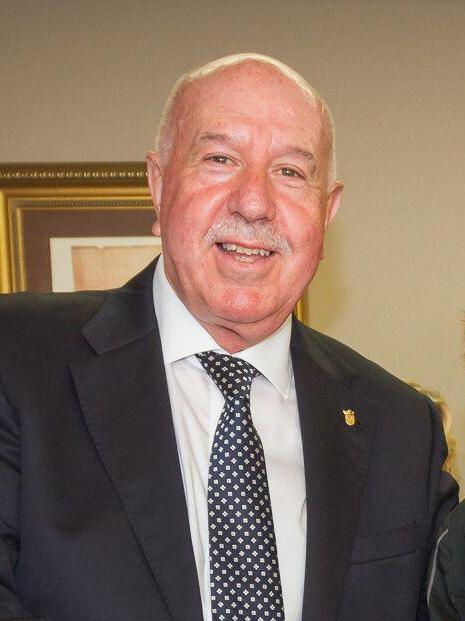
- Barrera in 2017

Síndic d'Aran
- In office 18 June 2011 – 18 June 2019
- Preceded by: Francés Boya Alòs
- Succeeded by: Francés Boya Alòs
- In office 7 June 1995 – 18 June 2007
- Preceded by: Amparo Serrano Iglesias
- Succeeded by: Francés Boya Alòs

Personal details
- Born: 3 December 1950 Vielha, Spain
- Died: 7 April 2022 (aged 71) Vielha, Spain
- Party: CDA

Carlos Barrera e Sánchez (3 December 1950 – 7 April 2022) was a Spanish Aranese politician. A member of the Aranese Democratic Convergence, he served as Síndic d'Aran from 1995 to 2007 and again from 2011 to 2019.

He died in Vielha on 7 April 2022 at the age of 71.
