= Corròp =

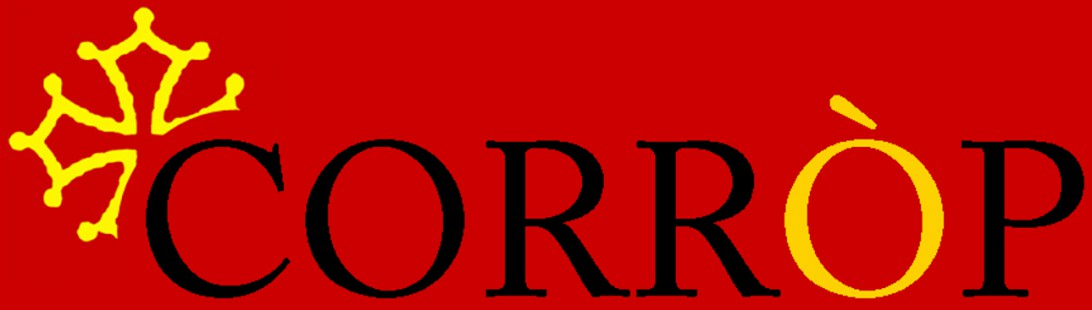
- President: Collective leadership
- Founded: May 08, 2015
- Dissolved: 2018
- Merged into: Aran Amassa
- Ideology: Socialism; Aranese self-determination Catalan independence Occitan nationalism Ecologism; Anticapitalism
- Political position: Far left
- National affiliation: None. Linked to the Occitan Libertat! and to the Catalan Popular Unity Candidacy.
- Town councillors in the Aran Valley: 2 / 59
- Parliament of Catalonia: 0 / 135

Website
- www.corrop.oc

Corròp (in Aranese: group of people associated with a common objective) was a political party in the Val d'Aran founded in 2015. The party defends Occitan and Aranese self-determination, socialism in an anticapitalist sense, direct democracy and ecologism. Corròp also supports an autonomous Aran Valley in an independent Catalonia as the best short-term solution to the Aranese issue and the Catalan independence debate in the valley, considering that the independence of Catalonia is good for both Aran and the whole Occitania.

The majority of the members of Corròp come from the Aranese section of Libertat!, an Occitan left-wing independentism movement. The party's main referent in Catalonia is the Popular Unity Candidacy, which included a member of Corròp as its candidate in the Catalan elections of 2015. Nevertheless, Corròp also included Occitan Republican Left and Initiative for Catalonia Greens.
