= Arró =

- Village
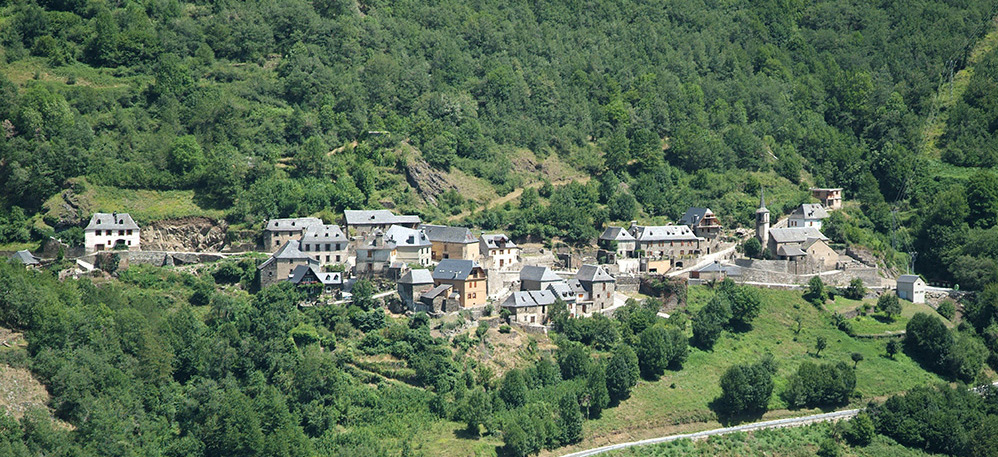

- Location in Catalonia
- Coordinates: 42°44′40″N 0°42′44″E
- Country: Spain
- Community: Catalonia
- Province: Lleida
- Special division: Val d'Aran
- Municipality: Es Bòrdes
- Elevation: 914 m (2,999 ft)

Population (2005)
  - Total: 25
- Postal code: 25551
- Climate: Cfb

Arró (Occitan pronunciation: [aˈru]) is a village located in the municipality of Es Bòrdes (Val d'Aran), Catalonia. It was an independent municipality before 1847.

== Description ==
The village is located at an altitude of 885 m, to the right of the Garonne, in the extreme northwest of the municipal district. It has a small population of 25 inhabitants (2005), joined by a short branch on the N-230 road. It is presided over by the parochial church of Sant Martí, of Romanesque and Gothic origin with an octagonal bell tower.
