= Es Bòrdes =

- Municipality
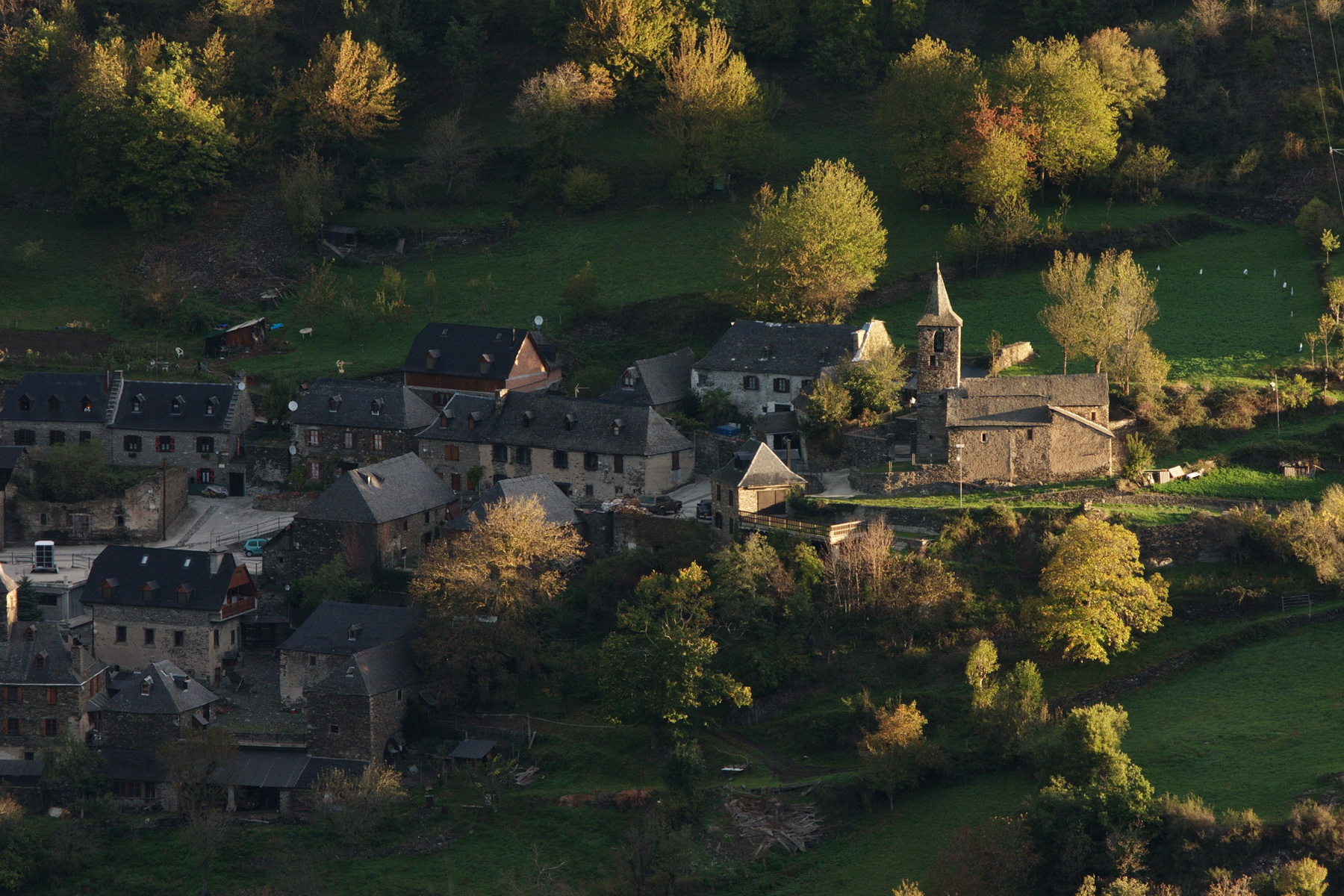
- Es Bòrdes

- Location in Aran

- Location in Catalonia
- Coordinates: 42°44′23″N 0°43′15″E
- Country: Spain
- Community: Catalonia
- Province: Lleida
- Entity: Aran
- Terçon: Irissa

Government
  - Mayor: Rosa Mirat Marqués (2015) (UA)

Area
  - Total: 21.4 km^{2} (8.3 sq mi)

Population (2025-01-01)
  - Total: 281
  - Density: 13.1/km^{2} (34.0/sq mi)
- Website: www.bordes.cat

Es Bòrdes (Occitan pronunciation: [ez ˈβɔrðes]) is a municipality in western Aran, Province of Lleida, Catalonia, Spain. It has a population of 281 (register office, 2025). The mayor is Rosa Mirat Marqués (UA). The municipality includes a small exclave to the west. It is located in the terçon of Irissa.

== Subdivisions ==
The municipality is composed of four different settlements:

- Arró
- Begós
- Benós
- Es Bòrdes
