= Conselh Generau d'Aran =

Coordinates: 42.7029°N 0.7961°E

General Council of Aran Conselh Generau d'Aran

Type
- Type: Unicameral of Val d'Aran

History
- Founded: 1991

Leadership
- Síndic: Maria Vergés Pérez, UA-PSC since 29 October 2020

Structure
- Seats: 13
- Political groups: UA-PSC (9) CDA (4)

Elections
- Last election: 28 May 2023

Meeting place
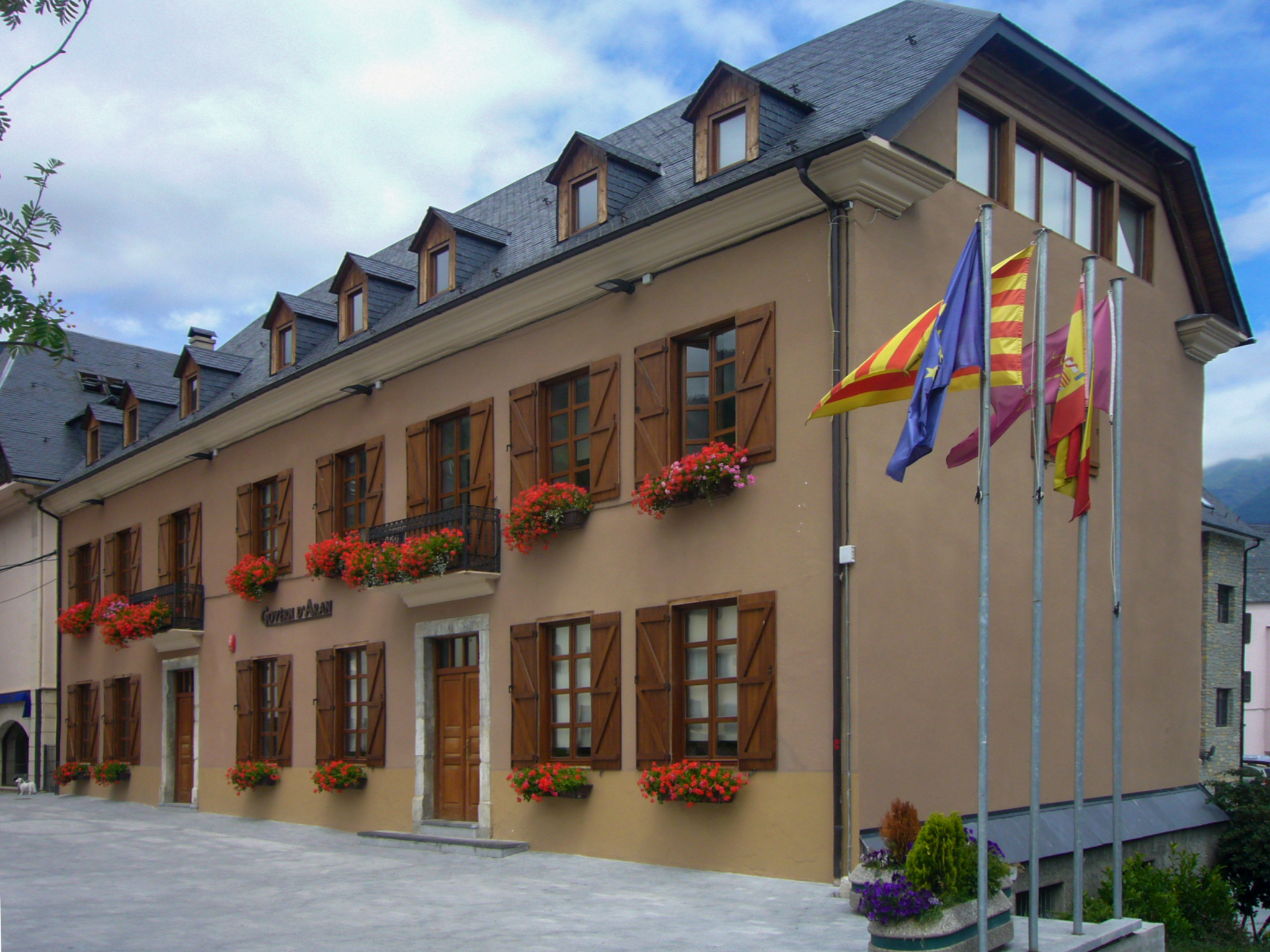
- Conselh Generau seat, Vielha e Mijaran

Website
- conselharan.org

The General Council of Aran (Aranese: Conselh Generau d'Aran) is the autonomous governing body of the territory of the Aran Valley in Catalonia. The chamber is headed by the Sindic d'Aran.

== Composition ==
The General Council of Aran is composed by 13 members elected every four years, concurrently with local elections. Aran is divided into six electoral districts (terçons):

Constituency	Seats
Pujòlo	2
Arties e Garòs	2
Castièro	4
Marcatosa	1
Lairissa	1
Quate Lòcs	3

=== Results of the elections to the Conselh Generau d'Aran ===
General Councilors in the Conselh Generau d'Aran since 1991
Key to parties UA-PSC PRAG UDA CDA
Election	Distribution	Síndic
1991	6 / 7	Maria Pilar Busquets (CDA) (1991-1993)
1991	6 / 7	Amparo Serrano Iglesias (UDA) (1993-1995)
1995	4 / 2 / 7	Carlos Barrera (CDA)
1999	2 / 1 / 1 / 9	Carlos Barrera (CDA)
2003	5 / 1 / 7	Carlos Barrera (CDA)
2007	6 / 1 / 6	Francés Boya (UA-PSC)
2011	5 / 1 / 7	Carlos Barrera (CDA)
2015	5 / 1 / 7	Carlos Barrera (CDA)
2019	9 / 4	Francés Boya (UA-PSC) (2019-2020)
2019	9 / 4	Maria Vergés (UA-PSC) (2020-2023)
2023	9 / 4	Maria Vergés (UA-PSC)

== Síndic d'Aran ==
The Síndic d'Aran (English: Syndic of Aran) is the head of the autonomous governing body and leads the General Council. He or she is also the ex officio chairman of all the Collegial Institutions and the companies under the authority of the council.

=== List of syndics ===
No.	Photo	Name	Party	Took office	Left office
1		Maria Pilar Busquets	CDA	17 June 1991	12 July 1993
2		Amparo Serrano Iglesias	UDA	12 July 1993	7 June 1995
3		Carlos Barrera Sánchez	CDA	7 June 1995	18 June 2007
4		Francés Boya	UA-PSC	18 June 2007	18 June 2011
5		Carlos Barrera Sánchez	CDA	18 June 2011	18 June 2019
6		Francés Boya	UA-PSC	18 June 2019	29 October 2020
7		Maria Vergés Pérez	UA-PSC	29 October 2020	Present
