= Begós =

- Locality
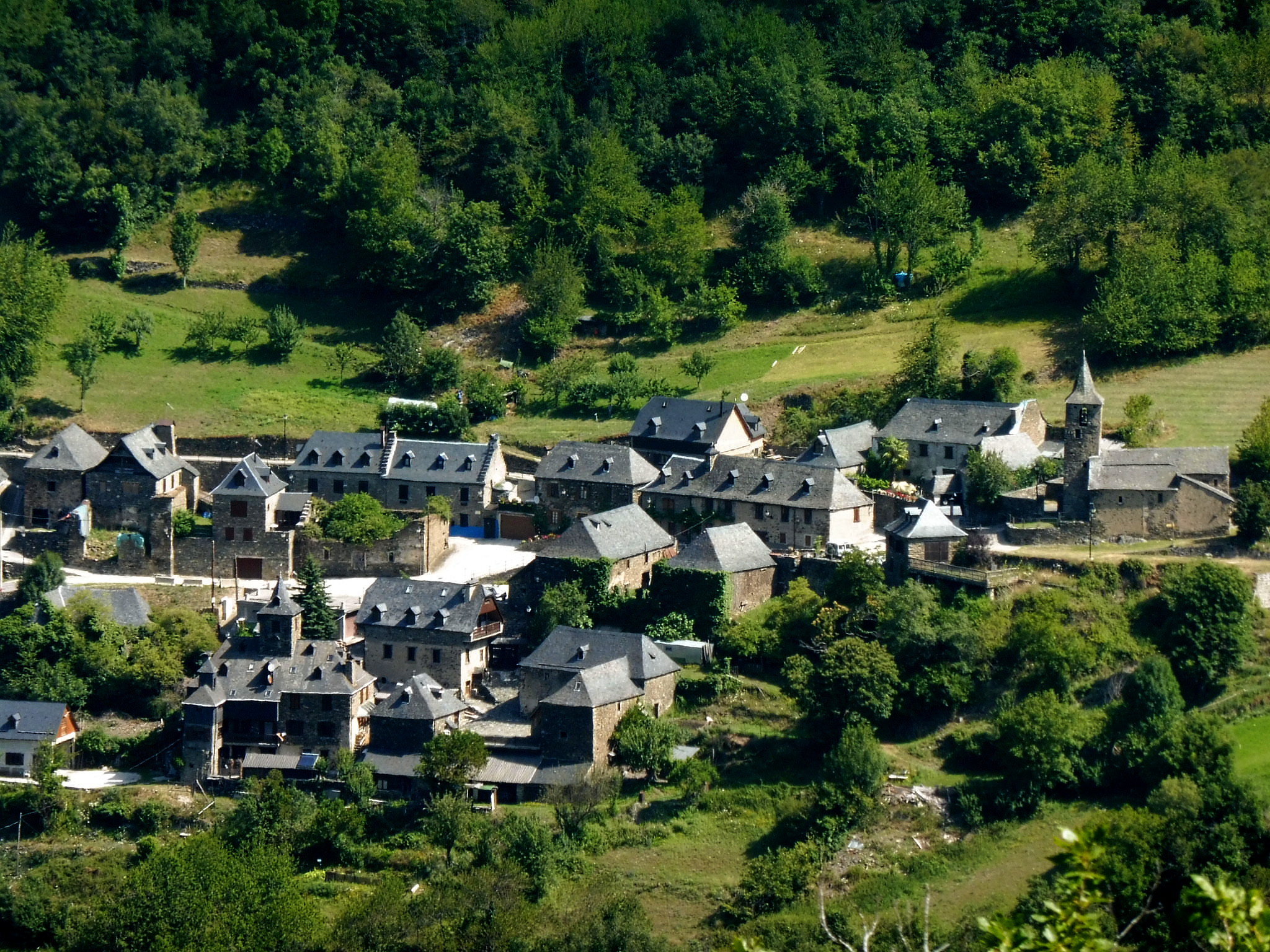

- Location within Province of Lleida Location within Catalonia Location within Spain
- Coordinates: 42°44′27″N 0°44′7″E
- Country: Spain
- Community: Catalonia
- Province: Lleida
- Municipality: Es Bòrdes
- Elevation: 983 m (3,225 ft)

Population
  - Total: 18

Begós (Occitan pronunciation: [beˈɣus]) is a locality located in the municipality of Es Bòrdes, in the Province of Lleida of Catalonia, Spain. As of 2020, it has a population of 18.

== Geography ==
Begós is located 171km north of Lleida.
