= Occitan Republican Left =

Occitan Republican Left Esquèrra Republicana Occitana
- President: Jusèp Loís Sans Socasau
- Founded: 27 August 2008
- Ideology: Occitan nationalism
- Political position: Centre-left to left-wing

Occitan Republican Left (Occitan: Esquèrra Republicana Occitana) is an Occitanist political party in Val d'Aran comarca of Catalonia, Spain. Founded in 2008 to contest Unity of Aran (PSC section) and Aranese Democratic Convergence (CDC section) at 2011 elections for the Aranese General Council, the party acts practically as the local section of the Republican Left of Catalonia and is chaired by Jusèp Loís Sans Socasau.

Efforts to establish ERO began in 2005 when it was announced that a new political party in Val d'Aran shall be launched in order to challenge the ongoing UA-CDA hegemony in the comarca. ERO targets to reinforce the Occitan identity of Val d'Aran within Catalonia and opposes centralism, a stance backed by the statute of the Republican Left of Catalonia. The party also maintains a youth organisation named Youth of the Occitan Republican Left (Joenesses de Esquèrra Republicana Occitana).
