= Benós =

- Locality
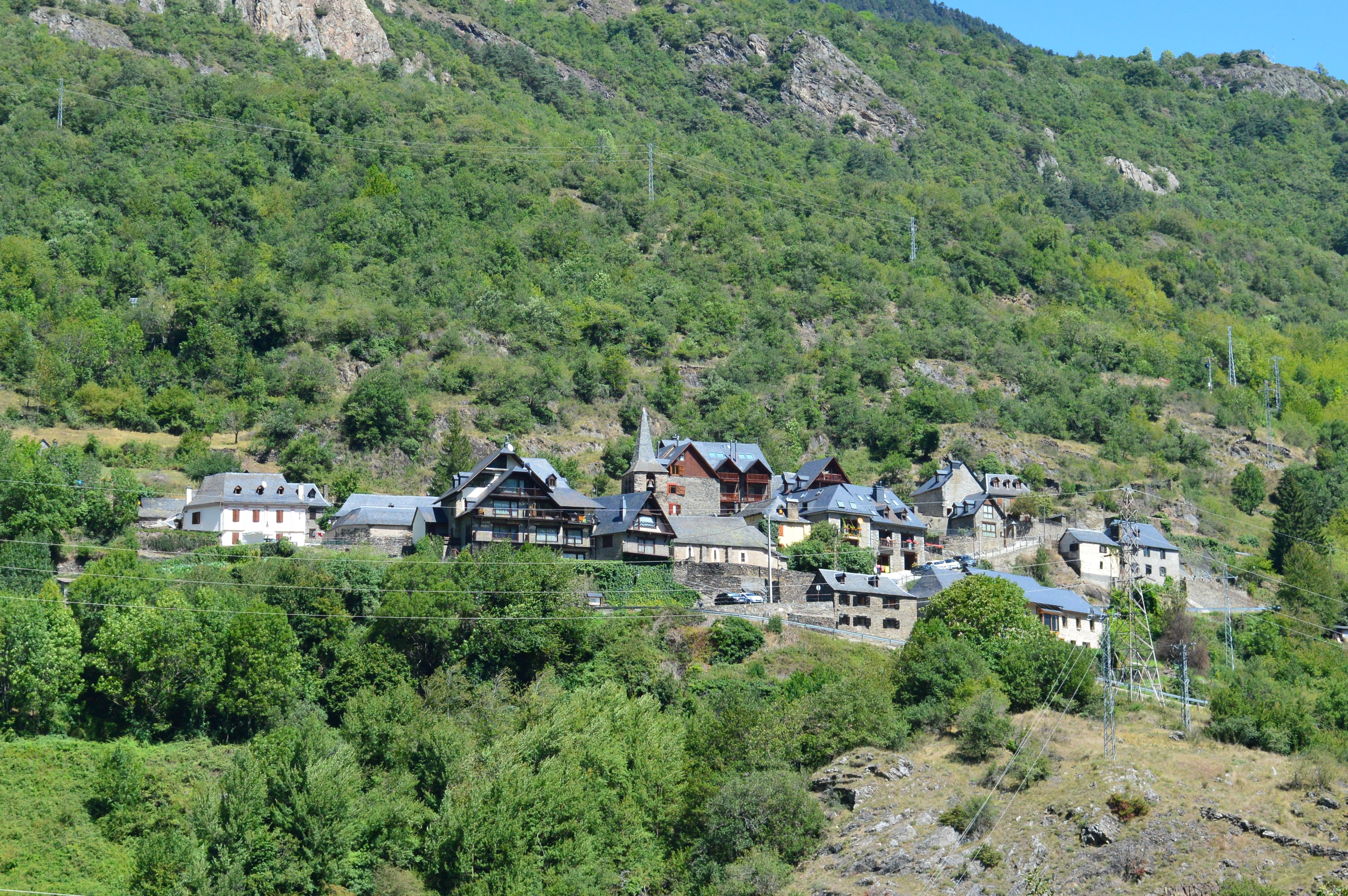

- Location within Province of Lleida Location within Catalonia Location within Spain
- Coordinates: 42°44′22″N 0°43′42″E
- Country: Spain
- Community: Catalonia
- Province: Lleida
- Municipality: Es Bòrdes
- Elevation: 891 m (2,923 ft)

Population
  - Total: 26

Benós (Occitan pronunciation: [beˈnus]) is a locality located in the municipality of Es Bòrdes, in the Province of Lleida of Catalonia, Spain. As of 2020, it has a population of 26.

== Geography ==
Benós is located 170km north of Lleida.
