= Aranea =

Aranea may refer to:

- A genus of orb-weaver spiders, synonym of Araneus
- Aranea Serket, a character from the webcomic Homestuck (2009-2016)
- A character in E. B. White's children's novel Charlotte's Web and its film adaptations, a baby spider who is Charlotte's daughter
- Aranea Highwind, a character in the game Final Fantasy XV
- Aranea (Dungeons & Dragons), fictional creatures from the Dungeons & Dragons game

== See also ==
- Aranae, an order of flowering plants
- Araneae, the order of spiders
