= Les, Val d'Aran =

Les
- Municipality
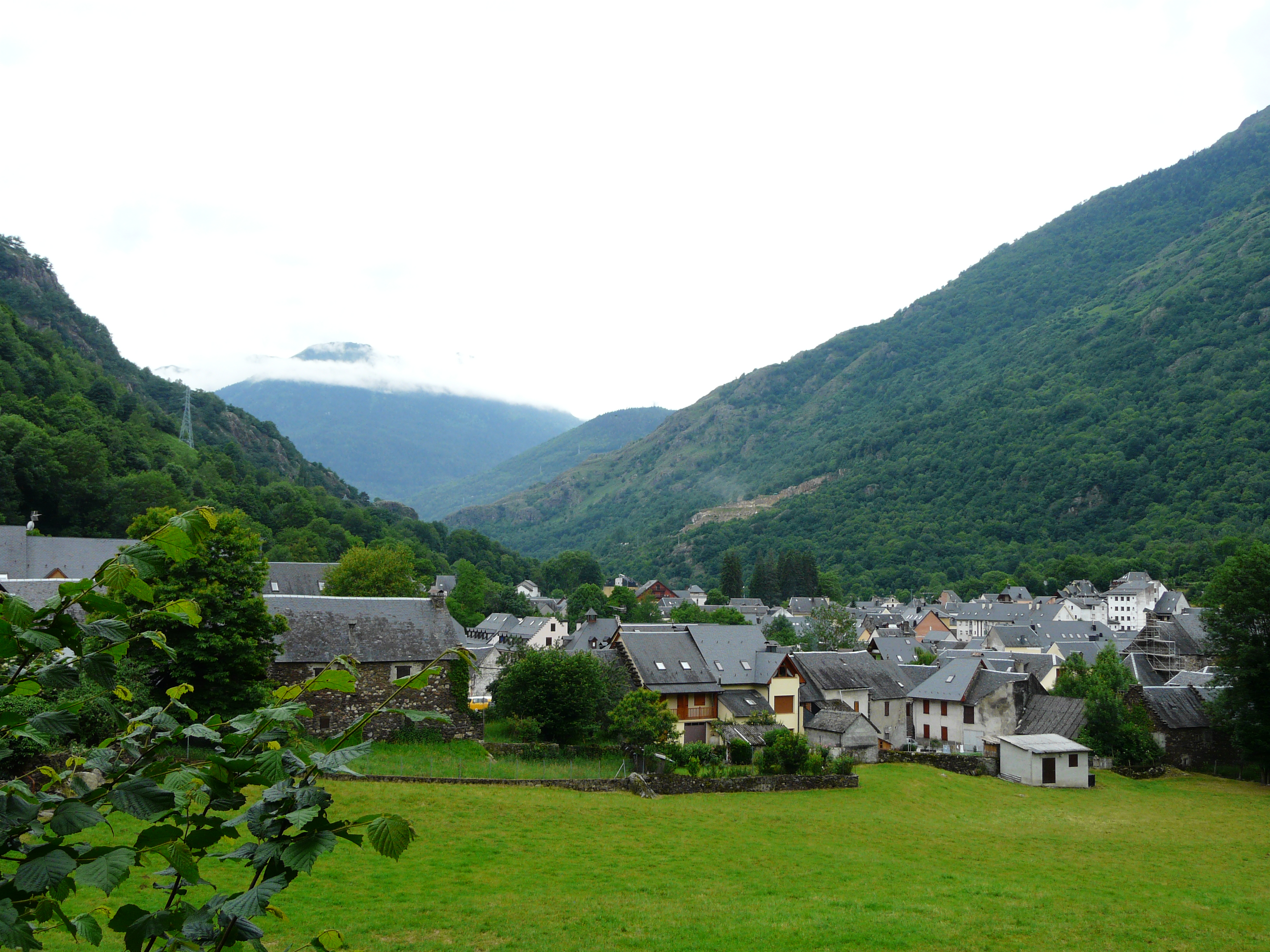
- The town of Les

- Coat of arms

- Location in Aran

- Location in Catalonia
- Coordinates: 42°48′43″N 00°42′47″E
- Country: Spain
- Community: Catalonia
- Province: Lleida
- Entity: Aran
- Terçon: Quate Lòcs

Government
  - Mayor: Andreu Cortés Labrid (2019) (UA)

Area
  - Total: 23.4 km^{2} (9.0 sq mi)
- Elevation: 634 m (2,080 ft)

Population (2025-01-01)
  - Total: 1,036
  - Density: 44.3/km^{2} (115/sq mi)
- Postal code: 25540
- Climate: Cfb
- Website: www.les.es

Les (Occitan pronunciation: [ˈles]) is a municipality in the northwest of Aran, Province of Lleida, Catalonia, Spain. It has a population of 1,036 (register office, 2025). The mayor is Andreu Cortés Labrid (UA). It is located in the terçon of Quate Lòcs.
