= Partit Renovador d'Arties e Garòs =

Renewalist Party of Arties e Garòs Partit Renovador d'Arties e Garòs
- Leader: Jose Antonio Bruna Vilanova
- Ideology: Localism; Progressivism; Aranese autonomy
- Political position: Centre-left
- National affiliation: Unitat d'Aran
- Conselh Generau d'Aran: 0 / 13

Partit Renovador d'Arties e Garòs (Renewalist Party of Arties e Garòs, PRAG) is a political party active in Arties e Garòs, the southeasternmost terçon of Aran (Catalonia).

The party is associated with Unity of Aran (UA), which is not present in the terçon of Arties e Garòs. Its general secretary is Jose Antonio Bruna Vilanova.

== Electoral performance ==
=== General Council of Aran ===
Date	Votes			Seats		Status	Size
Date	#	%	±pp	#	±	Status	Size
1999	120	2.7%	—	1 / 13	—	Opposition	4th
2003	155	3.2%	+0.5	1 / 13	0	Opposition	3rd
2007	180	3.8%	+0.6	1 / 13	0	Government	3rd
2011	129	2.7%	–1.1	1 / 13	0	Opposition	3rd
2015	130	2.7%	±0.0	1 / 13	0	Opposition	3rd
2019	97	1.9%	-0.8	0 / 13	1	Not represented	4th
