= Occitan nationalism =

Political movement for self-determination in Occitania

Flag of Occitania

Occitan nationalism is a social and political movement in Occitania. Nationalists seek self-determination, greater autonomy or the creation of a sovereign state of Occitania. The basis of nationalism is linguistic and cultural although currently the Occitan language is spoken by a minority within the language area. Therefore, it has minority language status under the law in France.

== Current affairs ==
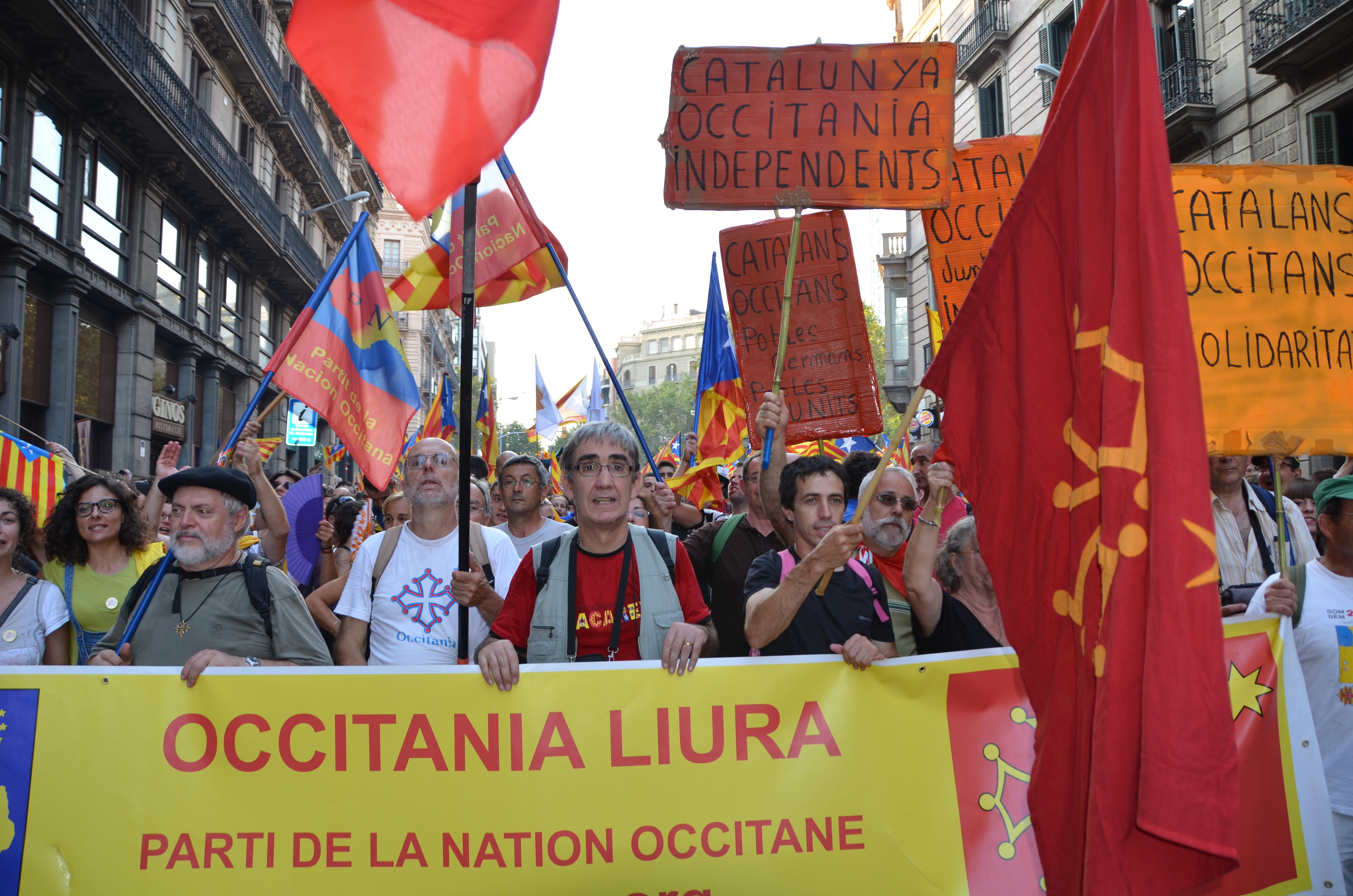
Demonstration in Barcelona in 2012

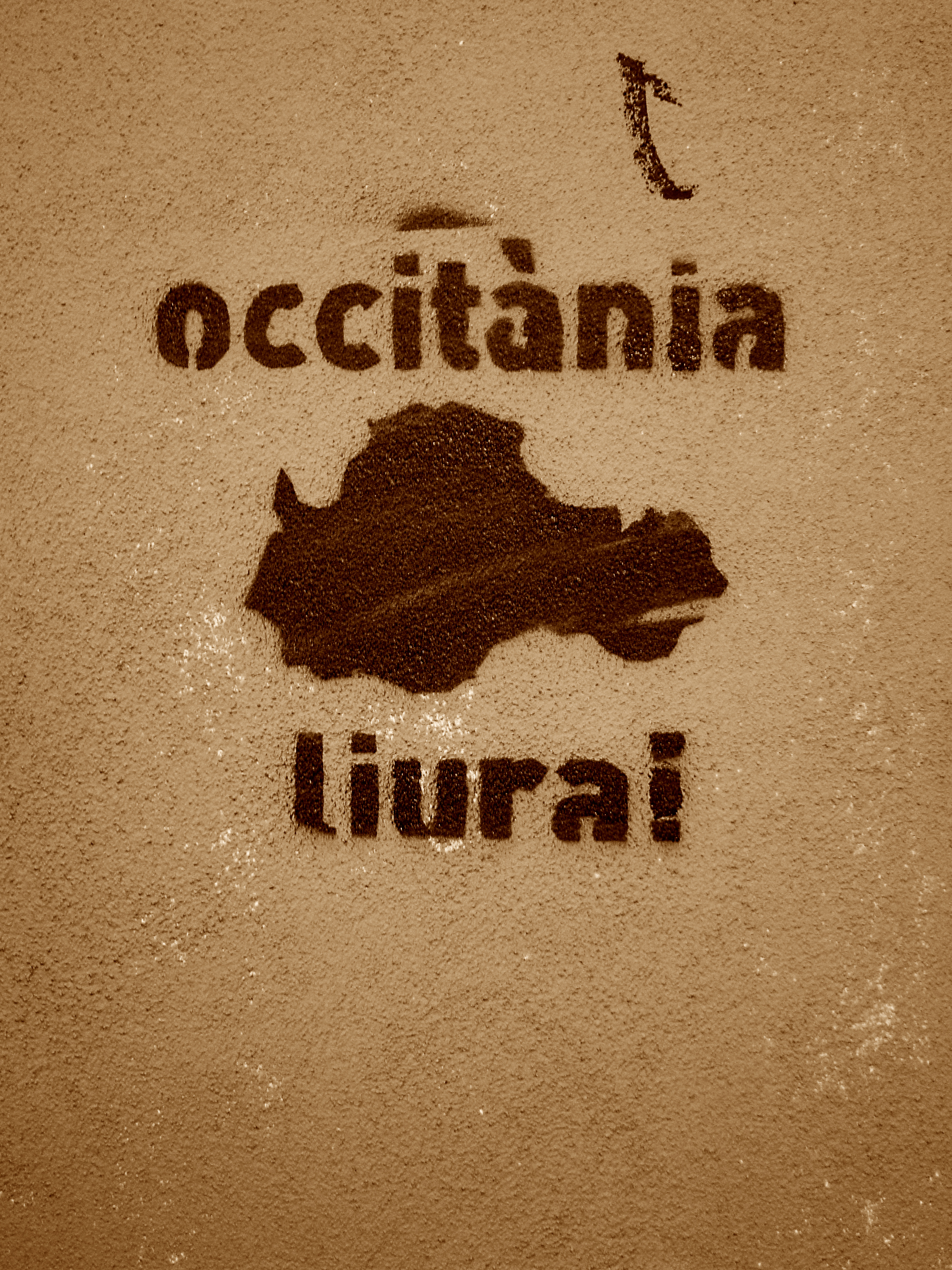
Nationalist graffiti. Reads "Free Occitania!"

The Occitan political movement for self-government has existed since the beginning of the 20th century and particularly since the post-war era. Occitan nationalism emerged as a sense of grievance of Southern France caused by the economic and energy restructuring undertaken by the Gaullists during the 1960s, which would have given priority to the more prosperous northern regions of France.

Subsequently, from 1968 on, Occitan cultural revival, combined with the economic protest, given the results in 1970 in a nationalist claim that it considered Occitania was an internal colony of the French state. The movement remains negligible in electoral and political terms. However, the regional Elections in 2010 allowed the Partit Occitan to enter the regional councils of Aquitaine, Auvergne, Midi-Pyrénées, and Provence-Alpes-Côte d'Azur.

== Territorial claims ==
The following table shows the size and population of the territories claimed by the Occitan nationalism is as follows:

Country	Territory claimed	Area (km²)	Population (year)
Spain	Aran Valley (Catalonia)	634	9,993 (2014)
France	Auvergne-Rhône-Alpes (except for Allier and former Rhône-Alpes, but includes Ardèche and Drôme)	30,372	1,829,328 (2013)
France	Nouvelle-Aquitaine (except French Basque Country and former Poitou-Charentes)	55,283	3,755,705 (2013)
France	Occitania (except Pyrénées-Orientales)	68,608	5,221,173 (2013)
France	Provence-Alpes-Côte d'Azur	31,400	4,953,675 (2013)
Italy	Guardia Piemontese (Calabria)	21	1,895 (2015)
Italy	(Liguria) (Piedmont) Occitan Valleys	4,500	174,476 (2013)
Monaco		2	38,400 (2015)
	Occitania	190,820	15,984,645

== Political parties ==
- Occitan Party
- Occitan Nation Party - Partit de la Nacion Occitana (PNO)
- Anaram Au Patac
- Iniciativa Per Occitània
- Paratge
- Occitan Republican Left
- Unitat d'Òc
- Lucha Occitana
- Corròp
- Unitat d'Aran
- Aranese Democratic Convergence
- Bastir!

== See also ==
- European Free Alliance
