= Unity of Aran =

Unity of Aran Unitat d'Aran
- President: Antonio Arturo Calbetó Calbetó
- General Secretary: Francés Boya Alòs
- Founded: 2 February 1980
- Ideology: Social democracy Aranese autonomism
- Political position: Centre-left
- Regional affiliation: Socialists' Party of Catalonia
- Conselh Generau d'Aran: 9 / 13
- Town councillors in Val d'Aran: 32 / 59

Website
- unitatdaran.org

Unity of Aran (Aranese: Unitat d'Aran, also Unitat d'Aran - Partit Nacionalista Aranés) is a political party in Val d'Aran, Spain. Practically the Aranese section of Socialists' Party of Catalonia (PSC), it is the ruling party of the comarca.

Unity of Aran has its roots in Aranese nationalist Es Terçons ("The Thirds", referring to Aranese traditional administrative subdivisions) founded in 1978 to safeguard a special status for the comarca in the 1979 Statute of Autonomy and the nascent UA has opposed the aspirations of Catalan nationalism and acted jointly with affiliated Aranese Nationalist Party (Partit Nacionalista Aranés) that struggles for a separate autonomous community status. The party is chaired by Francés Xavier Boya Alòs from Les and gained 46.13% of the votes at the General Council elections in 2007.

== Electoral performance ==
=== General Council of Aran ===
Election	Votes	%	Seats	+/–	Government
1991	1,478	46.2 (#2)	6 / 13	6	Opposition
1995	1,305	30.4 (#2)	4 / 13	2	Opposition
1999	1,311	29.8 (#2)	2 / 13	2	Opposition
2003	1,895	39.1 (#2)	5 / 13	3	Opposition
2007	2,198	46.1 (#1)	6 / 13	1	Government
2011	1,965	41.1 (#2)	5 / 13	1	Opposition
2015	2,193	45.7 (#2)	5 / 13	0	Opposition
2019	2,527	49.7 (#1)	9 / 13	4	Government
2023	2,279	49.1 (#1)	9 / 13	0	Government
