= Aranese Democratic Convergence =

Aranese Democratic Convergence-Aranese Nationalist Party Convergéncia Democratica Aranesa-Partit Nacionalista Aranès
- President: Carlos Barrera Sánchez
- Founded: 30 March 1995
- Ideology: Liberalism; Aranese autonomy Occitan nationalism
- Political position: Centre-right
- National affiliation: Democratic Convergence of Catalonia (until 2016)
- Conselh Generau d'Aran: 4 / 13
- Town councillors in Val d'Aran: 17 / 59

Website
- www.convergencia-aranesa.oc

Aranese Democratic Convergence (Aranese: Convergéncia Democratica Aranesa, formerly Convergéncia Democratica Aranesa – Partit Nacionalista Aranés) is a political party in Val d'Aran that formed the Aranese section of CDC. CDA is, along with Unity of Aran, one of the two major parties of the comarca that contest elections for the Aranese General Council. It had been led for 30 years by Josep Luís Boya until Carlos Barrera Sánchez was elected as the new chairman in 2008. The party gained 42.6% of the votes at the General Council elections in 2007. Maria Pilar Busquets became the 1st Sindic d'Aran in 1991.
