= Val d'Aran =

Coordinates: 42°43′21″N 0°50′14″E

Aran
- Unique territorial entity
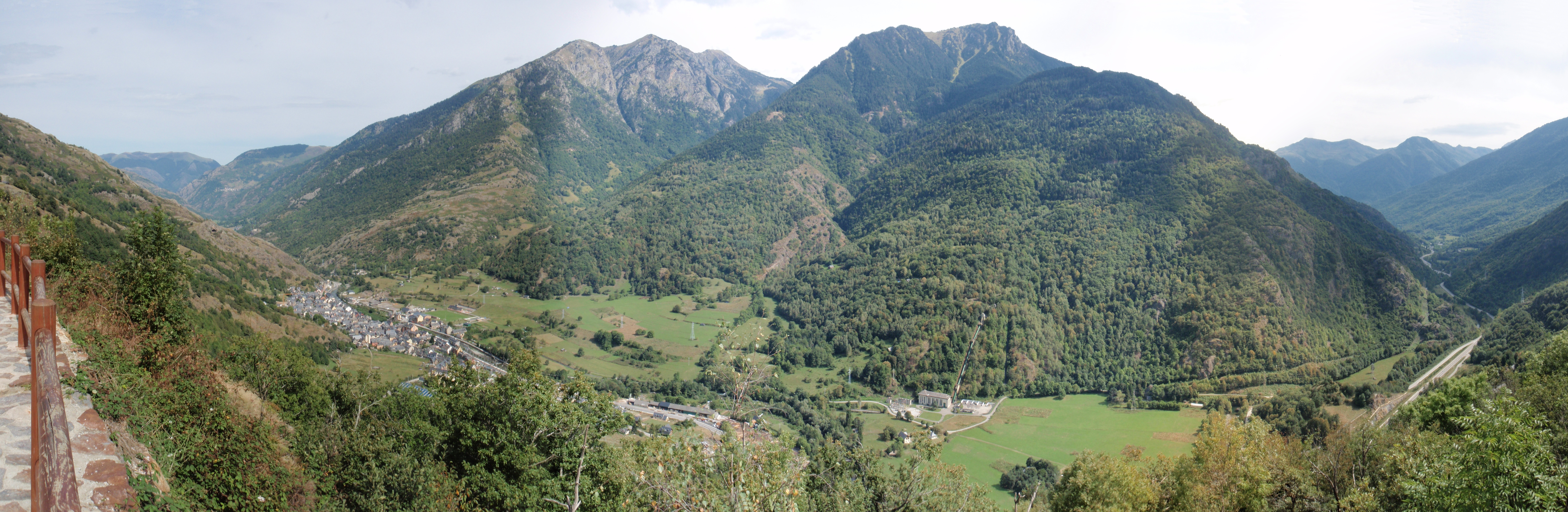
- Panorama of Aran, with Bossòst to the left

- Flag Coat of arms
- Anthem: Montanhes araneses (Occitan) "Aranese mountains"
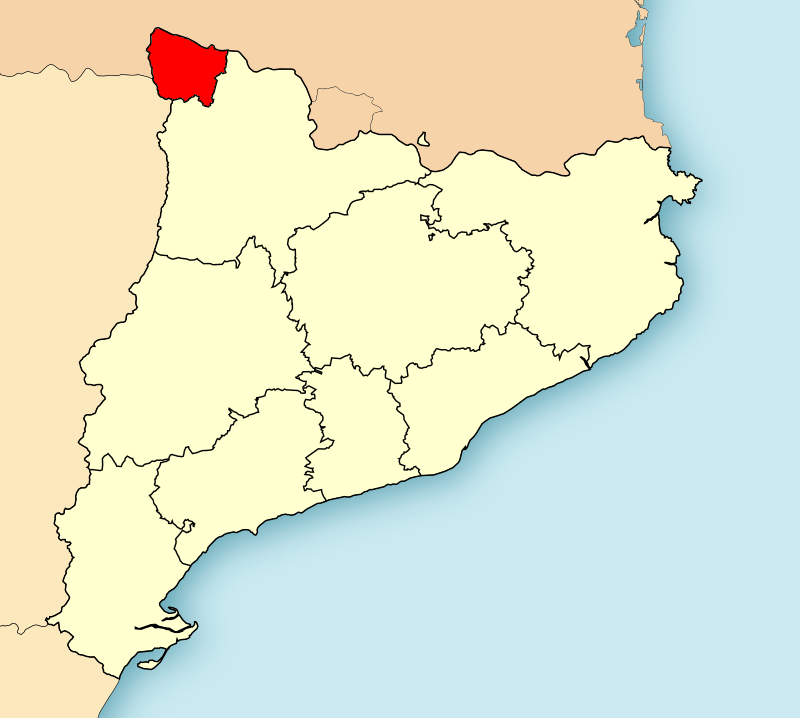
- Location of Aran (red) in Catalonia
- Country: Spain
- Autonomous community: Catalonia
- Region: N/A
- Area: Alt Pirineu i Aran
- Province: Lleida
- Capital: Vielha e Mijaran
- Municipalities: List: Arres, Bausen, Bossòst, Es Bòrdes, Canejan, Les, Naut Aran, Vielha e Mijaran, Vilamòs

Government
  - Body: Conselh Generau d'Aran
  - Síndic d'Aran: Maria Vergés Pérez (UA-PSC)

Area
  - Total: 633.5 km^{2} (244.6 sq mi)

Population (2014)
  - Total: 9,993
  - Density: 15.77/km^{2} (40.86/sq mi)
- Demonyms: English: Aranese; Occitan: aranés (m), aranesa (f)
- Time zone: UTC+1 (CET)
  - Summer (DST): UTC+2 (CEST)
- Largest municipality: Vielha e Mijaran
- Official languages: Occitan (Aranese); Catalan; Spanish
- Website: Conselh Generau d'Aran

Aran (Occitan: [aˈɾan]; Catalan: [əˈɾan]; Spanish: [aˈɾan]; often known as the Aran Valley, or Val d'Aran in Aranese Occitan; in other forms of Occitan: Vath d'Aran or Vau d'Aran; Catalan: Vall d'Aran; Spanish: Valle de Arán) is an autonomous administrative entity (formerly considered a comarca) in northwest Catalonia, Spain, consisting of 620.47 square kilometres (239.56 mi^{2}) in area, located in the Pyrenees mountains, in the Alt Pirineu i Aran region and in the province of Lleida. The capital is Vielha e Mijaran.

This valley constitutes the only contiguous part of Catalonia located on the northern side of the Pyrenees. Hence, this valley holds the only Catalan rivers to flow into the Atlantic Ocean (for the same reason, the region is characterized by an Atlantic climate, instead of a Mediterranean one). The Garonne river flows through Aran from its source on the Pla de Beret (Beret Flat) near the Port de la Bonaigua. It is joined by the Joèu river (from the slopes of Aneto mountain) which passes underground at the Forau d'Aigualluts. It then reappears in the Val dera Artiga de Lin before reaching the Aran valley, then through France and eventually to the Atlantic Ocean. The Noguera Pallaresa river, whose source is only a hundred meters from that of the Garonne, flows the opposite way towards the Mediterranean.

Aran borders France on the north, the Autonomous Community of Aragon to the west and the Catalan comarques of Alta Ribagorça to the south and Pallars Sobirà to the east. Its capital, Vielha e Mijaran, has 5,474 inhabitants (2014). The entire population of the valley is about 9,991 (2014). As of 2001, a plurality of people in Aran spoke Spanish (38.78%) as their native language, followed by Aranese (34.19%), then Catalan (19.45%) with 7.56% having a different native language. While Aranese is the mother tongue of 62.87% of people born in the region, it is less frequent among residents born outside the valley.

== History ==
In 1313, James II of Aragon granted administrative and political autonomy to the Aran Valley, the legal details of which are described in a Latin manuscript called the Querimonia. The devolution of power was a reward for the Aranese pledging allegiance to James II in a dispute with the kingdoms of France and Mallorca over control of the valley. In 1411 the Valley was confirmed as part of the Principality of Catalonia by the Catalan parliament at the request of the Syndic of Aran himself. This status was upheld during the Nueva Planta decrees in 1707-1716, but suppressed in 1834 when the Valley was integrated into the new Province of Lleida, in the context of the establishment of the Spanish provinces at the beginning of the liberal state.

On 19 October 1944, Communist Party of Spain guerrillas invaded the valley in an attempt to bring about the fall of the Spanish dictatorship. They took control of several villages until October 27, 1944, but were forced to retreat back into France after Franco sent reinforcements to defend Vielha. Before the construction of the Vielha tunnel, opened in 1948, the Aran valley had no direct communication with the south side of the mountains during winter.

In 1987 it became an administrative comarca. In 1990 the special status of Aran within Catalonia was restored by the Parliament of Catalonia, reestablishing the Conselh Generau, granting it a degree of home rule and declaring Occitan as official language. In 2015 the Catalan Parliament passed a new law which increased the powers of the Conselh Generau and recognized Aran as an "Occitan national reality".

The population of Val d'Aran has generally been opposed to the Catalan independence movement due to lack of a strong Catalan identity.

== Name and local language ==
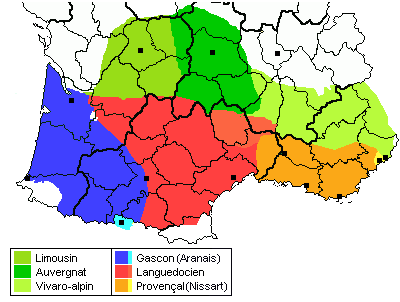
Map of southern France with the Occitan dialects, showcasing Aranese

Aranese is the standardized form of the local Gascon variety of the Occitan language. Aranese has been regularly taught at school since 1984. Like several other minority languages in Europe that recently faced decline, Aranese is experiencing a renaissance.

The name Aran comes from Basque haran, meaning valley. Maps and road signs in Spain use the name "era Val d'Aran" to refer to the valley, where era is the Aranese singular feminine article. The same practice goes for all towns and other locations in Aran, for example, the Aranese spelling Vielha is used instead of Catalan and Spanish Viella to refer to the capital of Aran.

Basque toponyms reveal that Basque was spoken further east along the Pyrenees than today. The growing influence of Latin began to drive Basque out after the turn of the first millennium.

== Government and economy ==
Administratively, Aran is a "unique territorial entity" roughly equivalent to a comarca with additional powers, and informally referred to as a comarca. This status was most recently formalised in February 2015. The area is divided into six administrative divisions called terçons (meaning "thirds", as there were formerly three divisions). The current arrangement of the divisions dates from the 15th century. Since 1991, Aran has an autonomous government called the Conselh Generau d'Aran (Occitan: General Council of Aran), headed by the Síndic d'Aran.

The major political parties are the Unity of Aran - Aranese Nationalist Party (the local chapter of the Socialists' Party of Catalonia), the Aranese Democratic Convergence (the local chapter of the (Democratic Convergence of Catalonia). The Occitan Republican Left party was founded in 2008.

The main economic activity in the valley is tourism; from the ski resorts in the winter and from other tourist activity in the summer. Other primary sectors of the economy include forest products, cattle ranching and agriculture, all of which have become progressively less important since the opening of ski resorts.

=== Municipalities ===
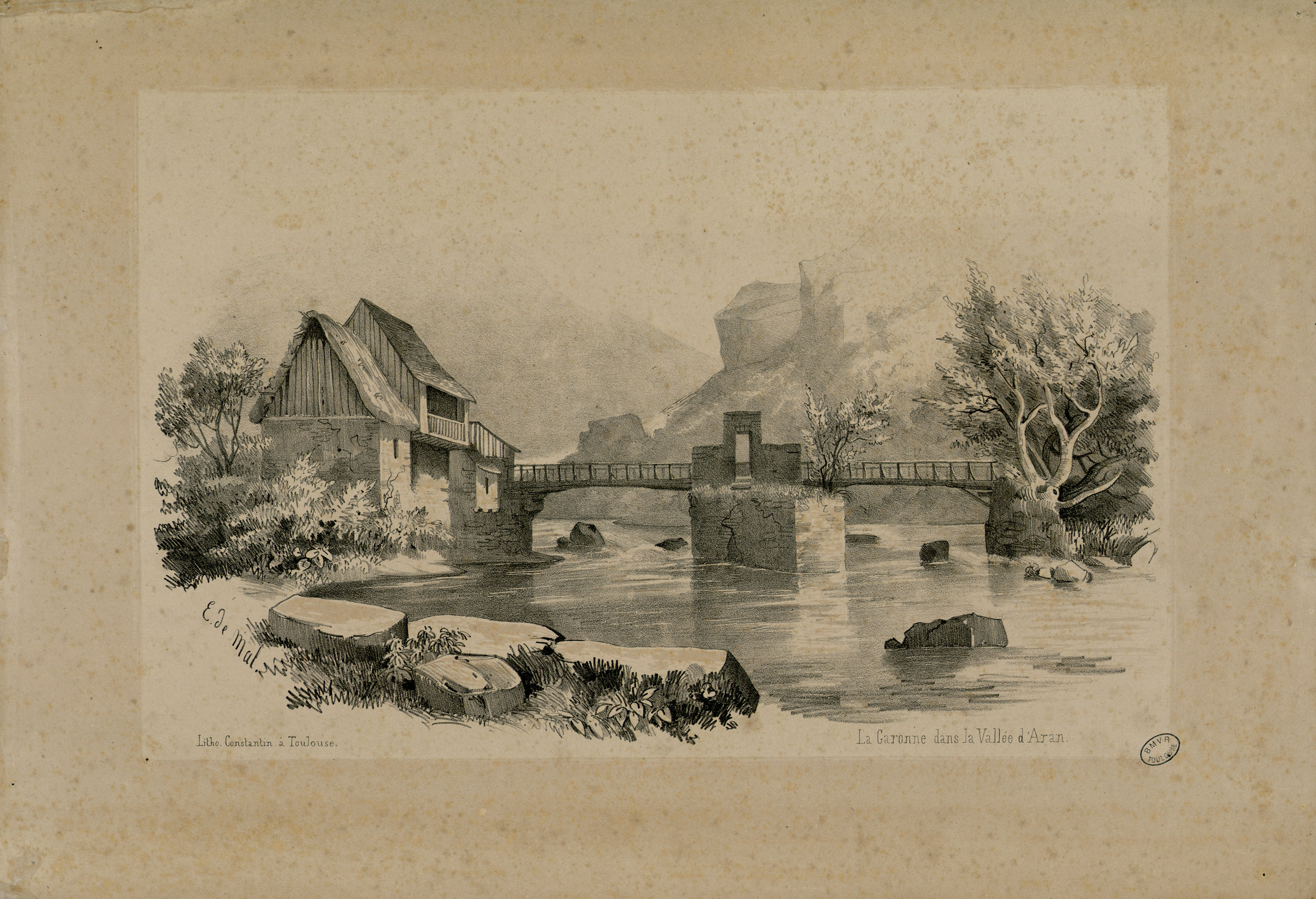
Garonne in Val d'Aran near 1840 by Eugène de Malbos.

Municipality	Population (2014)	Area km^{2}
Arres	73	11.6
Bausen	49	17.7
Es Bòrdes	234	21.4
Bossòst	1,140	28.2
Canejan	102	48.3
Les	968	23.4
Naut Aran	1,782	255.8
Vielha e Mijaran	5,474	211.7
Vilamòs	171	15.4
• Total: 9	9,993	633.5

== Fauna ==
Many native animals of Aran are in danger of extinction. There are programs to reintroduce and/or protect:

- Aran rock lizard (Lacerta aranica)
- Bearded vulture (Gypaetus barbatus)
- Brown bear (Ursus arctos)
- Rock ptarmigan (Lagopus mutus)
