= Terçon =

The current six Aranese terçons and the municipal boundaries

The terçons (Aranese Occitan: terçon; Catalan: terçó) form the geographical subdivision of the Aran Valley, in Catalonia. It was in use from the granting of the Querimonia, in 1313, until its abolition in 1833 with the Spanish provincial division. It was then traditionally maintained in common use as an identity element until its restoration in 1990 as a constituency for the General Council of Aran.

== History ==
Initially there were three terçons, hence the name (English: "thirds"), under the names of Garòs, Vielha and Bossòst. These corresponded to the three geographical areas of the valley: Naut Aran (upper Aran), Mijaran (central Aran) and Baish Aran (lower Aran). In the 16th century each terçon was subdivided into two sesterçons, which continued to be commonly called terçons:

- Garòs: Arties (today Arties e Garòs) and Pujòlo.
- Vielha: Marcatosa and Castièro.
- Bossòst: Irissa and Quate Lòcs.

The Querimonia, granted by James the Just in 1313, established the General Council of Aran as its own governing body made up of representatives from each terçon. The Nueva Planta decrees did not abolish the Aranese furs, but its autonomy was significantly reduced. With the provincial division of 1833, the territory was integrated into the Spanish province of Lleida, with the subsequent suppression of the General Council and the replacement of terçons by municipalities.

Despite no longer having an administrative function, the terçons continued to be maintained in a traditional way among the inhabitants of the valley as an identity mark. In 1977, during the Spanish Transition, an association with the name of Es Terçons was set up to defend the Aranese interests in the Statute of Autonomy of Catalonia of 1979.

== Administration ==
The law on the Aran Valley's special government restored the traditional administrative structure, which was superimposed on the municipal structure. In the elections to the General Council, each terçon elects their councillors as well. With a total of 13, each terçon is assigned a number of councillors following the number of inhabitants.

Terçon	Municipalities	Towns	Councillors
Castièro (Occitan: [kasˈtjɛɾu])	Vielha e Mijaran (south)	Vielha; Escunhau; Casarilh; Betren; Gausac; Casau	4
Marcatosa (Occitan: [maɾkaˈtu.za])	Vielha e Mijaran (north)	Vilac; Aubèrt; Betlan; Mont; Montcorbau; Arròs; Vila	1
Arties e Garòs (Occitan: [aɾˈti.es e ɣaˈɾɔs])	Naut Aran (south)	Arties; Garòs	2
Pujòlo (Occitan: [pyˈʒɔ.lu])	Naut Aran (north)	Tredòs; Bagergue; Salardú; Unha; Gessa	2
Irissa (Occitan: [iˈɾi.sa])	Vilamòs; Arres; Es Bòrdes		1
Quate Lòcs (Occitan: [ˈkwa.te ˈlɔks])	Bossòst; Les; Canejan; Bausen		3

== See also ==
- Vegueries
- Aran
