= Arros =

Arros is an Aquitanian placename that may refer to:

== River ==
- The Arros (river), one of the main tributaries of the Adour, in the Southwest of France

== Places ==
France

- Arros-de-Nay, a commune of the Pyrénées-Atlantiques department
- Asasp-Arros, a commune of the Pyrénées-Atlantiques department
- Larceveau-Arros-Cibits, a commune of the Pyrénées-Atlantiques department

Spain

- Arròs, village in Vielha e Mijaran, Spain
