= La Tuca =

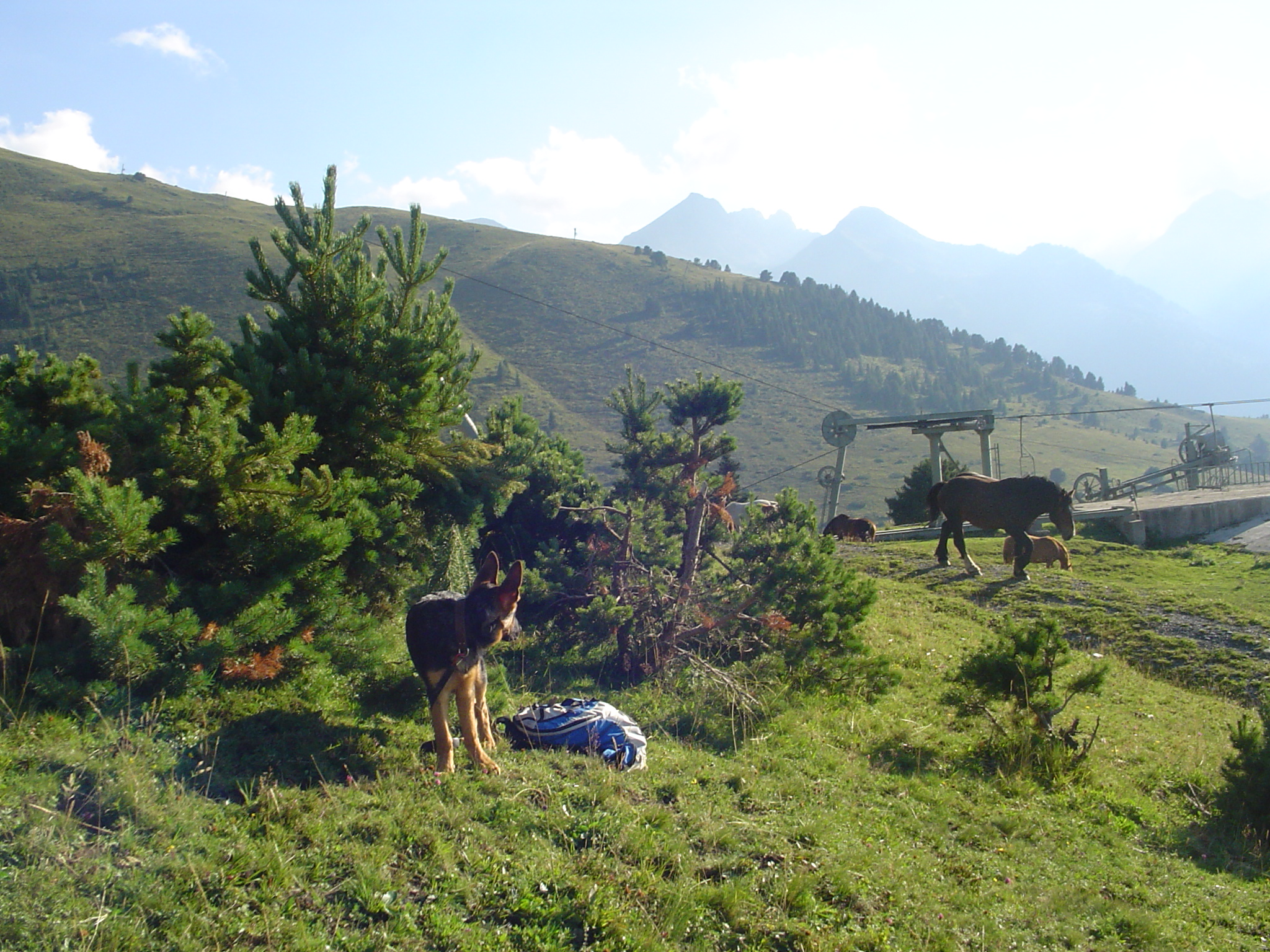
- La Tuca Ski Resort (August 2006)

- Location within Catalonia Location within Spain
- Nearest city: Vielha
- Coordinates: 42.67°N 0.8155°E

La Tuca was a ski resort in Betrén, a village in the municipality of Vielha e Mijaran, in the Aran Valley, Spain. It was open from 1972 to 1989.

As of 2009, there were plans for it to be reopened in 2011.
