= Naut Aran =

- Municipality
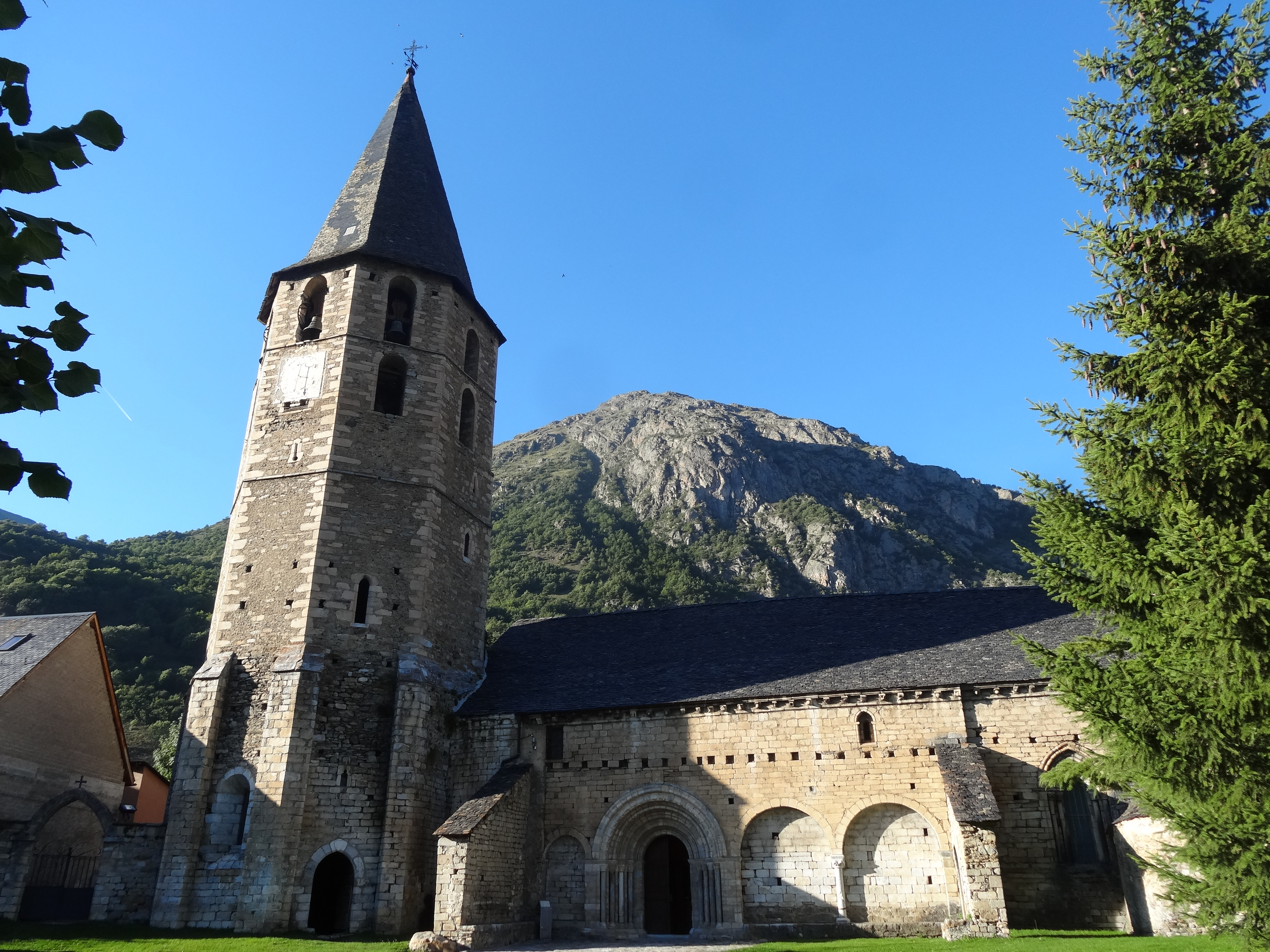
- Sant Andreu church, in Salardú

- Location in Aran

- Location in Catalonia
- Coordinates: 42°42′32″N 0°54′11″E
- Country: Spain
- Community: Catalonia
- Province: Lleida
- Entity: Aran
- Terçons: Arties e Garòs, Pujòlo

Government
  - Mayor: César Ruiz-Canela Nieto (2015) (CDA)

Area
  - Total: 255.8 km^{2} (98.8 sq mi)
- Elevation: 1,267 m (4,157 ft)

Population (2025-01-01)
  - Total: 1,902
  - Density: 7.435/km^{2} (19.26/sq mi)
- Website: www.nautaran.org

Naut Aran (Occitan pronunciation: [ˈnawt aˈɾan]) is a municipality in eastern Aran, Province of Lleida, Catalonia, Spain. It has a population of 1,902 (register office, 2025). It is located in the terçons of Arties e Garòs and Pujòlo.

It is the second largest municipality in Catalonia in terms of surface area (225.8 km^{2}, behind Tremp), and was created in 1967 by the merger of the municipalities of Arties, Salardú, Gessa, Tredòs and Bagergue: the former municipalities retain some privileges as "decentralised municipal entities" (entitats municipals descentralitzades, EMD). The name literally means "Upper Valley" in Aranese, and both the Garonne (Garona) and the Noguera Pallaresa have their sources on the territory of the municipality. The town hall is in Salardú. The municipality is linked to Vielha by the C-28 road, which continues to Alt Àneu over the Port de la Bonaigua (2072 m). This road, the higher stretches of which are impassable in winter, was the only route between the Aran Valley and the rest of Spain before the opening of the Vielha tunnel in 1948.

== Economy ==
The local economy is based almost entirely on tourism and winter sports. The ski resort of Vaquèira-Beret is one of the largest in the Pyrenees. A number of local churches have been classified as historic-artistic monuments:

- Church of Sant Andreu de Salardú, which houses a thirteenth-century sculpture of Christ (el Crist de Salardú)
- Church of Santa Maria, in Arties
- Church of Santa Eulària d'Unha (12th century)

== Demography ==
Population figures from before 1967 are the totals for the five municipalities which combined to form Naut Aran.

1900	1930	1950	1970	1986	2007
1169	1079	1173	881	1146	1716

== Subdivisions ==
The municipality is composed of nine distinct settlements:

- Arties (445)
- Bagergue (65)
- Garòs (160), in the EMD of Arties e Garòs
- Gessa (127)
- Montgarri (1)
- Salardú (367)
- Tredòs (150)
- Unha (75), in the EMD of Tredòs e Unha
- Vaquèira (108)
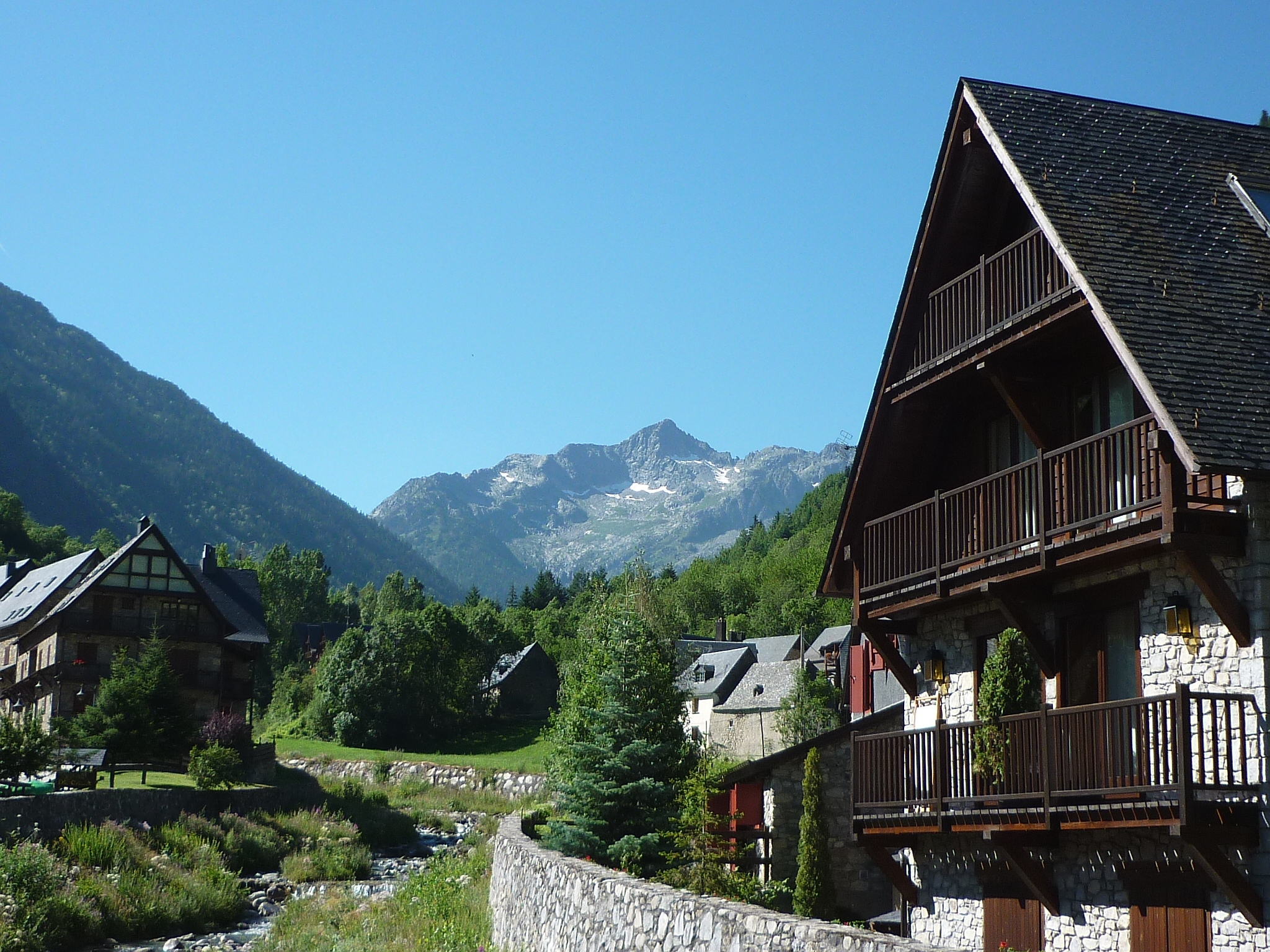
Arties

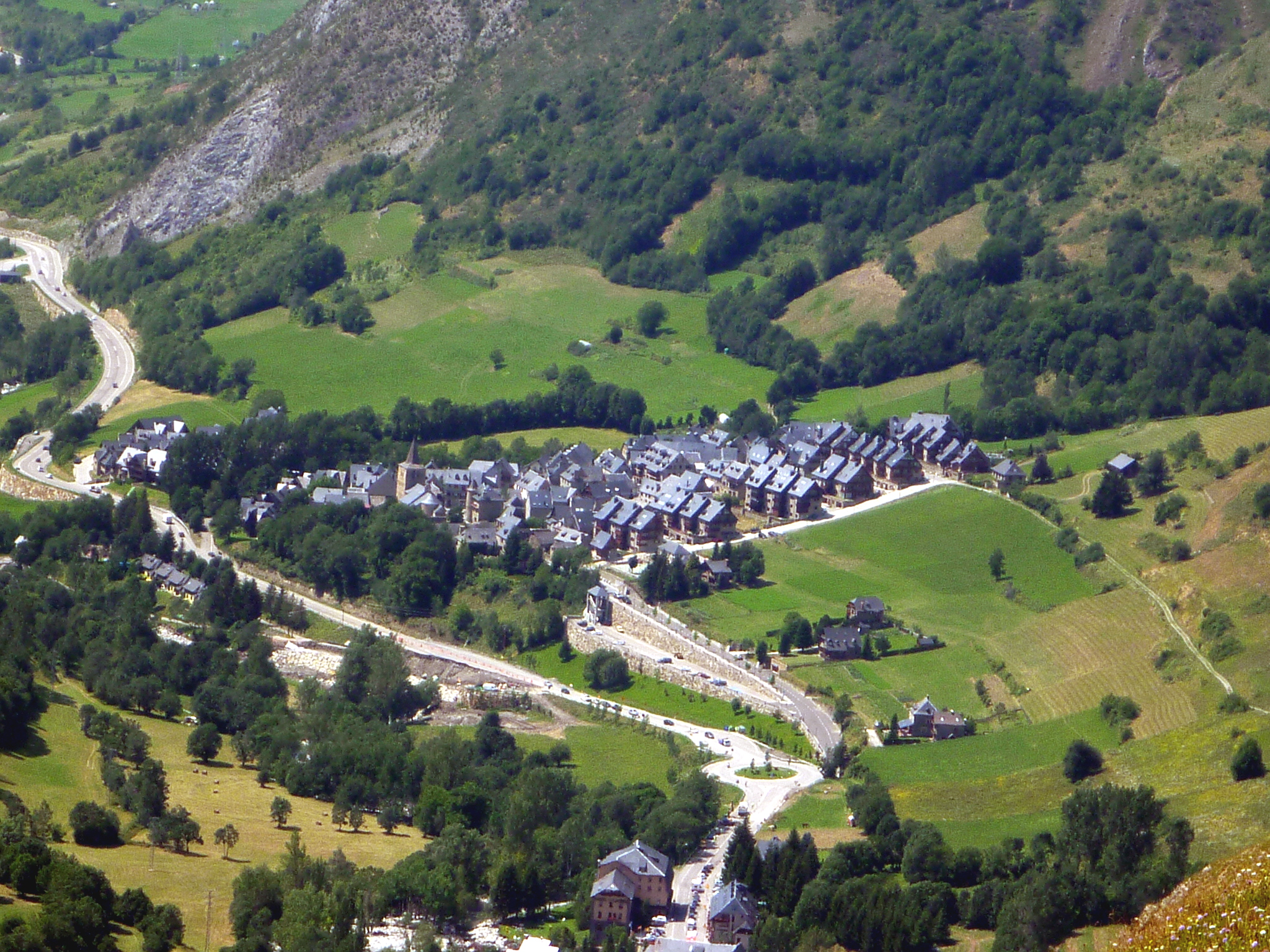
Gessa

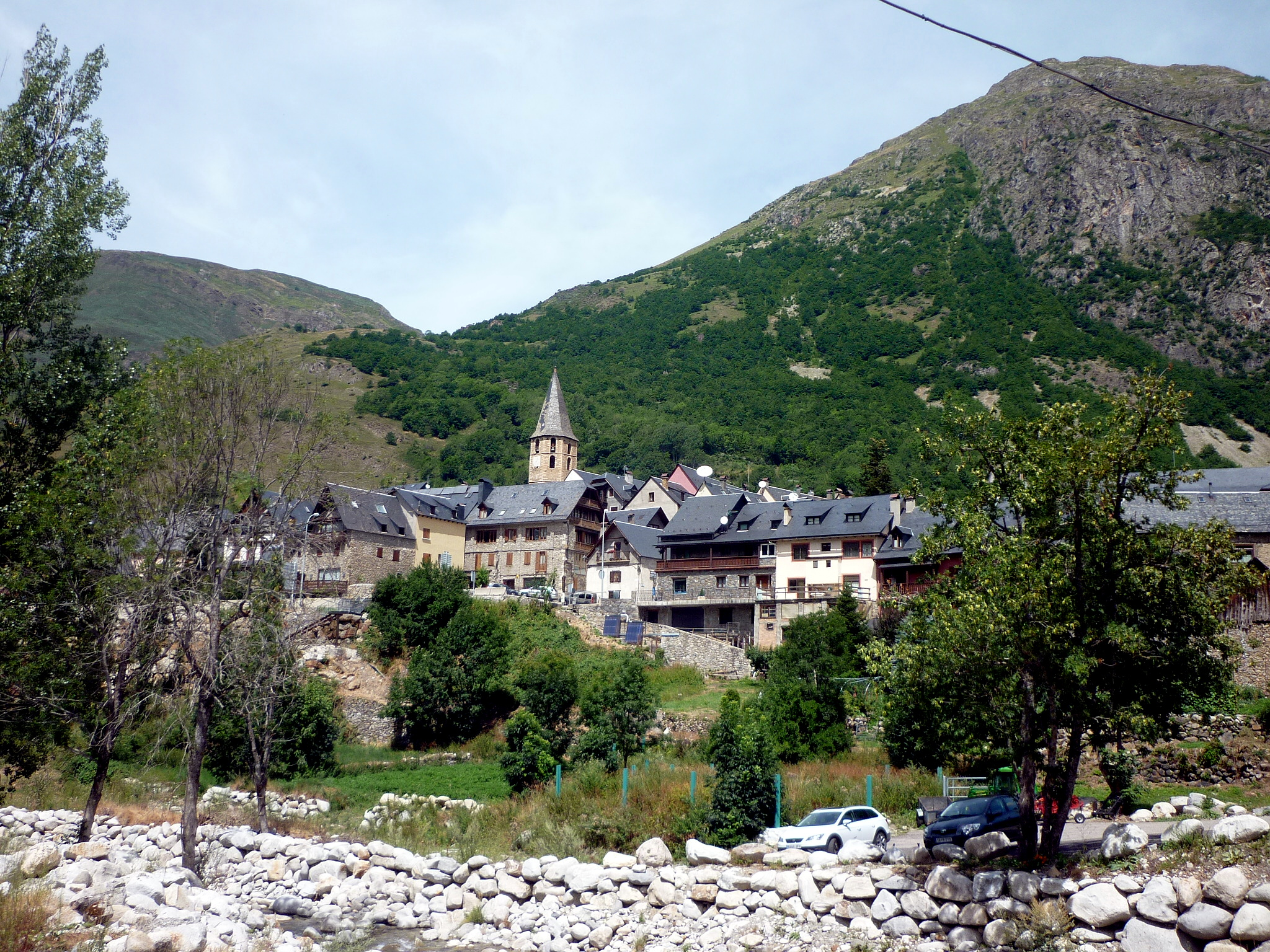
Salardú

== Notes ==
1. Entitats municipals descentralitzades are governed by the Llei Municipal i de Règim Local de Catalunya (8/1987 de 15 d'abril de 1987). They are known as entidades locales menores in Castilian (also entitats locals menors in Catalan the Valencian Community and the Balearic Islands).
