= Aubèrt =

- Village
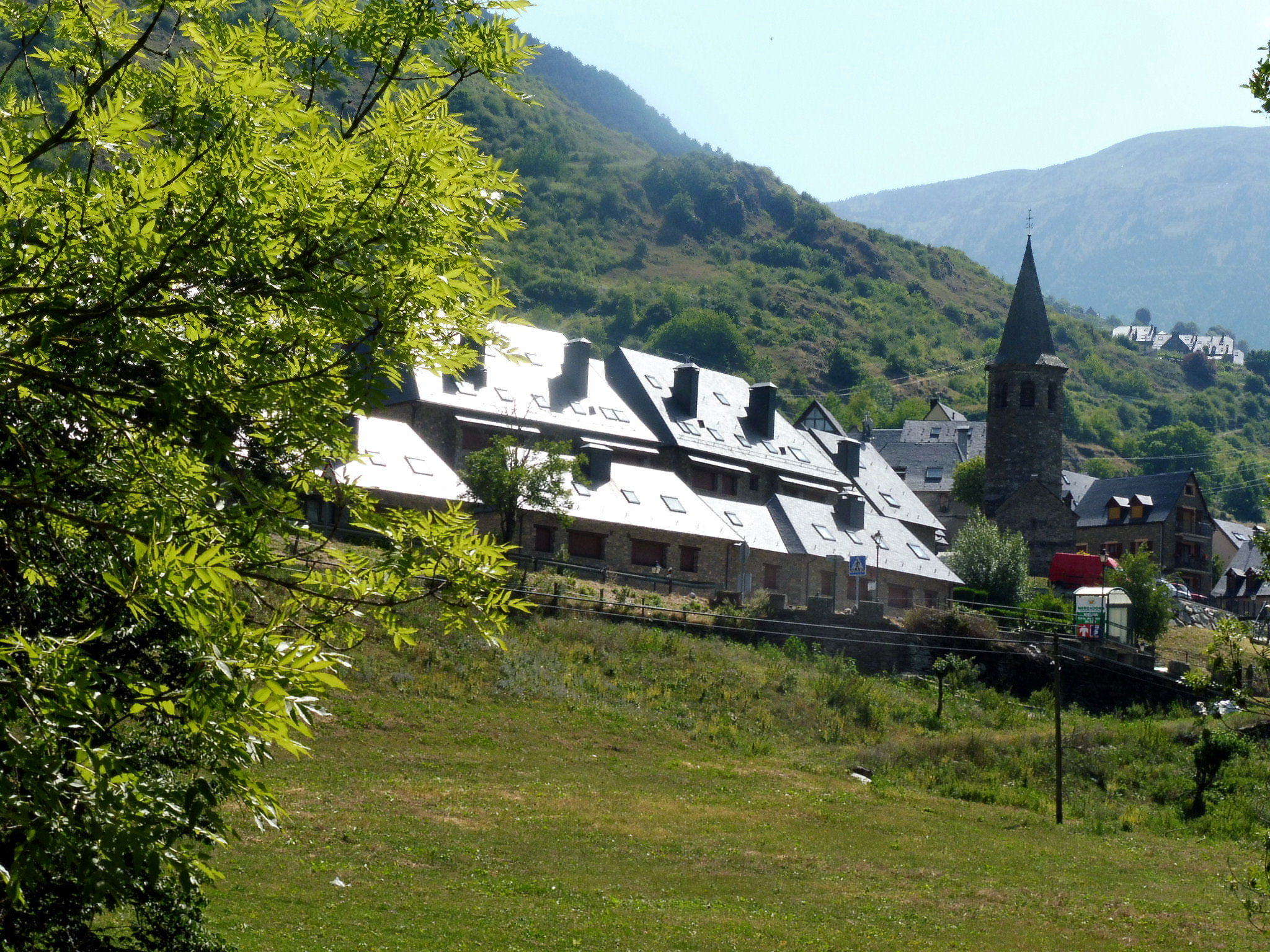

- Location in Catalonia
- Coordinates: 42°43′52″N 0°46′41″E
- Country: Spain
- Community: Catalonia
- Province: Lleida
- Special division: Val d'Aran
- Municipality: Vielha e Mijaran
- Elevation: 920 m (3,020 ft)

Population (2016)
  - Total: 189
- Postal code: 25537
- Climate: Cfb

Aubèrt (Occitan pronunciation: [awˈβɛɾ]) is a population entity that belongs to the municipality of Vielha e Mijaran (Val d'Aran), Spain. The village is located 903 meters and is due to the N-230 road from Vielha to France, 2 kilometers away from the municipality, Vielha. The set is a work included in the Inventory of the Architectural Heritage of Catalonia.

The town of Aubèrt, which was part of the old town of Betlan, is located 912 meters high, on the right side of the Garonne, near the N-230 road, 4 km from Vielha. It is presided over by the church of the Mare de Déu del Roser, a Romanesque building (12th century) with a camapanarde tower erected in the 16th century. On the outskirts, near the cemetery, there is the Romanesque parish church of Sant Martí (13th century), which was one of the old monasteries of Sant Agustí, today disappeared.
