= Montgarri =

- Locality
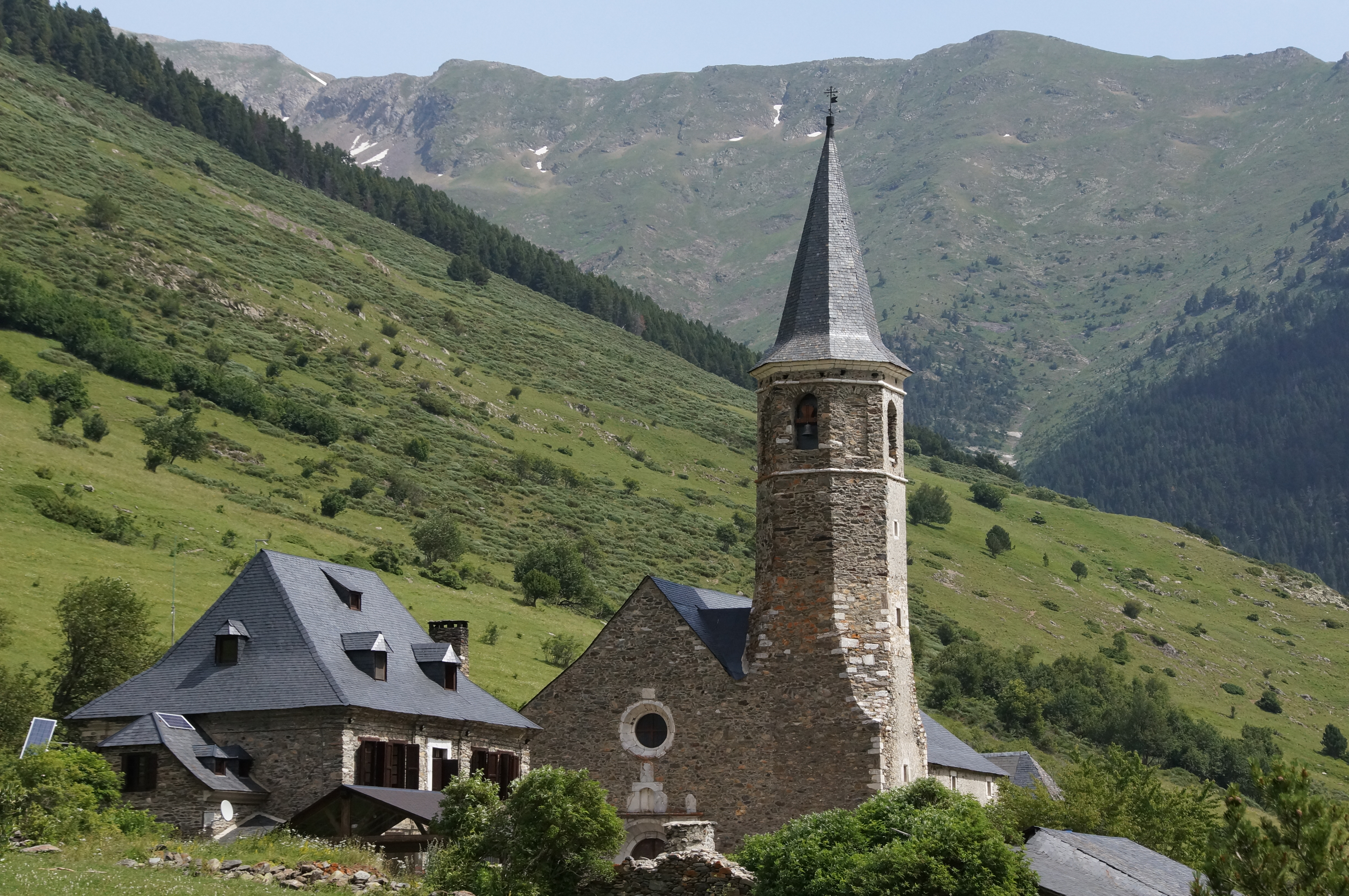

- Location within Province of Lleida Location within Catalonia Location within Spain
- Coordinates: 42°45′34″N 0°59′41″E
- Country: Spain
- Community: Catalonia
- Province: Lleida
- Municipality: Naut Aran

Population
  - Total: 4

Montgarri (Occitan pronunciation: [muŋˈgari]) is a hamlet located in the municipality of Naut Aran, in the Province of Lleida, Catalonia, Spain. As of 2020, it has a population of 4.

== Geography ==
Montgarri is located 190km north-northeast of Lleida, at an elevation of 1645 meters (5,397 feet).
