= Canejan =

- Municipality
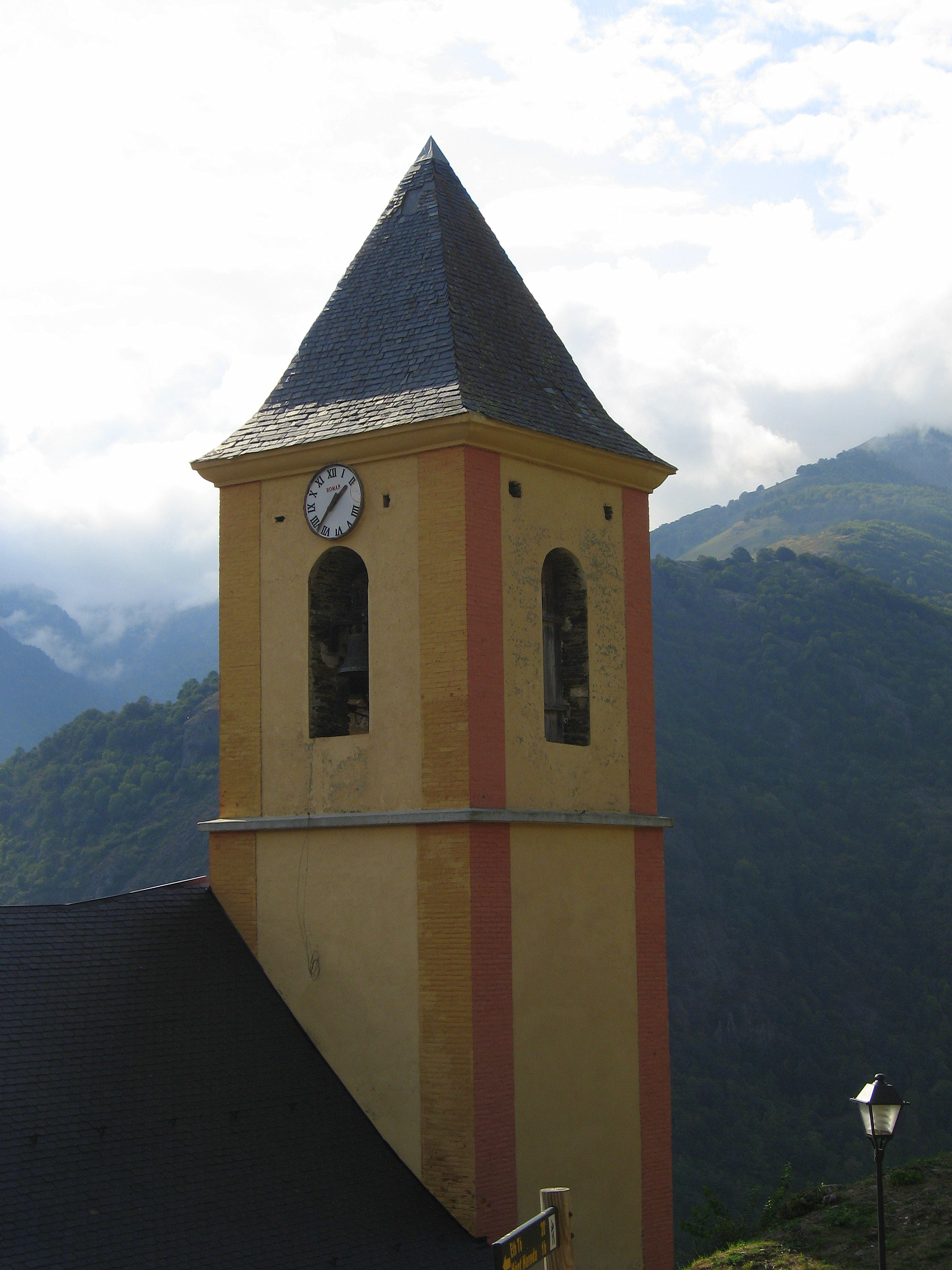
- Church of Canejan

- Coat of arms

- Location in Aran

- Location in Catalonia
- Coordinates: 42.838°N 0.740°E
- Country: Spain
- Community: Catalonia
- Province: Lleida
- Entity: Aran
- Terçon: Quate Lòcs

Government
  - Mayor: Juan Carlos Lastera Alcalde (2015) (UA)

Area
  - Total: 48.3 km^{2} (18.6 sq mi)

Population (2025-01-01)
  - Total: 95
  - Density: 2.0/km^{2} (5.1/sq mi)
- Website: www.canejan.org

Canejan (Occitan pronunciation: [kaneˈʒan]) is a municipality in northern Aran, Province of Lleida, Catalonia, Spain. It has a population of 95 (register office, 2025). It is located in the terçon of Quate Lòcs.
