= Mont (Vielha e Mijaran) =

- Locality
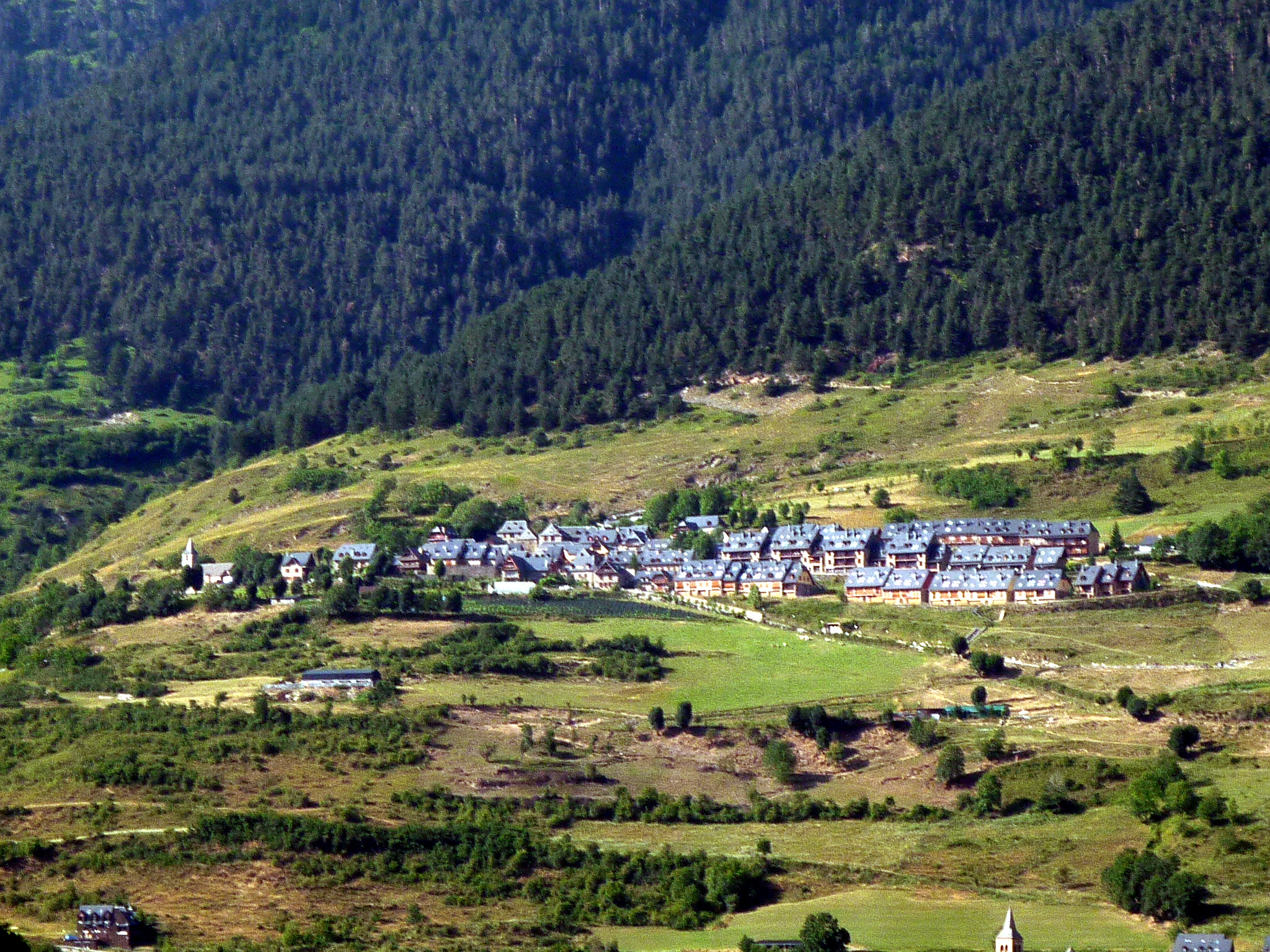

- Location within Province of Lleida Location within Catalonia Location within Spain
- Coordinates: 42°43′38″N 0°47′47″E
- Country: Spain
- Community: Catalonia
- Province: Lleida
- Municipality: Vielha e Mijaran
- Elevation: 1,222 m (4,009 ft)

Population
  - Total: 78

Mont (Occitan pronunciation: [ˈmun]) is a locality located in the municipality of Vielha e Mijaran, in Province of Lleida province, Catalonia, Spain. As of 2020, it had a population of 78.

== Geography ==
Mont is located 167km north of Lleida.
