= Betren =

- village
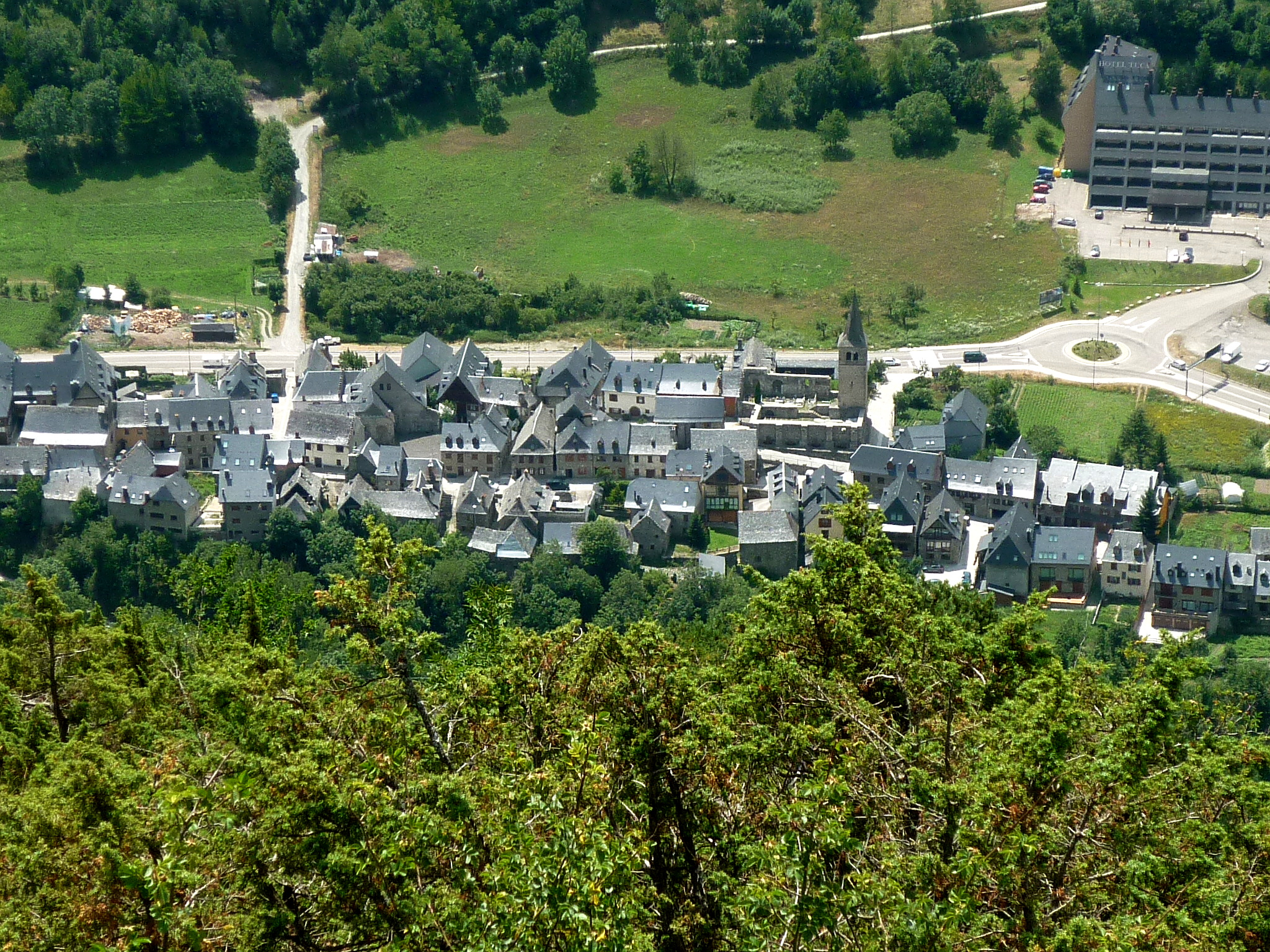

- Location in Catalonia
- Coordinates: 42°41′51″N 0°48′35″E
- Country: Spain
- Community: Catalonia
- Province: Lleida
- Special division: Val d'Aran
- Municipality: Vielha e Mijaran
- Elevation: 1,007 m (3,304 ft)

Population (2005)
  - Total: 483
- Postal code: 25539
- Climate: Cfb

Betren (Occitan pronunciation: [beˈtɾen]) is a village located in the municipality of Vielha e Mijaran, in the Val d'Aran.
