= Escunhau =

- Locality
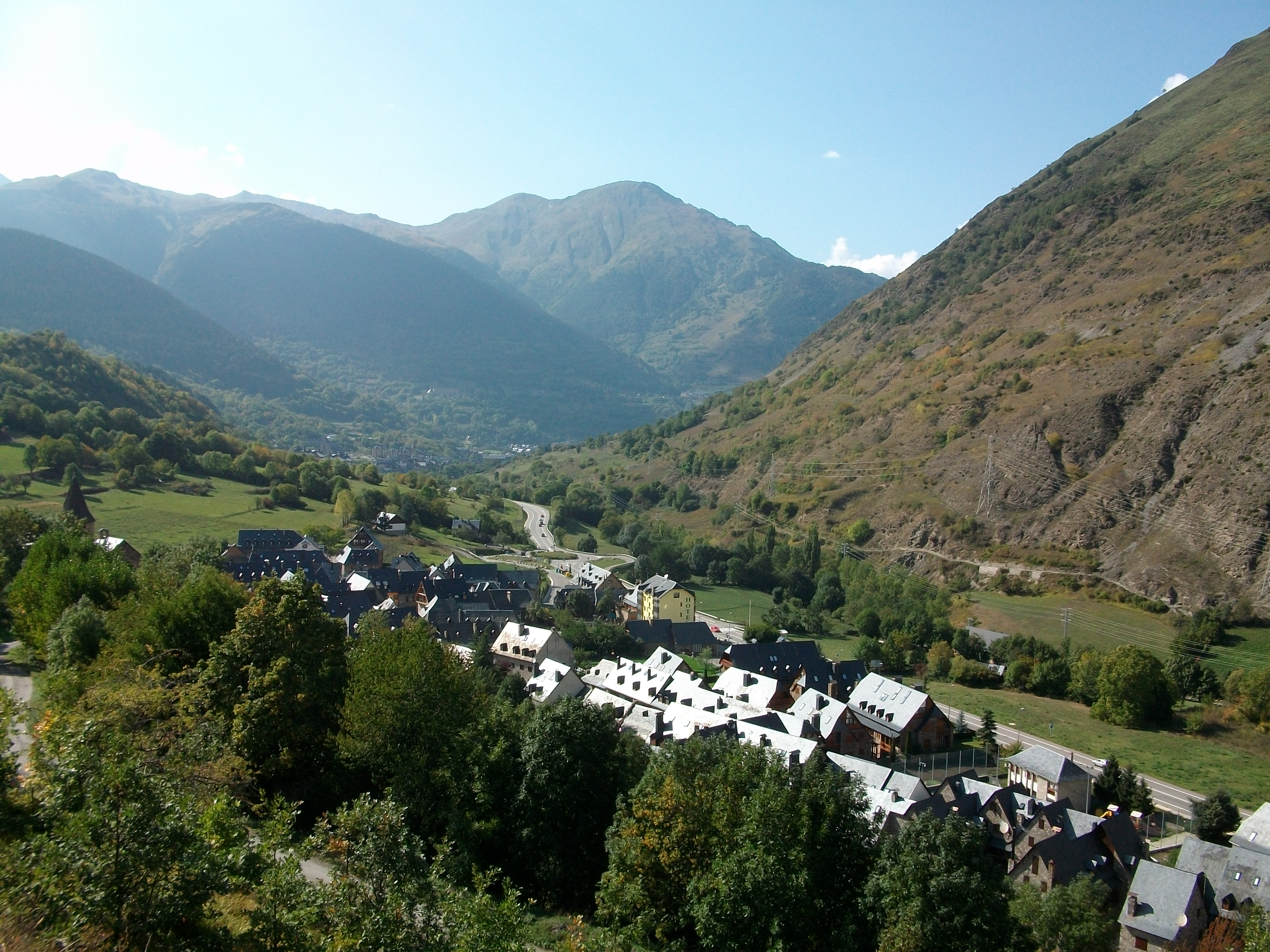

- Location within Province of Lleida Location within Catalonia Location within Spain
- Coordinates: 42°41′49″N 0°49′26″E
- Country: Spain
- Community: Catalonia
- Province: Lleida
- Municipality: Vielha e Mijaran
- Elevation: 1,037 m (3,402 ft)

Population
  - Total: 104

Escunhau (Occitan pronunciation: [eskyˈɲaw]) is a village located in the municipality of Vielha e Mijaran, in Province of Lleida province, Catalonia, Spain. As of 2020, it has a population of 104.

== Geography ==
Escunhau is located 164km north of Lleida.
