= Salardú =

- Locality
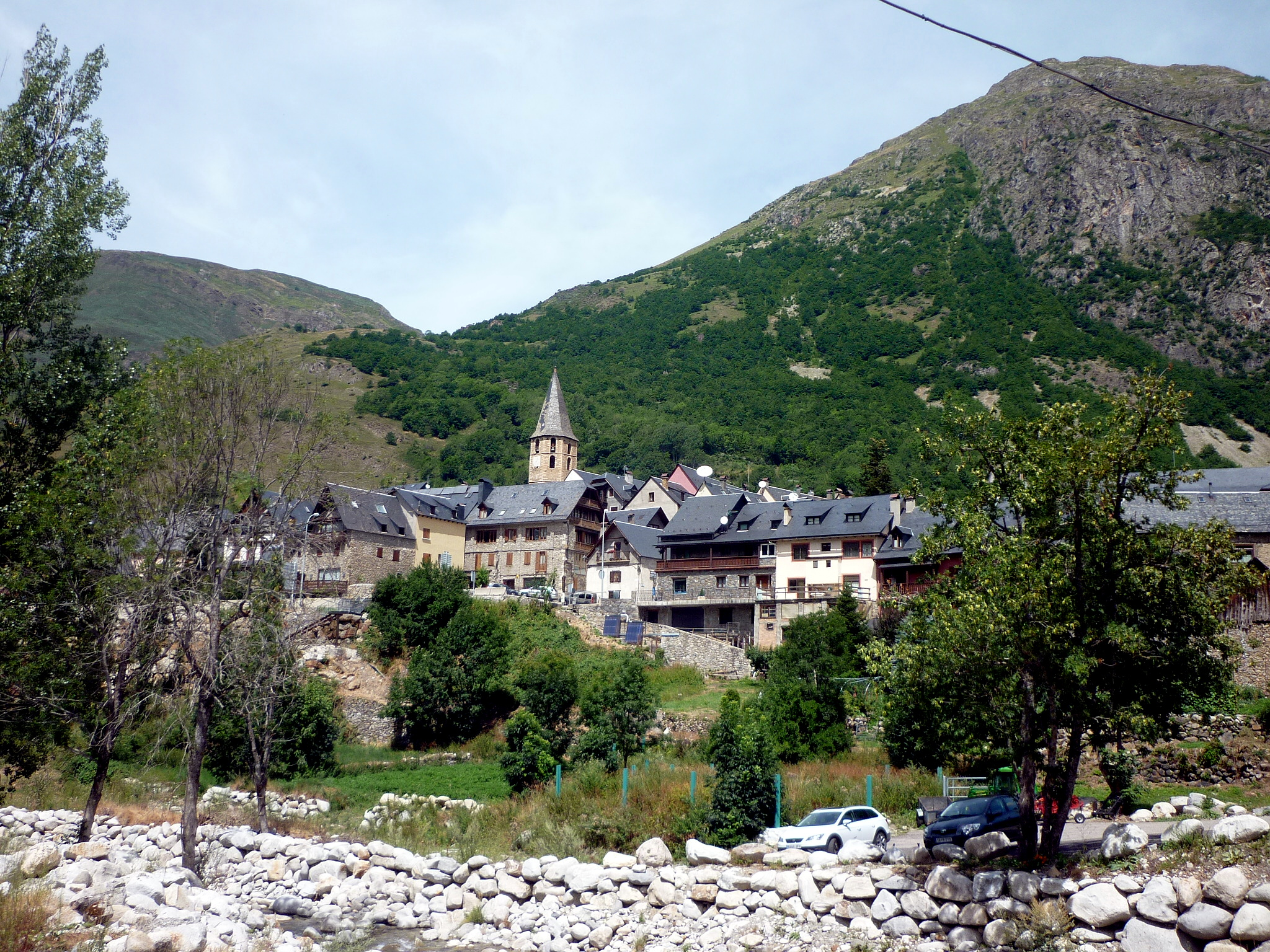

- Location within Province of Lleida Location within Catalonia Location within Spain
- Coordinates: 42°42′27″N 0°54′7″E
- Country: Spain
- Community: Catalonia
- Province: Lleida
- Municipality: Naut Aran
- Elevation: 1,270 m (4,170 ft)

Population
  - Total: 630

Salardú (Occitan pronunciation: [salaɾˈðy]) is a locality located in the municipality of Naut Aran, in Province of Lleida province, Catalonia, Spain. As of 2020, it has a population of 630. Salardú is the capital of the municipality of Naut Aran.

== Geography ==
Salardú is located 171km north-northeast of Lleida.
