= Montcorbau =

- Locality
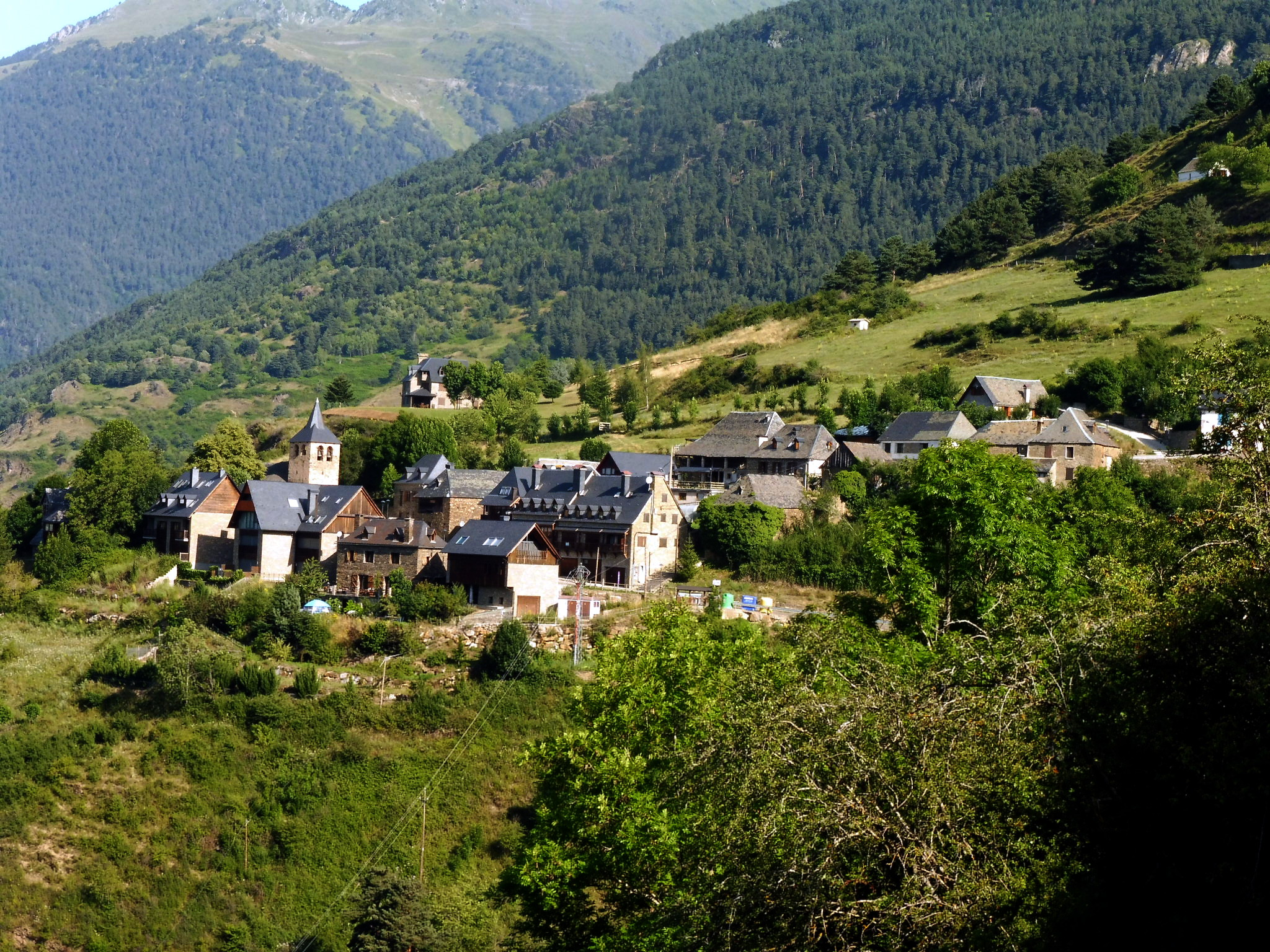

- Location within Province of Lleida Location within Catalonia Location within Spain
- Coordinates: 42°43′54″N 0°47′30″E
- Country: Spain
- Community: Catalonia
- Province: Lleida
- Municipality: Vielha e Mijaran
- Elevation: 1,213 m (3,980 ft)

Population
  - Total: 19

Montcorbau (Occitan pronunciation: [muŋkuɾˈβaw]) is a locality located in the municipality of Vielha e Mijaran, in Province of Lleida province, Catalonia, Spain. As of 2020, it has a population of 19.

== Geography ==
Montcorbau is located 167km north of Lleida.
