= Garós =

Garòs
- Locality
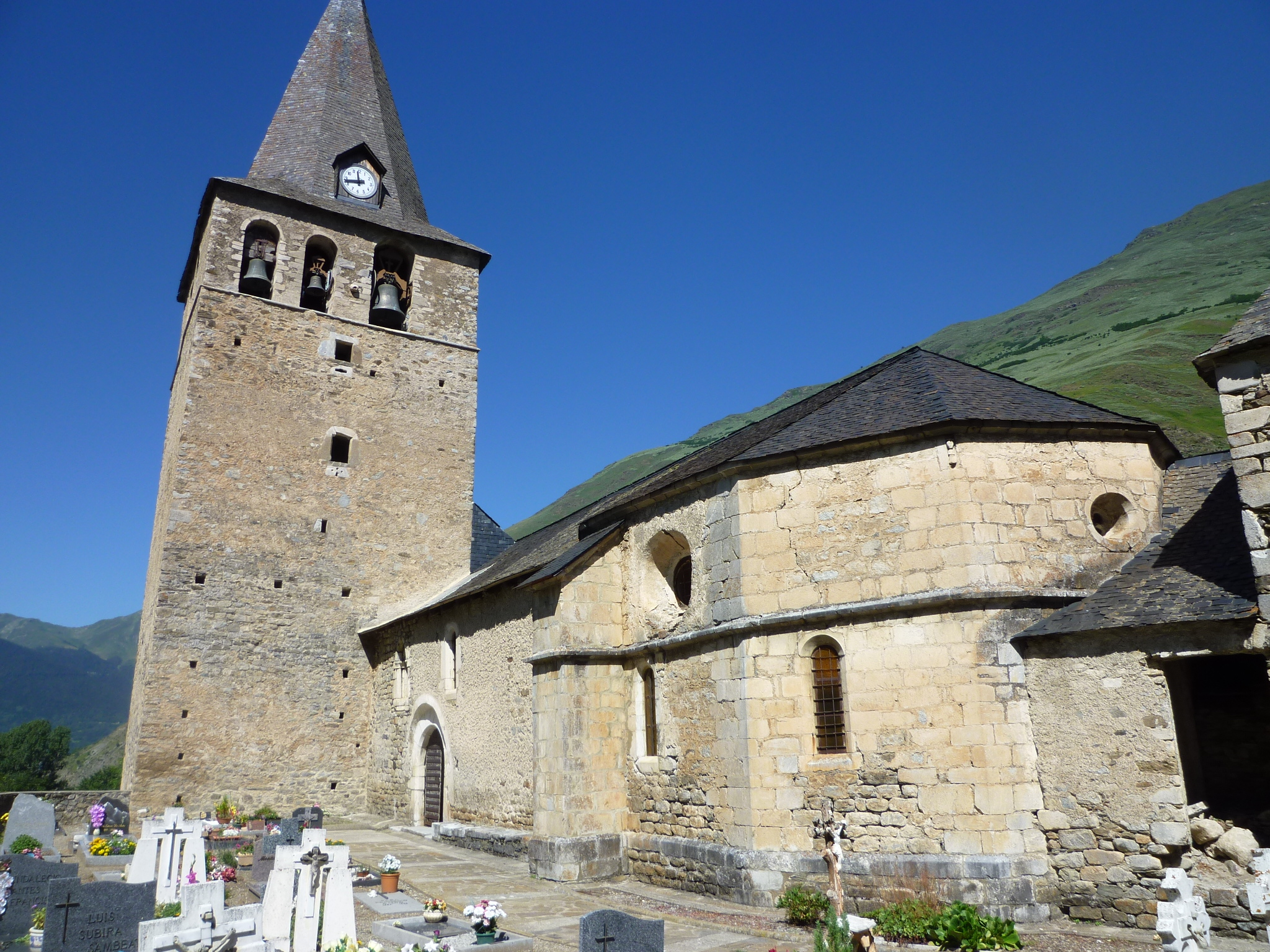

- Location within Province of Lleida Location within Catalonia Location within Spain
- Coordinates: 42°42′1″N 0°50′46″E
- Country: Spain
- Community: Catalonia
- Province: Lleida
- Municipality: Naut Aran
- Elevation: 1,117 m (3,665 ft)

Population
  - Total: 136

Garòs (Occitan pronunciation: [gaˈɾɔs]) is a locality located in the municipality of Naut Aran, in Province of Lleida province, Catalonia, Spain. As of 2020, it has a population of 136.

== Geography ==
Garós is located 166km north of Lleida.
