= Unha (Naut Aran) =

- Decentralized municipal entity
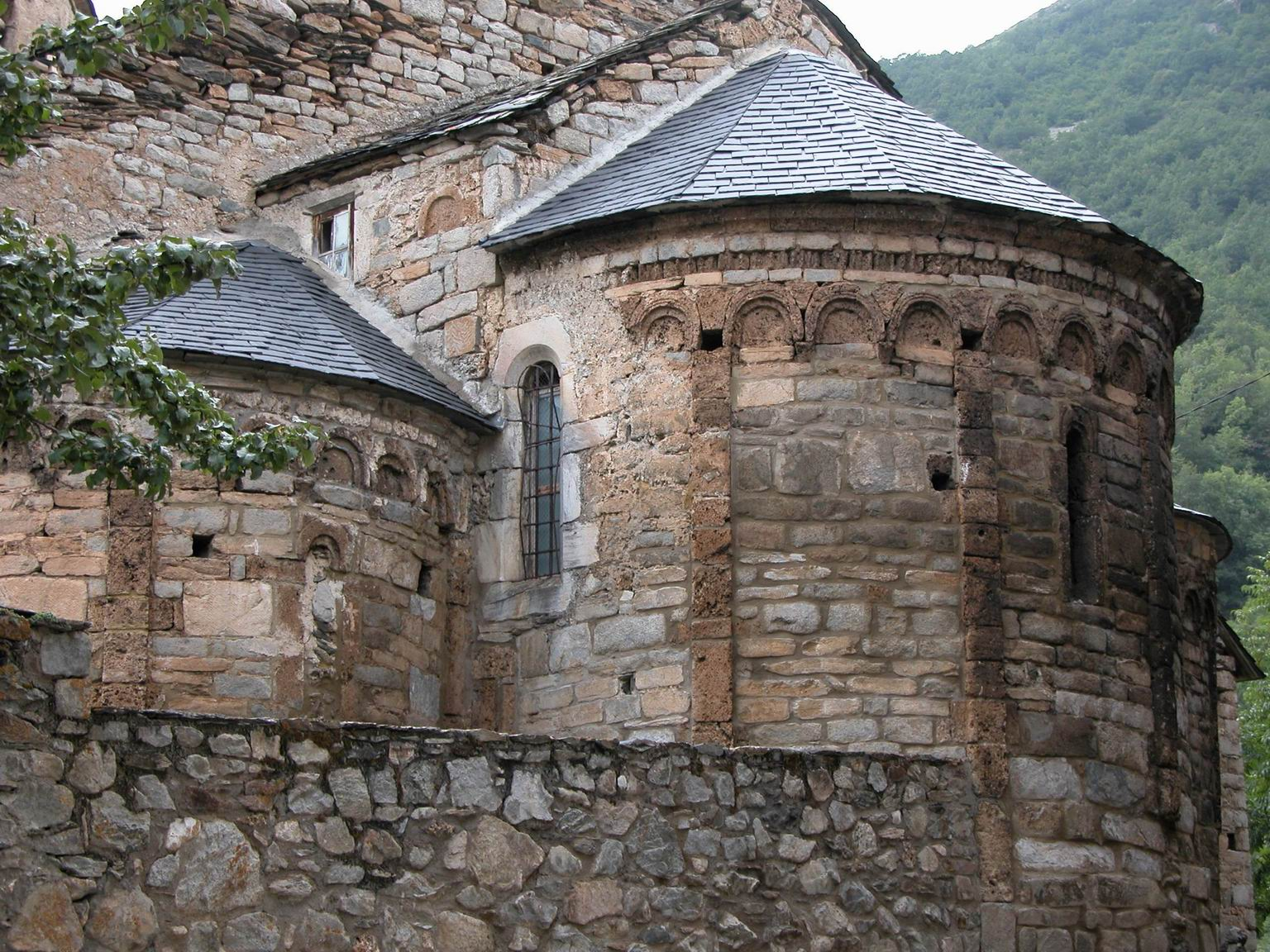

- Location within Province of Lleida Location within Catalonia Location within Spain
- Coordinates: 42°42′38″N 0°54′6″E
- Country: Spain
- Community: Catalonia
- Province: Lleida
- Municipality: Naut Aran
- Elevation: 1,293 m (4,242 ft)

Population
  - Total: 136

Unha (Occitan pronunciation: [ˈyɲa]) is a locality and decentralized municipal entity located in the municipality of Naut Aran, in Province of Lleida province, Catalonia, Spain. As of 2020, it has a population of 136.

== Geography ==
Unha is located 171km north-northeast of Lleida.
