= Casau =

- Decentralized municipal entity
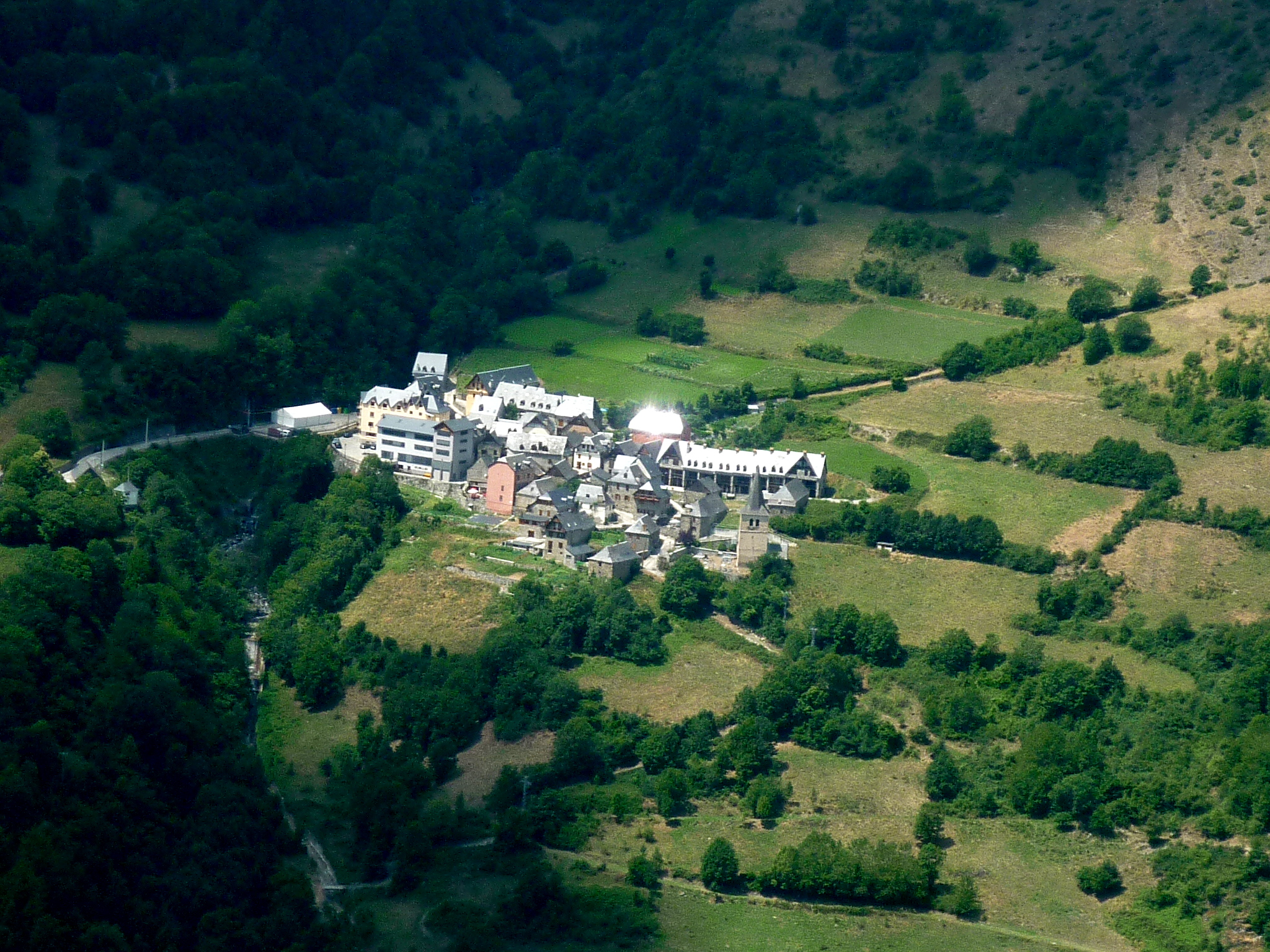

- Location within Province of Lleida Location within Catalonia Location within Spain
- Coordinates: 42°42′21″N 0°47′7″E
- Country: Spain
- Community: Catalonia
- Province: Lleida
- Municipality: Vielha e Mijaran
- Elevation: 1,130 m (3,710 ft)

Population
  - Total: 68

Casau (Occitan pronunciation: [kaˈzaw]) is a locality and decentralized municipal entity located in the municipality of Vielha e Mijaran, in Province of Lleida province, Catalonia, Spain. As of 2020, it has a population of 68.

== Geography ==
Casau is located 160km north of Lleida.
