= Gessa (Naut Aran) =

- Decentralized municipal entity
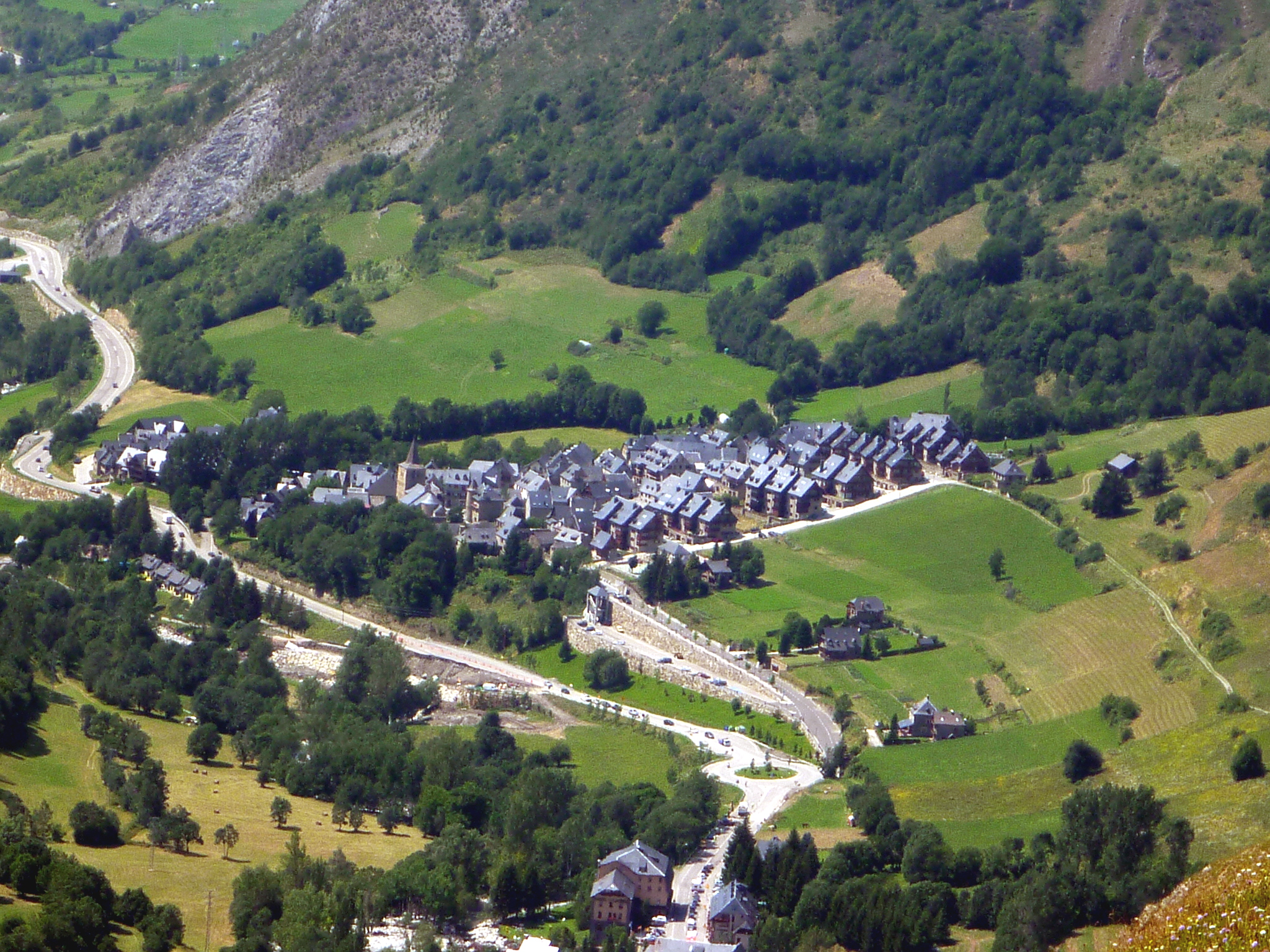

- Location within Province of Lleida Location within Catalonia Location within Spain
- Coordinates: 42°42′21″N 0°53′21″E
- Country: Spain
- Community: Catalonia
- Province: Lleida
- Municipality: Naut Aran
- Elevation: 1,243 m (4,078 ft)

Population
  - Total: 165

Gessa (Occitan pronunciation: [ˈʒesa]) is a locality and decentralized municipal entity located in the municipality of Naut Aran, in Province of Lleida province, Catalonia, Spain. As of 2020, it has a population of 165.

== Geography ==
Gessa is located 170km north of Lleida.
