= Vielha e Mijaran =

- Municipality
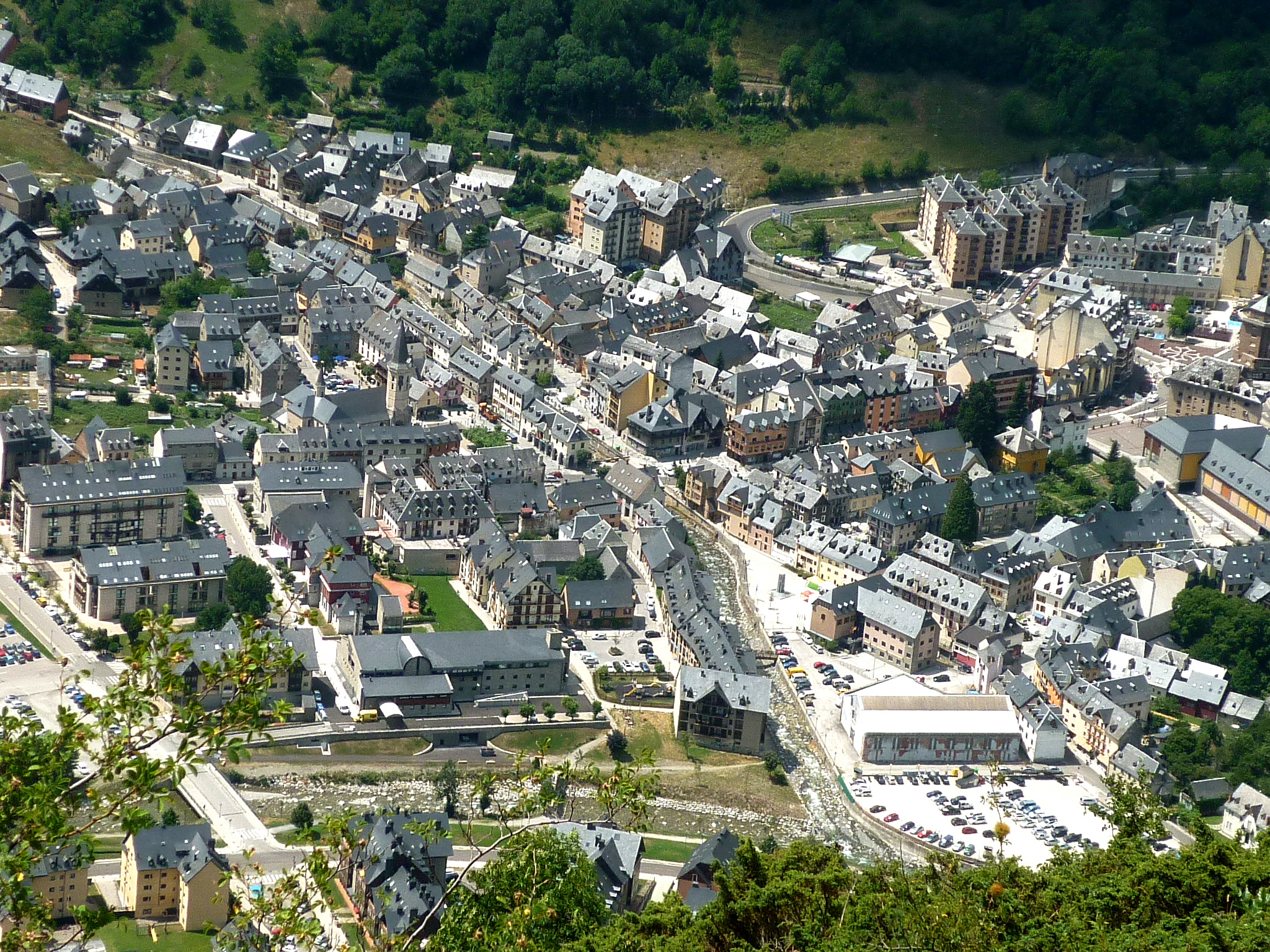

- Coat of arms

- Location in Aran

- Location in Catalonia Vielha e Mijaran (Spain)
- Coordinates: 42°42′15″N 0°47′46″E
- Country: Spain
- Community: Catalonia
- Province: Lleida
- Entity: Aran
- Terçons: Castièro, Marcatosa

Government
  - Mayor: Juan Antonio Serrano Iglesias (2015) (UA)

Area
  - Total: 211.7 km^{2} (81.7 sq mi)
- Elevation: 980 m (3,220 ft)

Population (2025-01-01)
  - Total: 5,865
  - Density: 27.70/km^{2} (71.75/sq mi)
- Postal code: 25530
- Climate: Cfb
- Website: vielha-mijaran.org

Vielha e Mijaran (Occitan pronunciation: [ˈbjeʎa e miʒaˈɾan]) is a municipality in central Aran, Catalonia, Spain. It is the capital and largest municipality of the region, with a population of 5,865 (register office, 2025). It is part of the terçons of Castièro and Marcatosa.

It was created in 1970 by the merger of the municipalities of Arròs e Vila, Betlan, Escunhau, Gausac, Vielha and Vilac as Viella – Mitg-Aran: some of the former municipalities retain some privileges as "decentralised municipal entities" (entitats municipals descentralitzades, EMD), as does the village of Betren. Mijaran literally means "Middle Aran" in Aranese, as the inhabited part of the municipality is situated in the valley of the Garonne (Garona). The Noguera Ribagorçana has its source on the territory of the municipality, on the opposite side of the watershed. The ajuntament (town hall) is in Vielha, spelled Vielha in Occitan and Viella in Catalan and Spanish, which is also the capital of Aran and also the seat of the Conselh Generau d'Aran.

The municipality is linked to France and to the rest of Catalonia (via the Vielha tunnel) by the N-230 road. The C-28 (old name: C-142) road continues up the valley to Naut Aran, and on over the Port de la Bonaigua (2,072 m, 6,798 ft) to the comarca of Pallars Sobirà. This road, the higher stretches of which are impassable in winter, was the only route between the Aran valley and the rest of Spain before the opening of the Vielha tunnel in 1948.

== Subdivisions ==
The municipality is composed of thirteen distinct settlements. Populations are given as of 2001:

- Arròs (95)
- Aubèrt (104), in the EMD of Aubèrt e Betlan
- Betlan (24), on the left bank of the Garonne
- Betren (376), on the left bank of the Garonne
- Casarilh (64), in the EMD of Escunhau e Casarilh, on the left bank of the Garonne
- Casau (87), inhabited in Roman times
- Escunhau (89)
- Gausac (555)
- Mont (25), on the right bank of the Garonne at the foot of the Es Cròdos range
- Montcorbau (17), on the right bank of the Garonne
- Vielha (2,620)
- Vila (30)
- Vilac (147)

== Climate ==
Climate data for Vielha e Mijaran
Month	Jan	Feb	Mar	Apr	May	Jun	Jul	Aug	Sep	Oct	Nov	Dec	Year
Record high °C (°F)	21.0 (69.8)	23.0 (73.4)	27.0 (80.6)	27.0 (80.6)	31.0 (87.8)	36.0 (96.8)	37.0 (98.6)	37.0 (98.6)	35.0 (95.0)	28.0 (82.4)	25.0 (77.0)	22.0 (71.6)	37.0 (98.6)
Mean daily maximum °C (°F)	7.3 (45.1)	8.8 (47.8)	11.3 (52.3)	13.0 (55.4)	17.2 (63.0)	21.2 (70.2)	24.7 (76.5)	24.3 (75.7)	22.1 (71.8)	17.3 (63.1)	11.1 (52.0)	7.1 (44.8)	15.4 (59.7)
Daily mean °C (°F)	2.6 (36.7)	3.6 (38.5)	5.6 (42.1)	7.6 (45.7)	11.2 (52.2)	14.9 (58.8)	17.9 (64.2)	17.5 (63.5)	15.2 (59.4)	11.1 (52.0)	5.9 (42.6)	2.6 (36.7)	9.6 (49.3)
Mean daily minimum °C (°F)	−2.2 (28.0)	−1.5 (29.3)	−0.2 (31.6)	2.2 (36.0)	5.3 (41.5)	8.6 (47.5)	11.2 (52.2)	10.8 (51.4)	8.4 (47.1)	4.9 (40.8)	0.7 (33.3)	−1.9 (28.6)	3.8 (38.8)
Record low °C (°F)	−20.0 (−4.0)	−19.0 (−2.2)	−13.0 (8.6)	−6.0 (21.2)	−3.0 (26.6)	0.0 (32.0)	3.0 (37.4)	3.0 (37.4)	−1.0 (30.2)	−6.0 (21.2)	−14.0 (6.8)	−16.0 (3.2)	−20.0 (−4.0)
Average precipitation mm (inches)	75.1 (2.96)	60.1 (2.37)	63.6 (2.50)	89.7 (3.53)	100.3 (3.95)	78.1 (3.07)	64.5 (2.54)	78.6 (3.09)	73.6 (2.90)	69.1 (2.72)	95.9 (3.78)	91.1 (3.59)	939.7 (37.00)
Average snowfall cm (inches)	28.5 (11.2)	31.0 (12.2)	22.0 (8.7)	2.5 (1.0)	1.5 (0.6)	0 (0)	0 (0)	0 (0)	0.1 (0.0)	9.5 (3.7)	13.5 (5.3)	38.0 (15.0)	146.6 (57.7)
Average precipitation days	11.0	10.1	11.4	13.6	12.9	10.9	7.8	8.8	8.2	8.9	9.9	11.0	124.5
Average rainy days	1.4	0.8	6.2	12.1	12.7	10.9	7.8	8.8	8.1	5.1	3.0	1.8	78.7
Average snowy days	9.1	9.3	5.2	1.5	0.2	0	0	0	0.1	3.8	6.9	9.2	42.3
Mean monthly sunshine hours	72.5	105.0	155.1	176.1	199.2	216.6	247.6	228.8	195.0	128.2	78.0	55.3	1,857.4
Source: Meteorological Service of Catalonia

== Politics ==
Local elections of 2019
Political party	2019	
Political party	%	Seats
Unity of Aran (UA) - Socialists' Party of Catalonia (PSC)	59,45	9
Aranese Democratic Convergence (CDA)	19,98	3
Aran Amassa (Amassa)	7,86	1

Local elections of 2015
Political party	2015	
Political party	%	Seats
Unity of Aran (UA) - Socialists' Party of Catalonia (PSC)	46,67	7
Aranese Democratic Convergence (CDA)	38,68	5
Citizens (C's)	7,24	1

== Gallery ==
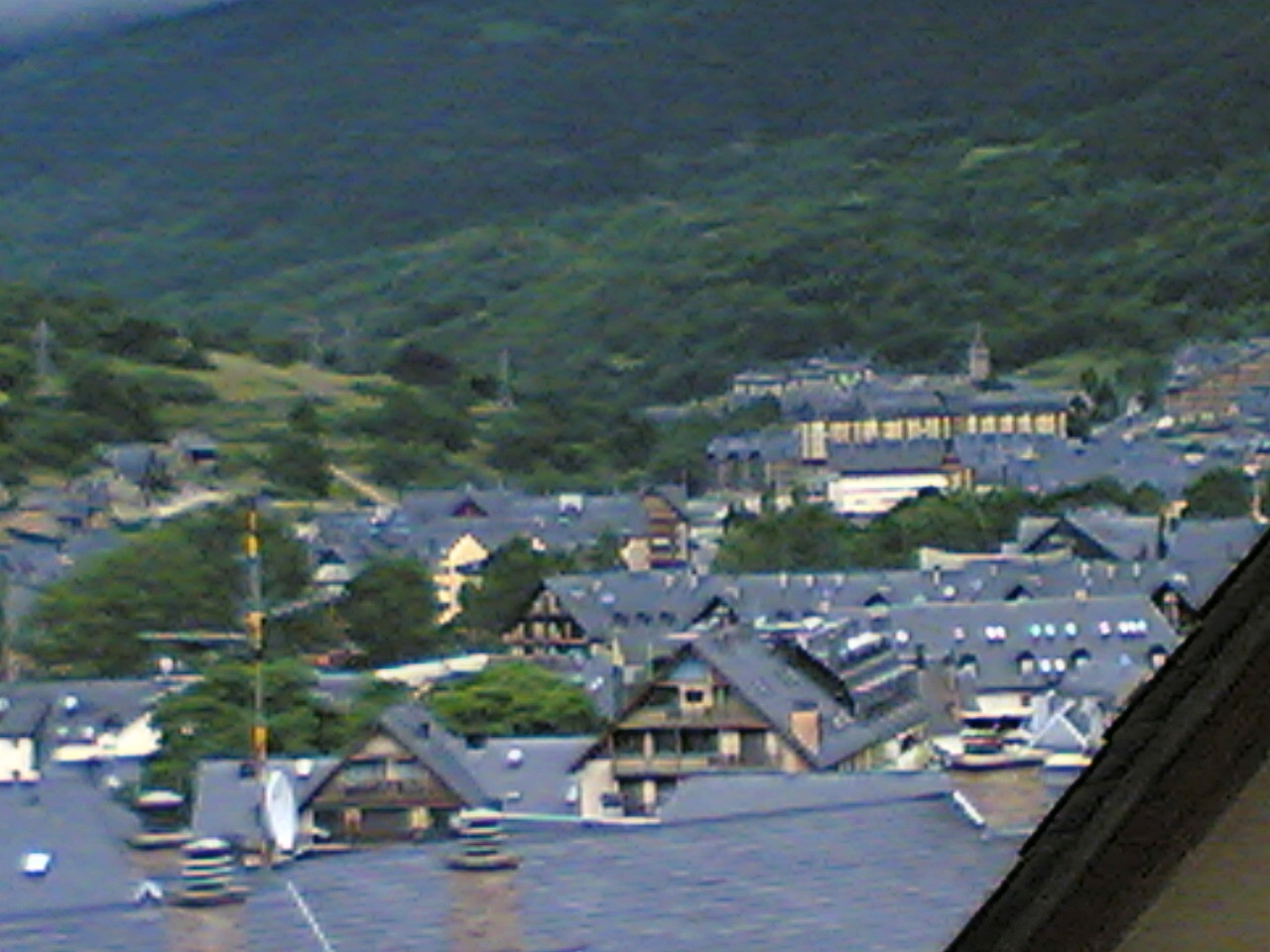
View from the hotel Vielha

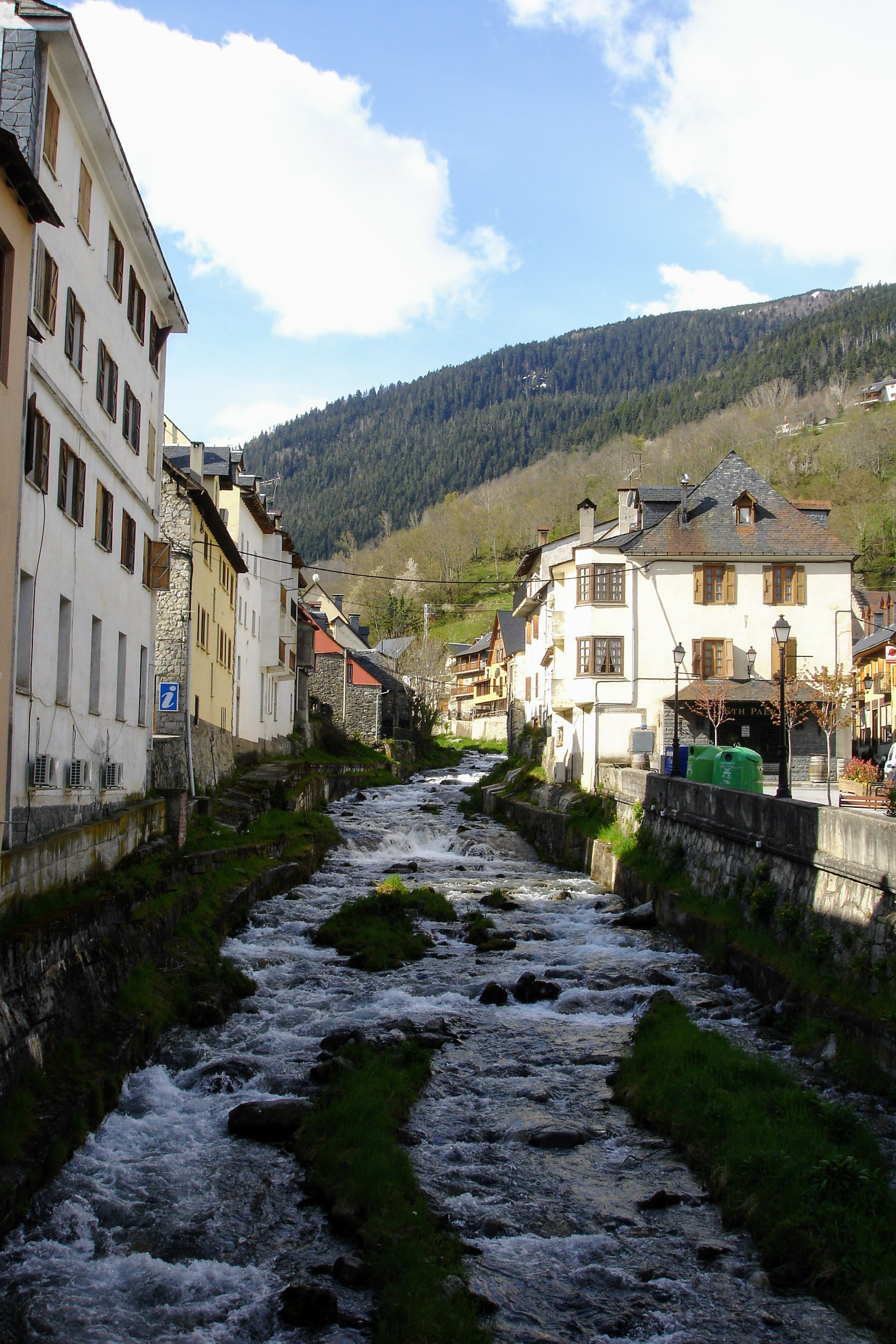
The Nere River (Arriu Nere) as it passes through Vielha before emptying into the Garonne

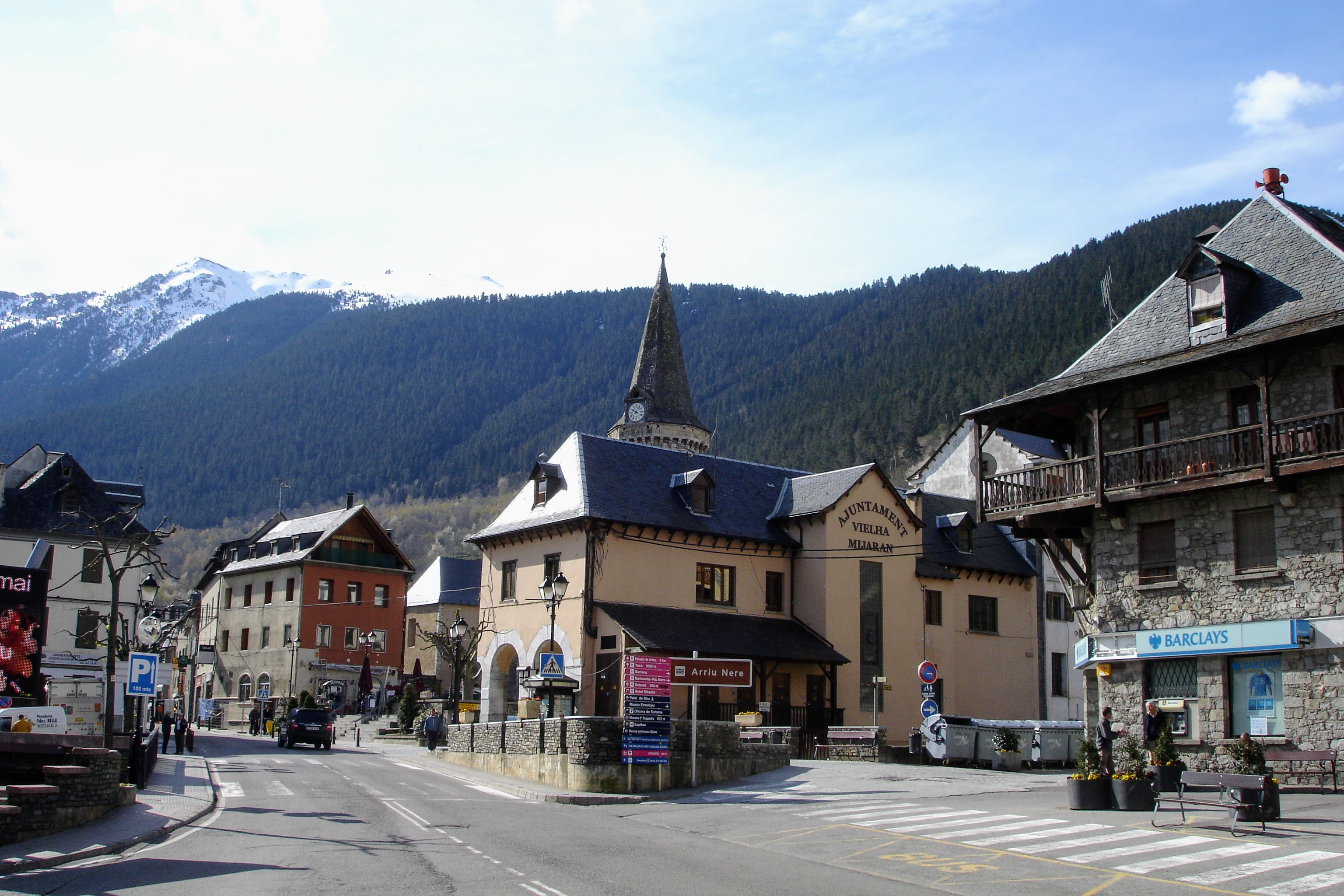
A view of Vielha city hall and St. Michael's Church (Glèisa de Sant Miquèu) from Plaça Sant Antoni

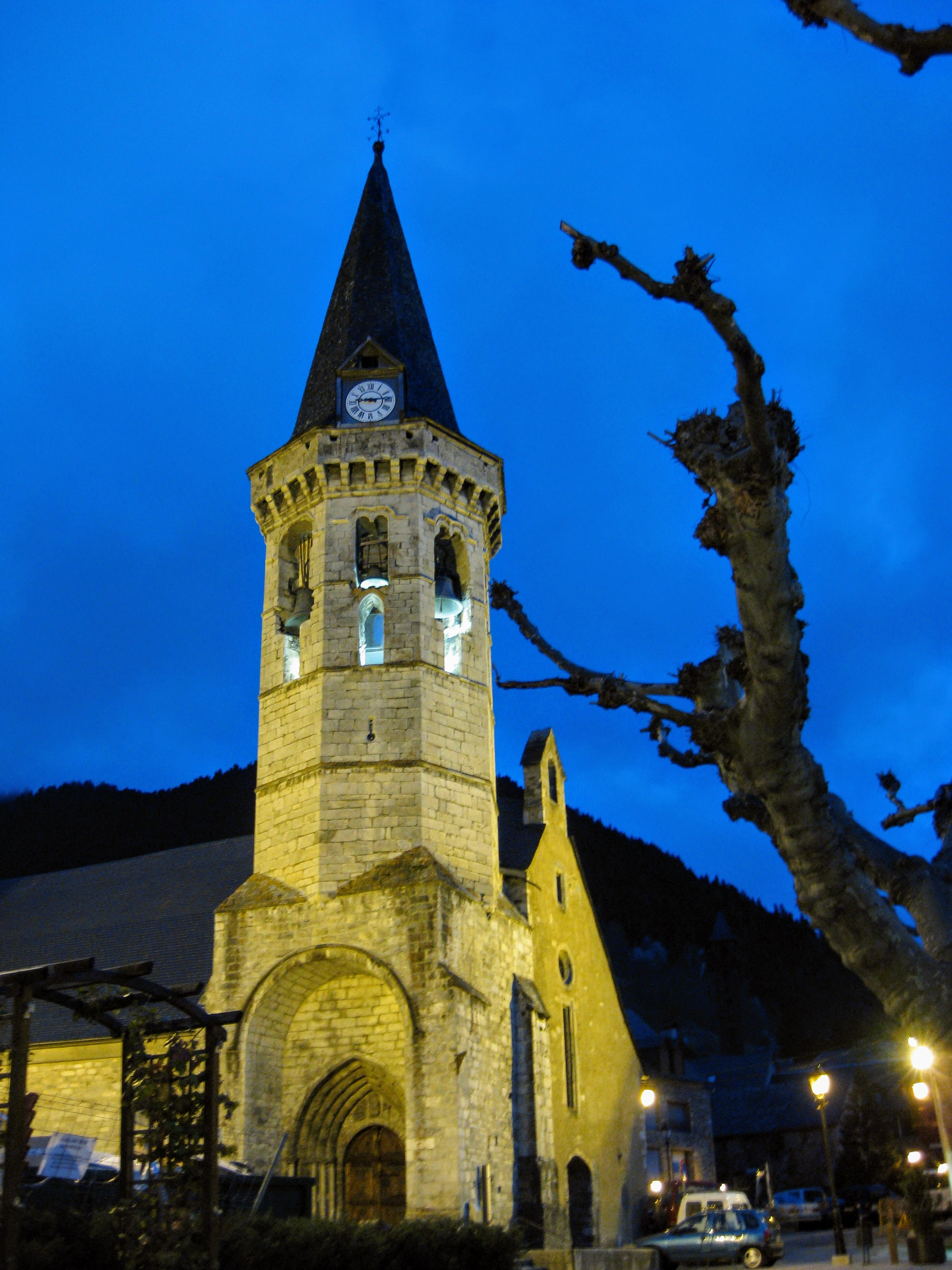
St. Michael's Church (Glèisa de Sant Miquèu) at night

== Sister cities ==
- Saint-Gaudens, France

== Sources ==
- Panareda Clopés, Josep Maria; Rios Calvet, Jaume; Rabella Vives, Josep Maria (1989). Guia de Catalunya, Barcelona: Caixa de Catalunya. ISBN 84-87135-01-3 (Spanish). ISBN 84-87135-02-1 (Catalan).
