= Bagerque =

Bagergue
- Decentralized municipal entity
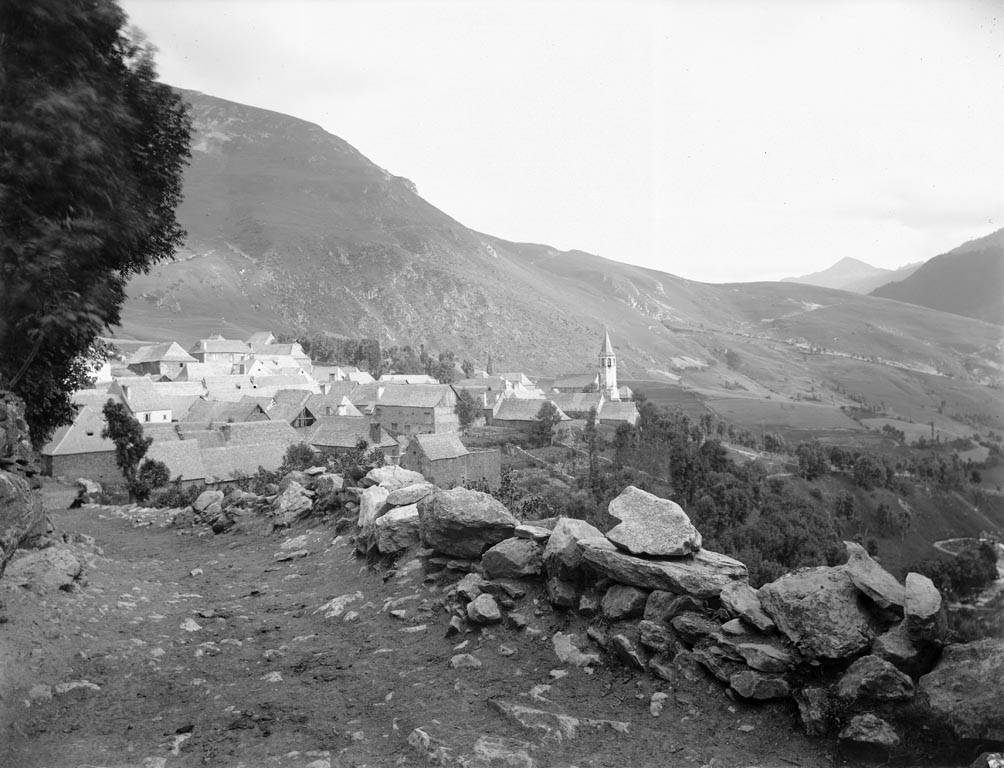

- Location within Province of Lleida Location within Catalonia Location within Spain
- Coordinates: 42°43′8″N 0°54′56″E
- Country: Spain
- Community: Catalonia
- Province: Lleida
- Municipality: Naut Aran
- Elevation: 1,424 m (4,672 ft)

Population
  - Total: 101

Bagergue (Occitan pronunciation: [baˈʒerɣe]) is a locality and decentralized municipal entity located in the municipality of Naut Aran, in Province of Lleida province, Catalonia, Spain. As of 2020, it has a population of 101.

== Geography ==
Bagergue is located 173km north-northeast of Lleida.
