= Gausac =

- Village
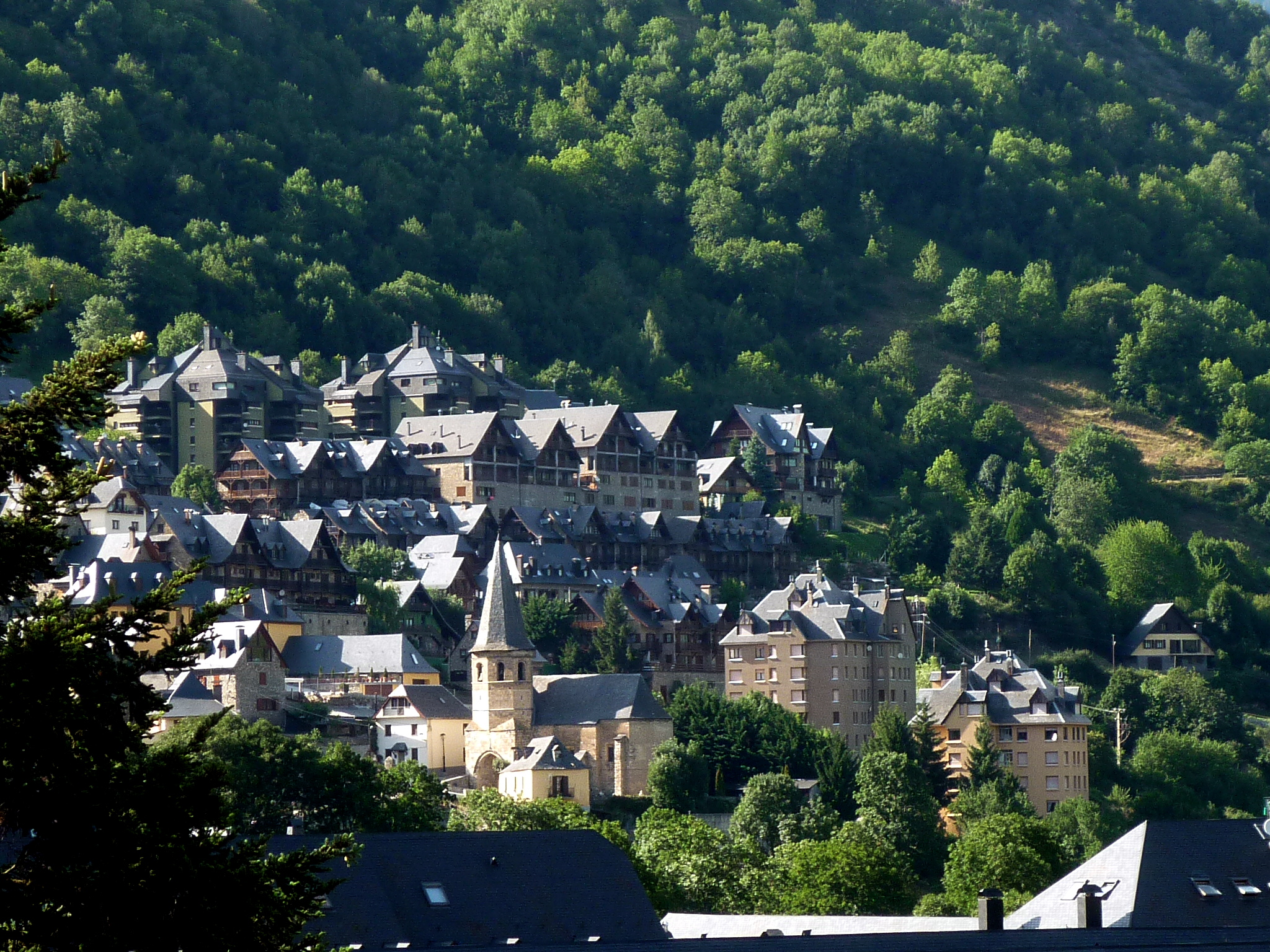

- Location in Catalonia
- Coordinates: 42°42′30″N 0°47′27″E
- Country: Spain
- Community: Catalonia
- Province: Lleida
- Special division: Val d'Aran
- Municipality: Vielha e Mijaran
- Elevation: 1,020 m (3,350 ft)

Population (2016)
  - Total: 518
- Postal code: 25538
- Climate: Cfb

Gausac (Occitan pronunciation: [gawˈzak]) is a village located in the municipality of Vielha e Mijaran, in the Val d'Aran. It is a set that is part of the Inventory of the Architectural Heritage of Catalonia.

The village of Gausac, head of the old homonymous municipality, is located at 994 m altitude, to the left of the Garonne and at the NW end of the plain of Vielha, at the foot of the mountain slopes of Varicauva. The nucleus, which in 1981 was 245 h, extends along the ridge overlooking the small gorge of Gausac, in a typical village setting, sloping. But the primitive image of an isolated people has been severely affected by the proximity of Vielha, the anarchic urbanization of which has gone towards Gausac's path and has determined that the two gay cores would unite, good and turning Gausac in a neighborhood of Vielha. At the lower end of the town, on the highway, there is the parochial church of Sant Martí de Gausac, Gothic (15th century), which stands out above the urbanistic scourge.
