= Arties =

- Locality
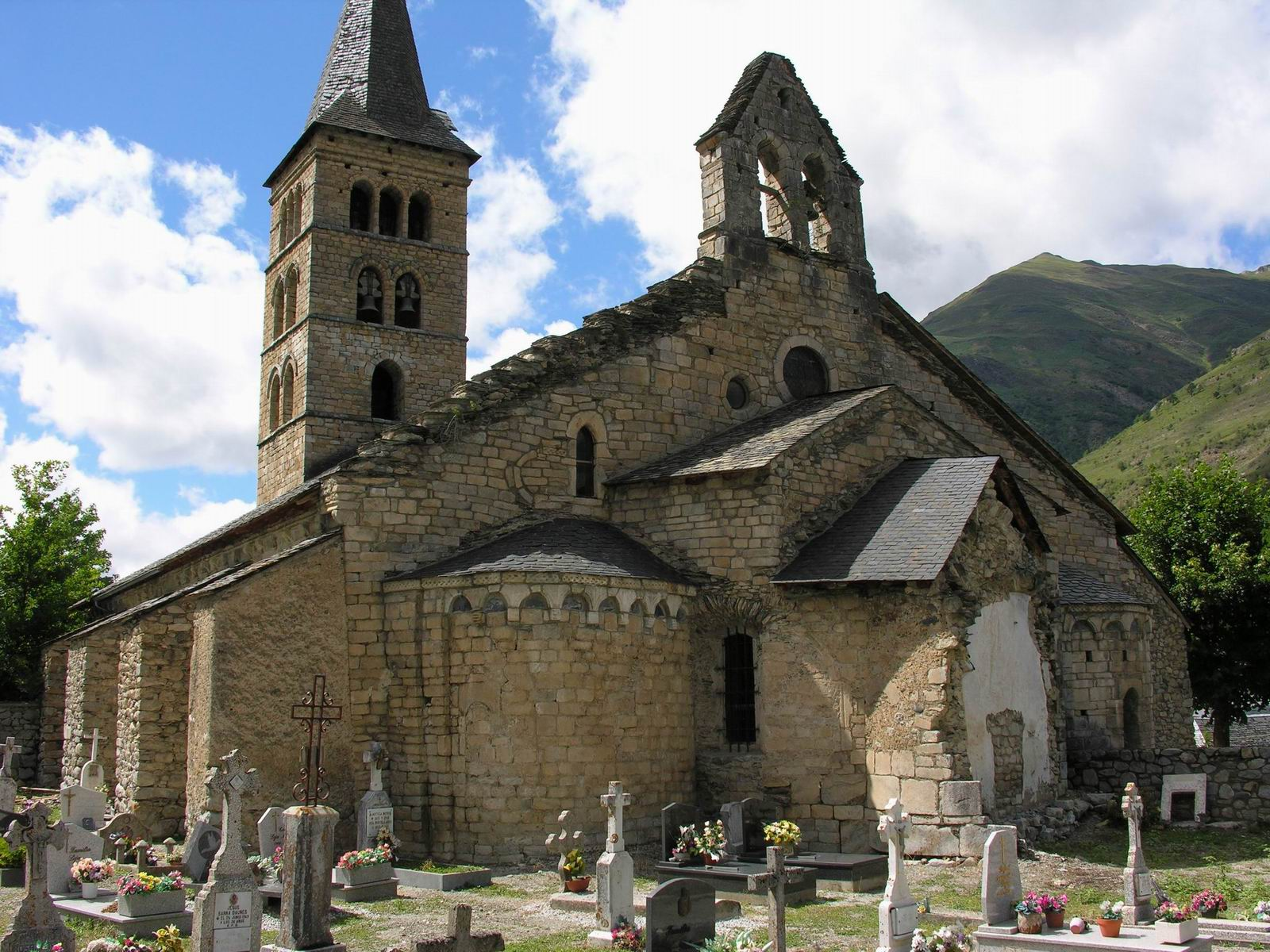

- Location within Province of Lleida Location within Catalonia Location within Spain
- Coordinates: 42°41′55″N 0°52′17″E
- Country: Spain
- Community: Catalonia
- Province: Lleida
- Municipality: Naut Aran
- Elevation: 1,139 m (3,737 ft)

Population
  - Total: 492

Arties (Occitan pronunciation: [aɾˈti.es]) is a locality located in the municipality of Naut Aran, in Province of Lleida province, Catalonia, Spain. As of 2020, it has a population of 492.

== Geography ==
Arties is located 168 km north of Lleida.
