= Tredós =

Tredòs
- Decentralized municipal entity
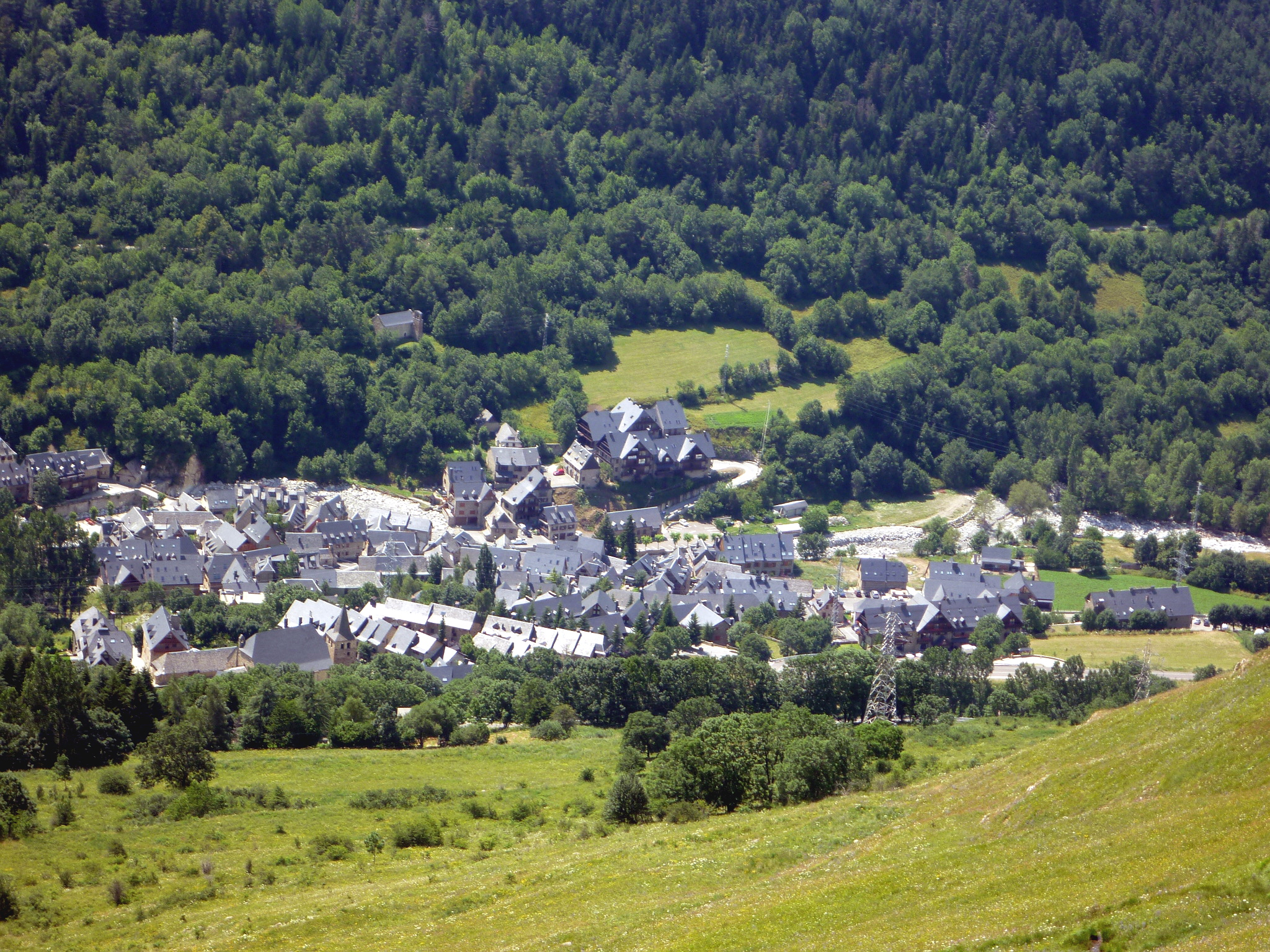

- Location within Province of Lleida Location within Catalonia Location within Spain
- Coordinates: 42°42′6″N 0°54′55″E
- Country: Spain
- Community: Catalonia
- Province: Lleida
- Municipality: Naut Aran
- Elevation: 1,297 m (4,255 ft)

Population
  - Total: 176

Tredòs (Occitan pronunciation: [tɾeˈðɔs]) is a locality and decentralized municipal entity located in the municipality of Naut Aran, in Province of Lleida province, Catalonia, Spain. As of 2020, it has a population of 176.

== Geography ==
Tredòs is located 172km north-northeast of Lleida.
