= Querimonia =

The Querimonia (Occitan: Querimònia) is a legal document written in Latin that details the political and administrative autonomy granted to the Aran Valley (Catalonia, Spain) by James II of Aragon in 1313. The valley maintained a special status until 1834 when the queen regent María Cristina forced the integration of the valley with the province of Lleida. In 1990, the Aranese once again achieved a measure of autonomy when the autonomous community of Catalonia devolved power to the local government, giving them control over education, sanitation, culture, environment, agriculture and tourism.

== Rights ==
The querimonia confirmed and ceded the following rights to the Aranese:

- Free and explicit common ownership by the Aranese of their mountains without tribute or subsidy; with the freedom of pasture for all meadows and fields
- Free use of the forests
- Free use of water, for irrigation as well as mills
- The freedom to fish and hunt
- Exemption from all royal servitude, burden, and imposition
- Recognition of the traditional Aranese convinença (Note: A set of rules for communal property ownership and how expenses and gains were shared and passed on in the event of death of one or both parties. In the absence of an explicit agreement, the convinença became the default disposition.) and the torneria. (Note: A rule requiring that the seller of a property must first offer to sell to their siblings and close relatives, if relatives chose not to buy then the seller could sell to anyone. If the property was not first offered to relatives, they had the right to challenge the sale.)

In return, the Aranese agreed to pay a tribute once per year to the king called the Galin Reiau, consisting of a quantity of wheat per resident of the valley.

== Sources ==
- Carbonell i de Ballester, Jordi; Carreras i Marti, Joan. "torneria". Gran Enciclopèdia Catalana (in Catalan). Enciclopèdia Catalana.
