= Casarilh =

Casarilh Casarill
- village
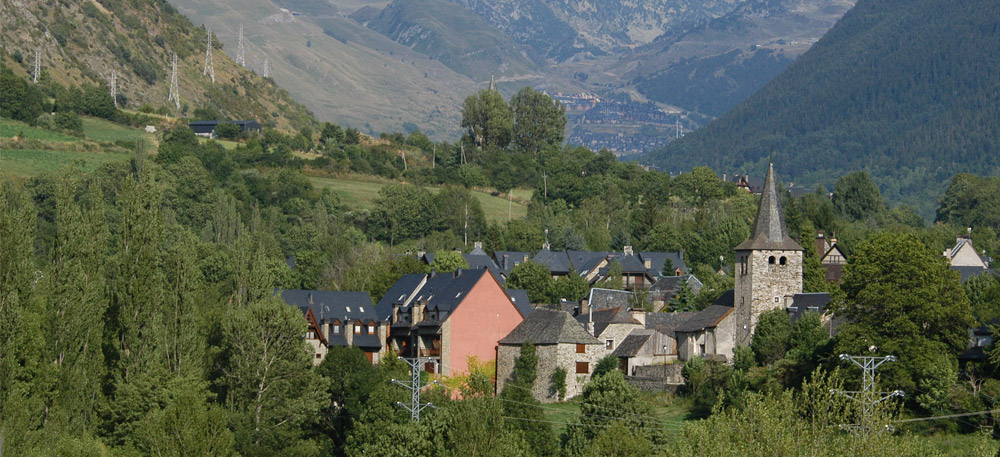

- Location in Catalonia
- Coordinates: 42°41′59″N 0°49′51″E
- Country: Spain
- Community: Catalonia
- Province: Lleida
- Special division: Val d'Aran
- Municipality: Vielha e Mijaran
- Elevation: 1,050 m (3,440 ft)

Population (2020)
  - Total: 84
- Postal code: 25538
- Climate: Cfb

Casarilh (Occitan pronunciation: [kazaˈɾiʎ]) is a village located in the municipality of Vielha e Mijaran, in the Val d'Aran.

== Description ==
The village of Casarilh is located on the left bank of the Garonne, at the eastern end of the municipality, at an altitude of 1050 m. The village, with 84 inhabitants in 2020, is crossed by the old Camin Reiau, parallel to the C-142 road, which surrounds it at noon. The nucleus, with a very simple structure, is presided over by the parish church of Sant Martí, of Romanesque origin, with a massive bell tower and a late Roman tombstone.

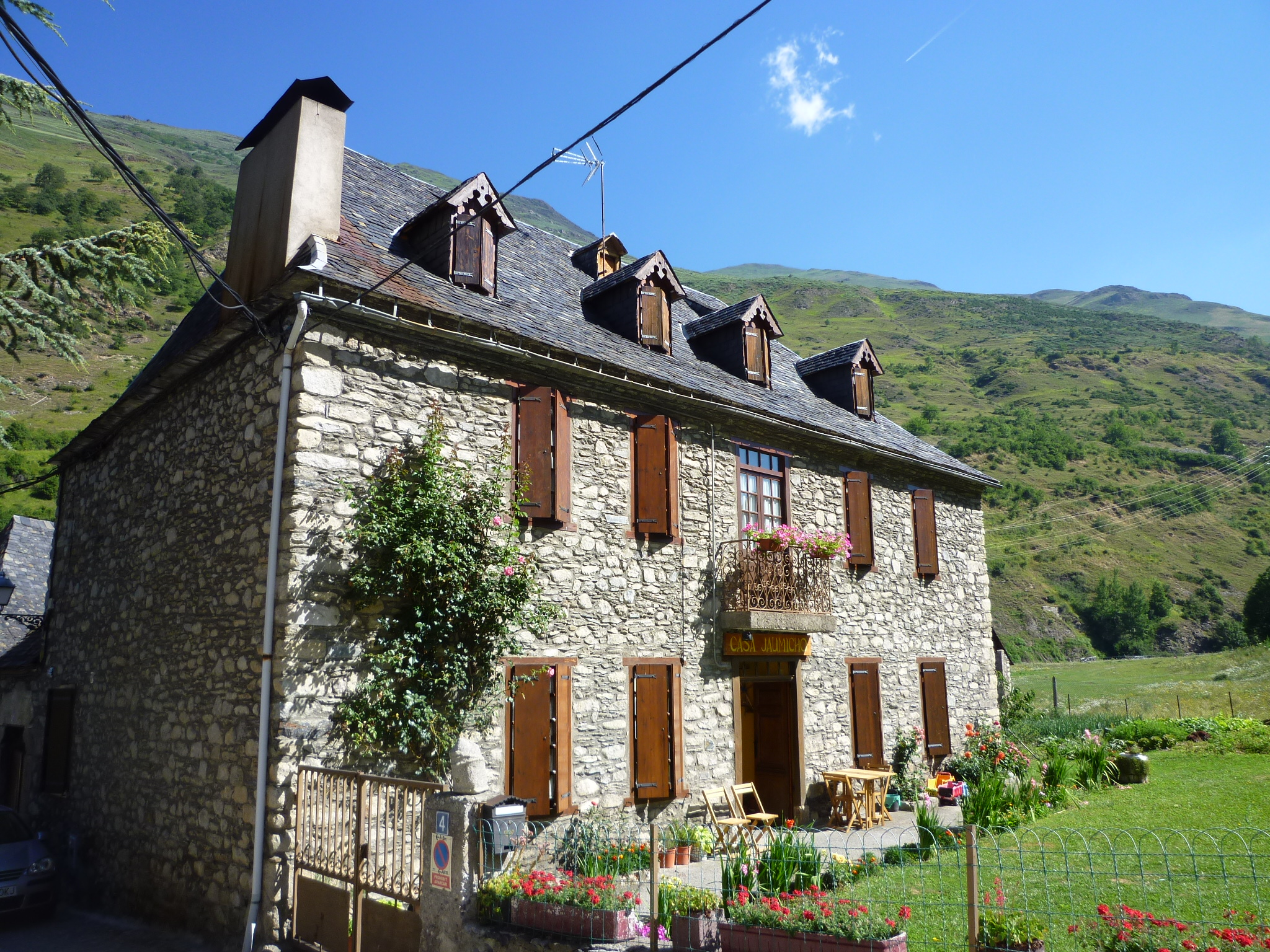
Casa Jaumitxu in Casarilh
