= Vilac =

- Decentralized municipal entity
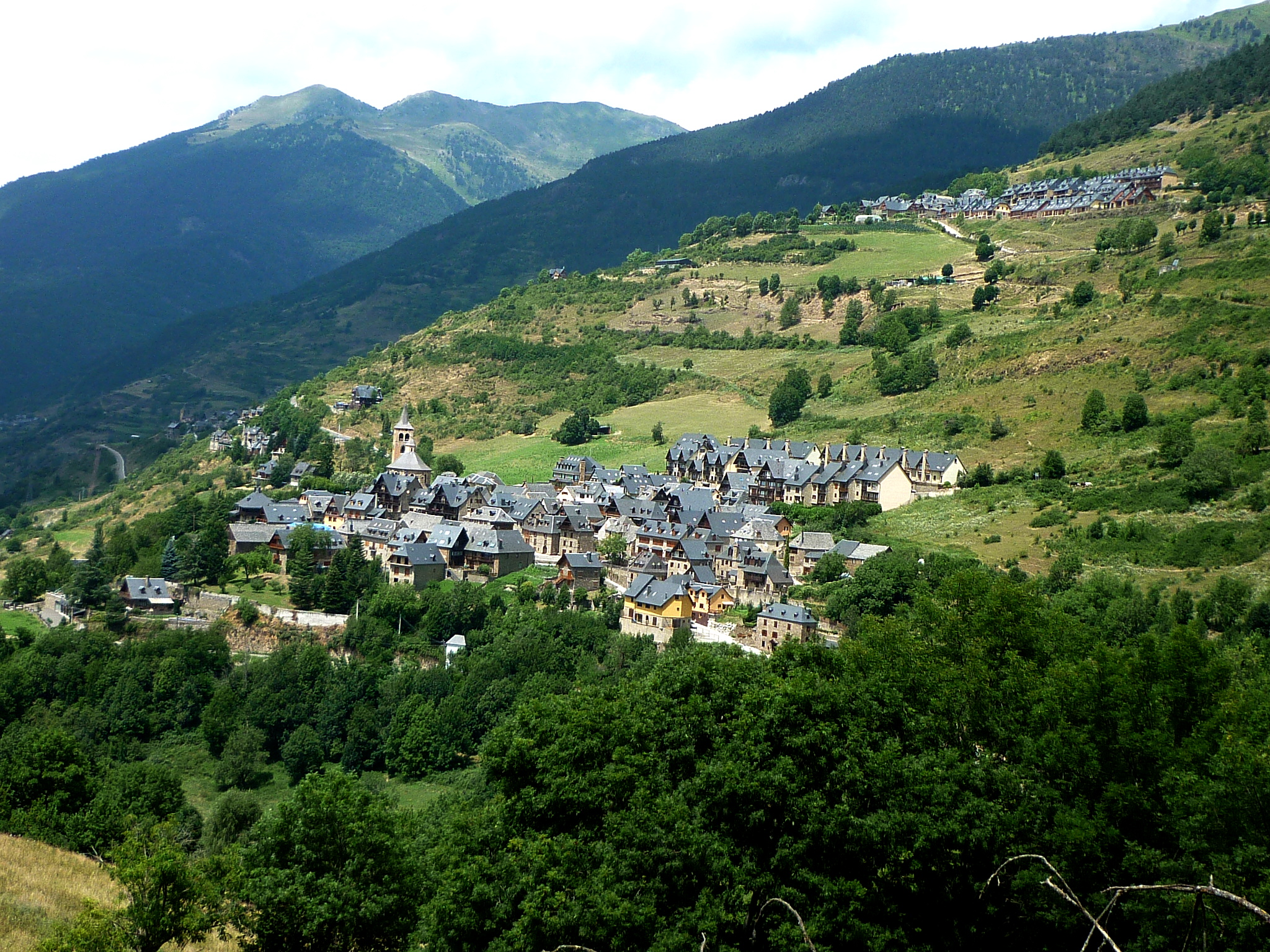

- Location within Province of Lleida Location within Catalonia Location within Spain
- Coordinates: 42°43′17″N 0°47′55″E
- Country: Spain
- Community: Catalonia
- Province: Lleida
- Municipality: Vielha e Mijaran
- Elevation: 1,042 m (3,419 ft)

Population
  - Total: 223

Vilac (Occitan pronunciation: [biˈlak]) is a locality and decentralized municipal entity located in the municipality of Vielha e Mijaran, in Province of Lleida province, Catalonia, Spain. As of 2020, it has a population of 223.

== Geography ==
Vilac is located 165km north of Lleida.
