= Vila (Vielha e Mijaran) =

- Locality
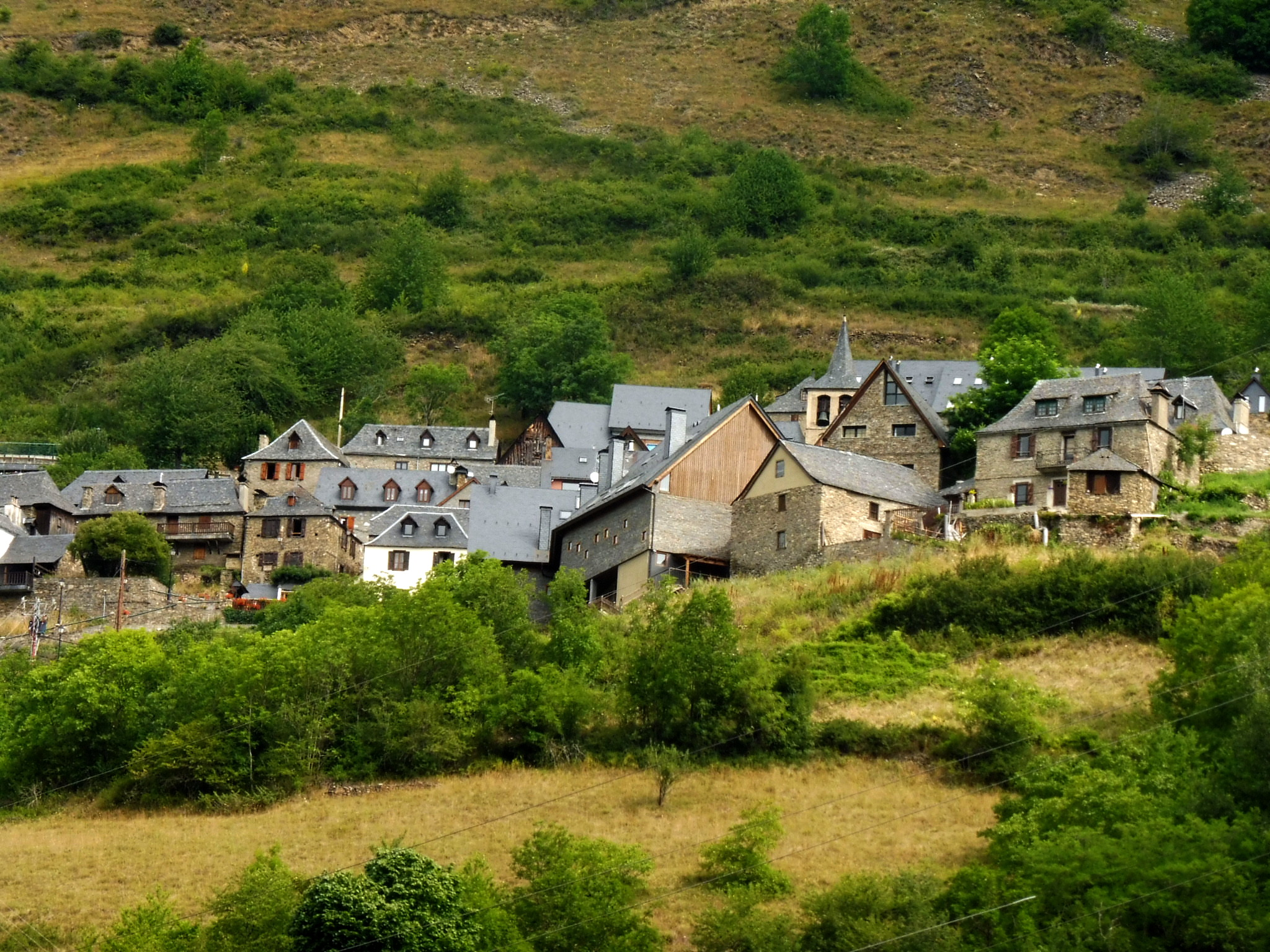

- Location within Province of Lleida Location within Catalonia Location within Spain
- Coordinates: 42°44′11″N 0°46′34″E
- Country: Spain
- Community: Catalonia
- Province: Lleida
- Municipality: Vielha e Mijaran
- Elevation: 1,065 m (3,494 ft)

Population
  - Total: 57

Vila (Occitan pronunciation: [ˈbila]) is a locality located in the municipality of Vielha e Mijaran, in Province of Lleida province, Catalonia, Spain. As of 2020, it has a population of 57.

== Geography ==
Vila is located 168km north of Lleida.
