= Betlan =

- Village
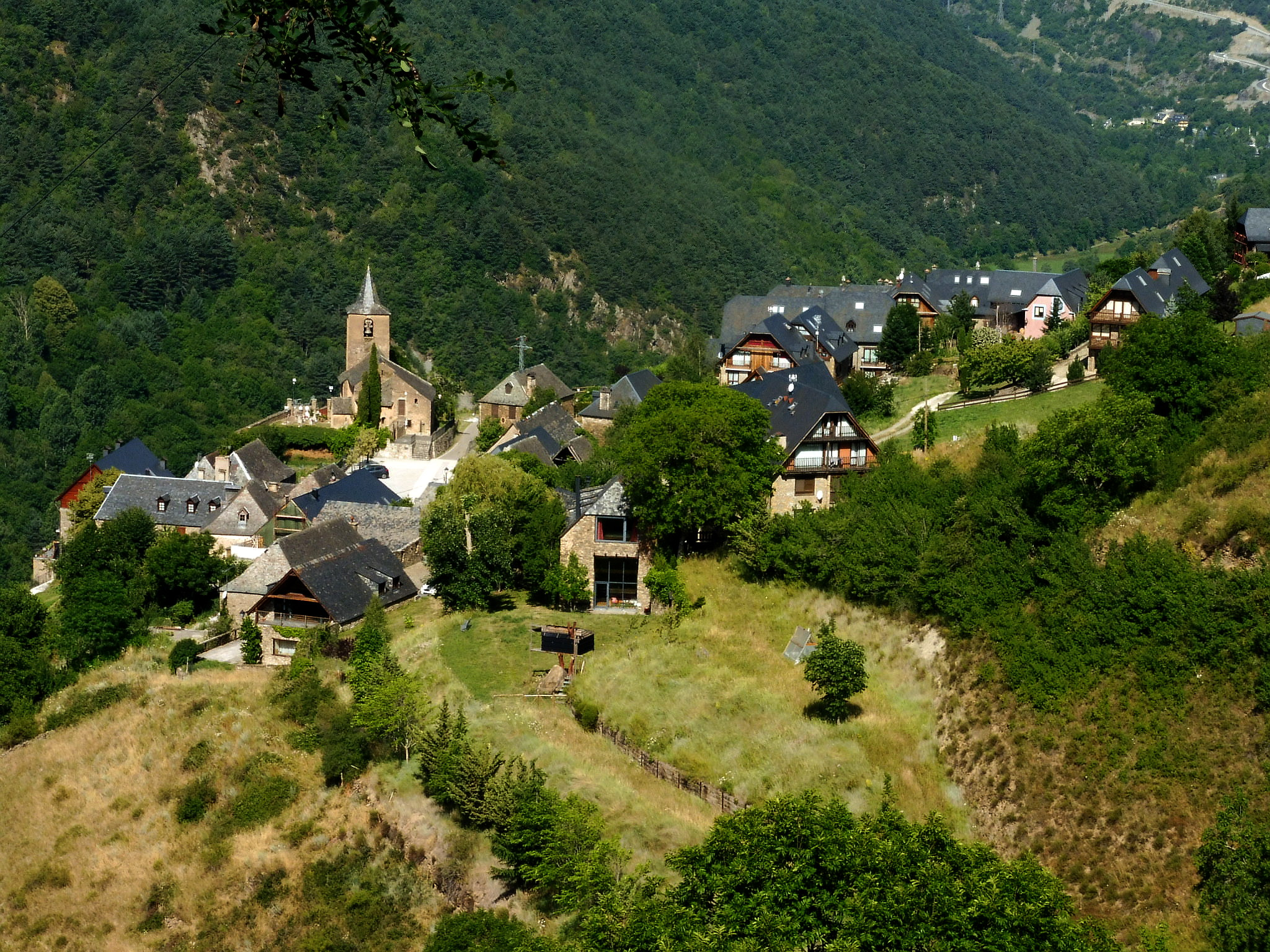

- Location in Catalonia
- Coordinates: 42°43′41″N 0°47′12″E
- Country: Spain
- Community: Catalonia
- Province: Lleida
- Special division: Val d'Aran
- Municipality: Vielha e Mijaran
- Elevation: 1,047 m (3,435 ft)

Population (2016)
  - Total: 31
- Postal code: 25537
- Climate: Cfb

Betlan (Occitan pronunciation: [belˈlan]) is a village located in the municipality of Vielha e Mijaran (Val d'Aran) included in the Inventory of the Architectural Heritage of Catalonia.

== Description ==
The town of Betlan, head of the old homonymous municipality of the central sector of the Val d'Aran, is 1047 meters high, in a landing on the right side of the Garonne, surrounded by fields and meadows. It is one of the smallest nuclei in the Valley, with only 12 h in 1981. The few houses are located around a large square enclosed in the west by the parochial church of San Pedro, one of the oldest religious buildings of the valley, probably from the 11th century, very disfigured by additions and later reforms, preserves the Romanesque apse.
