= Arròs =

- Village
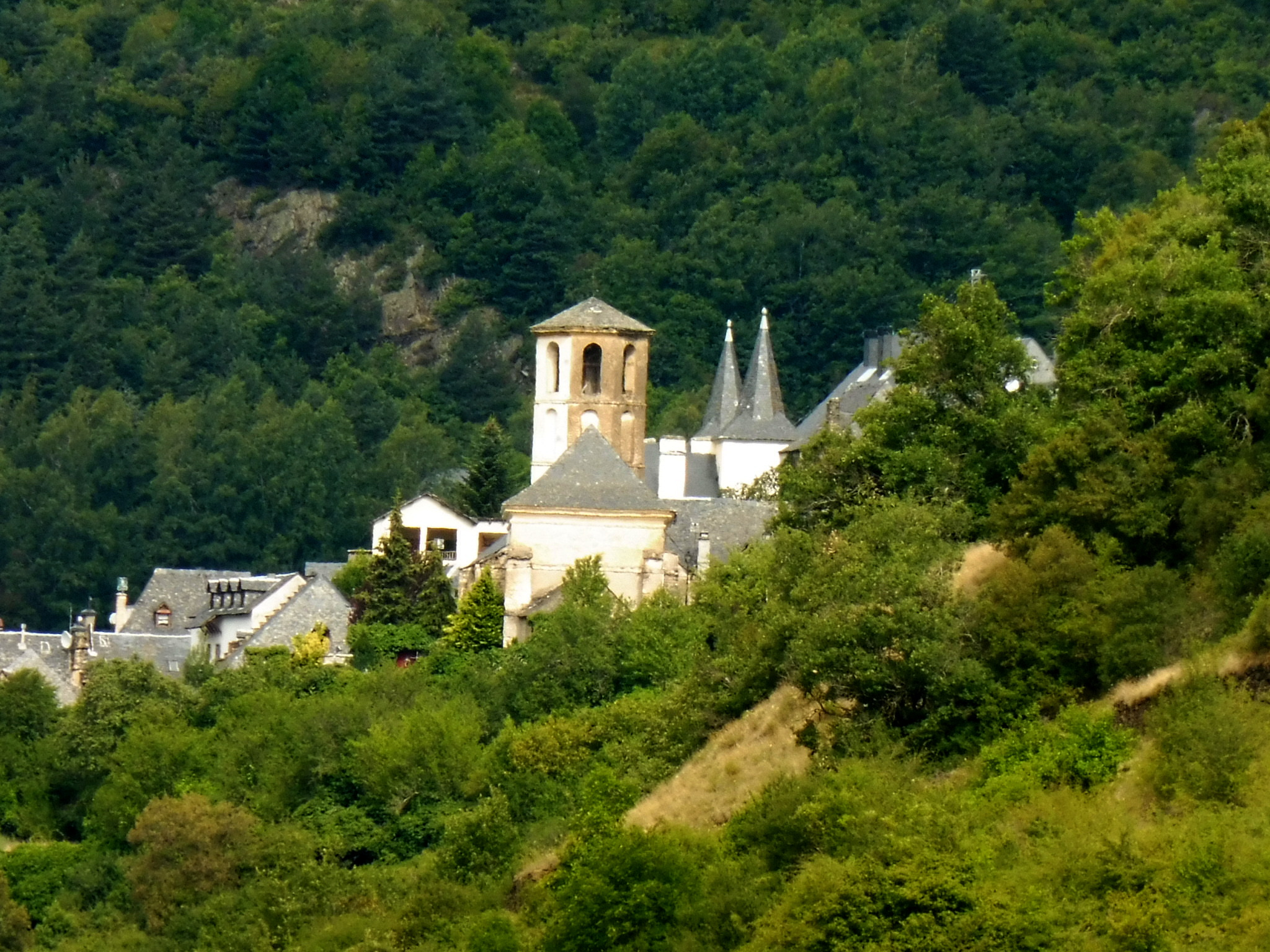

- Location in Catalonia
- Coordinates: 42°44′19″N 0°45′43″E
- Country: Spain
- Community: Catalonia
- Province: Lleida
- Special division: Val d'Aran
- Municipality: Vielha e Mijaran
- Elevation: 1,047 m (3,435 ft)

Population (2016)
  - Total: 99
- Postal code: 25537
- Climate: Cfb

Arròs (Occitan pronunciation: [aˈrɔs]) is a village located in the municipality of Vielha e Mijaran (Val d'Aran).

== Description ==
The village of Arròs, which was part of the old municipality of Arròs i Vila, is 956 m above sea level, on the right bank of the Garonne (before its confluence with the river Varradós), on the eastern slopes of the Mariagata mountain. In 1981 it was 66 h. The village, staggered by the slope of the mountain, has the parish church of Santa Eulàlia, a gothic building from the 14th century, which is later refurbished. An interesting civil building is Casa Ademar (well-known also for Ço deth Senhor), of great proportions, with two towers at the ends of the facade. It was built in 1829 within a neoclassical style.
