= 2018 Haute-Garonne's 8th constituency by-election =

← 2017	11 March 2018 (first round); 18 March 2018 (second round)	2022 →
- Turnout: 34.41% ▼18.35% (first round); 33.08% ▼14.13% (second round)
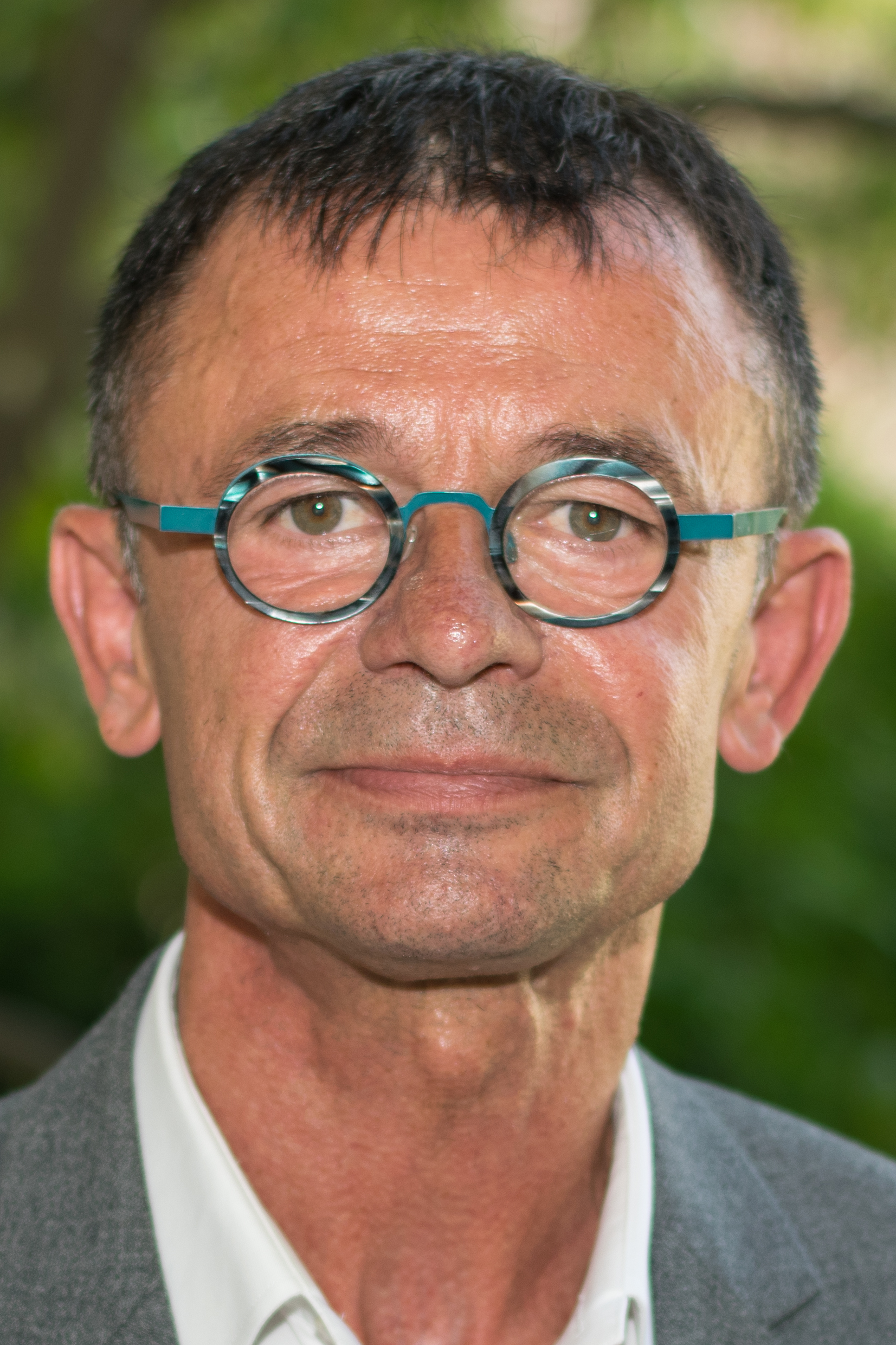

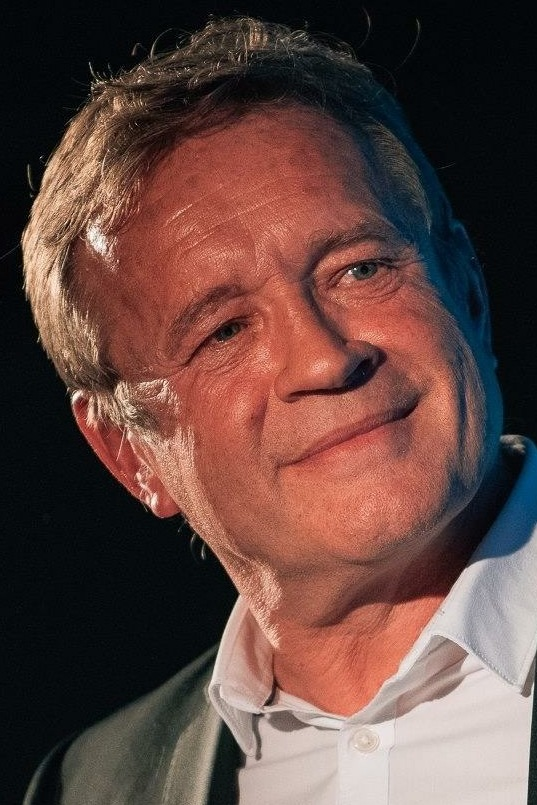
Nominee	Joël Aviragnet	Michel Montsarrat	Philippe Gimenez
Party	PS	LREM	LFI
1st round %	10,777; 38.74% ▲20.96%	5,651; 20.31% ▼13.09%	3,623; 13.02% ▼1.08%
2nd round %	17,156; 70.30% ▲20.17%	7,247; 29.70% ▼20.17%	Eliminated
Nominee	Marie-Christine Parolin
Party	FN
1st round %	3,264; 11.73% ▼3.50%
2nd round %	Eliminated
Incumbent Deputy
Joël Aviragnet
PS

A by-election was held in Haute-Garonne's 8th constituency on 11 March 2018, with a second round on 18 March as no candidate secured a majority of votes in the first round. The by-election was prompted after the Constitutional Council invalidated the election of Joël Aviragnet, candidate of the Socialist Party (PS), in the June 2017 legislative elections on 18 December 2017.

Aviragnet was re-elected by a massive margin in the second round rematch against Montsarrat, securing over 70% of valid votes and winning by a margin 40 points larger than in June 2017.

== Background ==
Following the second round of the 2017 legislative election in Haute-Garonne's 8th constituency on 18 June, Michel Montsarrat, candidate of La République En Marche! defeated by 91 votes, filed an appeal with the Constitutional Council appealing the election of Joël Aviragnet of the Socialist Party (PS). Montsarrat questioned a number of irregularities, including those in several communes where Aviragnet multiplied his result in the second round.

On 18 December, the constitutional council annulled the election of Aviragnet, considering the irregularities listed by Montserrat to have affected 4 votes given differences in signatures indicating that votes were not given by the voter in question, 1 vote in Saint-Bertrand-de-Comminges and 10 votes in Montastruc-de-Salies given discrepancies between the number of ballots and signatures, and 64 votes in the only polling station in Gensac-de-Boulogne where article L. 68 of the electoral code, requiring the registration lists of every polling station and associated documents be transmitted along with the record of voting operations after the completion of voting, was not respected. Given these issues, and the small number of votes separating the two candidates, the constitutional council judged it appropriate to annul the result and call a by-election within the constituency. The first and second rounds of the by-election are scheduled for 11 and 18 March 2018, with candidacies to submitted between 12 and 16 February.

Polling stations throughout the constituency will be open from 8:00 to 18:00 CET, with those in Saint-Gaudens open until 19:00 CET.

== Candidates and campaign ==
Michel Montsarrat, a former rugby player for AS Béziers Hérault, later a restaurateur, and hotel manager living in Luchon, was once again invested as a candidate of La République En Marche!, supported by the nine deputies of the presidential party in the department. On 30 January, the Union of Democrats and Independents (UDI) decided to back Montsarrat in the by-election, breaking from the party's historical alliance with the right. The initial campaign of Montsarrat was considered lethargic, and was perturbed by the apparent theft of the laptop of his campaign director on 25 January, adding to existing frustration with his campaign management. Montsarrat was castigated early on over the potential closure of the court of Saint-Gaudens, and later over the invitation of Montsarrat to a visit by Laura Flessel as a "deputy for Haute-Garonne" on a published list of invitees. On 9 January, justice minister Nicole Belloubet visited the constituency in support of Montsarrat, the first of a series of ministers to visit the constituency to campaign, followed by Minister of Territorial Cohesion Jacques Mézard on 12 February, government spokesman Benjamin Griveaux on 15 February, and finally Christophe Castaner on 2 March. Castaner held a second public meeting, this time alongside Genevieve Darrieussecq, on 3 March, and Jean-Michel Blanquer and Gérard Collomb traveled to the constituency on 9 March. Local elected supporters, including deputy Mickaël Nogal and mayor of Rieumes Jennifer Courtois-Périssé, attended a public meeting with Montsarrat on 23 February.

Joël Aviragnet, a specialized educator, and Socialist Party (PS) mayor of Encausse-les-Thermes, also received the renewed support of his party, and was backed by Carole Delga, president of the regional council of Occitanie, who selected him as a substitute, with Aviragnet occupying her seat in the National Assembly from July 2014 to July 2015. Socialist deputy Valérie Rabault appeared at a public meeting on 20 February to back Aviragnet, who also benefited from the strength of local party activists. Henri Nayrou, president of the departmental council of Ariège, attended a public meeting with Aviragnet, who was later joined not only by Delga, but also by Georges Méric, president of the departmental council of Haute-Garonne, at a public meeting on 7 March. Over the course of the campaign, Aviragnet visited all 283 communes in the constituency. Marie-Claire Uchan, like Aviragnet, is a mayor, presiding over Saint-Bertrand-de-Comminges, and in a statement, almost 150 mayors in the constituency called upon voters to support Aviragnet. The movement Bastir Occitanie, which presented Jérôme Piques as its candidate in June 2017, decided to back Aviragnet in the by-election. Aviragnet held another public meeting with Delga and Méric on 14 March, and received the support of the French Communist Party (PCF) in the second round, as well as that of Génération.s, the movement of Benoît Hamon.

Philippe Gimenez, a financial comptroller, also returned to the field with the investiture of La France Insoumise. On 15 February, deputy François Ruffin toured the constituency in support of Gimenez, followed by a public meeting with Jean-Luc Mélenchon on 21 February, which was attended by nearly a thousand people. On 2 March, Liêm Hoang-Ngoc attended two public meetings with Gimenez, was joined by Clémentine Autain on 3 March, and followed by Caroline Fiat on 4 March. Deputy Alexis Corbière then visited on 6 and 7 March to campaign in support of Gimenez.

The selection of a candidate of The Republicans (LR) proved more difficult. Though Jennifer Courtois-Périssé, regional councillor and mayor of Rieumes, was considered the natural candidate in the constituency, she left the party to join La République En Marche!, in which she held a national leadership position. Party members then sought president of the LR regional federation and former deputy Laurence Arribagé to run in the by-election, but were rebuked. However, recently elected president of the party Laurent Wauquiez made clear his desire to present a candidate in the constituency, and his entourage sought to bypass the regional federation in the investiture process. Philippe Maurin, a 63-year-old resident of Luchon who served as deputy mayor of Montauban under Brigitte Barèges from 2008 to 2014, was ultimately selected as the party's candidate on 16 January. On 6 March, Christian Jacob, president of The Republicans group in the National Assembly, traveled to the constituency to offer his backing to the candidacy of Maurin.

The National Front (FN) also declared its intent to present a candidate within the constituency, with regional councillor Marie-Christine Parolin, an administrative agent, again invested by the party. After a public meeting with deputy Gilbert Collard on 28 January, she appeared alongside party president Marine Le Pen and deputy Louis Aliot on 3 March.

Corinne Marquerie, a retired educator, also returned as the candidate of the PCF, and was joined by Member of the European Parliament Marie-Pierre Vieu at a public meeting on 1 March. On 1 February, Nicolas Dupont-Aignan, president of Debout la France, presented 49-year-old former LR member Sébastien Broucke, a principal education adviser from Saint-Gaudens, as the party's candidate, with the party's candidate in June, Laure Gonzalez, initially selected as his substitute; however, Gonzalez withdrew for personal reasons, and was replaced by campaign coordinator Jean-Claude Bringuier. Mayor of Ore Hervé Minec stood as the candidate of the Popular Republican Union (UPR), with party president François Asselineau visiting in support. Marie-Cécile Seigle-Vatte, a retired professor of economics and management, stood for Europe Ecology – The Greens (EELV). Starting in 1983, she served several mandates as a municipal councillor, including in Fonsorbes, Saint-Denis de la Réunion, and Agassac. A member of the party's federal council and regional executive office, she received the support of Julien Bayou, national spokesman for the EELV, in a visit to the constituency on 1 March. Martine Guiraud, a laboratory technician, stood for Lutte Ouvrière (LO), and Francis Meynier for the European Alliance for Peace, Prosperity, Sharing.

The campaign centered around the themes of rurality and agriculture in the Comminges region, the preservation of public services (including the threatened closure of the court in Saint-Gaudens, and issues of transport, access to digital and medical services, and housing. Candidates also discussed the reopening of the Montréjeau–Luchon railway line, restoration of ski stations (including the planned restoration of the Luchon gondola), and installation of telephone towers in isolated municipalities.

Before the first round, Gimenez proposed a public debate against Montsarrat; though the latter suggested that it was "healthy to debate", he postponed making a decision until after returning from the Paris International Agricultural Show. He ultimately declined, and indicated that while he was open to the idea, he believed that the proposal was not made in good faith, viewing the exclusion of the PS candidate as an effort to claim the flag of the "true anti-Macron opposition". On 14 March, 100% Radio, ViàOccitanie, and La Dépêche du Midi hosted a debate moderated by Olivier Roirand and Brice Vidal between Aviragnet and Montsarrat from 19:00 to 20:00 CET.

== 2017 election result ==
First round results by commune

Second round results by commune

Candidate	Party	First round		Second round	
Candidate	Party	Votes	%	Votes	%
Michel Montsarrat	LREM	14,541	33.40	17,179	49.87
Joël Aviragnet	PS	7,739	17.78	17,270	50.13
Marie-Christine Parolin	FN	6,630	15.23		
Philippe Gimenez	LFI	6,142	14.11		
Jean-Luc Rivière	UDI	3,802	8.73		
Corinne Marquerie	PCF	1,346	3.09		
Sophie Handschutter	EELV	1,220	2.80		
Laure Gonzalez	DLF	616	1.41		
David Labarre	R!	510	1.17		
Jérôme Piques	PNO	345	0.79		
Martine Guiraud	LO	293	0.67		
Kévin Redondo	UPR	278	0.64		
Véronique Miralles	AEI	73	0.17		
Votes		43,535	100.00	34,449	100.00
Valid votes		43,535	96.59	34,449	85.41
Blank votes		1,030	2.29	3,671	9.10
Null votes		509	1.13	2,212	5.48
Turnout		45,074	52.76	40,332	47.21
Abstentions		40,358	47.24	45,094	52.79
Registered voters		85,432		85,426	
Source: Ministry of the Interior, political parties

== 2018 by-election result ==
Candidate	Party	First round			Second round		
Candidate	Party	Votes	%	+/–	Votes	%	+/–
Joël Aviragnet	PS	10,777	38.74	+20.96	17,156	70.30	+20.17
Michel Montsarrat	LREM	5,651	20.31	–13.09	7,247	29.70	–20.17
Philippe Gimenez	LFI	3,623	13.02	–1.08			
Marie-Christine Parolin	FN	3,264	11.73	–3.50			
Philippe Maurin	LR	1,374	4.94	–3.79			
Marie-Cécile Seigle-Vatte	EELV	878	3.16	+0.35			
Corinne Marquerie	PCF	733	2.63	–0.46			
Sébastien Broucke	DLF	706	2.54	+1.12			
Hervé Minec	UPR	297	1.07	+0.43			
Guy Jovelin	PDF	270	0.97	+0.97			
Martine Guiraud	LO	244	0.88	+0.20			
Francis Meynier	DIV	2	0.01	+0.01			
Votes		27,819	100.00	–	24,403	100.00	–
Valid votes		27,819	94.82	–1.76	24,403	86.54	+1.13
Blank votes		1,518	5.28	+1.76	2,000	7.09	–2.01
Null votes		1,518	5.28	+1.76	1,794	6.36	+0.88
Turnout		29,337	34.41	–18.35	28,197	33.08	–14.13
Abstentions		55,916	65.59	+18.35	57,032	66.92	+14.13
Registered voters		85,253			85,229		
Source (1st round): Préfecture de la Haute-Garonne, Ministère de l'Intérieur; Second round: Préfecture de la Haute-Garonne, Ministère de l'Intérieur
