= Anarchist-Communist Federation of Occitania =

Political organization in Occitania

Anarchist-Communist Federation of Occitania Federacion Anarquista Comunista d'Occitània
- Founder: Guy Malouvier
- Founded: 1969
- Dissolved: 1976
- Split from: Revolutionary Anarchist Organization
- Newspaper: Occitania Libertaria
- Ideology: Anarchist communism; Occitan nationalism
- Political position: Far-left

The Anarchist-Communist Federation of Occitania (Occitan: Federacion Anarquista Comunista d'Occitània, FACO) was an Occitan anarchist communist organization, founded by Guy Malouvier, which operated in Occitania from 1969 to 1976.

== History ==
=== Founding ===
The FACO emerged in the wake of the May 68 events, as the question of France's minority nationalities became an increasing subject of debate within the French anarchist movement. The FACO was established in 1969. It was founded by Guy Malouvier, a member of the Revolutionary Anarchist Organization (ORA), together with the Occitan language singer Joan Pau Verdier and Provençal journalist Gérard Bodinier. Malouvier's defence of Occitan nationalism provoked an internal debate within the ORA, causing its group in Marseille, which favoured class struggle over national liberation, to break away from the FACO. He ended up resigning from the ORA in 1971, in order to dedicate himself more fully to organising the FACO.

The FACO was one of several Occitan political organizations that were active during the 1970s, at a time when anti-colonialism was a popular theme among Occitan groups and in Occitan literature. The FACO, which consisted of 15 groups and included almost 100 active members, formed links with other Occitan nationalist groups, including the Partit de la Nacion Occitana. Unlike other Occitan nationalists, such as François Fontan, who advocated for the standardisation of the Occitan language, the FACO defended linguistic pluralism, considering attempts to standardise the language a form of "Occitan Jacobinism." It flew the anarchist red-and-black flag, with an Occitan cross emblazoned on the red section, and marched with other anarchist organizations at political demonstrations.

In 1970, it began publishing its journal, Occitania libertaria. Its headquarters were established at 33 Rue des Vignoles, in Paris, which it was forced to share with the ORA. The publication allowed its writers to print works in their own vernaculars and dialects, including Gascon, Lemosin and Provençau. It published four issues between 1970 and 1972: its first issue was published in 1970, its second in 1971, and its third and fourth in 1972. It published its fifth issue in 1973 and its sixth issue in 1974. It ceased publication in 1975, with its eighth and final issue.

The FACO sympathised with the Basque nationalist organization Euskadi Ta Askatasuna (ETA), which was engaged in an armed conflict against Francoist Spain. It also had relations with the Basque anarchist magazine Askatasuna, which reestablished the Confederación Nacional del Trabajo (CNT) in Euskadi during the Spanish transition to democracy.

Throughout its existence, FACO was unable to build a sustainable permanent membership; shortly after Malouvier left in 1976, the organization dissolved. Malouvier himself ceased anarchist political activity soon after, due to the hostility expressed by the ORA towards Occitan national liberation. Following the 1978 French legislative election, the writer Joan Ganhaire also decided to drop out of politics, as he had been offended by what he saw as extremist tendencies within the Occitan nationalist movement, represented mainly by the FACO.

== Political ideology ==
The FACO's stated aim was to bring together all the "colonised people" of Metropolitan France into a united front. Its members advocated for a synthesis of libertarian communism with Occitan nationalism, calling for France to be transformed from a unitary state into a "socialist federation of regions", in contrast to the centralist aspirations of the French Jacobins.

== Bibliography ==
- Caerléon, Ronan (1973). Les bretons le dos au mur: Le FLB devant la Cour de sûreté de l'État (in French). La Table Ronde. ISBN 271039362X.
- Evans, David; Williams, Heather (2021). "New Dialogues with Breton Literature and Culture". Nottingham French Studies. 60 (2): 1–17. doi:10.3366/nfs.2021.0313. hdl:10023/23769. ISSN 0029-4586.
- Garnerin, Fabienne (2020). Jean Ganiayre/Joan Ganhaire: entre rire et désespoir, un regard occitan sur l'humaine condition (Thesis) (in French). Université Paul Valéry-Montpellier III.
- Garnerin, Fabienne (2023). Joan Ganhaire: Entre rire et désespoir, un regard occitan sur l'humaine condition (in French). Presses universitaires de la Méditerranée. ISBN 978-2367815121.
- Davranche, Guillaume; Mariman, Grégoire (May 2008). "Dossier 68 : Rolf Dupuy et Guy Malouvier : " Chacun de ces mots comptait : organisation; révolutionnaire; anarchiste "" [File 68: Rolf Dupuy and Guy Malouvier: "Each of these words counted: organization; revolutionary; anarchist]. Alternative libertaire (in French). No. 173.
- Maitron, Jean; Droguet, Alain (1973). "La Presse anarchiste française de ses origines à nos jours" [The French anarchist press from its origins to the present day]. Le Mouvement social (in French) (83): 9–22. doi:10.2307/3807385. ISSN 0027-2671. JSTOR 3807385.
- Pla-Lang, Luisa (2008). Occitano in Piemonte: Riscoperta di un'identità culturale e linguistica? : Uno studio sociolinguistico sulla minoranza occitana piemontese. Peter Lang. ISBN 9783631559208.
- Priest, Kathryn (2008). "Oc-lite: Why aren't the Occitans more like the Catalans?". Sociolinguistica. 22 (1): 140–156. doi:10.1515/9783484605299.140.
- R.D. (4 August 2023). "MALOUVIER, Guy". Dictionnaire des militants anarchistes (in French).
- Turpin, Dominique (1987). La région (in French). FeniXX. ISBN 213077525X.
