= Agassac =

- Commune
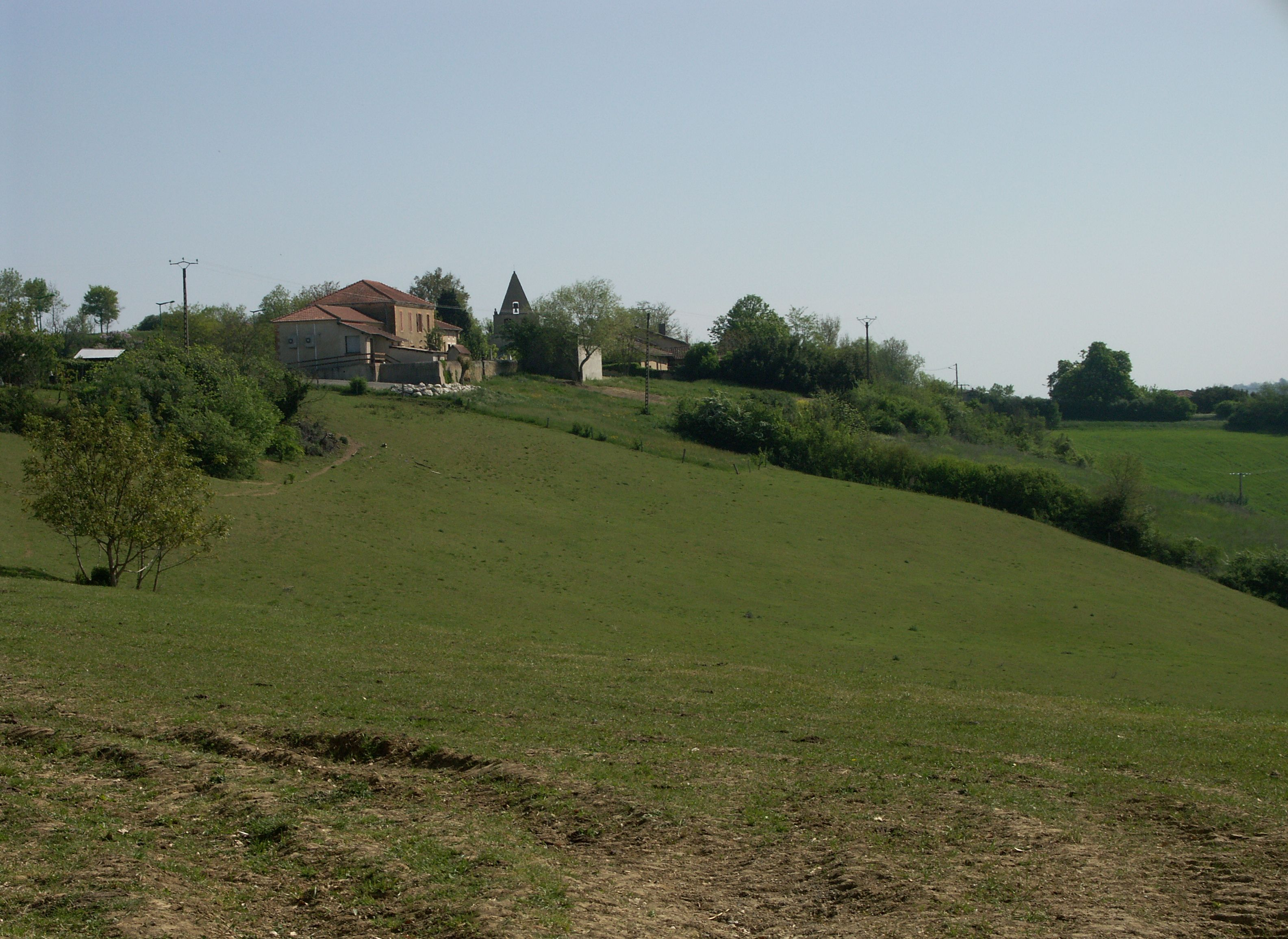
- A general view of Agassac
- Location of Agassac
- Location within France Location within Occitanie
- Coordinates: 43°22′20″N 0°53′18″E
- Country: France
- Region: Occitania
- Department: Haute-Garonne
- Arrondissement: Saint-Gaudens
- Canton: Cazères
- Intercommunality: Cœur et Coteaux du Comminges

Government
  - Mayor (2020–2026): Serge Ane
- Area^{1}: 9.58 km^{2} (3.70 sq mi)
- Elevation: 250 m (820 ft)
- Highest elevation: 336 m (1,102 ft)
- Lowest elevation: 197 m (646 ft)
- Population (2023): 115
  - Density: 12.0/km^{2} (31.1/sq mi)
- Time zone: UTC+01:00 (CET)
  - Summer (DST): UTC+02:00 (CEST)
- INSEE/Postal code: 31001 /31230
- ^{1} French Land Register data, which excludes lakes, ponds, glaciers > 1 km^{2} (0.386 sq mi or 247 acres) and river estuaries.

Agassac (French pronunciation: [aɡasak]) is a commune in the Haute-Garonne department in southwestern France.

== Geography ==
The commune is bordered by five other communes: Martisserre to the north, Mauvezin to the east, Castelgaillard to the south Coueilles to the southwest, and finally by L'Isle-en-Dodon to the west.

== Population ==
Historical population
Year	Pop.	±% p.a.
1968	181	—
1975	142	−3.41%
1982	119	−2.49%
1990	130	+1.11%
1999	121	−0.79%
2007	122	+0.10%
2012	114	−1.35%
2017	118	+0.69%
2023	115	−0.43%
Source: INSEE

== See also ==
- Communes of the Haute-Garonne department
