= Carole Delga =

French politician of the Socialist Party

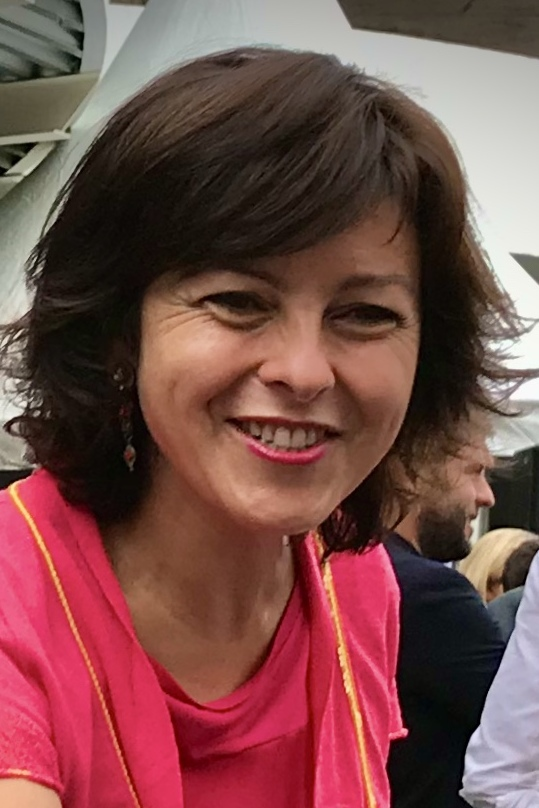

President of the Regional Council of Occitania
- Incumbent
- Assumed office 4 January 2016
- Preceded by: creation of the region Damien Alary (Languedoc-Roussillon); Martin Malvy (Midi-Pyrénées and acting)

Member of the National Assembly for Haute-Garonne's 8th constituency
- In office 18 July 2015 – 20 June 2017
- Substitute: Joël Aviragnet (2014–2015)
- Preceded by: Joël Aviragnet
- Succeeded by: Joël Aviragnet
- Parliamentary group: SRC (2015-2016); SER (2016-2017)
- In office 20 June 2012 – 3 July 2014
- Preceded by: Jean-Louis Idiart
- Succeeded by: Joël Aviragnet
- Parliamentary group: SRC

Secretary of State for Trade, Arts and Crafts, Consumption, and Social and Solidarity Economy
- In office 3 June 2014 – 17 June 2015
- President: François Hollande
- Prime Minister: Manuel Valls
- Preceded by: Valérie Fourneyron
- Succeeded by: Martine Pinville

Vice-president of the Regional Council of Midi-Pyrénées
- In office 26 March 2010 – 1st September 2012
- President: Martin Salvy
- Preceded by: Alain Beneteau
- Succeeded by: Viviane Artigalas

Mayor of Martres-Tolosane
- In office 16 March 2008 – 4 July 2014
- Preceded by: Brigitte Redinger
- Succeeded by: Gilbert Tarraube

Personal details
- Born: 19 August 1971 (age 55) Toulouse, France
- Citizenship: French
- Party: Socialist Party
- Education: Toulouse 1 University Capitole
- Profession: Local civil servant

Carole Delga (French pronunciation: [kaʁɔl dɛlɡa]; born 19 August 1971) is a French politician of the Socialist Party (PS) who has been serving as the President of the Regional Council of Occitania since 2016.

Delga is considered to be a potential candidate in the 2027 French presidential election.

== Political career ==
Delga has been a member of the Socialist Party since 2004.

=== Member of the National Assembly, 2012–2017 ===
From 2012 until 2017, Delga was a member of the National Assembly, where she served on the Finance Committee (2012–2014) and the Defence Committee (2015–2017).

In 2014, Delga briefly served as Secretary of State for Trade, Crafts, Consumer and Social Economy and Solidarity under Minister of Finance and Public Accounts Michel Sapin in the government of Prime Minister Manuel Valls; she replaced Valérie Fourneyron who had resigned for health reasons. In June 2015, she left the government to launch her campaign for regional elections; she was replaced by Martine Pinville.

=== President of Occitanie, 2016–present ===
Ahead of the Socialist Party's 2017 primaries, Delga publicly endorsed Manuel Valls as the party's candidate for the presidential election later that year. Since 2017, she has been part of the party's leadership.

Delga was re-elected in the 2021 French regional elections. Shortly after, she was also elected as president of Régions de France, a group representing the regions of France; it was the first time since 2016 that the association was led by a left-wing personality, and for the first time by a woman.

Ahead of the 2022 presidential election, Delga endorsed Anne Hidalgo as the Socialist Party's candidate. In 2023, she publicly endorsed Nicolas Mayer-Rossignol as candidate to challenge Olivier Faure for the party's leadership. During the 2025 party leadership election, she did the same, and threatened to leave the PS if Faure was elected party leader again. Shortly after Faure was elected again, Delga ultimately announced she would not quit the party after all, contrary to her earlier threat.

== Political positions ==
Delga is a critic of the New Ecological and Social People's Union.

== Controversy ==
In April 2019, Delga was sentenced by the Nîmes Court of Appeal to a fine of €8,000 and damages to the municipality of Beaucaire, Gard, for "discrimination based on political opinions" and "obstructing the exercise of an economic activity" after having refused to sign a city contract established by the municipality of Beaucaire led by Julien Sanchez, and not having chosen this municipality to host the future general high school built by the region in the Gard.
