= Revolutionary Anarchist Organization =

French political organization active in the 1970s

Revolutionary Anarchist Organization Organisation révolutionnaire anarchiste
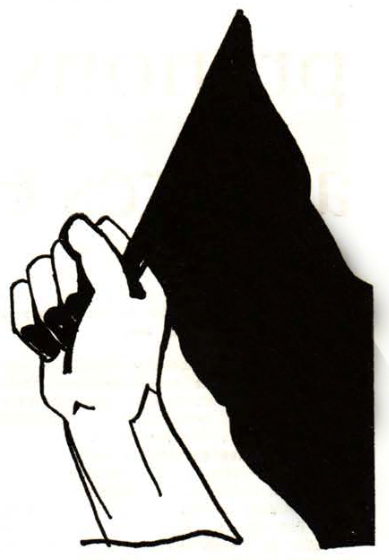
- Abbreviation: ORA
- Founded: 1967
- Dissolved: April 1976
- Split from: Anarchist Federation
- Succeeded by: OCL, UTCL
- Headquarters: 13th arrondissement of Paris
- Newspaper: L'Insurgé
- Ideology: Libertarian communism
- Political position: Far-left

The Revolutionary Anarchist Organization (French: Organisation révolutionnaire anarchiste, ORA) was a French libertarian communist organization that was active during the 1970s.

== History ==
In 1967, young libertarian communists began to coalesce within the Anarchist Federation (FA) and created within it a new organized tendency: the Revolutionary Anarchist Organization (ORA), which published the sheet, L'Insurgé. Not long after its foundation, the ORA participated in the events of May 68, with their members distributing leaflets and some even fighting on the barricades, but its activities were largely disorganized and lacking in strategy.

From November 1968, the ORA gradually began to separate itself from the Anarchist Federation to become a specific organization, driven by the generational divide between the ORA's younger members and the FA's older membership, many of whom were exiles from Spain and Bulgaria. The ORA eventually withdrew from the International of Anarchist Federations (IFA), leaving the FA to become the IFA's French section. With a certain amount of international coordination, they quickly established branches in the United Kingdom, Italy, Denmark and Germany. They also formed links with former Red Guards that had fled China following their suppression during the Cultural Revolution, which brought the ORA into conflict with French Maoists.

In 1971, the ORA attempted a rapprochement with the Libertarian Communist Movement (MCL) led by Georges Fontenis, but this failed. A group from the MCL, led by Daniel Guérin, then joined the ORA, while other ORA groups left to join the MCL and gave birth to the first Libertarian Communist Organization (OCL-1). Some activists also left the ORA to join the Union of Marxist-Leninist Communists of France, while the FACO split from the ORA after disagreements relating to the question of nationality.

By this time, most of the founding members of the ORA had left and been replaced with a new generation of activists. Under the influence of Guérin, the ORA began to move towards libertarian Marxism and started to advocate for participation in trade unions. In 1974, the ORA reestablished the Parisian section of International Antifascist Solidarity, to support Iberian anarcho-syndicalists through the Portuguese and Spanish transition to democracy.

Finally, in April 1976, the ORA's Orleans congress resulted in its transformation into the Libertarian Communist Organization (OCL), while others split off to establish the Union of Libertarian Communist Workers (UTCL).

== Bibliography ==
- Biard, Roland (1976). Histoire du mouvement anarchiste (1945–1975). Paris: Éditions Galilée. ISBN 2-7186-0045-4. OCLC 924953001.
