= Haute-Garonne's 8th constituency =

Constituency of the National Assembly of France

- inline Constituency of the National Assembly of France

- Location of constituency in Department

- Location of Haute-Garonne in France
- Deputy: Joël Aviragnet; PS
- Department: Haute-Garonne
- Cantons: Aspet, Aurignac, Bagnères-de-Luchon, Barbazan, Boulogne-sur-Gesse, Cazères, Le Fousseret, L'Isle-en-Dodon, Montréjeau, Rieumes, Saint-Béat, Saint-Gaudens, Saint-Martory, Salies-du-Salat
- Registered voters: 86,059 (2024)

Haute-Garonne's 8th constituency is a French legislative constituency in Haute-Garonne.

A by-election was held within the constituency in 2018 after the election of Joël Aviragnet was annulled. This led to the election of Joël Aviragnet again. This means the constituency has been held continuously by the socialists since 1988.

== Deputies ==
Election	Deputy	Party
1988	Pierre Ortet	PS
1993	Jean-Louis Idiart	PS
1997	Jean-Louis Idiart	PS
2002	Jean-Louis Idiart	PS
2007	Jean-Louis Idiart	PS
2012	Carole Delga	PS
2017	Joël Aviragnet	PS
2018 by-election	Joël Aviragnet	PS
2022	Joël Aviragnet	PS
2024	Joël Aviragnet	PS

== Election results ==
=== 2024 ===
Candidate	Party	Alliance	First round			Second round		
Candidate	Party	Alliance	Votes	%	+/–	Votes	%	+/–
Loïc Delchard	RN		23,893	40.54	+18.70	27,665	48.13	+8.52
Joël Aviragnet	PS	NFP	21,751	36.90	+8.23	29,813	51.87	-8.52
Céline Laurenties-Barrere	HOR	Ensemble	9,227	15.65	-4.95			
Wilfried Serre	RES!		1,805	3.06	+0.01			
Lucie Viola	DIV		746	1.27	new			
Alain Peres	REC		728	1.24	-2.71			
Martine Guiraud	LO		536	0.91	+0.10			
Dominique Darrozés	REG		257	0.44	new			
Votes			58,943	100.00		57,478	100.00	
Valid votes			58,943	96.67	-0.64	57,478	93.29	+2.95
Blank votes			1,320	2.16	+0.41	2,706	4.39	-1.99
Null votes			711	1.17	+0.23	1,428	2.32	-0.96
Turnout			60,974	70.82	+17.07	61,612	71.59	+20.13
Abstentions			25,122	29.18	-17.07	24,447	28.41	-20.13
Registered voters			86,096			86,059		
Result			PS HOLD					

=== 2022 ===
Legislative Election 2022: Haute-Garonne's 8th constituency
Party	Candidate	Votes	%	±%
PS (NUPÉS)	Joël Aviragnet	12,920	28.67	-10.07
RN	Loic Delchard	9,843	21.84	+10.11
HOR (Ensemble)	Céline Laurenties-Barrere	9,281	20.60	+0.29
EELV	Annabelle Fauvernier*	7,900	17.53	N/A
REC	Yves Riere	1,782	3.95	N/A
DVD	Wilfried Serre	1,375	3.05	N/A
Others	N/A	1,963		
Turnout		46,309	53.75	+19.34
2nd round result
PS (NUPÉS)	Joël Aviragnet	24,191	60.39	-9.91
RN	Loic Delchard	15,867	39.61	N/A
Turnout		40,058	46.49	+16.41
PS hold				

* EELV dissident

=== 2018 by-election ===
Candidate	Party	First round			Second round		
Candidate	Party	Votes	%	+/–	Votes	%	+/–
Joël Aviragnet	PS	10,777	38.74	+20.96	17,156	70.30	+20.17
Michel Montsarrat	REM–UDI	5,651	20.31	–13.09	7,247	29.70	–20.17
Philippe Gimenez	FI	3,623	13.02	–1.08			
Marie-Christine Parolin	FN	3,264	11.73	–3.50			
Philippe Maurin	LR	1,374	4.94	–3.79			
Marie-Cécile Seigle-Vatte	EELV	878	3.16	+0.35			
Corinne Marquerie	PCF	733	2.63	–0.46			
Sébastien Broucke	DLF	706	2.54	+1.12			
Hervé Minec	UPR	297	1.07	+0.43			
Guy Jovelin	PDF	270	0.97	+0.97			
Martine Guiraud	LO	244	0.88	+0.20			
Francis Meynier	SE	2	0.01	+0.01			
Votes		27,819	100.00	–	24,403	100.00	–
Valid votes		27,819	94.82	–1.76	24,403	86.54	+1.13
Blank votes		1,518	5.28	+1.76	2,000	7.09	–2.01
Null votes		1,518	5.28	+1.76	1,794	6.36	+0.88
Turnout		29,337	34.41	–18.35	28,197	33.08	–14.13
Abstentions		55,916	65.59	+18.35	57,032	66.92	+14.13
Registered voters		85,253			85,229		
Source (1st round): Préfecture de la Haute-Garonne, Ministère de l'Intérieur; Second round: Préfecture de la Haute-Garonne, Ministère de l'Intérieur

=== 2017 ===
Candidate	Label	First round		Second round	
Candidate	Label	Votes	%	Votes	%
Michel Montsarrat	REM	14,541	33.40	17,179	49.87
Joël Aviragnet	PS	7,739	17.78	17,270	50.13
Marie-Christine Parolin	FN	6,630	15.23		
Philippe Gimenez	FI	6,142	14.11		
Jean-Luc Rivière	UDI	3,802	8.73		
Corinne Marquerie	PCF	1,346	3.09		
Sophie Handschutter	ECO	1,220	2.80		
Laure Gonzalez	DLF	616	1.41		
David Labarre	DIV	510	1.17		
Jérôme Piques	REG	345	0.79		
Martine Guiraud	EXG	293	0.67		
Kévin Redondo	DIV	278	0.64		
Véronique Miralles	ECO	73	0.17		
Votes		43,535	100.00	34,449	100.00
Valid votes		43,535	96.59	34,449	85.41
Blank votes		1,030	2.29	3,671	9.10
Null votes		509	1.13	2,212	5.48
Turnout		45,074	52.76	40,332	47.21
Abstentions		40,358	47.24	45,094	52.79
Registered voters		85,432		85,426	
Source: Ministry of the Interior

=== 2012 ===
2012 legislative election in Haute-Garonne's 8th constituency
Candidate	Party	First round	
Candidate	Party	Votes	%
Carole Delga	PS	26,351	51.62%
Martine Rieu-Griffe	UMP	9,348	18.31%
Nadine Voloscenko	FN	6,288	12.32%
Patrick Boube	FG	5,144	10.08%
Michèle Constan	EELV	1,436	2.81%
Jacqueline Winnepenninckx-Kieser	MoDem	1,000	1.96%
André Pagnac	DLR	684	1.34%
Nicolas Motschwiller	AEI	368	0.72%
Martine Guiraud	LO	303	0.59%
Chantal Mondain	??	130	0.25%
Valid votes		51,052	97.81%
Spoilt and null votes		1,141	2.19%
Votes cast / turnout		52,193	61.48%
Abstentions		32,695	38.52%
Registered voters		84,888	100.00%

=== 2007 ===
Legislative Election 2007: Haute-Garonne's 8th constituency
Party	Candidate	Votes	%	±%
PS	Jean-Louis Idiart	20,813	40.41	
UMP	Françoise Boulet Ribet	14,291	27.75	
MoDem	Jean-Bernard Castex	4,422	8.59	
PRG	Josette Sarradet	2,847	5.53	
FN	Nadine Voloscenko	1,724	3.35	
PCF	Corinne Marquerie	1,657	3.22	
LV	Michel Roux	1,085	2.11	
Others	N/A	4,660		
Turnout		52,820	63.76	
2nd round result
PS	Jean-Louis Idiart	30,677	60.40	
UMP	Françoise Boulet Ribet	20,112	39.60	
Turnout		53,217	64.25	
PS hold				

=== 2002 ===
Legislative Election 2002: Haute-Garonne's 8th constituency
Party	Candidate	Votes	%	±%
PS	Jean-Louis Idiart	23,344	44.50	
UDF	Rene Rettig	9,519	18.15	
UMP	Josette Cazes	6,897	13.15	
FN	Nadine Voloscenko	4,706	8.97	
PCF	Corinne Marquerie	1,794	3.42	
CPNT	Bernadette Bouillon	1,559	2.97	
Others	N/A	4,638		
Turnout		53,946	68.16	
2nd round result
PS	Jean-Louis Idiart	29,934	60.82	
UDF	Rene Rettig	19,287	39.18	
Turnout		51,861	65.50	
PS hold				

=== 1997 ===
Legislative Election 1997: Haute-Garonne's 8th constituency
Party	Candidate	Votes	%	±%
PS	Jean-Louis Idiart	22,822	44.39	
RPR	Bernard Battle	12,857	25.01	
FN	Nadine Voloscenko	5,155	10.03	
PCF	André Marquerie	4,179	8.13	
DVD	Yves Rière	1,762	3.43	
LV	Germain Dodos	1,276	2.48	
LO	Pierre Vacher	1,076	2.09	
Others	N/A	2,280		
Turnout		54,617	70.55	
2nd round result
PS	Jean-Louis Idiart	34,111	63.52	
RPR	Bernard Battle	19,591	36.48	
Turnout		57,390	74.13	
PS hold				
