= Union of Libertarian Communist Workers =

Union of Libertarian Communist Workers Union des travailleurs communistes libertaires
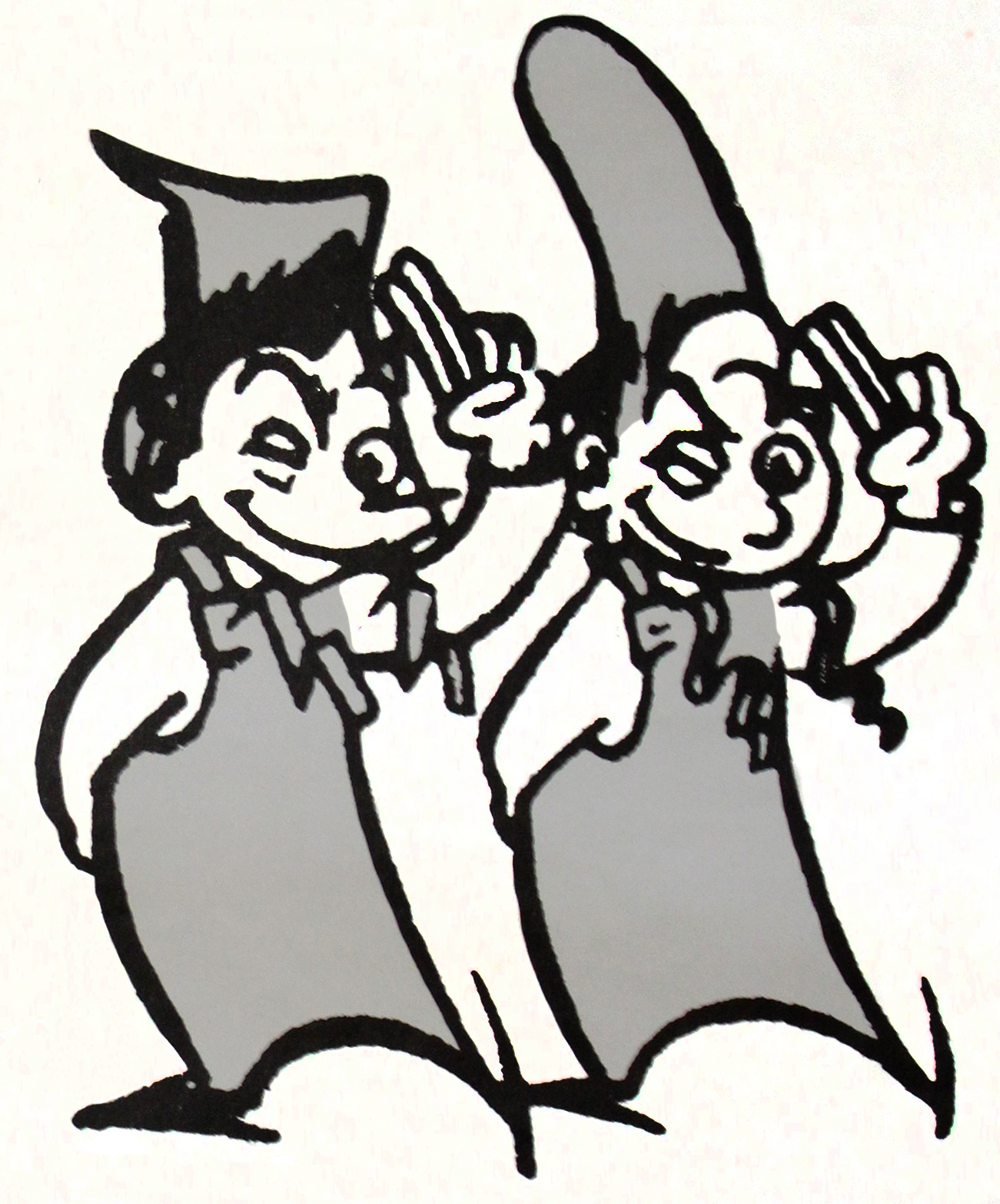
- Founded: February 1978
- Dissolved: June 1991
- Split from: Revolutionary Anarchist Organization
- Succeeded by: Alternative libertaire
- Newspaper: Tout le pouvoir aux travailleurs (1976-1982); Lutter! (1982-1991)
- Youth wing: Young Libertarian Collective
- Ideology: Anarcho-syndicalism; Libertarian communism
- Political position: Far-left

The Union of Libertarian Communist Workers (French: Union des travailleurs communistes libertaires, UTCL) was a political organization established in France and created in 1978 after splitting from the Revolutionary Anarchist Organization two years earlier. It was active until 1991, when Alternative libertaire was created.

== History ==
Following the 1974 strikes in the banks, the PTT and the railways, a revolutionary syndicalist tendency was formed within the Revolutionary Anarchist Organization (French: Organisation révolutionnaire anarchiste, ORA), called the Union of Libertarian Communist Workers (French: Union des travailleurs communistes libertaires, UTCL).

The UTCL trend reproached the ORA for its leftist and anti-syndicalist drift which kept it away from workplace activism. The UTCL wanted to re-anchor anarchism in the workers' movement and in syndicalism. At its April 1976 congress in Orleans, the ORA excluded the UTCL tendency, and renamed itself the Libertarian Communist Organization (French: Organisation communiste libertaire, OCL). In February 1978 the founding congress of the UTCL was held.

In 1979, the UTCL received the adhesion of Georges Fontenis and Daniel Guérin.

In 1980, UTCL merged with the Anarchist Combat Organization (French: Organisation combat anarchiste, OCA).

During the 1980s, UTCL activists found themselves at the helm of several left-wing CFDT unions, opposed to the “refocusing” of the confederation.

In 1986, the UTCL railway workers, including Henri Célié and Christian Mahieux, played an important role in triggering the winter strikes at the SNCF, which for the first time saw the appearance of coordinating strikers. In 1987, it was still activists from the UTCL who participated in the start of the teachers' strike. In 1988, one found them in the strikes of the Post office which led to the exclusion of several combative CFDT unions, and to the birth of SUD-PTT.

The UTCL was for 15 years one of the far-left organizations most at the forefront in the emergence of alternative trade unionism which was to result, after the refocusing of the CFDT, in the creation of new radical unions (SLT in Usinor- Dunkirk, SNPIT at Air Inter, CRC in health, SUD at PTT, etc.).

In 1991, the UTCL and the CJL dissolved themselves, and their activists join Alternative libertaire.

== Bibliography ==
- Rival, Théo (2013). Syndicalistes et libertaires. Une histoire de l'Union des travailleurs communistes libertaires (1974-1991). Paris: Éditions Alternative libertaire. ISBN 9782914933285. OCLC 859446411 – via Dissidences.
