= Bastir Occitània =

Pan-Occitanist movement in France

"Bastir!" (to Build), originally the "Manifeste Occitaniste" (the Occitanist Manifesto), now "Bastir Occitanie" (or "Bastir Occitània" in Occitan language), is a pan-Occitanist movement mainly involved in French municipal elections of 2014, in French departmental elections of 2015, in French legislative elections of 2017, 2022 and 2024, and in French regional elections of 2021.

Flag of Occitania

== The Occitanist Manifesto ==
In 2011, David Grosclaude, then elected Advisor of Aquitaine Regional Council, with some other members of the Occitan Party (POC), approached other activists in the Occitanist movement to develop a common project on the basis of shared values. Several preliminary meetings (Marmande, Pau, Villeneuve-sur-Lot) resulted in a programmatic outline: the "Manifeste Occitaniste", co-written in part with members of the Occitan Nation Party (PNO) and some actors from the Occitans cultural circle.

The meeting of 10 December 2011 in Barbaste summarized the previous assemblies and endorsed the idea of the "Manifeste Occitaniste". The manifesto was completed in 2012 and disseminated. Individual membership to its principles and approach require a personal online signature.

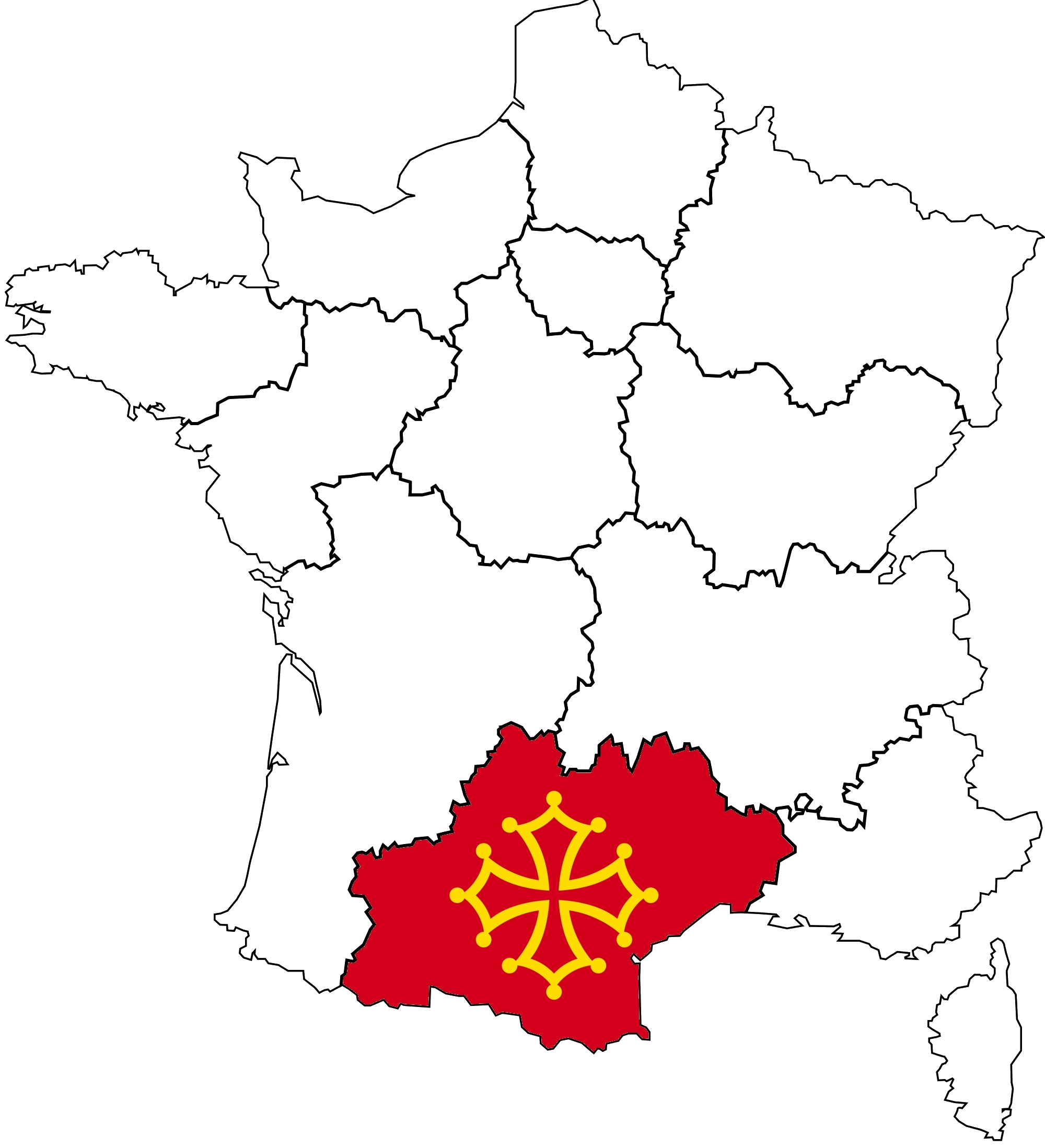
Occitanie (administrative region) – In May 2016, "Bastir Occitània" activists were mobilized in favor of the name "Occitanie" for the French administrative region born of the merger between "Languedoc-Roussillon" (Montpellier) with "Midi-Pyrenees" (Toulouse).

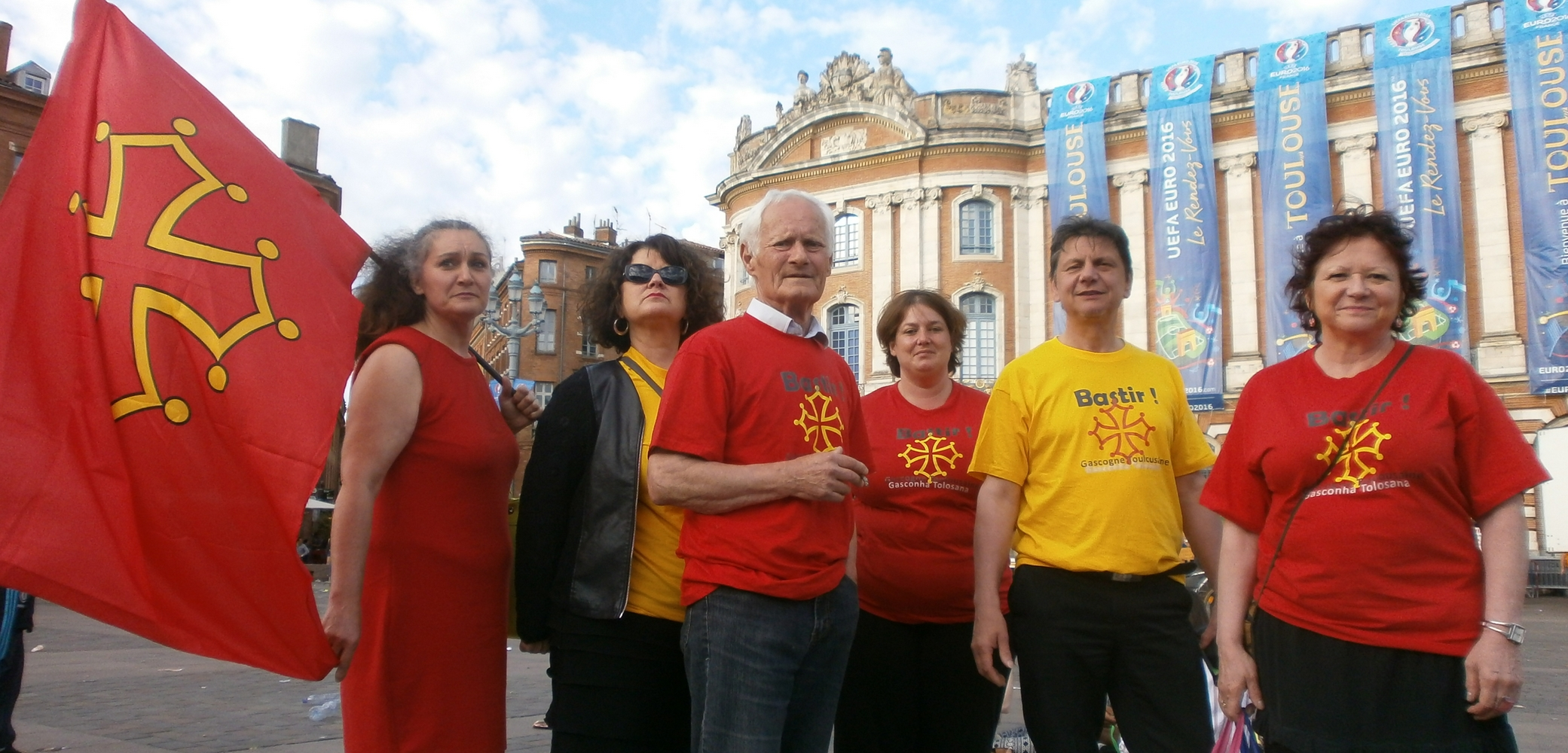
Bastir! in Toulouse during the campaign for the name of the French administrative region "Occitanie". Left: Dominique Darrozes. Right: Claire Daugé

The "Manifeste Occitaniste" at the beginning of 2013 was defined at that time as setting forth the basic elements of a political force in Occitania, without being a party, with an eye to the French municipal elections of 2014. Essentially, the "programmatic basis" of the "Manifeste Occitaniste" talked about conservancy and socialization of the Occitan language, regionalism, decentralization and direct democracy, environmental protection, and rejection of fascism.

Originally subtitled "Bastir la ciutat" ("build the city," figuratively in view of municipal elections), in 2013, the Occitanist Manifesto is simply renamed "Bastir" and stylized in "Bastir!".

A steering committee was established to specify and authorize nominations for the French municipal elections candidates of 2014. The steering committee had the especially difficult role of arbitrating disputed cases, particularly the incorrect requests for authorization of "Bastir!" candidates. Besides some applications from candidates identified as close to fascism, the steering committee had to exclude nomination applicants in cases where candidates were found on opposing lists.

The Steering Committee officially designated 116 "Bastir!" candidates for the French municipal elections of 2014, generally isolated candidates in various party ballots. The result of this was that in 2014, the candidates standing for "Bastir!" in 51 ballots were "authorized". This was the case for 44 candidates of the French Socialist Party, for 21 "ecologist" candidates (Europe Ecology – The Greens), for 11 "centrist" candidates, for 9 of the "Left Front", for one of the "Union for a Popular Movement" (Gaullist conservative and liberal party), and for one in a "various" ballot (liberal and conservative).

Although the majority of "Bastir!" candidates are isolated or small groups within conventional lists, there was the case of L'Isle-Jourdain (Toulouse Gascony) where a full ballot list for "Bastir!" was composed of certified candidates. This list, headed by Jean-Luc Davezac, had 20 certified occitanists candidates "Bastir!" of 29 members in total.

== The French municipal elections of 2014 ==
The French municipal elections of 2014 result in the election of 55 candidates standing for "Bastir!". In Toulouse Gascony, the list "Alternative L'Isle-Jourdain" had to share 12.43% of votes cast in the first round with the list "L'Isle du Futur" (conservatives and liberals, 39.52%) and the outgoing municipal majority (socialists, 48.04%).

By merging into a temporary alliance for the second round with the conservative list "L'Isle du Futur", the list "Alternative L'Isle-Jourdain" elected only one woman who stood for "Bastir!". The socialist list of the outgoing municipal majority got the victory in the second round (53.68% of votes).

In the nearby town of Saint-Lys, "Bastir!" got two opposition members elected in the list "L'Alternative pour Saint-Lys" (including a former mayor of this little town, Patrick Lasseube) list that she be close to victory only a few votes (35 votes difference: 49 51% of the votes against 50.48% for the socialist list of the outgoing municipal majority).

Some "Bastir!" candidates were elected in major cities of Occitania as well: in Auch (Henri Chavarrot, Benedicte Mello, Nadia Baitiche, Rui Oliveira-Santos), Orange (Anne-Marie Hautant,) Montauban (Gael Tabarly), in Pau, Muret, Villeneuve-sur-Lot, Carmaux, Graulhet.

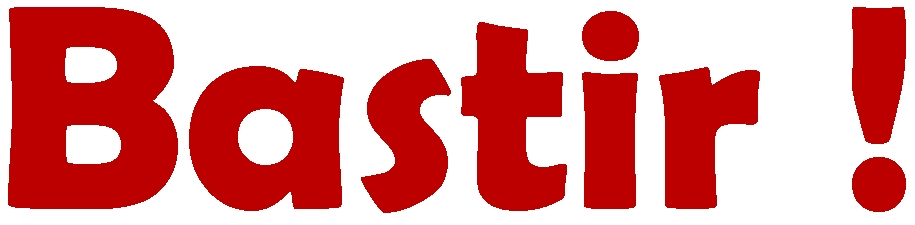
Original logo Bastir!

== The French departmental elections of 2015 ==
For departmental elections of 2015, the steering committee officially authorized only twenty Bastir! candidates, including the duo Marie-Christine Huby & Jean-Luc Davezac in the canton of L'Isle-Jourdain (group "Libres et Indépendants – Gers", founded during this election campaign), the centrist Patrick Lasseube (Democratic Movement) in the canton of Plaisance du Touch. In other areas, candidates engaged on ecologist lists (Europe Ecology – The Greens) or on the Occitan Party. There was no candidate elected "Bastir!" from these departmental elections. The failure of departmental elections has probably impacted negatively on the strength of "Bastir!" which did not want to invest in the regional elections of 2015, confining itself since the late departmental elections to modest local and spontaneous actions at the initiative of small groups or even individual members still claiming of this movement.

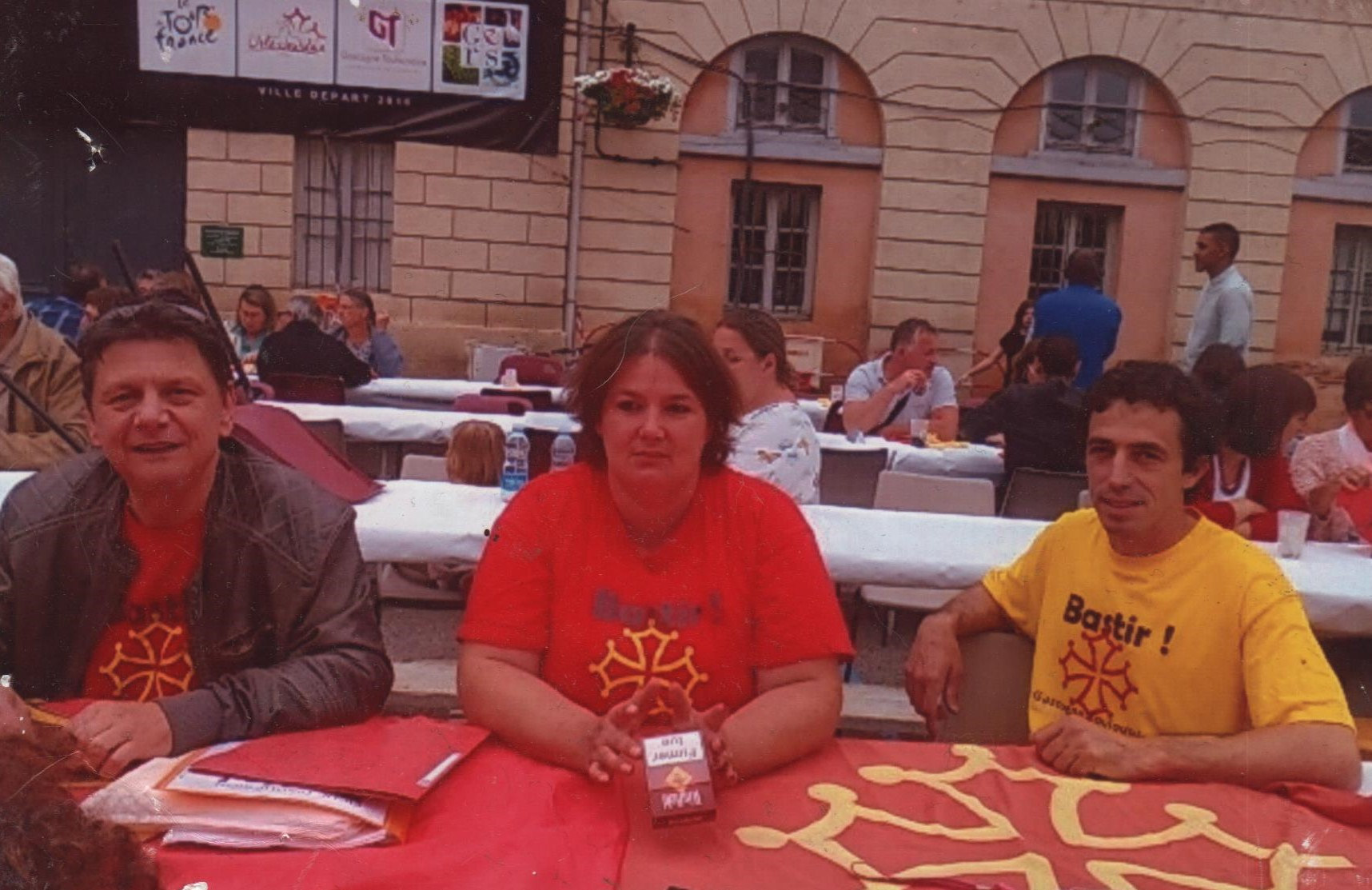
Bastir! activists, summer 2016. From left to right: Jean-Luc Davezac, Sylvie Bonnemaison, Jiròni Picas.

== The October 2016 Constituent Assembly of Bastir Occitania ==
The campaign of April to September 2016 by activists of "Bastir!" in Toulouse, east Gascony and south Quercy (French departments of Gers, Haute-Garonne and Tarn-et-Garonne) is a success: the historical denomination "Occitanie" wins the citizens consultation organized by the new Regional Council to find a name for the new region born from the merger of "Midi-Pyrenees" with the "Languedoc-Roussillon".

The weekend of October 14–16, 2016, during the Constituent Assembly of L'Isle-Jourdain (Toulouse Gascony), and following this recognition of the Occitan identity by the French government which agrees to call "Occitanie" one of an administrative regions of the Republic (September 29, 2016), the movement decides unanimously to change "Bastir!" in "Bastir Occitanie" (To Build Occitania).

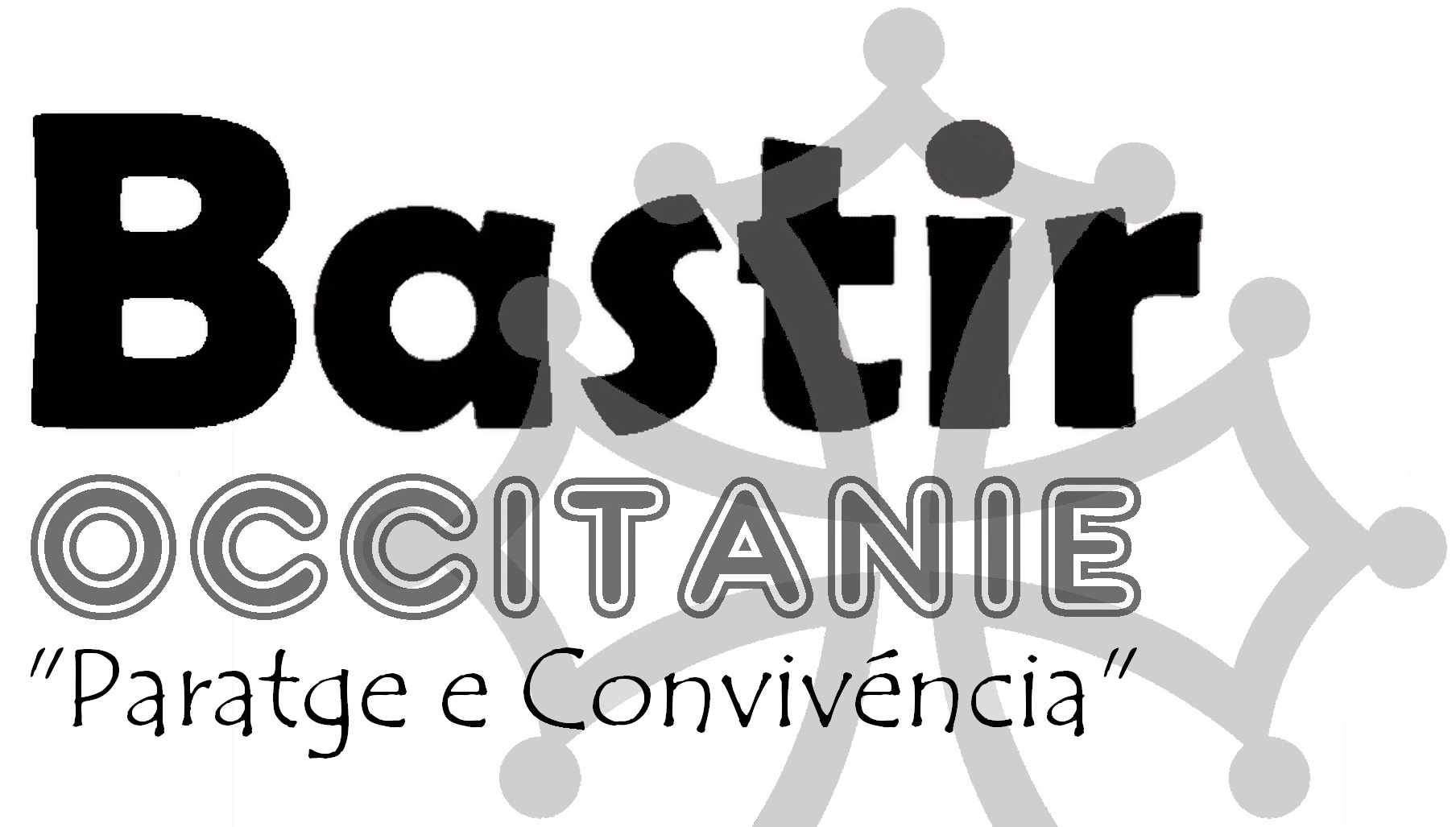
Logo Bastir Occitanie since 2016

== The French presidential and legislative elections of 2017 ==
For the French presidential election of 2017, Jean-Luc Davezac and several members of "Bastir Occitania" collaborated in the movement "En Marche!" in favor of Emmanuel Macron.

At the time of the legislative elections, the commission of investiture of the movement of Emmanuel Macron "En Marche!" in Paris unilaterally designates its own candidates in Occitania constituencies without taking into consideration the remarks of the local Occitan adherents: the contemptuous and strategic choice of Paris is considered particularly scandalous in Occitania in the department of Tarn-et-Garonne and in the second constituency of the Gers. "Bastir Occitania" then decides to supporting in the second constituency of Tarn-et-Garonne the presidential majority (but dissident) candidacy of Thierry Hamelin whose substitute is both close to "Bastir" and adherent to "En Marche!", and in vying with a legitimate "En Marche !" candidate on the 8th district of Haute-Garonne, the Occitanist candidacy of Jérôme Piques (Occitan Nation Party) in that constituency. In the second round, "Bastir Occitania" militates to block the candidates "En Marche!" in the first constituency of Tarn-et-Garonne and the second constituency of Gers: the two candidates of the movement of Emmanuel Macron are beaten by the candidates of the Socialist Party, outgoing deputies Valérie Rabault and Gisèle Biémouret. On the 8th constituency of Haute-Garonne, the Bastir Occitania candidates Jiròni Picas and Dominique Darrozes does not give a voting instruction for the second round: the candidate "En Marche" is beaten too in this constituency by the candidate of the Socialist Party Joël Aviragnet. Voters in the 8th constituency of Haute-Garonne must vote again following the cancellation of the election of Joel Aviragnet. This time, "Bastir Occitanie" supports him in the first and second rounds of the by-election are scheduled for 11 and 18 March 2018.

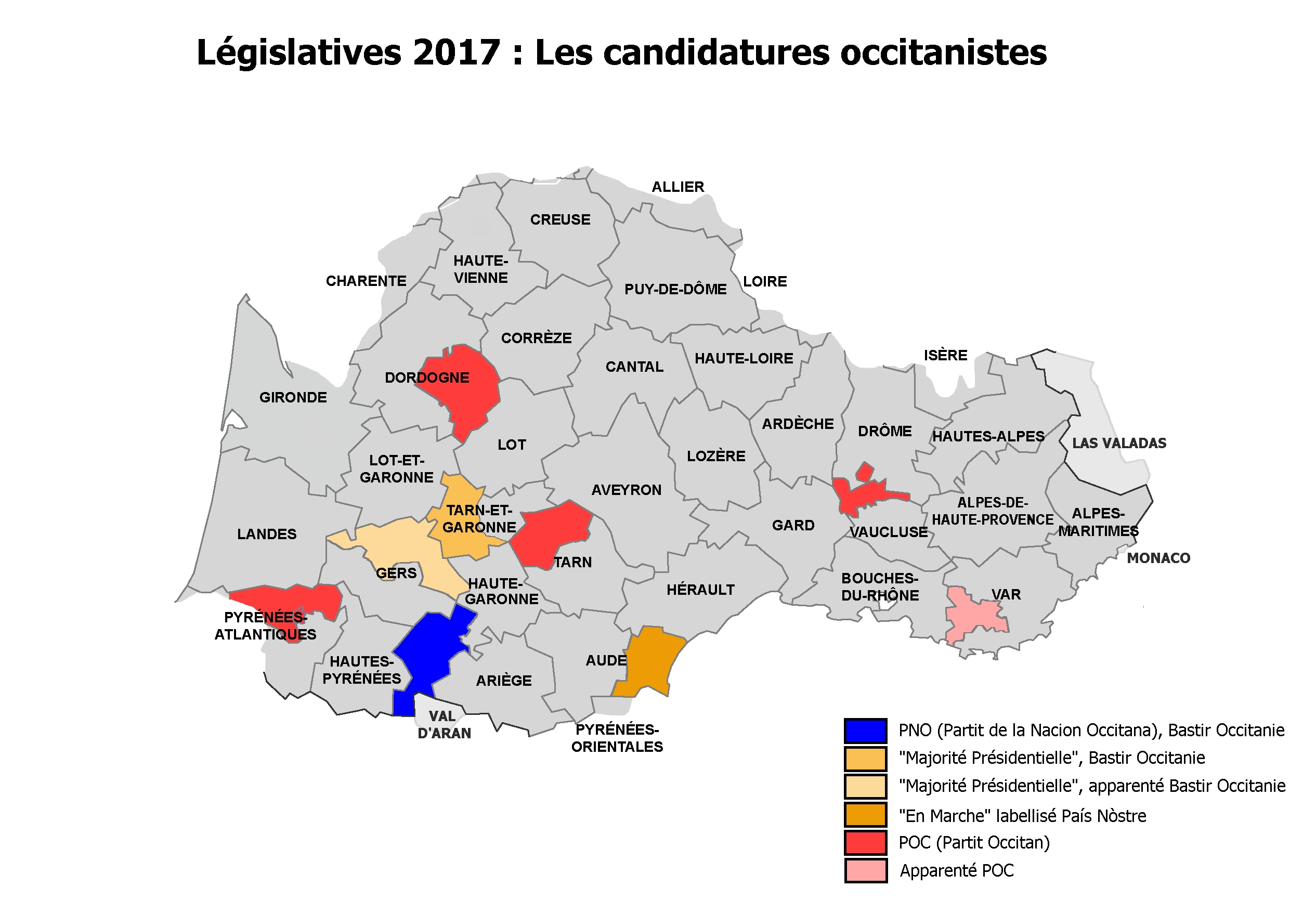
Occitanist candidatures in Occitania during the 2017 French parliamentary elections (Bastir Occitanie and related parties: Occitan Party, Occitan Nation Party, País Nòstre...)

As for those of Bastir Occitania who still remained loyal to President Macron, they now form a rather dissident left-wing and regionalist Occitan macronist group, opposed to the conservative and French centralist pro-Parisian trend of the official Emmanuel Macron movement "LaREM".

But in January 2019, Bastir breaks with macronism following the Blanquer reform project of the national education which has a negative impact on the teaching of the Occitan language.

== The November 10, 2018 Assembly in Toulouse of Bastir ==
The members of "Bastir" gathered in Toulouse on November 10, 2018, to go back to the municipal elections and perpetuate the presence of the movement in the municipalities. "Bastir" then announces an approach similar to 2014, an opening to all lists compatible with the Bastir charter (except the extreme right).

And while waiting for the municipal elections, "Bastir" supports the list of ecologists led by Yannick Jadot in the European elections of May 26, 2019. Finally, the labeling of candidates for these 2020 municipal elections will be finalized by Occitanie País Nòstre.

== The French regional elections of 2021 ==
In 2021, for the regional elections, Occitanie País Nòstre in alliance with other regionalist formations (Resistons!) and dissident ecologists presents its "Bastir" list in Occitanie. Jean-Luc Davezac was chosen by this league "Occitània ecologista e ciutadana" (ecological citizens of Occitania) to lead the list.

On January 15, 2022, "Bastir Occitanie" joins the Federation of United Countries ("Fédération des Pays Unis"), an alliance between five regionalist parties in France.

== The French legislative elections of 2022 ==
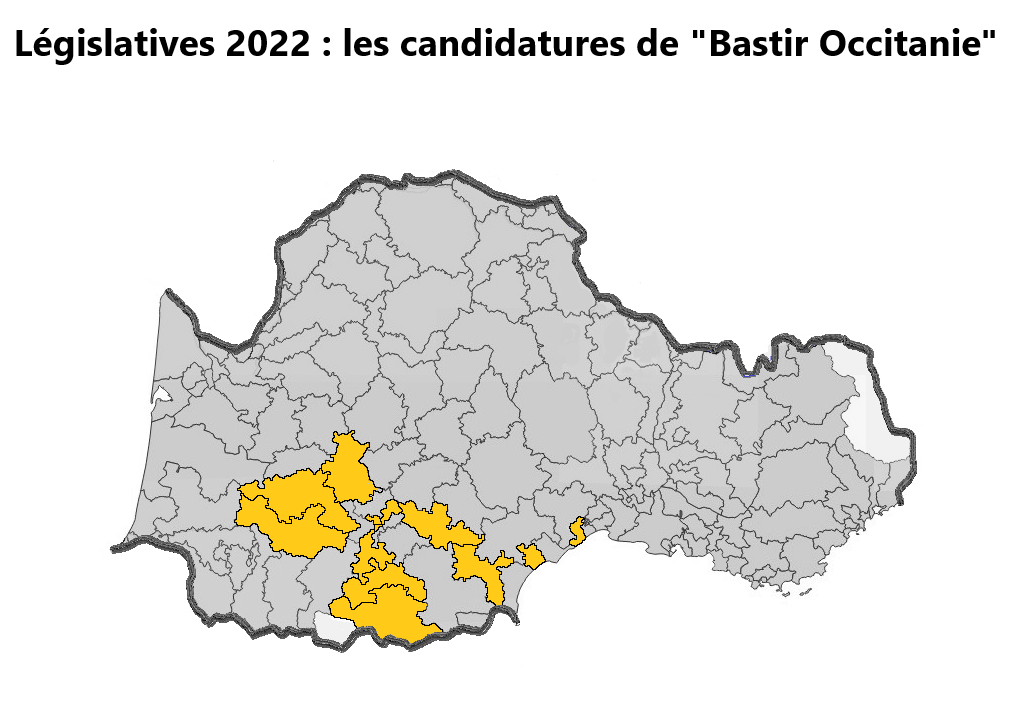
Bastir candidatures in Occitania during the 2022 French parliamentary elections

In the 2022 legislative elections, "Bastir Occitanie" presented 14 candidates, 13 in Occitania and one for the Occitan diaspora in Paris.

== The French european parliament elections of 2024 ==
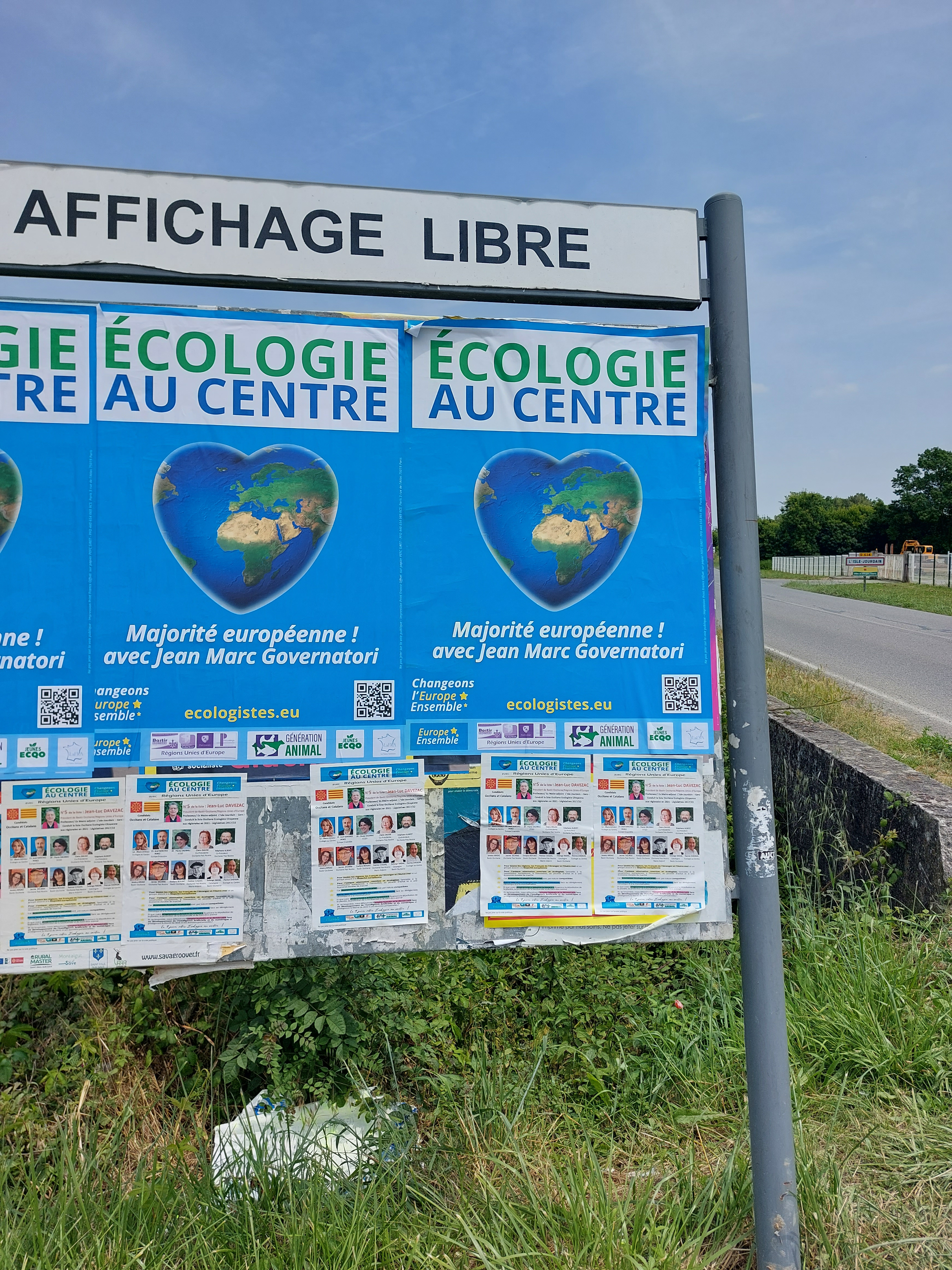
European Elections 2024: collage of posters in Occitania for the “Ecology at the center” list by “Bastir” activists.

For the 2024 European elections, members of "Bastir Occitanie" appear in the “Ecology at the center” (Écologie au centre) list led by Jean-Marc Governatori.

== The French legislative elections of 2024 ==
In the 2024 legislative elections, "Bastir Occitanie" presented 7 candidates in Occitania.

== 2026 French Senate elections ==
"Bastir Occitanie" is also fielding candidates for the 2026 Senate elections, notably a seven-person list named "Bastir Occitanie 31" (led by Jean-Luc Davezac) in Haute-Garonne. Bastir Occitanie also supports independent environmentalist candidate Laure-Nelly Amalric in the Aude department, as well the independent candidacy of Patrice Cuquel (with substitute Claire Daugé) in the Gers department.
