= Encausse-les-Thermes =

- Commune
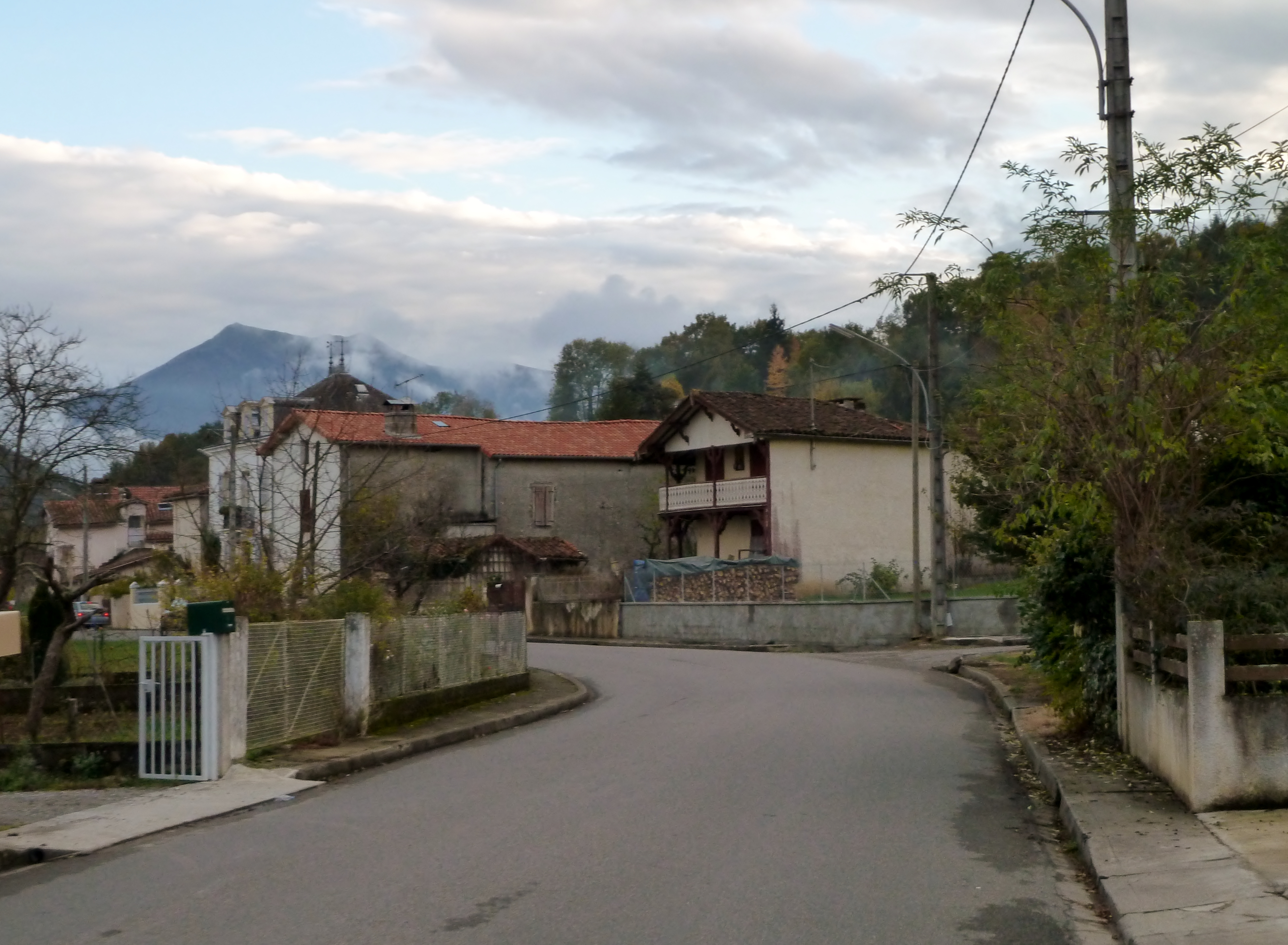
- A view within Encausse-les-Thermes
- Location of Encausse-les-Thermes
- Location within France Location within Occitanie
- Coordinates: 43°02′57″N 0°44′27″E
- Country: France
- Region: Occitania
- Department: Haute-Garonne
- Arrondissement: Saint-Gaudens
- Canton: Bagnères-de-Luchon

Government
  - Mayor (2020–2026): Marie-Laure Pellan-Deoux
- Area^{1}: 8.15 km^{2} (3.15 sq mi)
- Elevation: 365 m (1,198 ft)
- Highest elevation: 690 m (2,260 ft)
- Lowest elevation: 356 m (1,168 ft)
- Population (2023): 641
  - Density: 78.7/km^{2} (204/sq mi)
- Time zone: UTC+01:00 (CET)
  - Summer (DST): UTC+02:00 (CEST)
- INSEE/Postal code: 31167 /31160
- ^{1} French Land Register data, which excludes lakes, ponds, glaciers > 1 km^{2} (0.386 sq mi or 247 acres) and river estuaries.

Encausse-les-Thermes (Occitan: los Termes) is a commune in the Haute-Garonne department in southwestern France.

== Population ==
Historical population
Year	Pop.	±% p.a.
1968	546	—
1975	548	+0.05%
1982	523	−0.66%
1990	560	+0.86%
1999	591	+0.60%
2007	638	+0.96%
2012	681	+1.31%
2017	694	+0.38%
2023	641	−1.32%
Source: INSEE

== See also ==
- Communes of the Haute-Garonne department
