= Mauvezin, Haute-Garonne =

Mauvezin
- Commune
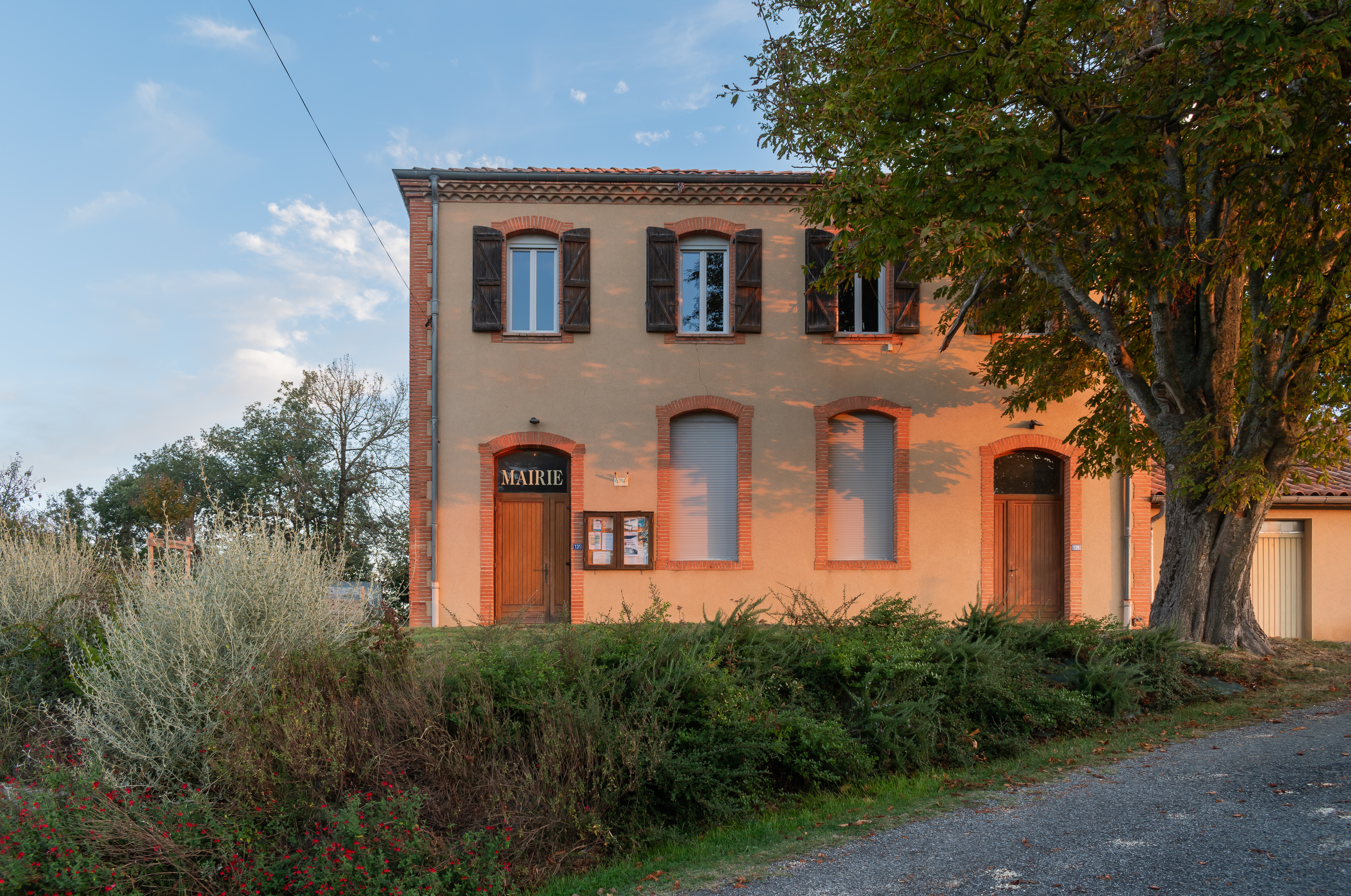
- Town hall of Mauvezin
- Location of Mauvezin
- Location within France Location within Occitanie
- Coordinates: 43°23′14″N 0°55′31″E
- Country: France
- Region: Occitania
- Department: Haute-Garonne
- Arrondissement: Saint-Gaudens
- Canton: Cazères

Government
  - Mayor (2020–2026): Thierry Plante
- Area^{1}: 4.76 km^{2} (1.84 sq mi)
- Elevation: 277 m (909 ft)
- Highest elevation: 316 m (1,037 ft)
- Lowest elevation: 192 m (630 ft)
- Population (2023): 82
  - Density: 17/km^{2} (45/sq mi)
- Time zone: UTC+01:00 (CET)
  - Summer (DST): UTC+02:00 (CEST)
- INSEE/Postal code: 31333 /31230
- ^{1} French Land Register data, which excludes lakes, ponds, glaciers > 1 km^{2} (0.386 sq mi or 247 acres) and river estuaries.

Mauvezin (French pronunciation: [mov(ə)zɛ̃]; Occitan: Mauvesin) is a commune in the Haute-Garonne department in southwestern France.

== Population ==
Historical population
Year	Pop.	±% p.a.
1968	99	—
1975	84	−2.32%
1982	79	−0.87%
1990	57	−4.00%
1999	48	−1.89%
2007	69	+4.64%
2012	86	+4.50%
2017	93	+1.58%
2023	82	−2.08%
Source: INSEE

== See also ==
- Communes of the Haute-Garonne department
