= Ore, Haute-Garonne =

Ore
- Commune
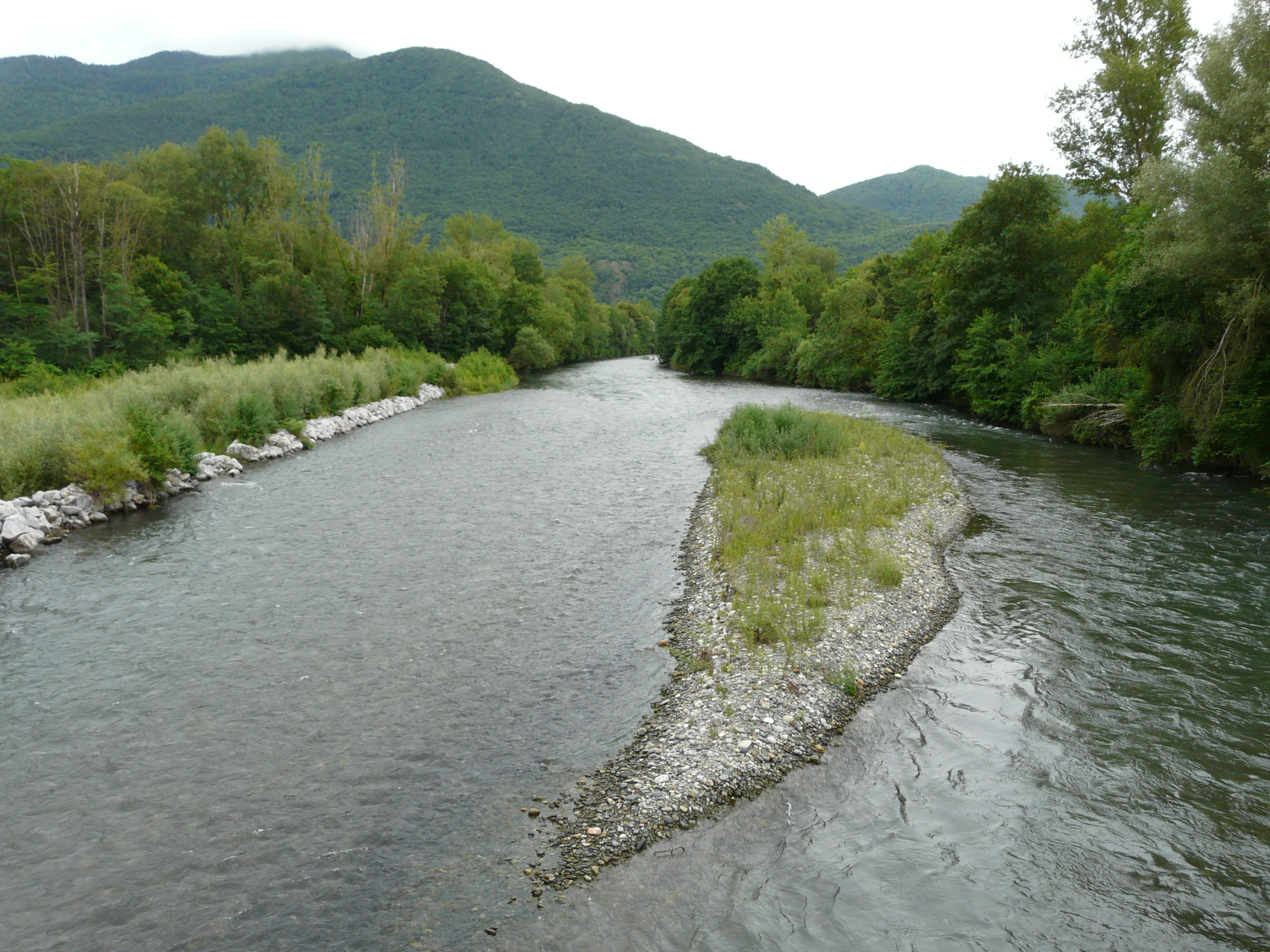
- The River Garonne in Ore.
- Location of Ore
- Location within France Location within Occitanie
- Coordinates: 42°58′34″N 0°39′04″E
- Country: France
- Region: Occitania
- Department: Haute-Garonne
- Arrondissement: Saint-Gaudens
- Canton: Bagnères-de-Luchon

Government
  - Mayor (2020–2026): Hervé Minec
- Area^{1}: 2.86 km^{2} (1.10 sq mi)
- Highest elevation: 724 m (2,375 ft)
- Lowest elevation: 453 m (1,486 ft)
- Population (2023): 120
  - Density: 42/km^{2} (110/sq mi)
- Demonym: Orois·e
- Time zone: UTC+01:00 (CET)
  - Summer (DST): UTC+02:00 (CEST)
- INSEE/Postal code: 31405 /31510
- ^{1} French Land Register data, which excludes lakes, ponds, glaciers > 1 km^{2} (0.386 sq mi or 247 acres) and river estuaries.

Ore (French pronunciation: [ɔʁ]; Occitan: Òra, pronounced [ˈɔɾo̞]) is a French commune in the department of Haute-Garonne, in the region of Occitania, southwestern France.

== Population ==
Historical population
Year	Pop.	±% p.a.
1968	143	—
1975	129	−1.46%
1982	122	−0.79%
1990	108	−1.51%
1999	109	+0.10%
2007	104	−0.59%
2012	123	+3.41%
2017	101	−3.86%
2023	120	+2.91%
Source: INSEE

== See also ==
- Communes of the Haute-Garonne department
