= François Fontan =

French politician

François Fontan (7 February 1929 – 19 December 1979) was a French politician. He was born into a family which came from Gascony. Raised in a monarchic family, he first joined a political party, the Mouvement Socialiste Monarchique when he was about 15, but he quickly gave up monarchism and became closer to anarchism, and, then, to communism, but he got fed up with their stalinism. He moved to Nice and created the Occitan Nationalist Party there. From 1962, Fontan often met professor Guy Héraud and developed the first clarification of the linguistic border between Occitan and Piemontese. He died in Cuneo.

He argues that states must create new borders, uniting each separate people within one country. In Africa especially, borders were created by European administrators and are not related to the various peoples. Creating new ethno-linguistic borders could avoid new massacres such as the one in Rwanda in 1994 between Tutsis and Hutus.

He wrote some books, explaining his ideas. Ethnisme is the most known.
