= Alternative libertaire =

Political organization in France

Alternative Libertaire
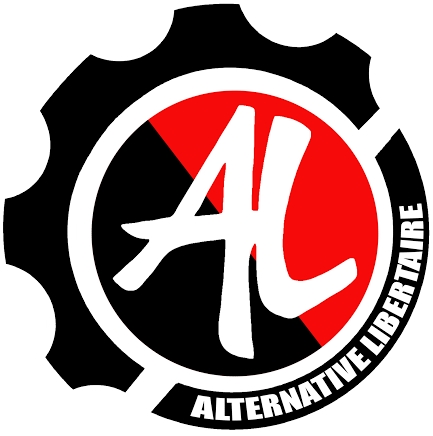
- Leader: Collective leadership
- Founded: 1991
- Dissolved: 10 June 2019
- Preceded by: Union of Libertarian Communist Workers
- Merged into: Libertarian Communist Union
- Headquarters: Paris
- Ideology: Anarcho-communism
- Political position: Far-left
- International affiliation: International Libertarian Solidarity
- Colours: Red, Black

Party flag

Website
- alternativelibertaire.org

Alternative libertaire (AL, "Libertarian Alternative") was a French anarchist organization formed in 1991 which publishes a monthly magazine, actively participates in a variety of social movements, and is a participant in the Anarkismo.net project. In 2019 the organization merged into the Union Communiste Libertaire (UCL, "Libertarian Communist Union")

Alternative Libertaire, now UCL, identifies with various tendencies within the libertarian socialist current of anarchism including anarcho-communism and anarcho-syndicalism. It was also a member of the International Libertarian Solidarity network.

== Ideology ==
The organization identifies with the revolutionary workers' movement drawn from the split in the First International (the International Workingmens' Association) in 1872. This was in opposition to the Marxists, whom Mikhail Bakunin regarded as authoritarian.

Alternative Libertaire's practical and ideological background has been summed up by the organisation as continuing from the following groups:

- Bakunin and his supporters within the First International.
- The revolutionary syndicalists of the French CGT before 1914.
- The Makhnovists, and the Organizational Platform proposed by the exiled Russian anarchists.
- Spanish anarcho-syndicalism, the Spanish Revolution 1936 and in particular the actions of the Friends of Durruti group.
- The Libertarian Communist Federation (FCL) and the Libertarian Communist Manifesto by Georges Fontenis in 1954.
- The Union des travailleurs communistes libertaires (Libertarian Communist Workers’ Union, UTCL), the works of Daniel Guérin and the Libertarian Communist Project of 1986.

== Activity ==
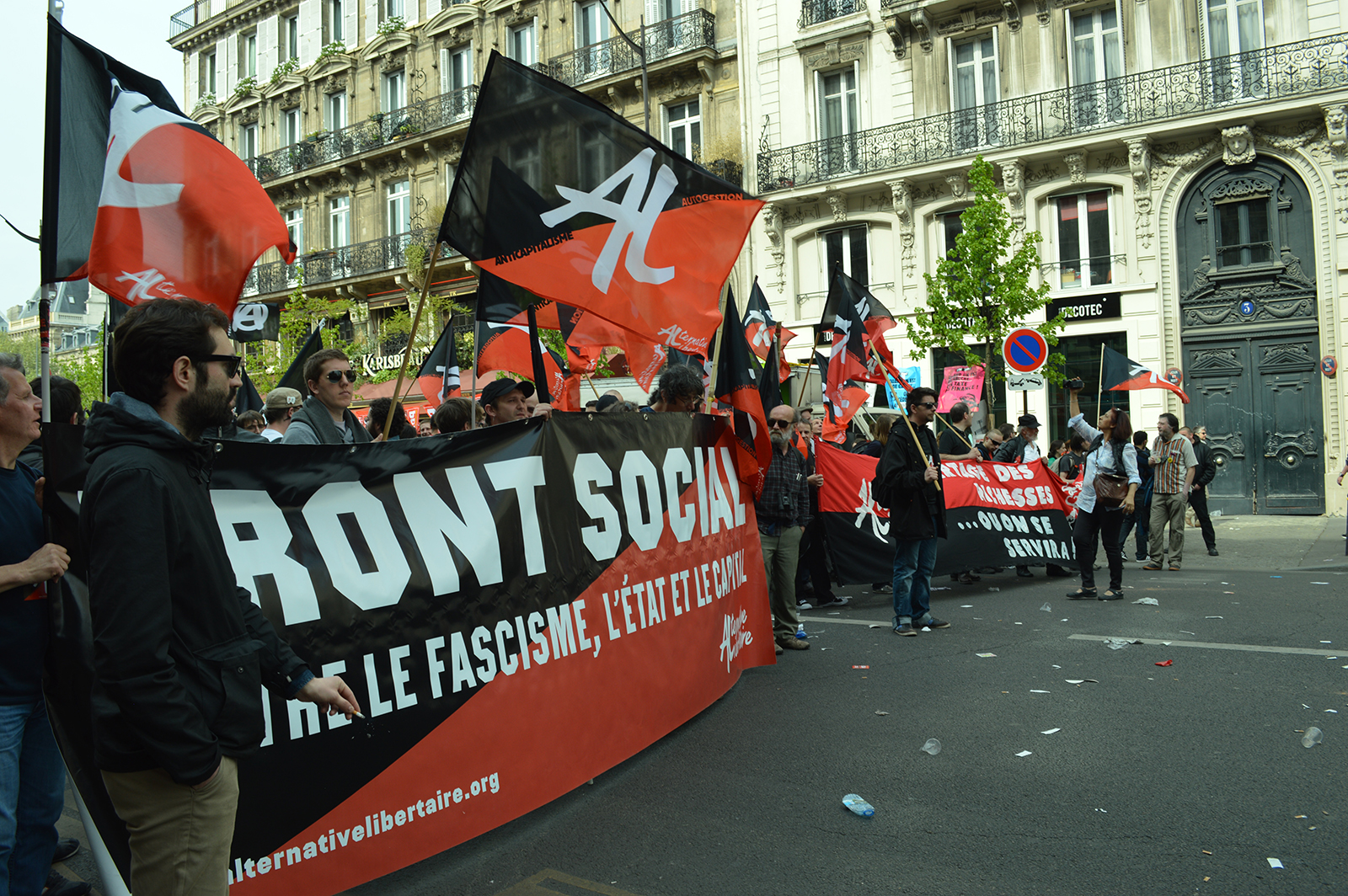
Alternative libertaire protest, Paris

Today Alternative Libertaire is developing its political action on two fronts:

- The building of an alliance of social movements, to give political weight to the politics of the people against the institutionalised left.
- The building of a libertarian communist current which fuels and is fuelled by the activities of the social movements.

AL militants are particularly involved in struggles in the workplace and in the unions, in the CGT or in SUD (sometimes in the CNT), in the fight against unemployment, for the right to housing, in the environmental movement and in the fight against patriarchy. Alternative Libertaire endeavours to link these conflicts in today's society with the perspective of a break with capitalism and the state.
