= Castelgaillard =

- Commune
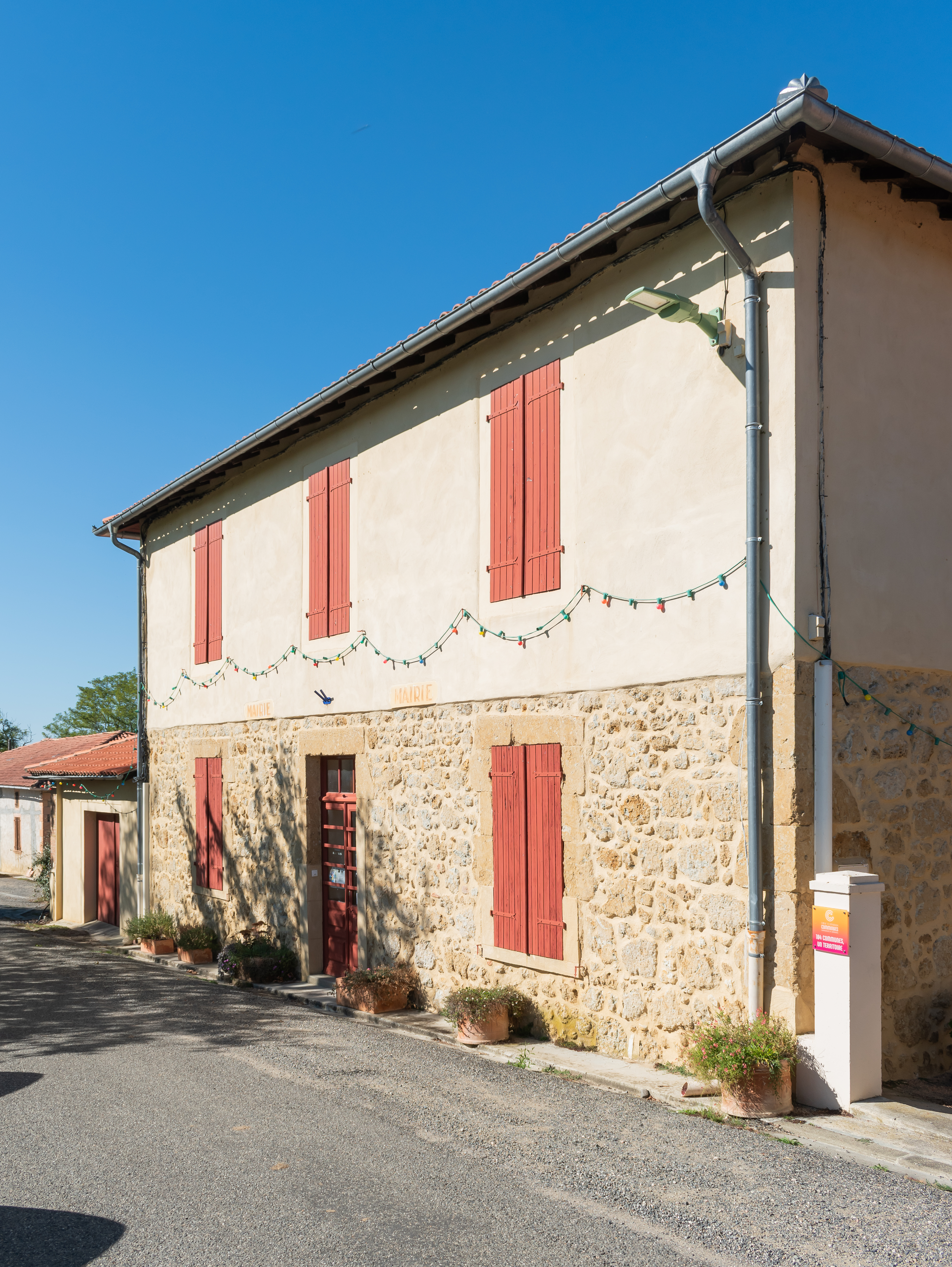
- Castelgaillard in 2023
- Location of Castelgaillard
- Location within France Location within Occitanie
- Coordinates: 43°21′19″N 0°54′06″E
- Country: France
- Region: Occitania
- Department: Haute-Garonne
- Arrondissement: Saint-Gaudens
- Canton: Cazères

Government
  - Mayor (2022–2026): Robert Duclos
- Area^{1}: 6.82 km^{2} (2.63 sq mi)
- Elevation: 330 m (1,080 ft)
- Highest elevation: 351 m (1,152 ft)
- Lowest elevation: 206 m (676 ft)
- Population (2023): 60
  - Density: 8.8/km^{2} (23/sq mi)
- Time zone: UTC+01:00 (CET)
  - Summer (DST): UTC+02:00 (CEST)
- INSEE/Postal code: 31115 /31230
- ^{1} French Land Register data, which excludes lakes, ponds, glaciers > 1 km^{2} (0.386 sq mi or 247 acres) and river estuaries.

Castelgaillard (French pronunciation: [kastɛlɡajaʁ]; Occitan: Castèthgalhard) is a commune in the Haute-Garonne department in southwestern France.

== Population ==
Historical population
| Year | Pop. | ±% p.a. |
|---|---|---|
| 1968 | 115 | — |
| 1975 | 100 | −1.98% |
| 1982 | 84 | −2.46% |
| 1990 | 67 | −2.79% |
| 1999 | 67 | +0.00% |
| 2007 | 54 | −2.66% |
| 2012 | 60 | +2.13% |
| 2017 | 61 | +0.33% |
| 2023 | 60 | −0.28% |
Source: INSEE

== See also ==
- Communes of the Haute-Garonne department
