= Jean-Louis Idiart =

French politician (1950–2022)

Jean-Louis Idiart (3 May 1950 – 30 November 2022) was a French politician who was a member of the National Assembly of France. He represented the 8th constituency of the Haute-Garonne department from 1993 to 2012 and was a member of the Socialiste, radical, citoyen et divers gauche.

Idiart died on 30 November 2022, at the age of 72.
