= Joël Aviragnet =

French politician

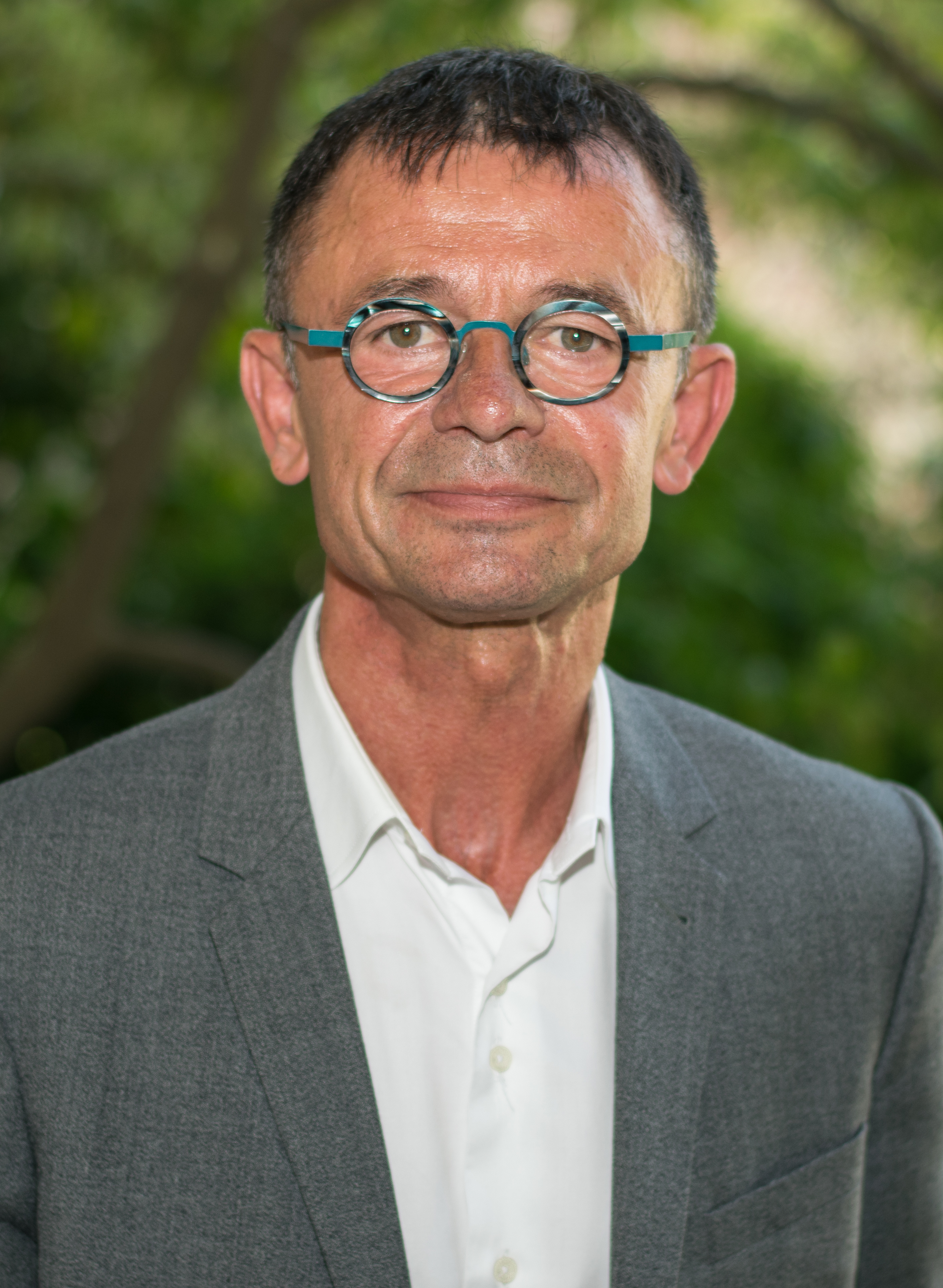
Joël Aviragnet in June 2017.

Joël Aviragnet is a French politician representing the Socialist Party. He was elected to the French National Assembly on 18 June 2017, representing the department of Haute-Garonne's 8th constituency. His election was annulled by the Constitutional Council, leading to a by-election in 2018 at which Aviragnet was elected again. He was re-elected in the 2022 election.

== See also ==
- 2017 French legislative election
- 2022 French legislative election
