= Partit de la Nacion Occitana =

Political party in southern France

Official flag of the party

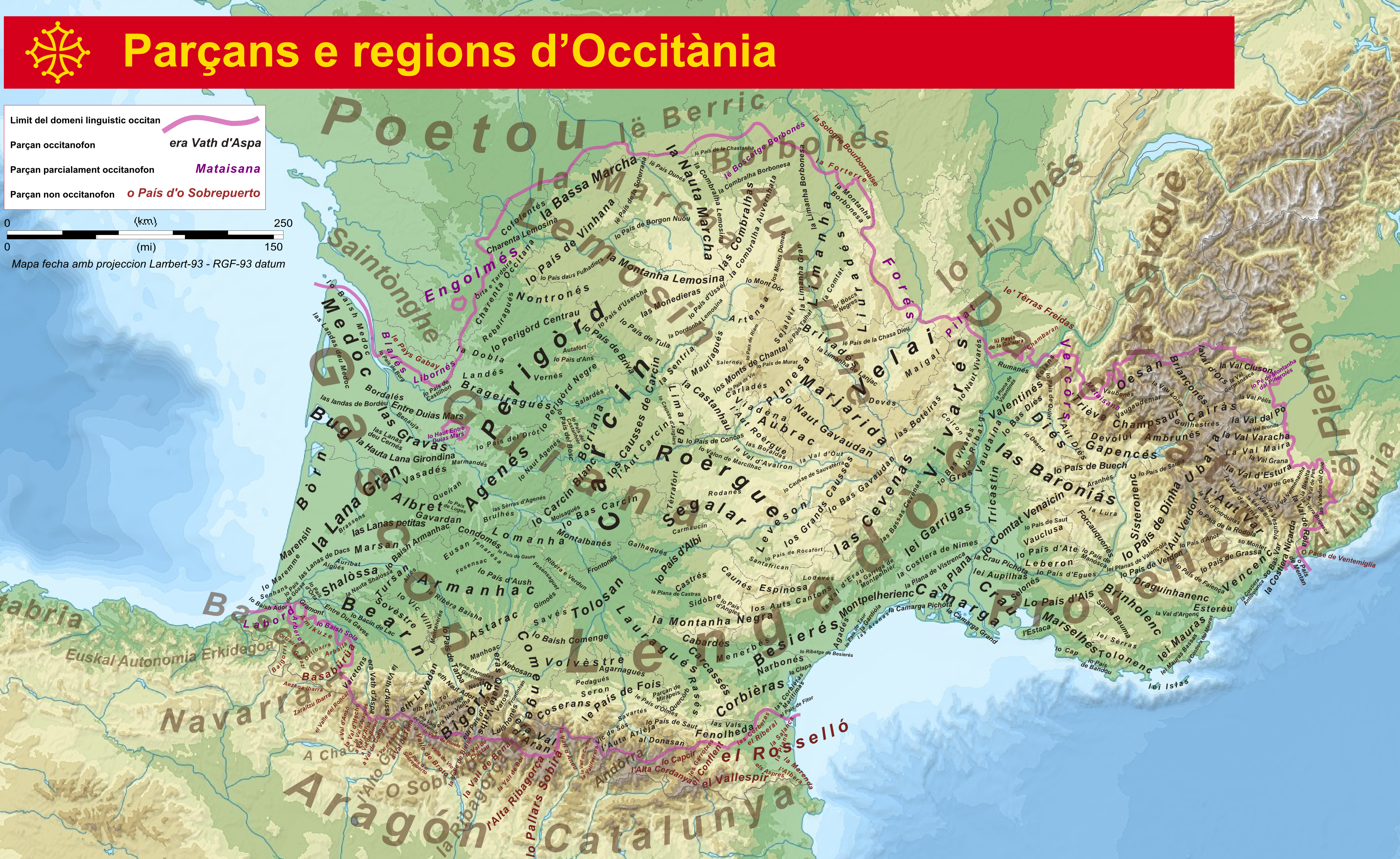
Map of Occitan countries

The Partit de la Nacion Occitana (lit. 'Party of the Occitan Nation') is a political party in Occitania in southern France. It was founded as the Partit Nacionalista Occitan (lit. 'Occitan Nationalist Party') or PNO in 1959 by François Fontan (1929–1979).

== History ==
François Fontan, author of "Ethnism" (French: "Ethnisme"), argued that "language indicates the nation".

Occitan nationalism draws its sources from the Félibrige of Frederic Mistral who, in the second half of the 19th century, worked for recognition of the Occitan language in the southern part of France. Before that, "la langue d'oc" was treated as just a degenerate form of patois, rather than a vernacular language different from the French administrative language.

Fontan tried to proclaim an Occitan republic for the first time in Agen in 1948.

== Flag ==
National flag of Occitania (the cross of Toulouse with the seven-pointed star of the Felibrige)

The Cross of Toulouse, whose design was likely used by the medieval Counts of Toulouse, is used to symbolize the southern French region of Occitania. For the design on an Occitan national flag, Fontan proposed Lo Lugarn, a star with seven points. It was already used by the Félibrige association, referring to the seven Occitan poet founders of the movement, and can be thought to represent Occitania's seven historical counties: Guyenne, Gascony, Provence, Dauphiné, Auvergne, Limousin and Languedoc.

== Elections ==
The PNO regularly presents lists or candidates for elections where Occitan is most spoken, mainly in France. In 1974, the PNO supported the candidacy of the federalist Guy Héraud in the presidential election. Héraud was co-author of "Ethnism". He received less than 0.08% of the vote, the lowest score ever obtained by a candidate in a French presidential election.

In 2004, the regionalist list led by Christian Lacour obtained 1.27% in the Languedoc-Roussillon region. The PNO candidature in the parliamentary elections of 2007 got 0.42% of the votes on the 8th constituency of Haute-Garonne. In 2017, Bastir Occitània received 0.79% in the parliamentary elections.

The PNO obtained its best results at the municipal elections, in 1978 in Fraisse, Italy, and in 2014 in France under the Bastir Occitània designation.

== Support for farmers ==
The PNO systematically supports the militant actions of farmers in Occitania. On 21 January 2024, the PNO published a press release calling for participation at the farmers' demonstration of 22 January in Agen, Lot-et-Garonne.
