= Pic de la Pala Alta de Sarradé =

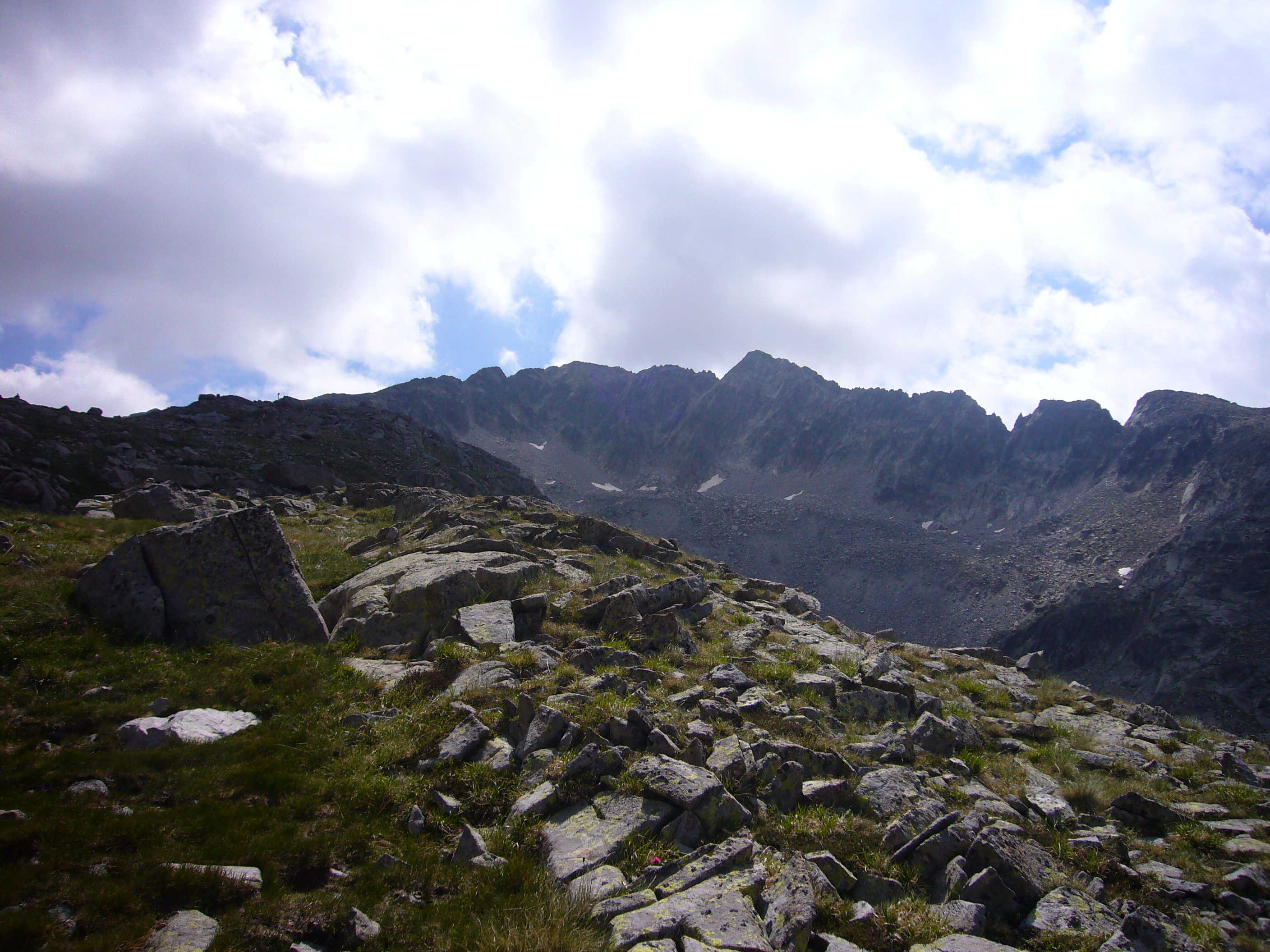
- Pala Alta de Sarradé peak seen from Vall de Comalesbienes

Highest point
- Elevation: 2,893 m (9,491 ft)
- Listing: Mountains in Catalonia
- Coordinates: 42°34′27.1″N 0°53′16.82″E

Geography
- Location within Pyrenees
- Location: Vall de Boí (Alta Ribagorça), Catalonia
- Parent range: Pyrenees

Pic de la Pala Alta de Sarradé is a mountain of the Pyrenees, Catalonia, Spain. Located in the Aigüestortes i Estany de Sant Maurici National Park, it has an elevation of 2,983 metres above sea level).

== See also ==
- Aigüestortes i Estany de Sant Maurici National Park
