= Boí =

- Locality
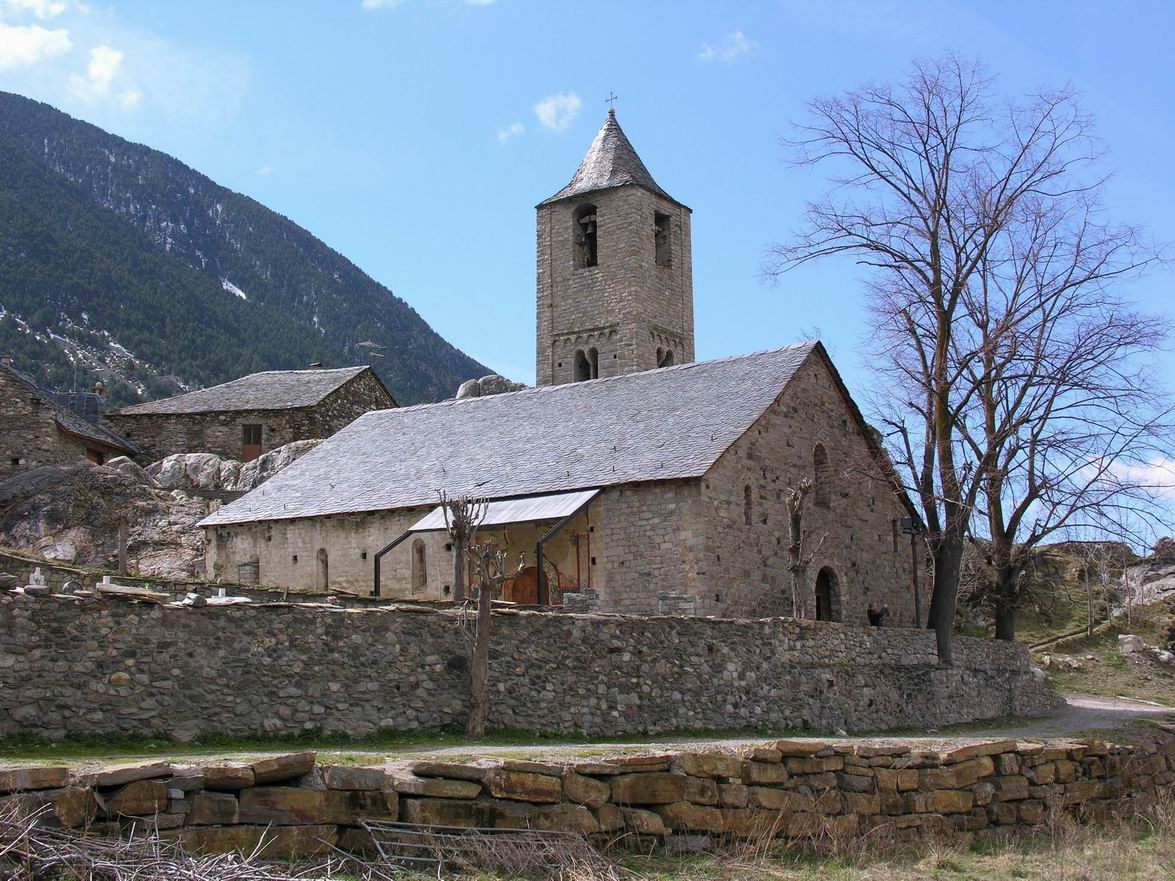

- Location in Catalonia
- Coordinates: 42°31′42″N 0°50′01″E
- Sovereign state: Spain
- Country: Catalonia
- Province: Lleida
- Comarca: Alta Ribagorça
- Municipality: Vall de Boí

Population (2008)
  - Total: 216
- Time zone: UTC+1 (CET)
  - Summer (DST): UTC+2 (CEST)
- Postal code: 25528

Boí is a village in the province of Lleida, in Catalonia. It lies at the centre of the valley and municipality of Vall de Boí in the comarca of Alta Ribagorça.

The village lies just to the south of the Aigüestortes i Estany de Sant Maurici National Park, and there is a park information office in the village.

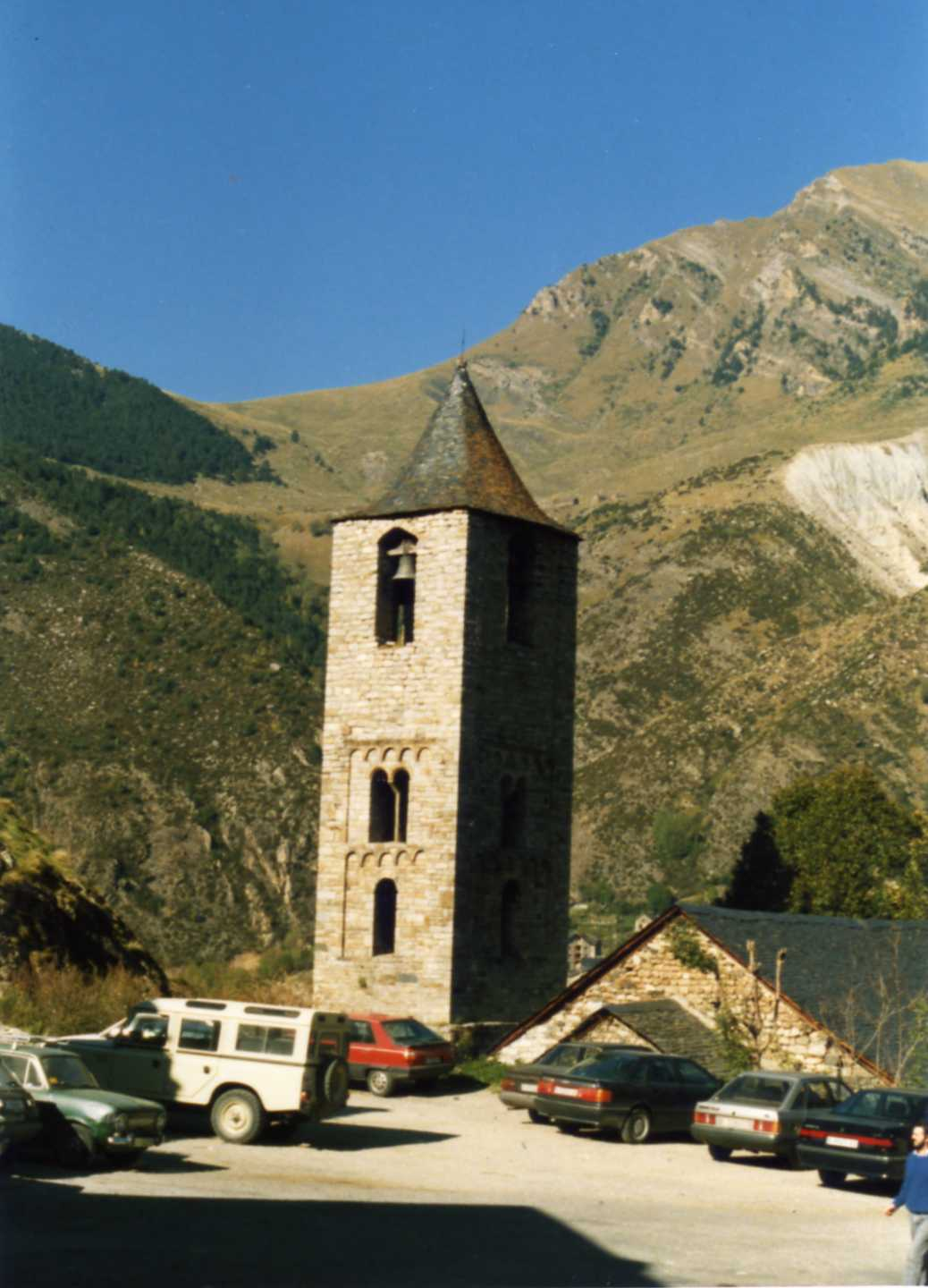
Bell tower of Sant Joan de Boí.

== Sant Joan de Boí ==
The Romanesque church of Sant Joan dates from the 12th century. It has three naves, and a bell tower, in the Lombard style, attached to the nave on the south side. Two of the three storeys are original story. It also has a notable a collection of paintings of the 12th century, depicting various mythical animals. The originals, the Paintings from Sant Joan in Boí, are in the Museu Nacional d'Art de Catalunya in Barcelona, and there are reproductions in the church.
