= Old Bridge of Vilaller =

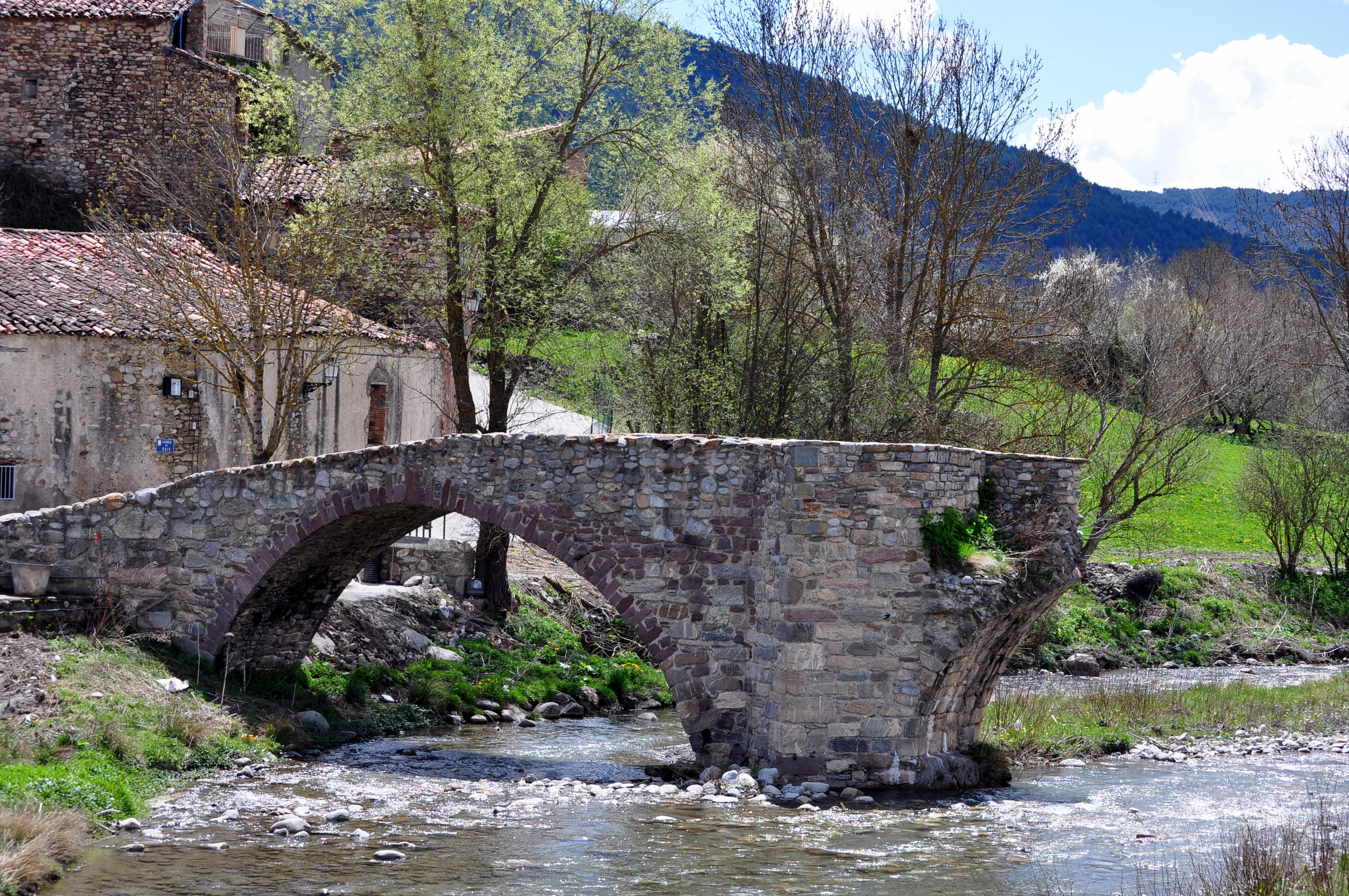
- Coordinates: 42.4772343°N 0.7148718°E
- Crossed: Noguera Ribagorçana
- Locale: Vilaller, Alta Ribagorça, Catalonia

Characteristics
- Design: Arch bridge

History
- Inaugurated: 17th century
- Collapsed: August 2nd 1963

The Old Bridge of Vilaller is an ancient bridge on the river Noguera Ribagorçana, currently in ruins. It is protected as a Bé Cultural d'Interès Local (Local Cultural Heritage site).

== Description ==
The bridge is a 17th-century construction that crosses the river Noguera Ribagorçana, linking the main center of Vilaller with the neighbourhood of Aragon located on the right bank of the river.

The original bridge had three arches, but was damaged during the flood of 1963 and lost two of them.

== History ==
For many years the river was crossed by means of a lever located roughly where the bridge is situated. During the 16th century the village of Vilaller experienced a strong economic growth so that on August 15, 1686, the General Council of Vilaller petitioned to His Majesty Charles II of Spain the permission for building a stone three arched bridge where the lever had been until then. They engaged to build it and keep it.

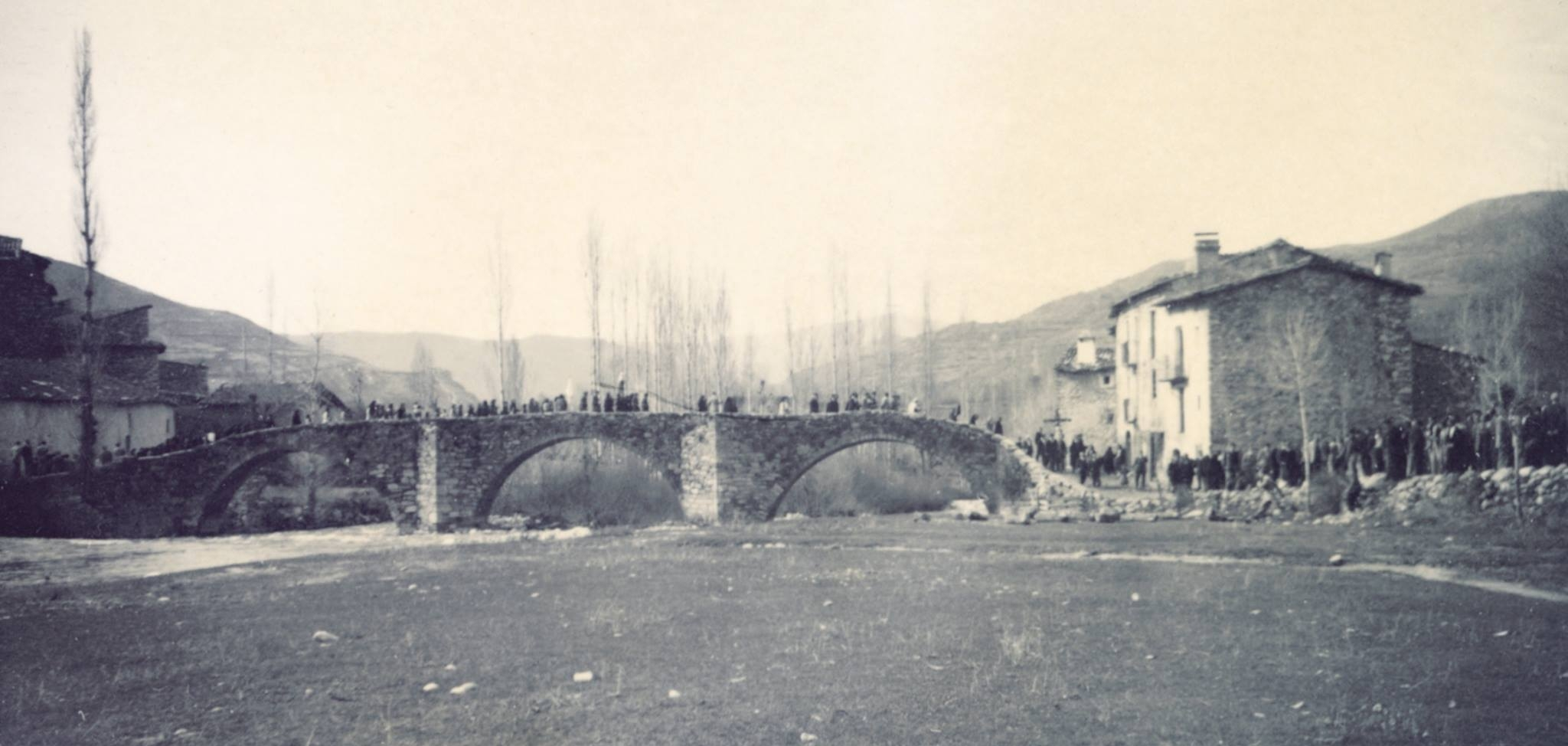
Old bridge Vilaller whole

The bridge endured until the flood of August 2, 1963, when the river destroyed two of the three arches.

For some time, makeshift wooden planks over the ruins of the bridge allowed crossing the river, until June 1964 when a new bridge was built upstream.

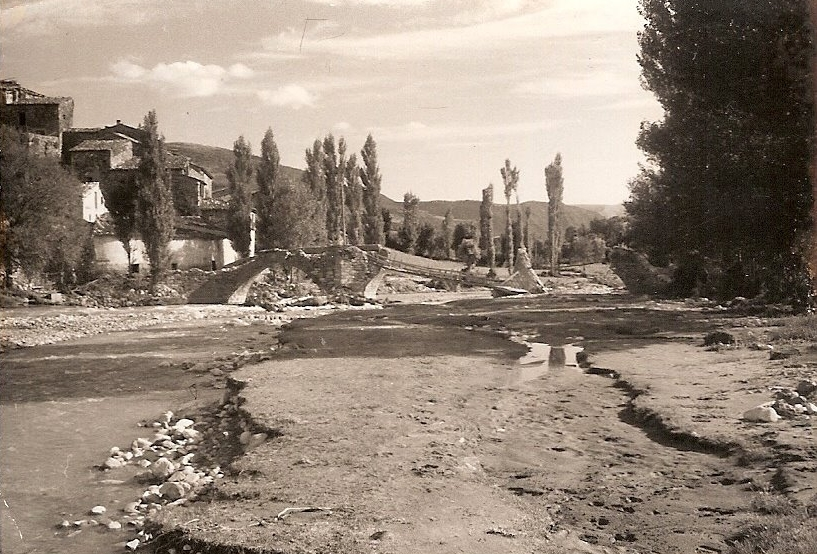
Old bridge derruït and with passeres wooden provisional
