= Noguera Ribagorçana =

River in Spain

Coordinates: 42°37′36″N 0°42′21″E

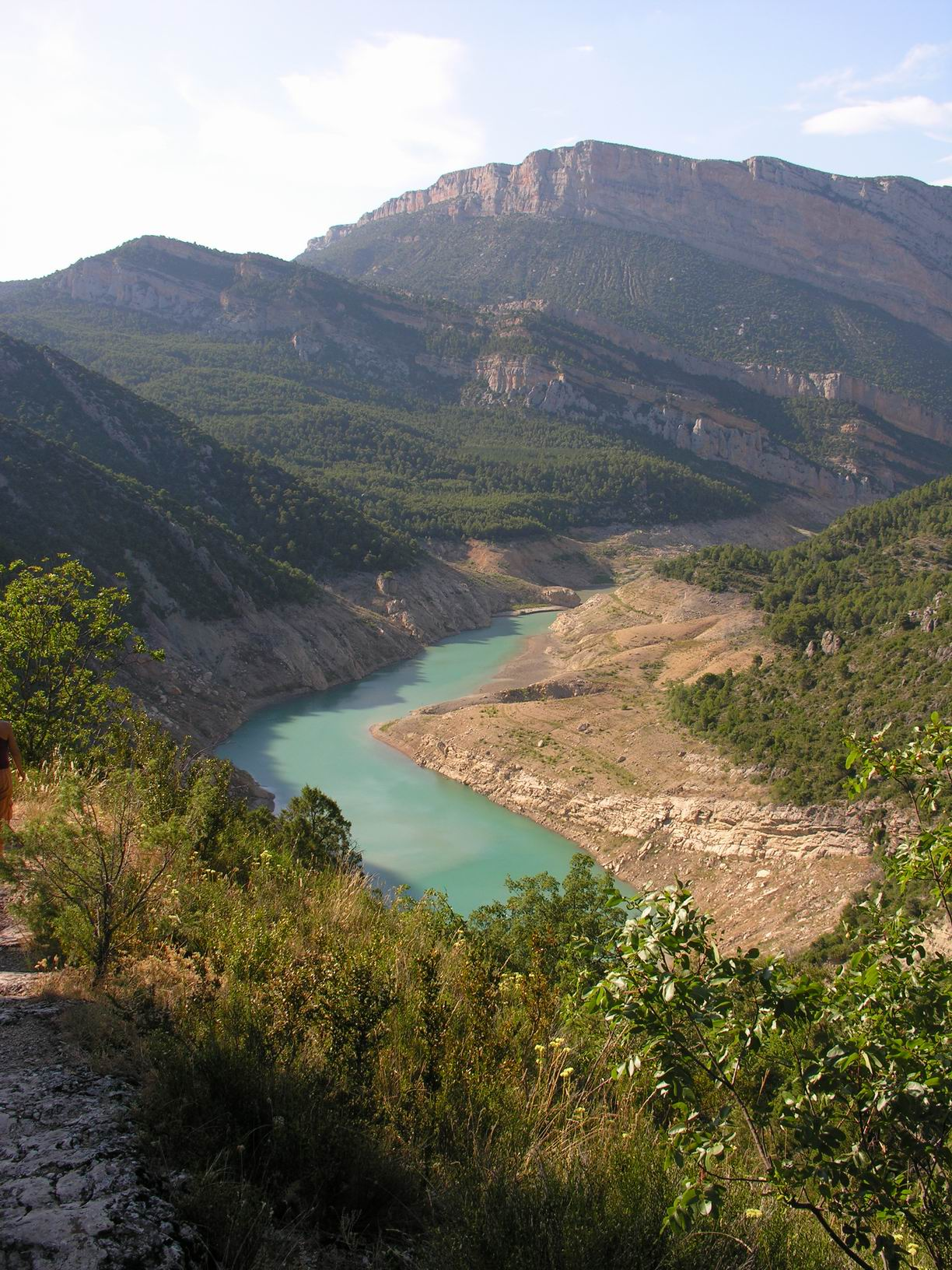
Embassament de Canelles

The Noguera Ribagorzana (Spanish: [noˈɣeɾa riβaɣoɾˈθana]) or Noguera Ribagorçana (Catalan: [nuˈɣeɾə riβəɣuɾˈsanə]) is a river in northern Spain.

For much of its course of 130 km it forms the administrative boundary between Catalonia and Aragon. Its source is in the municipality of Vielha e Mijaran (Aran Valley) at an elevation of about 2400 m, and its upper valley forms the main access route to the Aran Valley (N-230 road and the Vielha tunnel (5230 m long) under the watershed). It passes through the traditional county of Ribagorza and the town of Pont de Suert (Alta Ribagorça). Dams form two large reservoirs, the Escales below Pont de Suert and the Canelles above Ivars de Noguera (Noguera). The Noguera Ribagorzana joins the Segre from the right at Vilanova de la Barca (Segrià). It drains a basin of 2036 km^{2}.

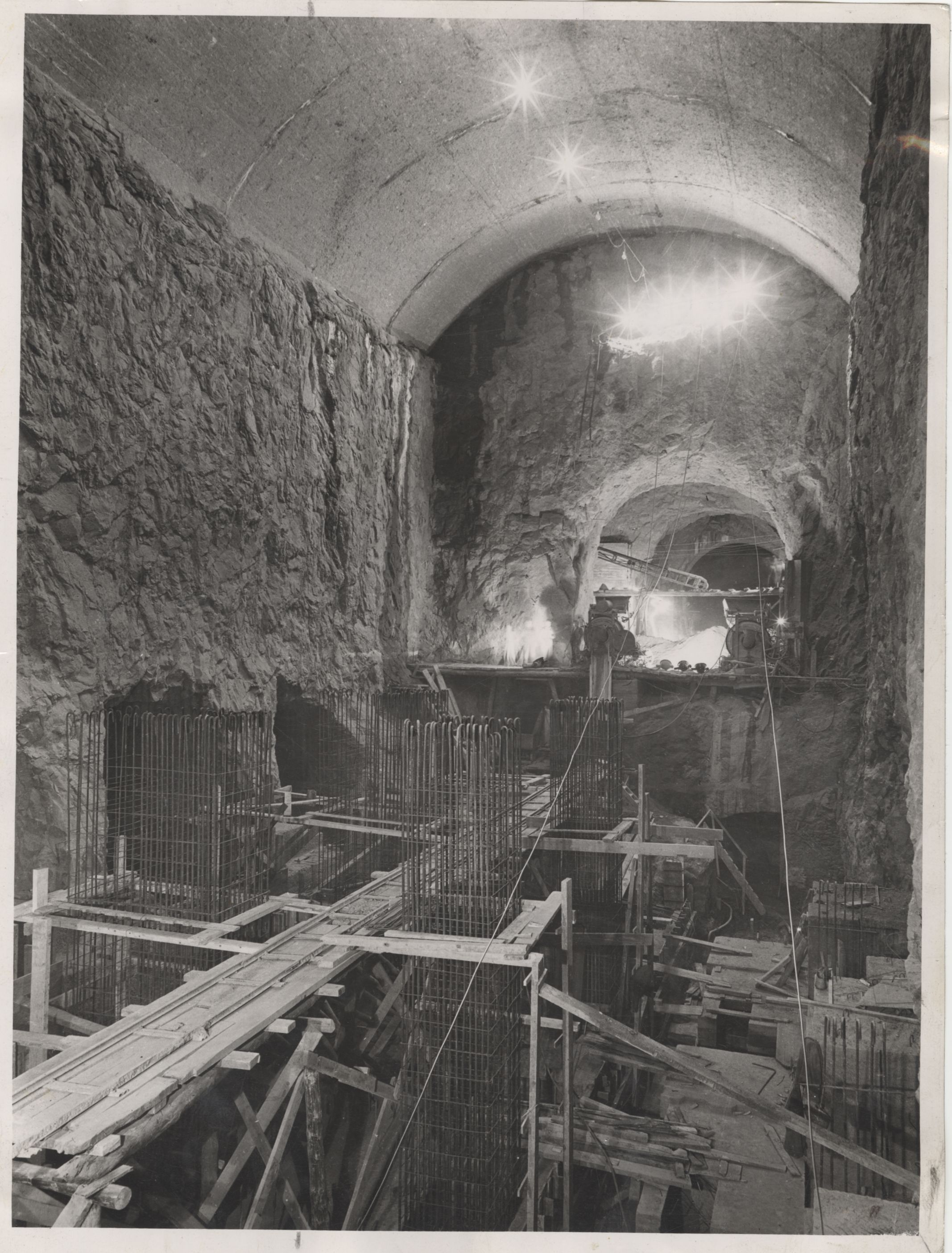
Construction of the hydroelectric power plant of Ribagorzana, 1955 (Archivio storico Touring Club Italiano)

== See also ==
- List of rivers of Spain
- Old Bridge of Vilaller
