= Vilaller =

- Municipality
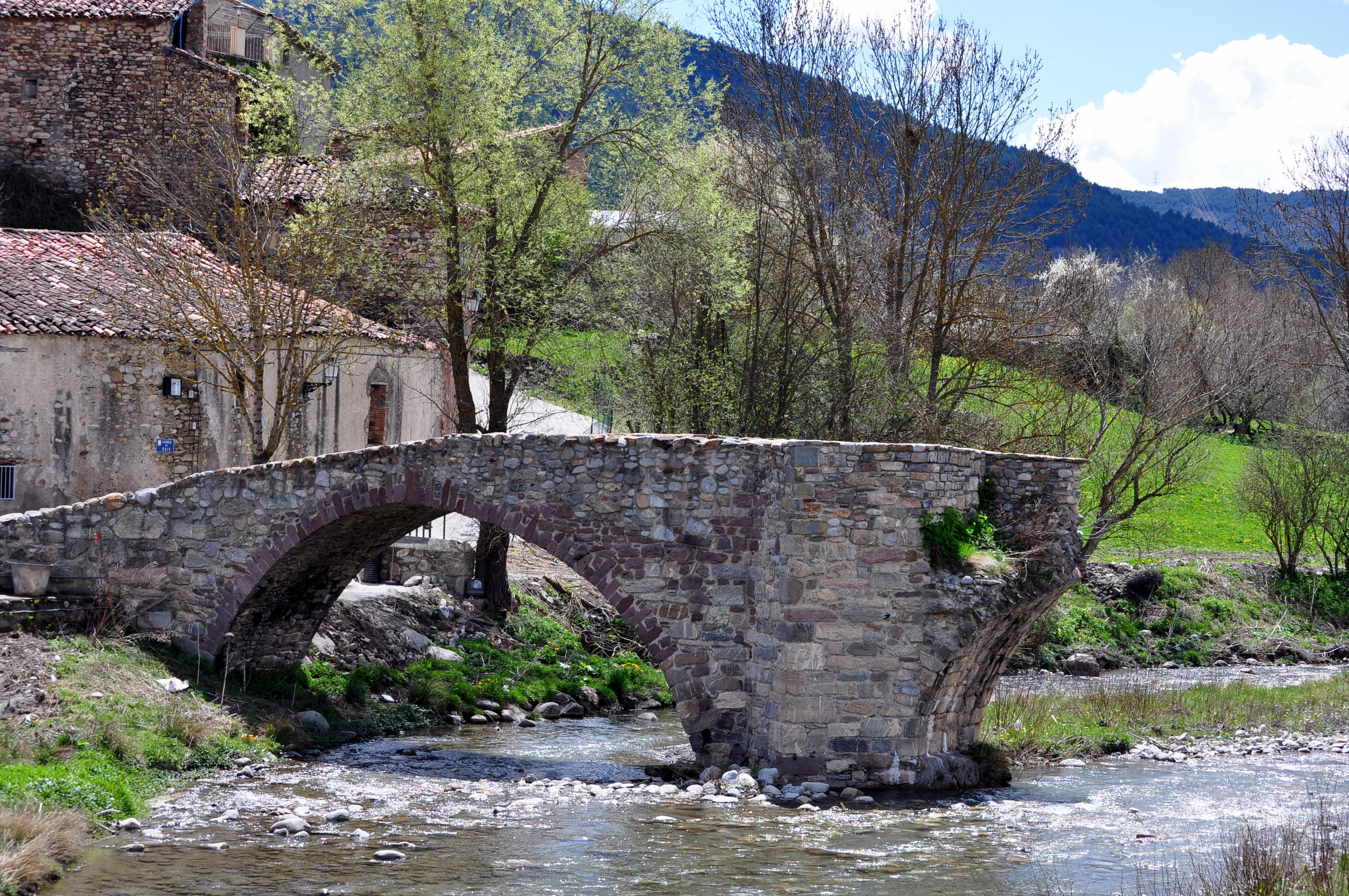
- Old bridge of Vilaller

- Coat of arms

- Location in Alta Ribagorça county

- Location within Catalonia Location within Spain
- Coordinates: 42°29′N 0°43′E
- Sovereign state: Spain
- Community: Catalonia
- Region: Alt Pirineu
- County: Alta Ribagorça
- Province: Lleida

Government
  - Mayor: Maria José Erta Ruíz (2015) (PSC)

Area
  - Total: 59.2 km^{2} (22.9 sq mi)
- Elevation: 981 m (3,219 ft)

Population (2025-01-01)
  - Total: 496
  - Density: 8.38/km^{2} (21.7/sq mi)
- Demonym(s): vilallerenc, vilallerenca
- Postal code: 25552
- Website: www.ajuntamentdevilaller.cat

Vilaller (Western Catalan: [bi.laˈʎe], locally (Ribagorçan) [bi.ɾaˈʎe]) is a town and municipality in Alta Ribagorça county in the Province of Lleida, Catalonia, Spain.

Besides from the town of Vilaller, the municipality comprises the hamlet of Senet de Barravés and the old stable of Cierco, the latter is abandoned: only Senet and Vilaller have permanent population. In the past Casós, Sarroqueta de Barravés and Viuet belonged to Vilaller.

The parish church of Vilaller is dedicated to Saint Clement. Nearby the town there is also the sanctuary of the Mother of God of Riupedrós or Reperós, the hermitages of Saint Mammes, Saint Anthony and Saint Peter (of which just few rests remain), the first chapel of the Seminar, dedicated to the Immaculate Conception, and the second chapel of the Seminar dedicated to Saint Joseph. The parish of Vilaller belongs to the diocese of Lleida, because it belonged to the diocese of Roda during the Middle Ages. It is part of the 26th pastoral unit of the archpriest of Ribagorça and is managed by the rector of El Pont de Suert.

The exact location of the benedictine monastery of Sant Andreu de Barravés, of great importance in the history of the valley, remains unknown.

It has a population of 496 (register office, 2025), and it has an area of 59.23 km^{2}. The postcode is 25552.

== Etymology ==
According to Joan Coromines, Vilaller comes from villa Alihari, a hybrid form with first a romance component (town) and second a German one (a proper name).

== Geography ==
The municipality limits with Vielha e Mijaran to the north, Naut Aran to the north-east, Vall de Boí to the east, El Pont de Suert to the south and Montanuy to the west.

== Sights ==
- Old Bridge of Vilaller
