= Espot Esquí =

Ski resort in Espot, Catalan Pyrenees

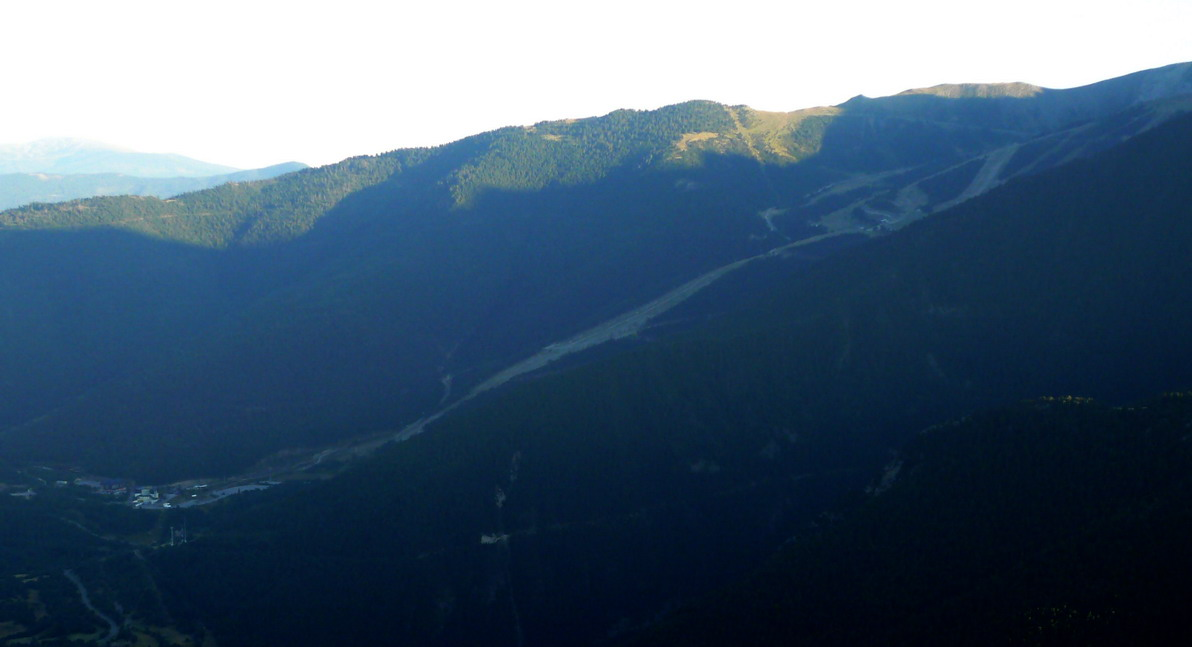

- Location within Spain Location within Catalonia Location within Pyrenees
- Location: Espot
- Nearest city: Espot, Catalonia
- Coordinates: 42°33′02″N 1°4′51″E
- Top elevation: 2,500 m (8,200 ft)
- Base elevation: 1,500 m (4,900 ft)
- Skiable area: 23.5
- Trails: Black: 4 Red: 7 Blue: 9 Green: 2; 22 Total
- Lift system: 7 Total (2 Chairlifts, 3 Platter lifts, Carpets)
- Lift capacity: 9,140 skiers an hour
- Website: website

Espot Esquí is a ski resort located in Espot, in the Catalan Pyrenees, opened in 1967. The ski area extends from 1,500 to 2,500 metres.

It's one of the ways of entry in the Aigüestortes i Estany de Sant Maurici National Park, and is near an area with many lakes of glacial origin, the trails facing the northeast are surrounded by a forest.

Espot Esquí has an extensive length of tracks with a very careful design, a new stage areas were created for each skier could find a practice space for many activities: Alpine skiing, Nordic skiing, snowboarding, Cross-country skiing, Ski mountaineering, freeriding, snowshoeing, hiking on snowmobiles, circuits with dog sleds, etc.. This expansion was not without some controversy because the environment is near an area listed in the Natura network.
