= Paintings from Sant Joan in Boí =

Group of Catalan Romanesque paintings

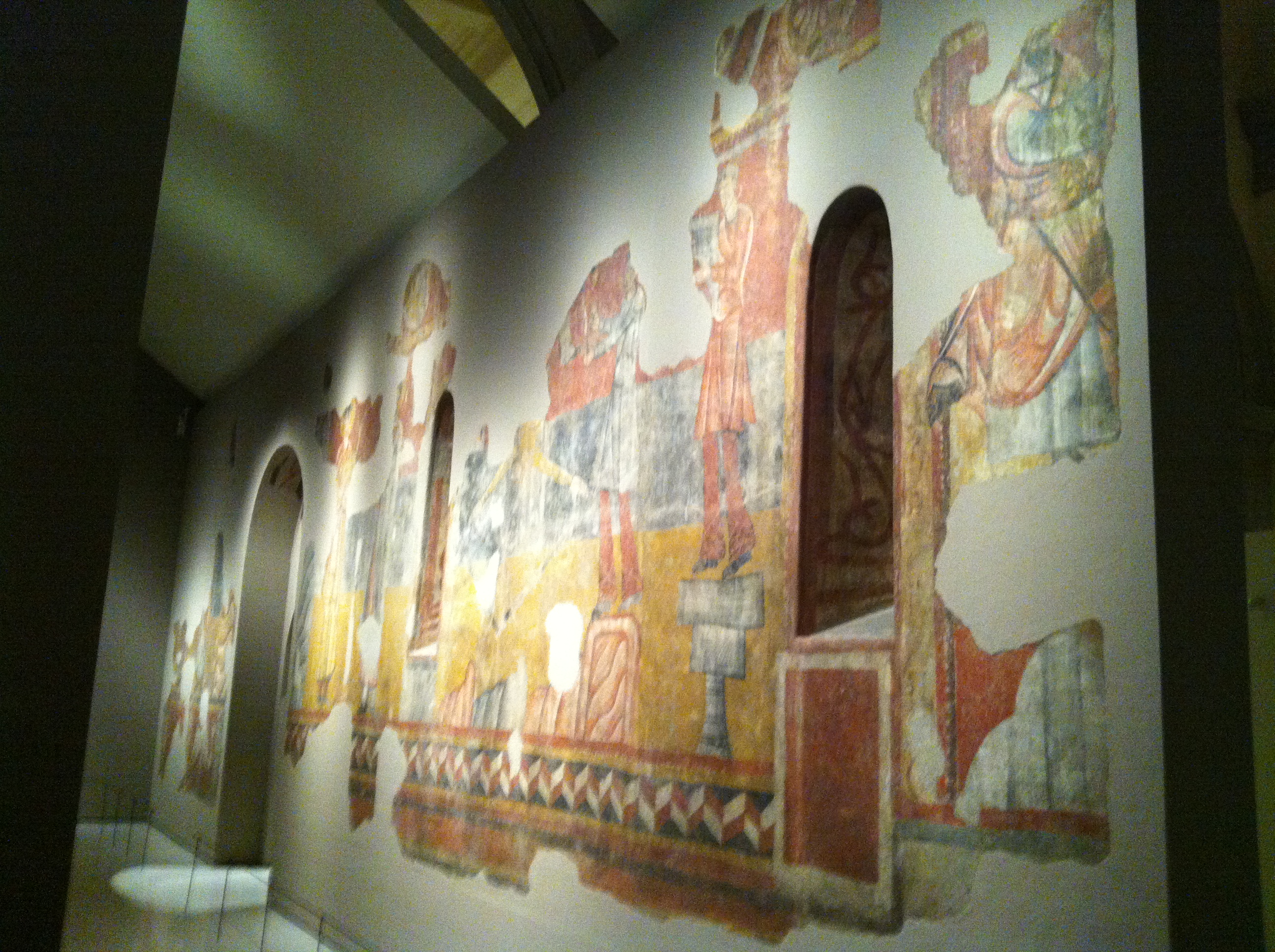
- Artist: Master of Boí
- Year: c. 1100 the interior and twelfth century the façade
- Location: Museu Nacional d'Art de Catalunya; Barcelona

The Paintings from Sant Joan in Boí is a group of Catalan Romanesque paintings exhibited at the National Art Museum of Catalonia in Barcelona.

== Description ==
The paintings from Sant Joan in Boí make up what is considered one of the finest groups in Catalan Romanesque painting. The paintings have been dated to around 1100, established indirectly on the basis of the architecture of the building and from comparison with the paintings in other churches in the valley of Boí: Sant Climent and Santa Maria in Taüll. Their study has led to comparison with those of Saint Martin de Vicq (Nohant-Vicq, Indre, central France) from the second half of the twelfth century, in which has been found not so much a certain interdependence but the use of common, possibly Carolingian European models.

Of the whole, what remains is basically the painting from the aisles and the arches separating the nave and the aisles, enough to reveal a rich iconographic programme with ample references to the story of the Redemption.

Exemplary scenes are depicted from the lives of saints, of which the most important fragment is the Lapidation of Saint Stephen, a vast repertory of animals of a moralistic nature (mainly on the intradoses of the arches) and a scene with minstrels, something very unusual, which in this case must be taken as being in praise of the Lord. There was also a representation of the Day of Judgement from which the surviving fragments of Paradise, Hell and the apocalyptic dragon came. The paintings from Boí must be considered an example of an underlying French influence in Catalonia which was different from the Italian influence that was to dominate the Romanesque pictorial scenario in Catalonia after the paintings of the Pedret Circle.
