= Lo Corrunco =

Mountain in Catalonia, Spain

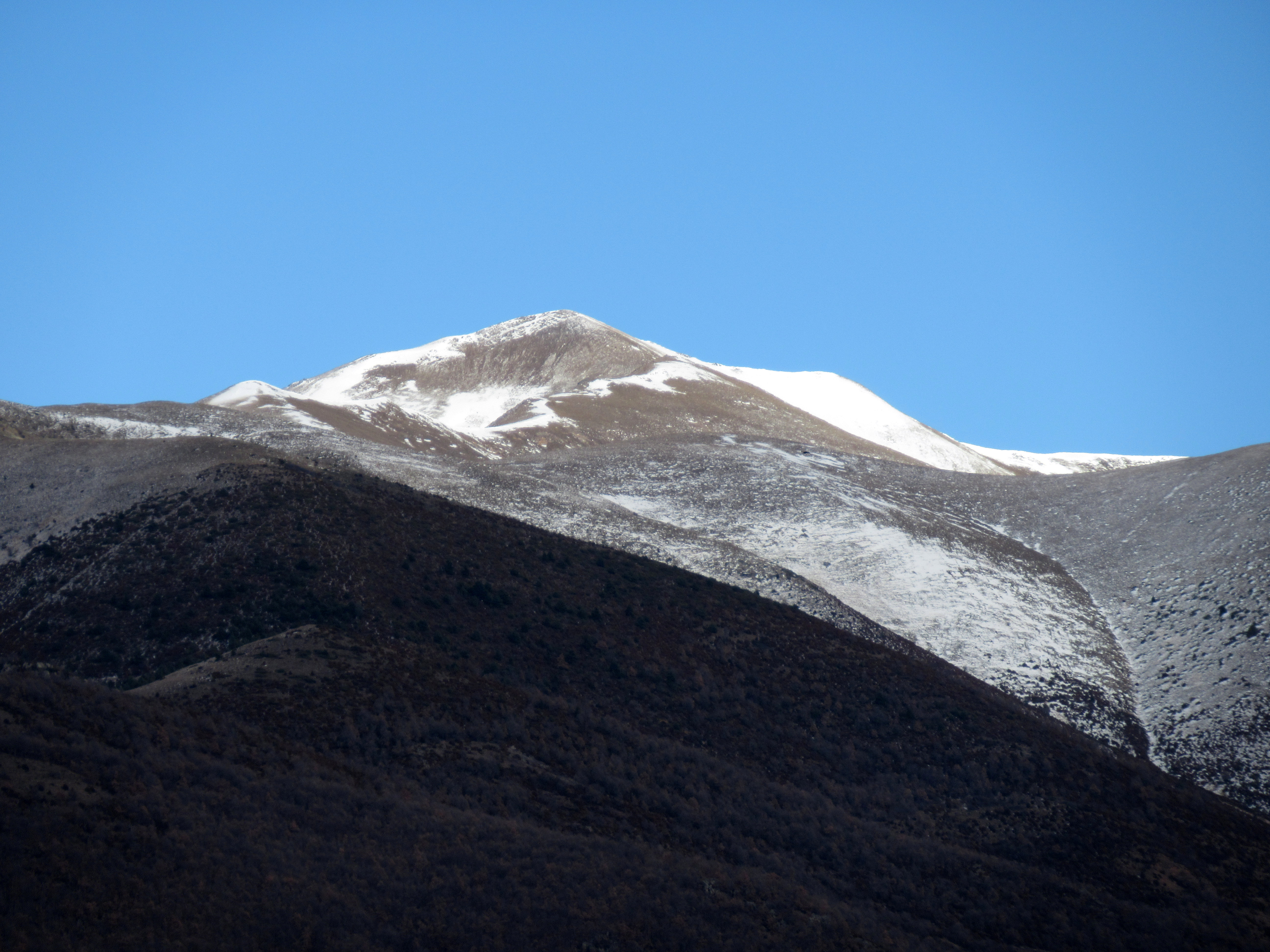

Highest point
- Elevation: 2,543 m (8,343 ft)
- Coordinates: 42°27′43.57″N 0°49′42.70″E

Geography
- Location within Pyrenees
- Location: Alta Ribagorça, Catalonia, Spain
- Parent range: Pyrenees

Lo Corrunco or El Corronco is a mountain of Catalonia, Spain. Located in the Pyrenees, it has an altitude of 2,543.3 metres above sea level.

== See also ==
- Mountains of Catalonia
