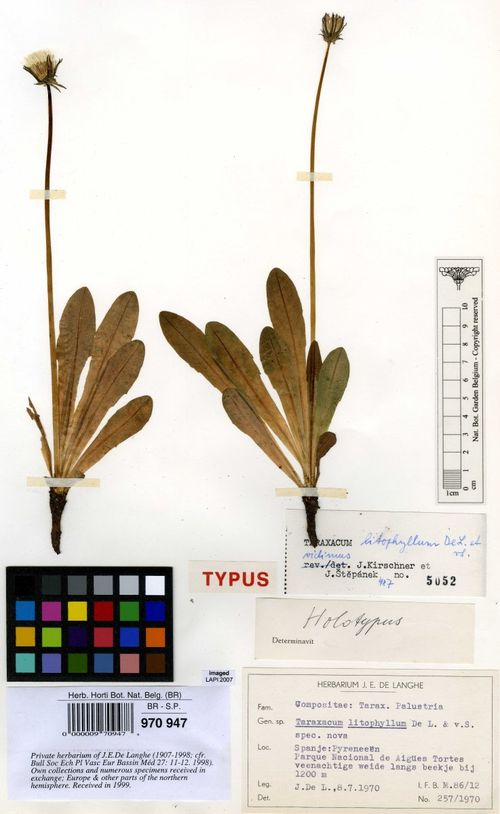

Conservation status
- Data Deficient (IUCN 3.1)

Scientific classification
- Kingdom: Plantae
- Clade: Tracheophytes
- Clade: Angiosperms
- Clade: Eudicots
- Clade: Asterids
- Order: Asterales
- Family: Asteraceae
- Genus: Taraxacum
- Species: T. litophyllum

Binomial name
- Taraxacum litophyllum De Langhe & Soest

Synonyms
- Taraxacum palustr subsp. litophyllum (De Langhe & Soest) O.Bolòs, Vigo, Masalles & Ninot

= Taraxacum litophyllum =

Species of dandelion

Taraxacum litophyllum is a species of dandelion in the family Asteraceae. The species is a perennial, and is native to Spain.

The only known specimen of the species was collected in Northern Spain in 1970, at an elevation of 1,200 metres. It was collected in a marshy grassland beside a stream, in the Aigüestortes i Estany de Sant Maurici National Park. The precise location from which the specimen was collected is unknown. The holotype is owned by the Meise Botanic Garden.
