= Espot =

- Municipality
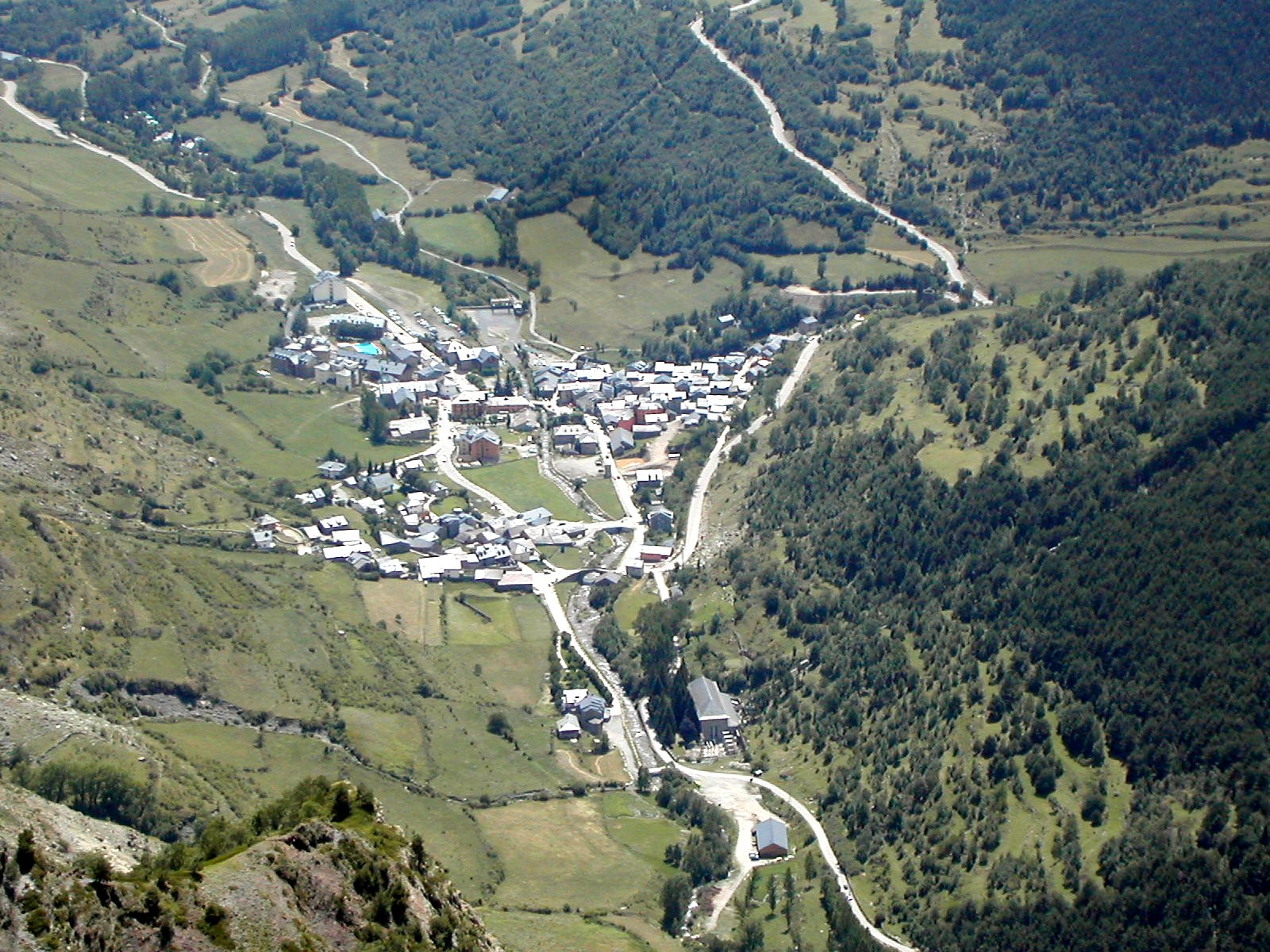
- Aerial view of Espot

- Location in Pallars Sobirà county

- Location within Catalonia Location within Spain
- Coordinates: 42°34′43″N 1°5′17″E
- Country: Spain
- Community: Catalonia
- Province: Lleida
- Comarca: Pallars Sobirà

Government
  - Mayor: Josep Maria Sebastià Canal (Viu Espot) (2015)

Area
  - Total: 97.3 km^{2} (37.6 sq mi)
- Elevation: 1,318 m (4,324 ft)

Population (2025-01-01)
  - Total: 377
  - Density: 3.87/km^{2} (10.0/sq mi)
- Website: espot.cat

Espot (Catalan pronunciation: [asˈpɔt]) is a town and municipality in Pallars Sobirà county, Province of Lleida, Catalonia, Spain. It has a population of 377 (register office, 2025).

It is located in the Espot Valley, west of the river Noguera Pallaresa. The municipality is one of the entrances to the Aigüestortes i Estany de Sant Maurici National Park. Espot has been mentioned in documents dating back to the year 839.

== Economy ==
The economy of the municipality is largely based on tourism, thanks to the ski resort Espot Esquí and an increase in rural tourism. The area also depends on the milk industry and cattle ranching, specifically bovines. There are various hydroelectric power stations in the area including Sant Maurici, Lladres and Espot.

== Population history ==
1900	1930	1950	1970	1981	1986	2008
310	313	607	269	227	224	360
