= Alt Pirineu =

Vegueria (region) of Catalonia

Coordinates: 42°23′50″N 1°19′26″E

- Vegueria
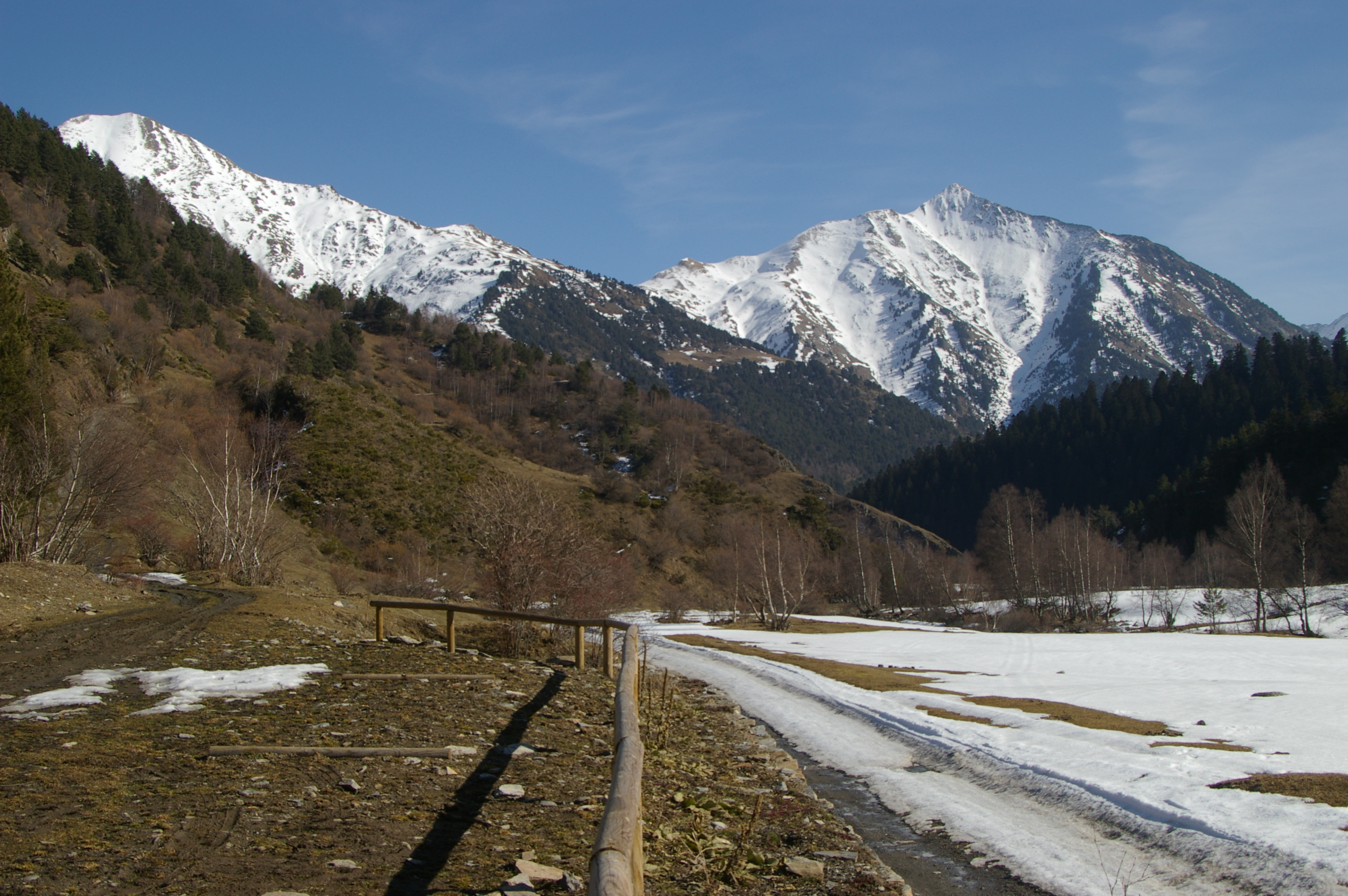
- The Alt Pirineu Natural Park

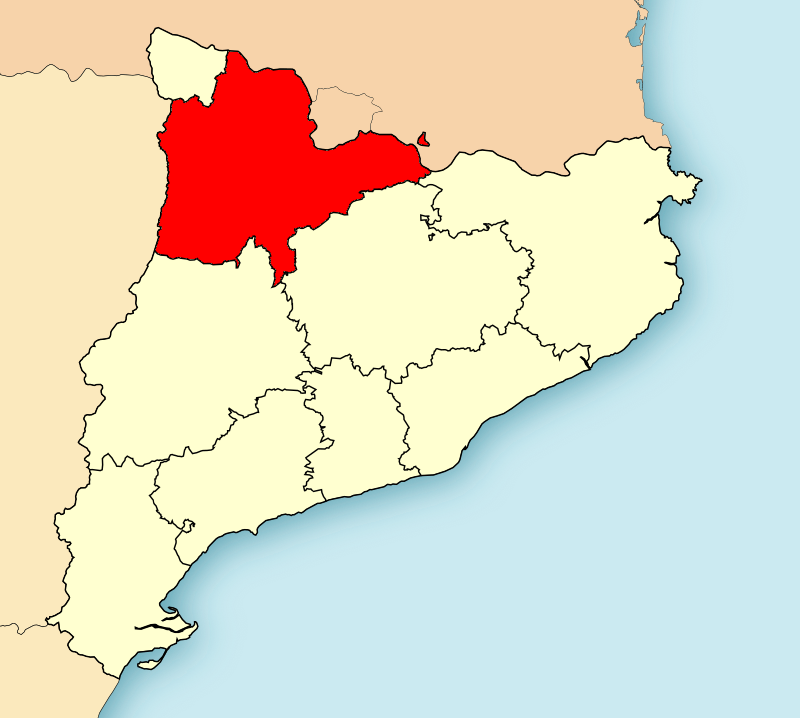
- Sovereign state: Spain
- Community: Catalonia
- Capital: La Seu d'Urgell (de facto)
- Counties: Alta Ribagorça; Alt Urgell; Baixa Cerdanya; Pallars Jussà; Pallars Sobirà

Government
  - Type: Vegueria Council (TBD)
  - President: N/A (since 2010)
  - Delegate of the Catalan Government: Sílvia Romero Galera (2024–)

Area
  - Total: 5,142 km^{2} (1,985 sq mi)

Population (2025)
  - Total: 66,564
  - Density: 12.95/km^{2} (33.53/sq mi)

Alt Pirineu (Catalan pronunciation: [ˈaɫ pi.ɾiˈnɛw]; Spanish: Alto Pirineo; English: Upper Pyrenee) is one of the nine regions (vegueries) of Catalonia.

Located in the north-west of Catalonia, specifically by the Pyrenees, it covers the higher mountain regions from the Aragon border to the Cerdanya. It is the second least populated region, with 66,564 inhabitants as of 2025.

It consists of the counties of Alta Ribagorça, Alt Urgell, Cerdanya, Pallars Jussà and Pallars Sobirà. Although the Aran Valley is officially not part of the region, as it has its own autonomous governing body, it is sometimes included under the name of Alt Pirineu i Aran (English: Upper Pyrenees and Aran; Aranese: Naut Pirenèu e Aran; Spanish: Alto Pirineo y Arán) for statistical purposes. Within Catalonia, it borders to the south with Ponent and Central Catalonia, and to the east with the Girona region.

Its de facto capital is La Seu d'Urgell, the most populous settlement, as a law has not set one yet.

== Comarques ==
Alt Pirineu is composed of five different comarques.

Comarca	Capital	Population (2025)	Area (km^{2})
Alta Ribagorça	El Pont de Suert	4,051	427
Alt Urgell	La Seu d'Urgell	21,477	1,447
Cerdanya	Puigcerdà	20,111	547
Pallars Jussà	Tremp	13,593	1,343
Pallars Sobirà	Sort	7,332	1,378

== Geography ==
Natural spaces in Alt Pirineu and the Aran Valley: Aigüestortes i Estany de Sant Maurici; Alt Pirineu (to the north); Cadí-Moixeró (to the east)

=== Location ===
The location of the Upper Pyrenees is essentially strategic. It is bordered to the west by Aragon and to the north by Andorra and France's Occitania. Andorra has a significant importance in the region as, with a surface area of 8% compared to that of the region, Andorra has a population similar to the whole region. Besides, the small country has twice as many work places as the whole region, and its economy is closely tied to Andorra's. Taking advantage of this situation, the Catalan government aims to create joint Pyrenean strategies, particularly in terms of infrastructure and facilities, so that they are more favourable and can achieve sufficient critical mass to make them possible and viable. Besides, the biggest city, La Seu d'Urgell, is the seat of the Bishop of Urgell, one of the co-princes of Andorra, and the region holds the Andorra–La Seu d'Urgell Airport.

=== Climate ===
The climate is predominantly mountainous. Four zones can be distinguished: one with an alpine and subalpine climate, another with an Atlantic climate (mainly the Aran Valley), and two other ones with high-mountain and medium/low-mountain Mediterranean climates.

=== Protected natural spaces ===
The Upper Pyrenees holds a third of the protected natural areas of Catalonia. It includes a national park and two natural parks.

- Aigüestortes i Estany de Sant Maurici National Park
- Alt Pirineu Natural Park
- Cadí-Moixeró Natural Park

== Local media ==
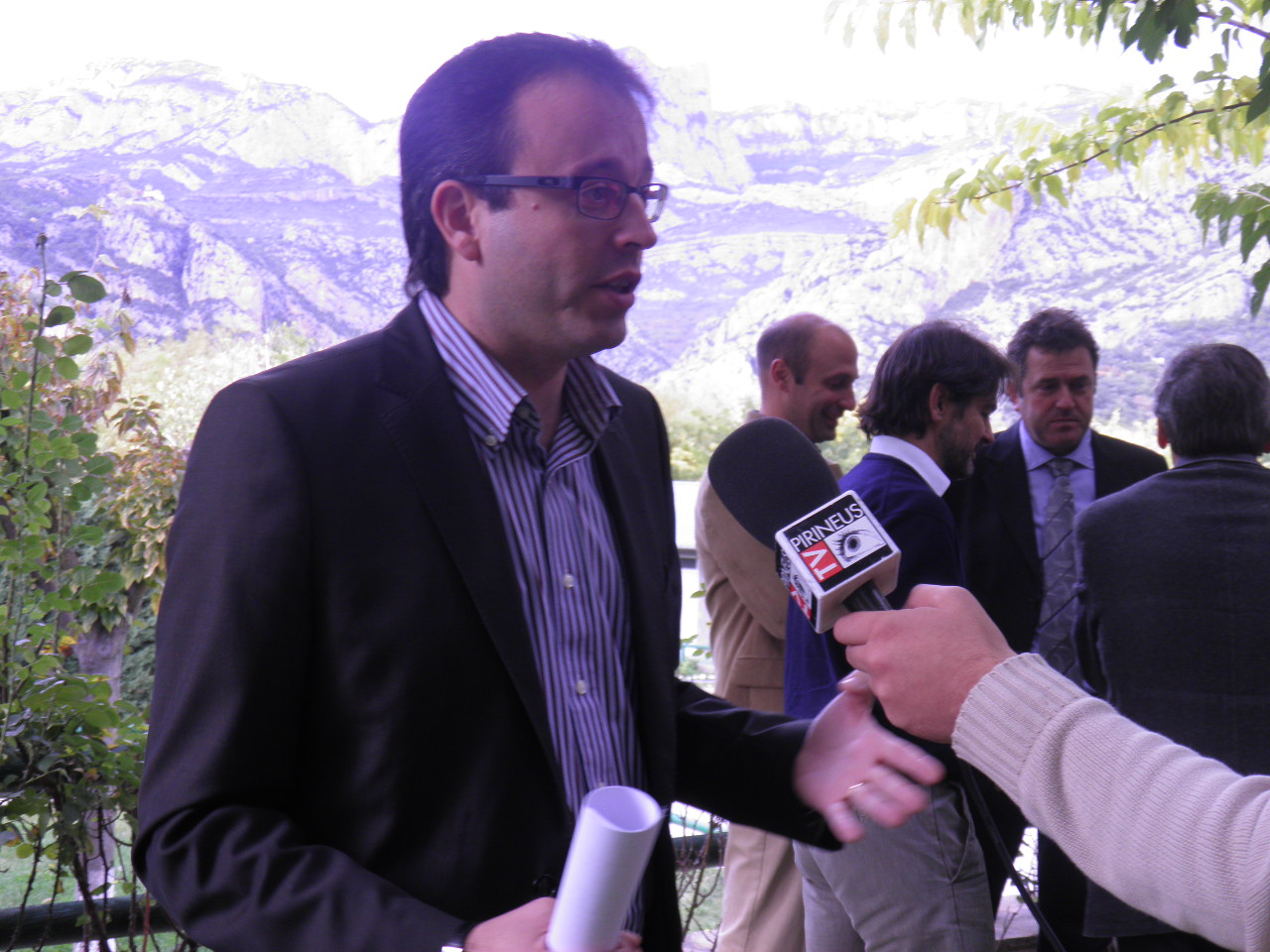
Marc Solsona, mayor of Mollerussa, is interviewed by the regional television station Pirineus TV.

=== Television ===
In addition to channels broadcasting for the whole of Catalonia, such as those of Televisió de Catalunya or the regional broadcasts of RTVE Catalunya, as well as channels broadcasting for all of Spain, the Alt Pirineu region has its own multiplex (TL03L), holding two local commercial channels: Pirineus TV (also watchable in Andorra) and Lleida Televisió (also watchable in Ponent).

In addition, TV3's Telenotícies comarques programme used to offer a brief regional news segment via disconnections from the main feed for the regions of Alt Pirineu and Ponent until its discontinuation in June 2017.

=== News ===
Some local news outlets in Alt Pirineu are Viure als Pirineus, RàdioSeu and Pallars Digital (the latter two aimed at Alt Urgell or Pallars Jussà and Pallars Sobirà, respectively, but servicing the whole region). 3/24, Ara, Nació, Diari Segre and Les Vegueries also include regional news sections for Alt Pirineu.
