= Sant Joan de Boí =

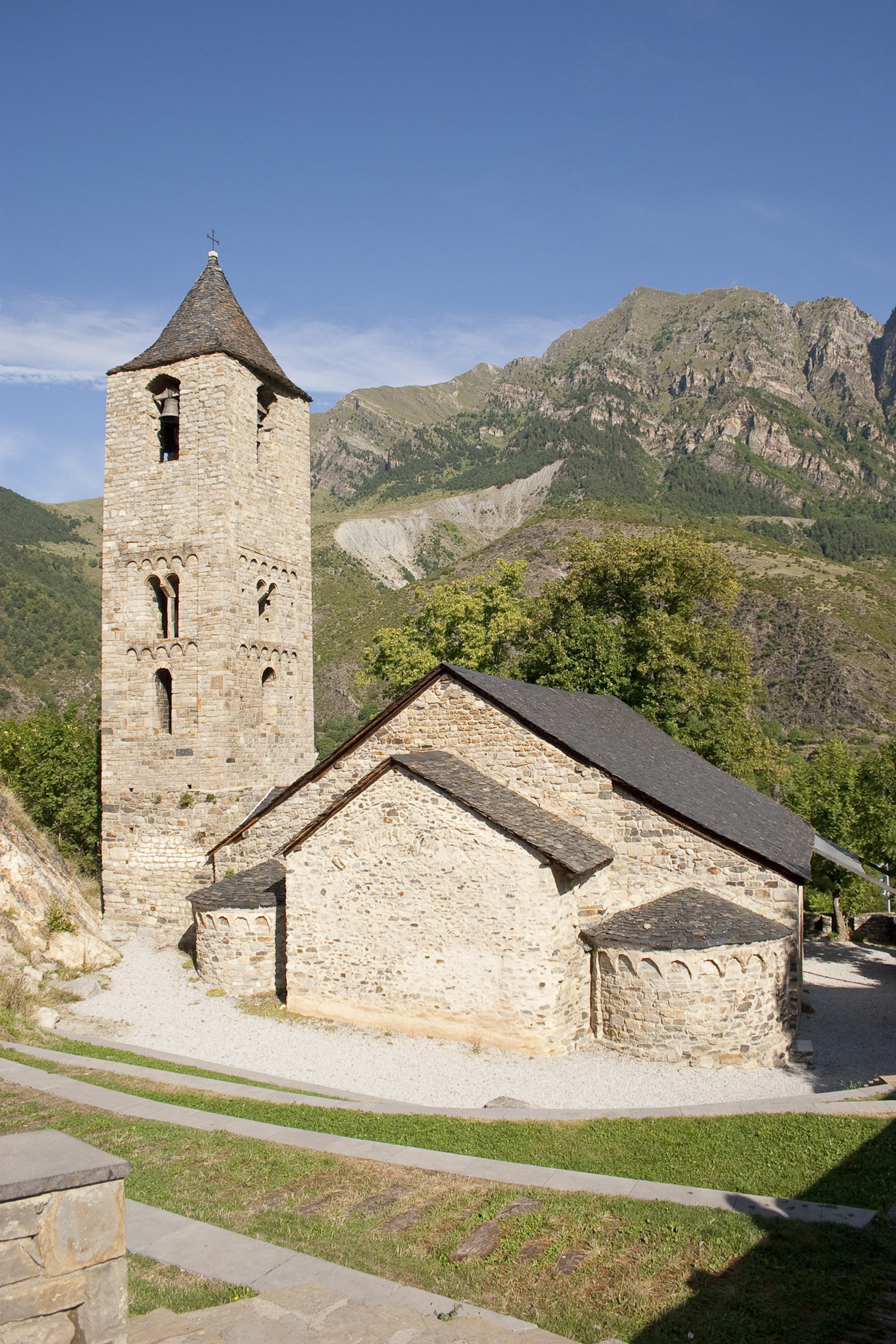

- Location within Spain

Religion
- Affiliation: Roman Catholic

Location
- Location: Boí, Catalonia, Spain
- Interactive map of Sant Joan de Boí
- Coordinates: 42.522415°N 0.833571°E

Architecture
- Type: Church
- Style: Romanesque
- UNESCO World Heritage Site
- Official name: Catalan Romanesque Churches of the Vall de Boí
- Type: Cultural
- Criteria: ii, iv
- Designated: 2000 (24th session)
- Reference no.: 988
- Region: Europe and North America

Sant Joan de Boí is a Romanesque church situated in the territory of Vall de Boí, a commune in the valley of the same name, in the Province of Lleida in the autonomous community of Catalonia in Spain.

== History ==
Like Sant Climent, Taüll, Sant Feliu de Barruera, Santa Eulàlia d'Erill la Vall or Santa Maria de Taüll, the date of construction of Sant Joan de Boí is believed to be in the 11th century.

In November 2000, it was declared to be a UNESCO World Heritage Site with eight other Catalan Romanesque Churches of the Vall de Boí.

== Architecture ==
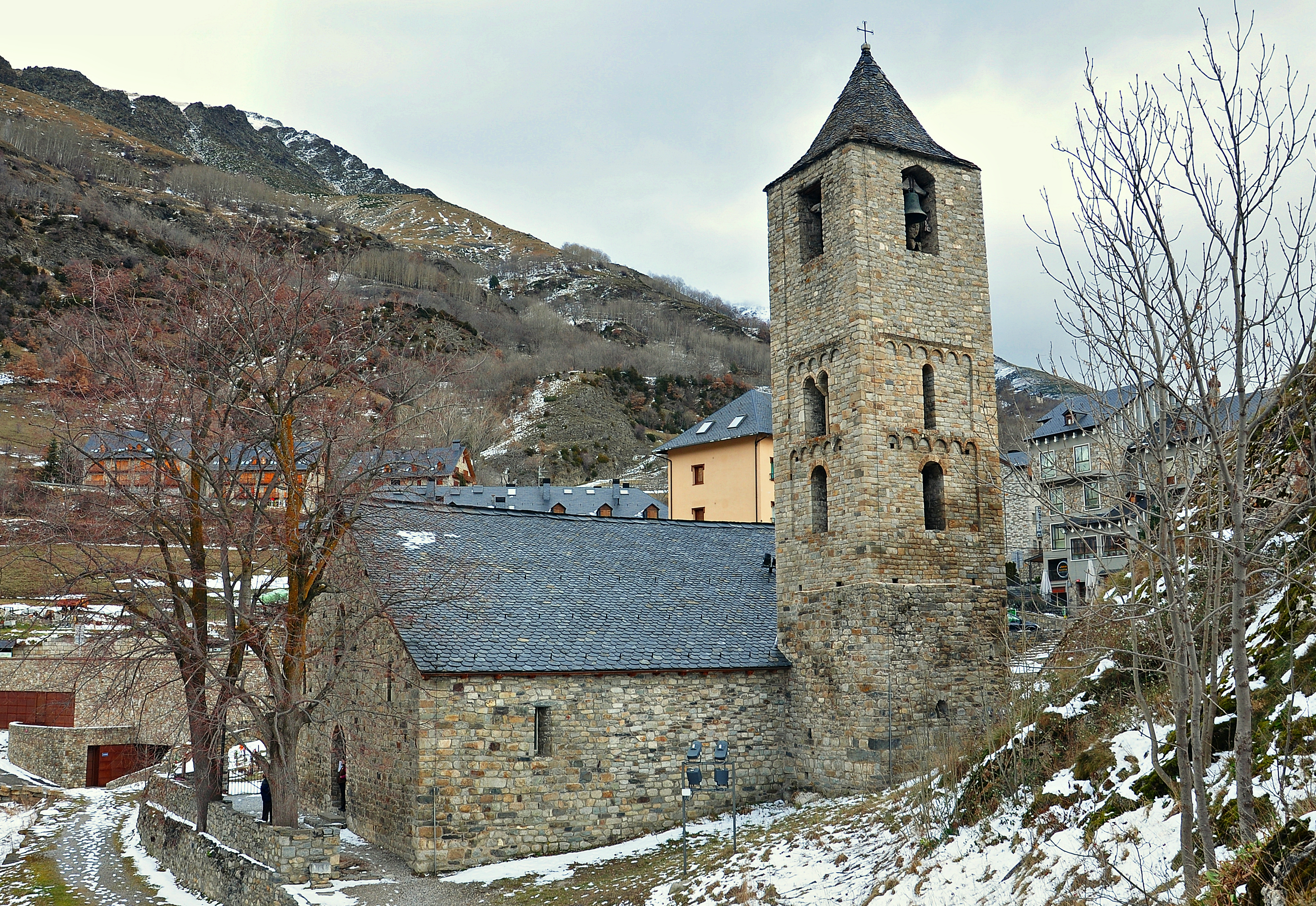
View of Sant Joan de Boí

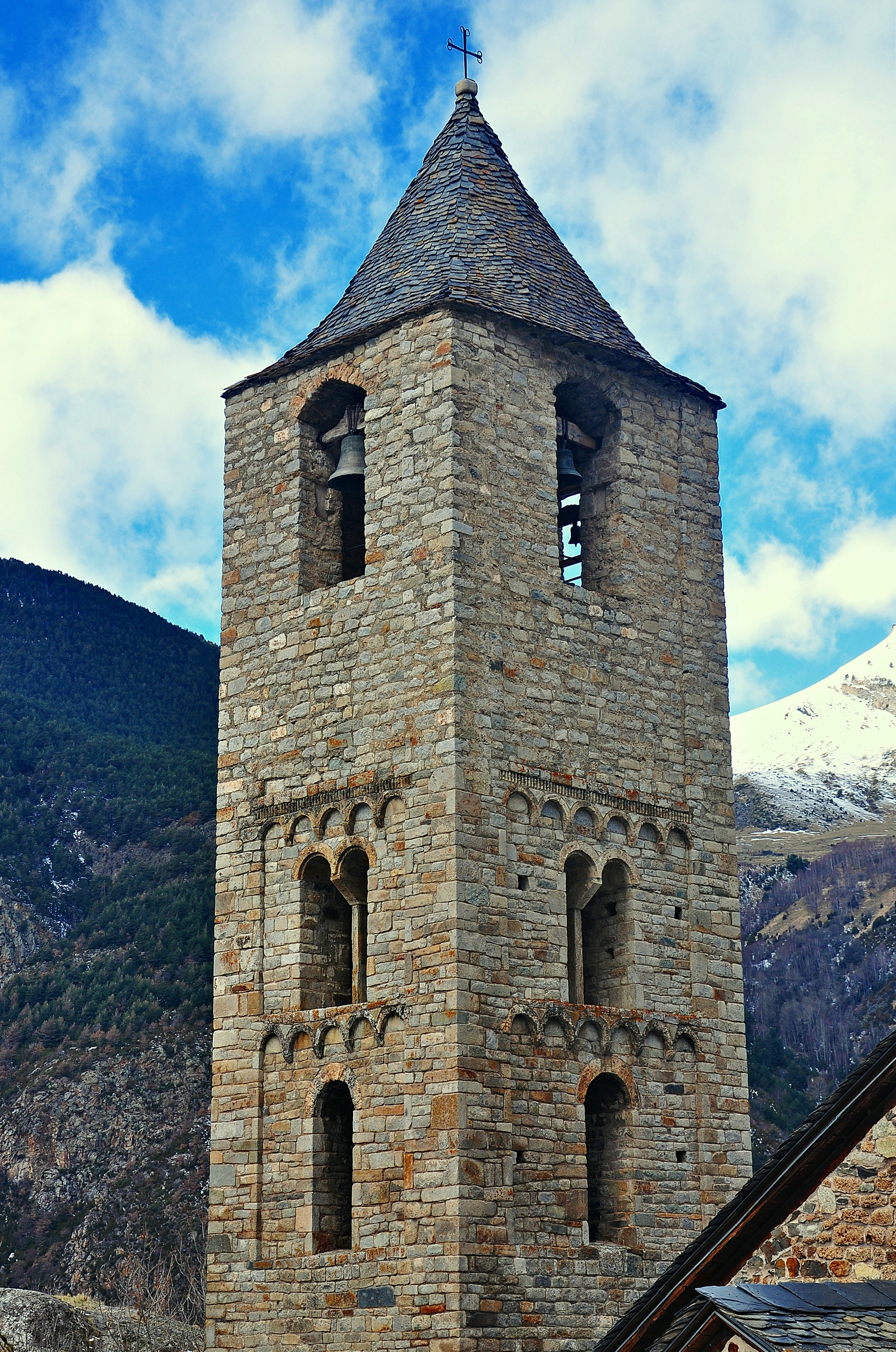
Bell-tower, Sant Joan de Boí

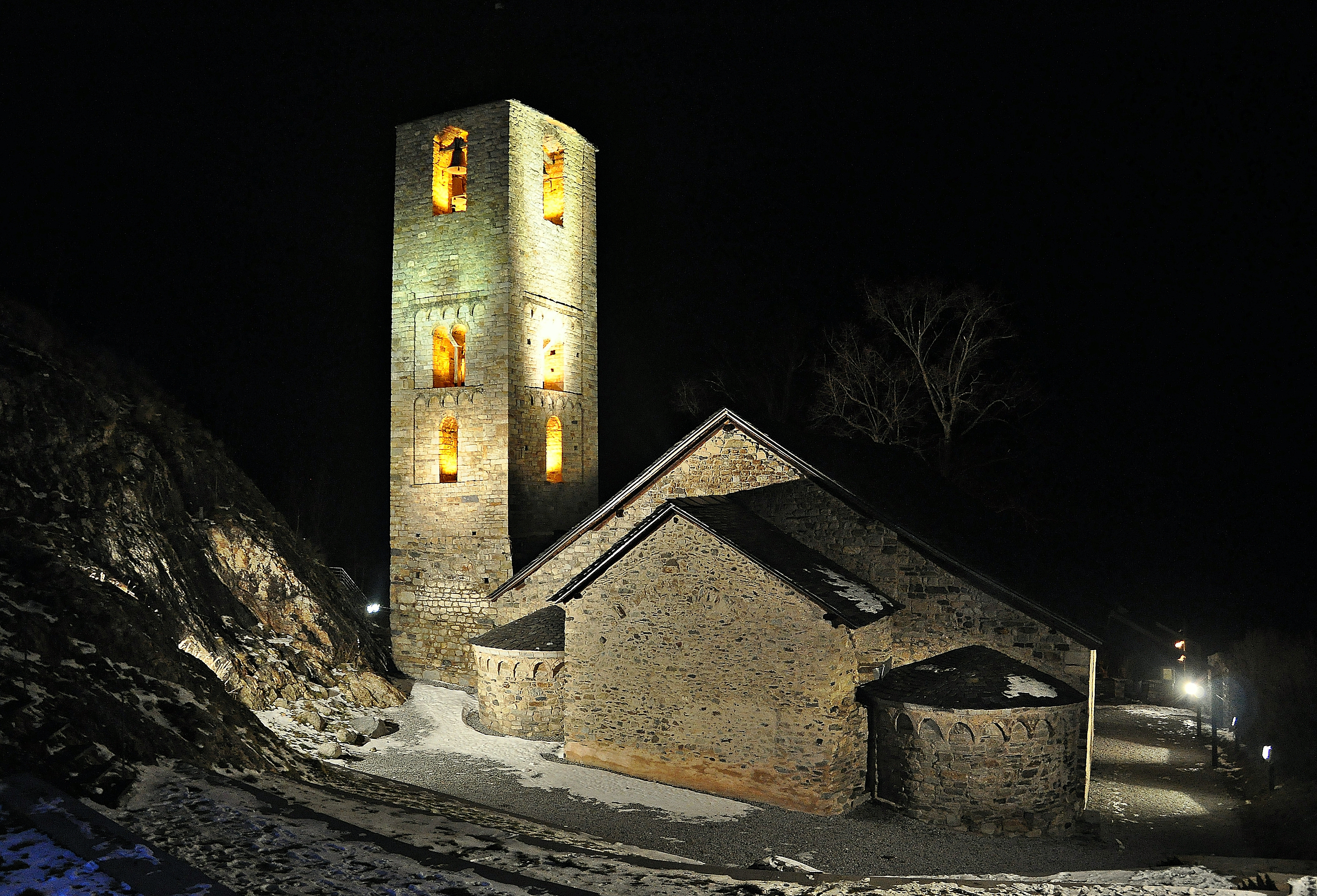
Night view of Sant Joan de Boí

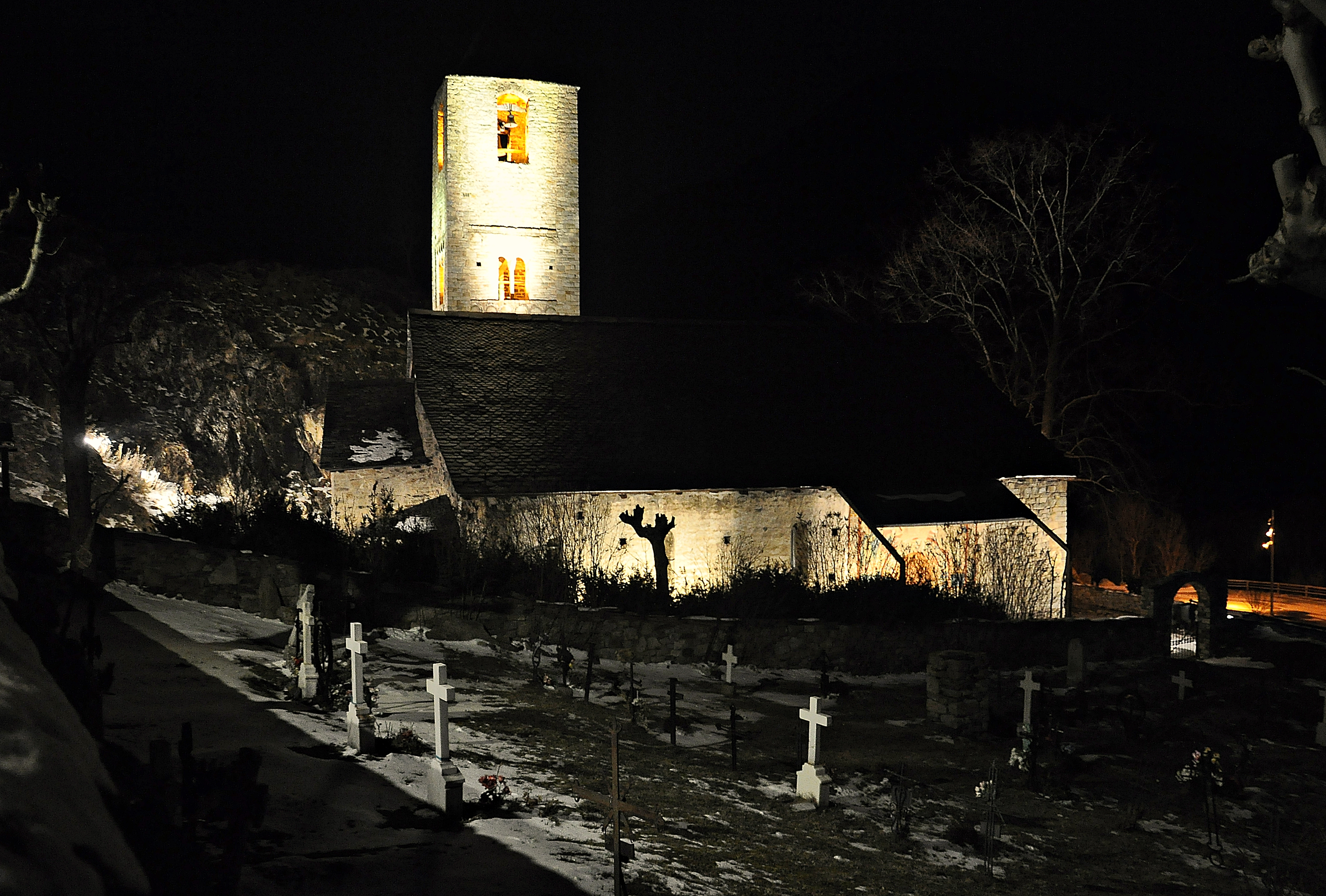
Night view of Sant Joan de Boí and cemetery

== Interior ==
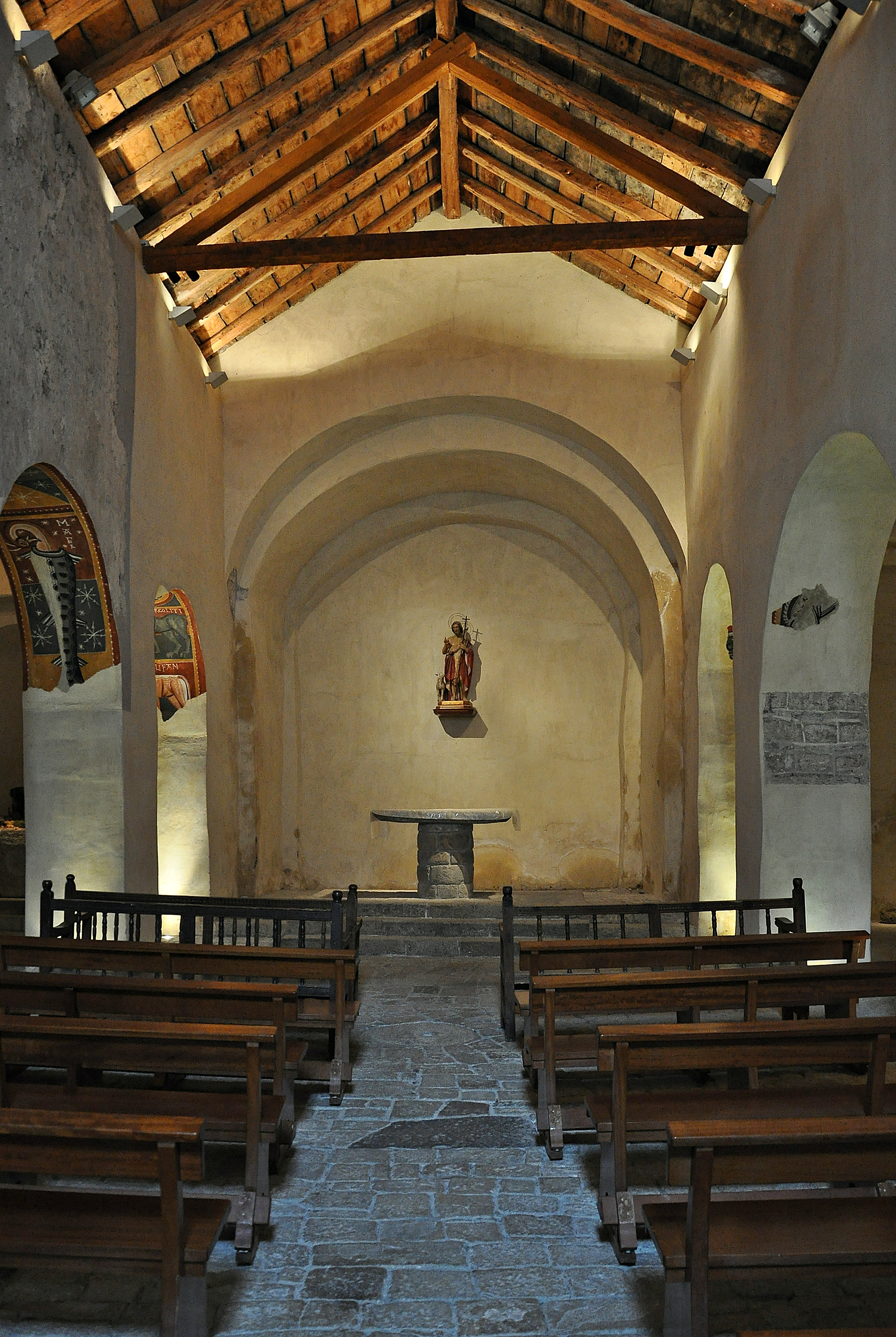
Inner view of Sant Joan de Boí

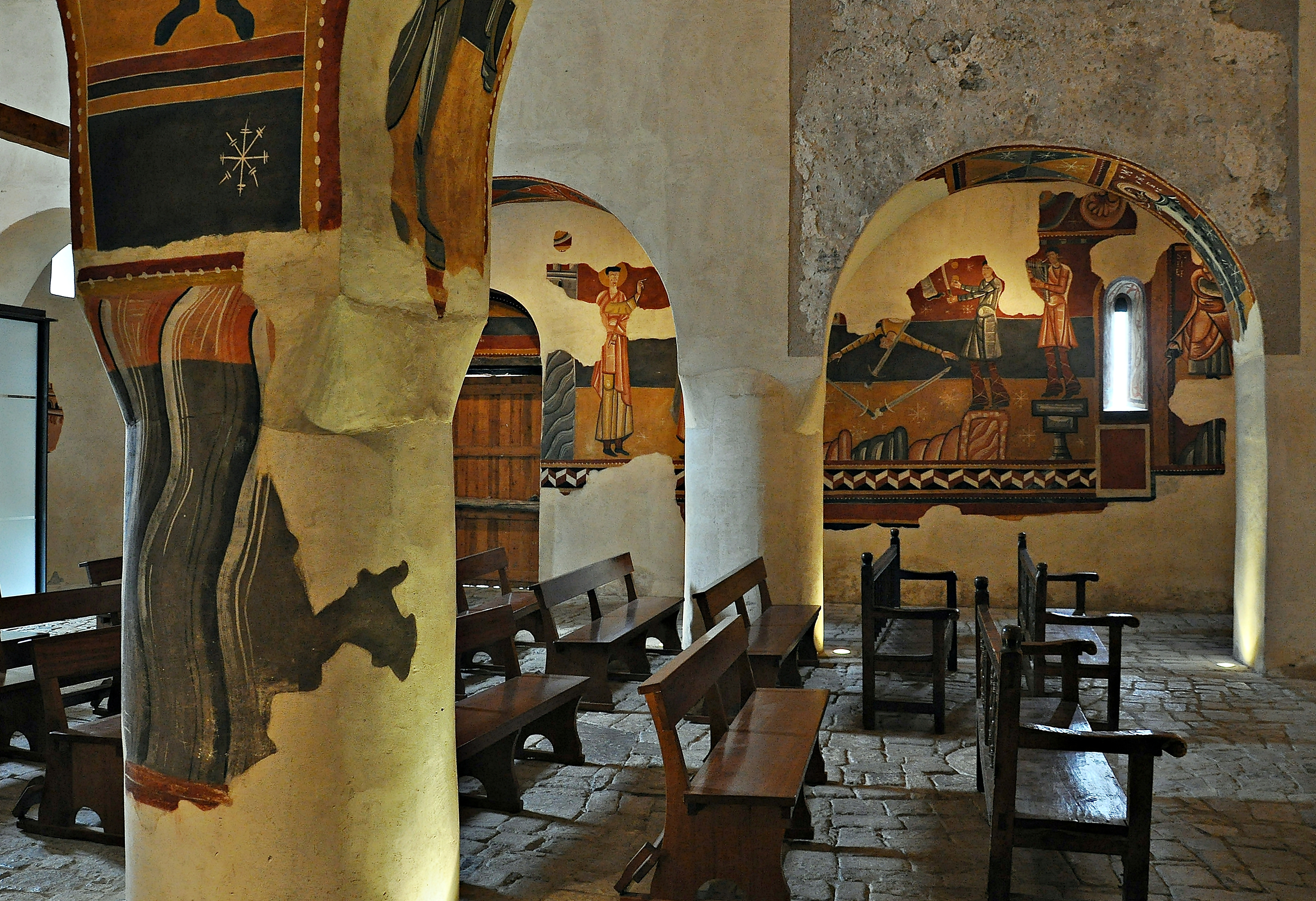
Pillars of Sant Joan de Boí

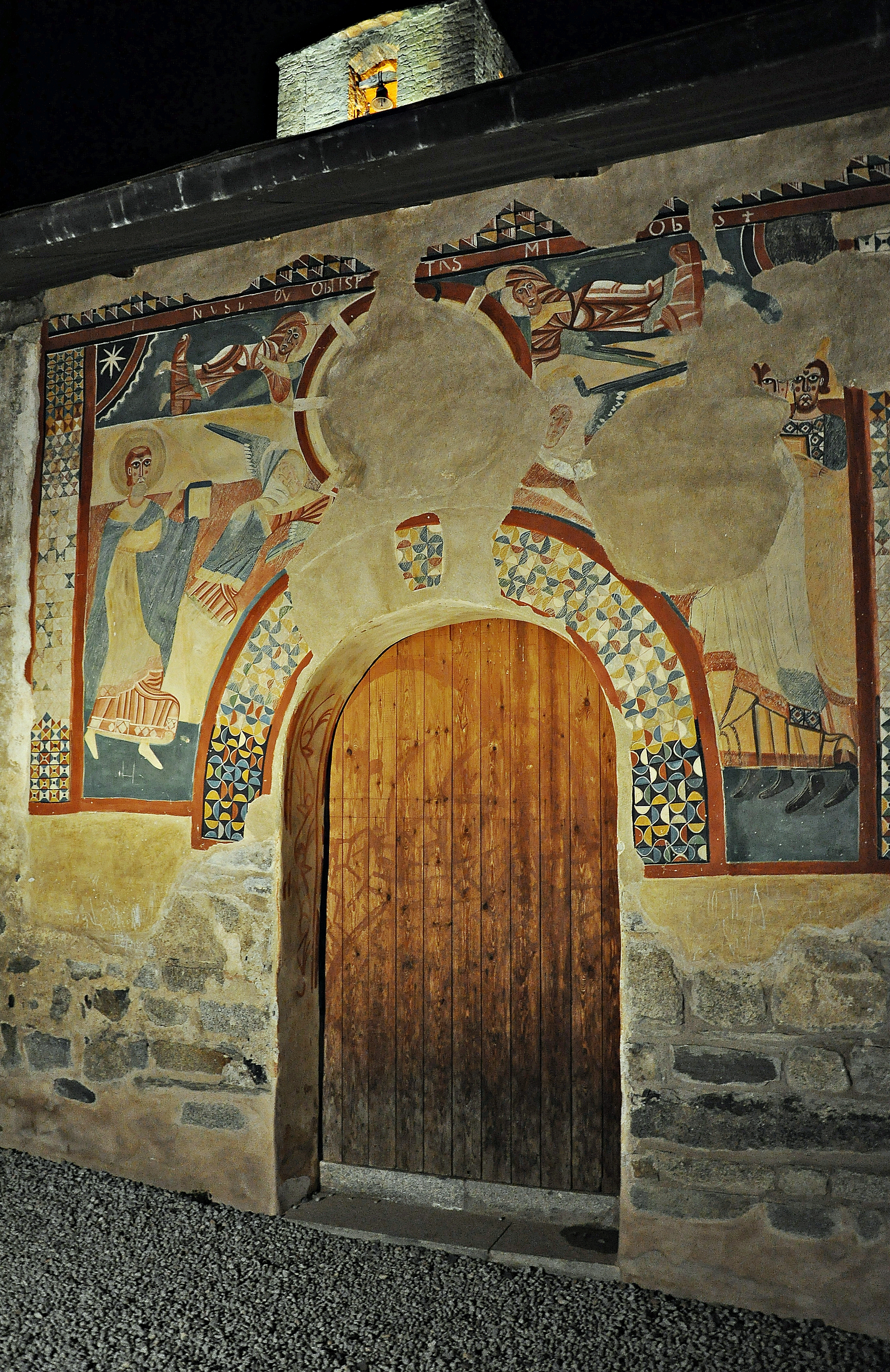
Door, Sant Joan de Boí

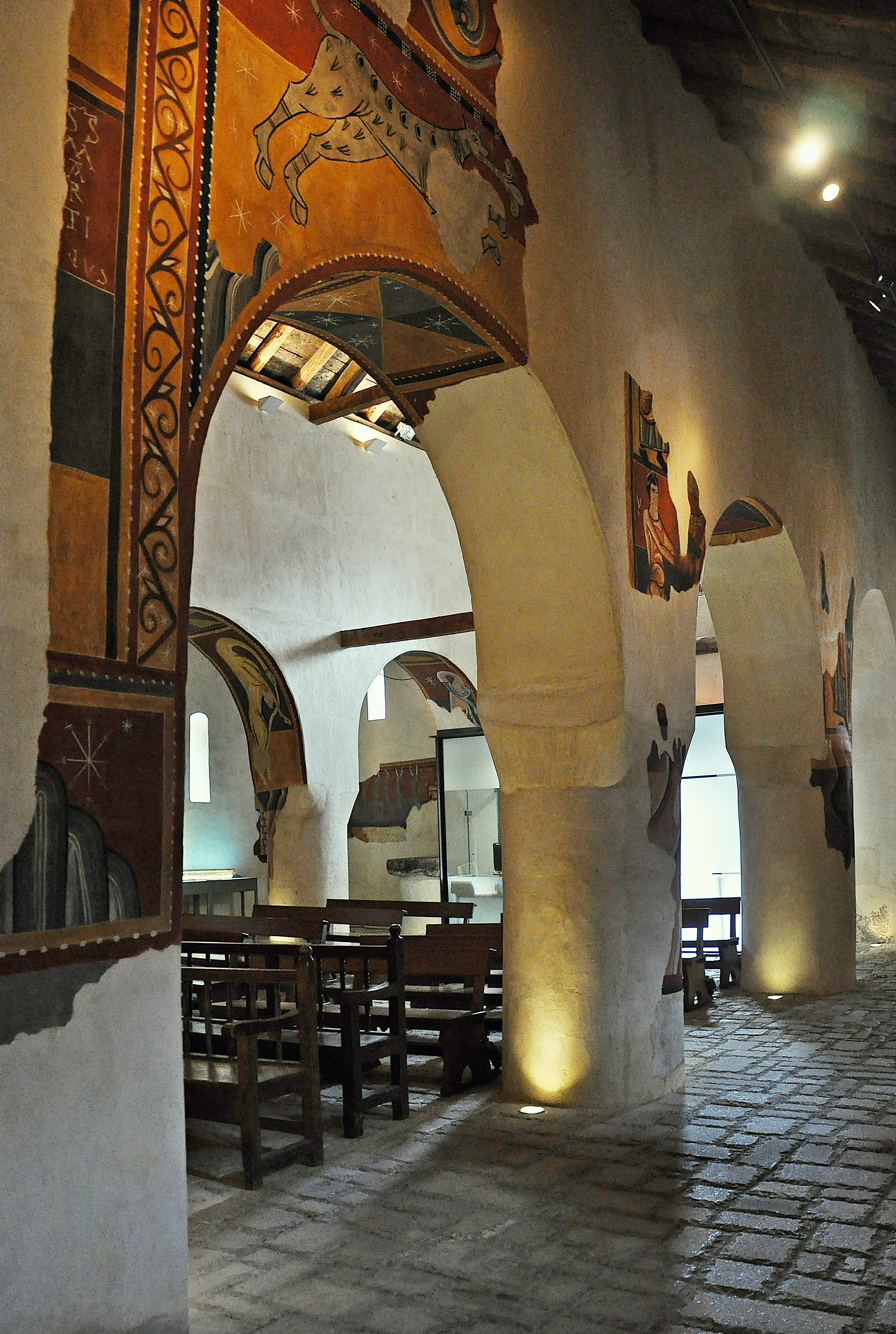
Pillars of Sant Joan de Boí
