= El Pont de Suert =

- Municipality
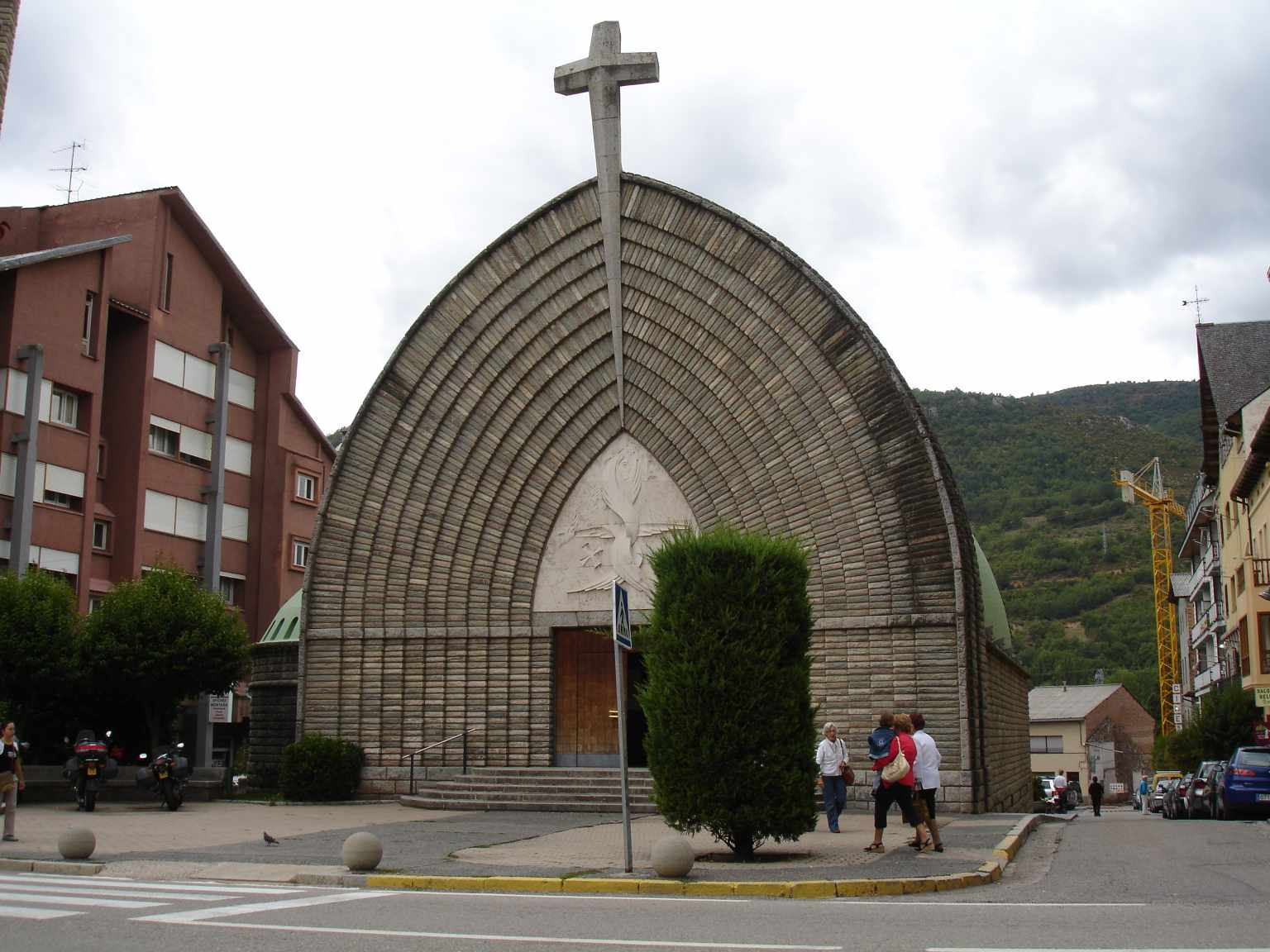

- Coat of arms

- Location in Alta Ribagorça county

- Location within Catalonia Location within Spain
- Coordinates: 42°24′22″N 0°44′22″E
- Sovereign state: Spain
- Community: Catalonia
- Region: Alt Pirineu
- County: Alta Ribagorça
- Province: Lleida

Government
  - Mayor: Iolanda Ferran Closa (Tothom El Pont de Suert) (2023)

Area
  - Total: 148.1 km^{2} (57.2 sq mi)
- Elevation: 838 m (2,749 ft)

Population (2025-01-01)
  - Total: 2,381
  - Density: 16.08/km^{2} (41.64/sq mi)
- Demonyms: Pontarrí, pontarrina
- Climate: Cfb
- Website: elpontdesuert.cat

El Pont de Suert (Western Catalan: [el ˈpɔn de suˈɛɾt], Ribagorçan: Lo Pont de Suert) is a town and municipality in the Province of Lleida, Catalonia, Spain. It is the capital of Alta Ribagorça county in the Alt Pirineu region. It is located at 838 metres above sea level, on the banks of river Noguera Ribagorçana, a tributary to the Segre. It has a population of 2,381 (register office, 2025).

It is located a short distance from the administrative border with Aragon, as well as the linguistic border between Catalan and Aranese Occitan. The local dialect is a variant of Catalan, which has some transitional traits to Aragonese.

It can be reached via the N-230 and N-260 roads.
