= Aigüestortes i Estany de Sant Maurici National Park =

National park in Spain

Parc Nacional d'Aigüestortes i Estany de Sant Maurici
- IUCN category II (national park)
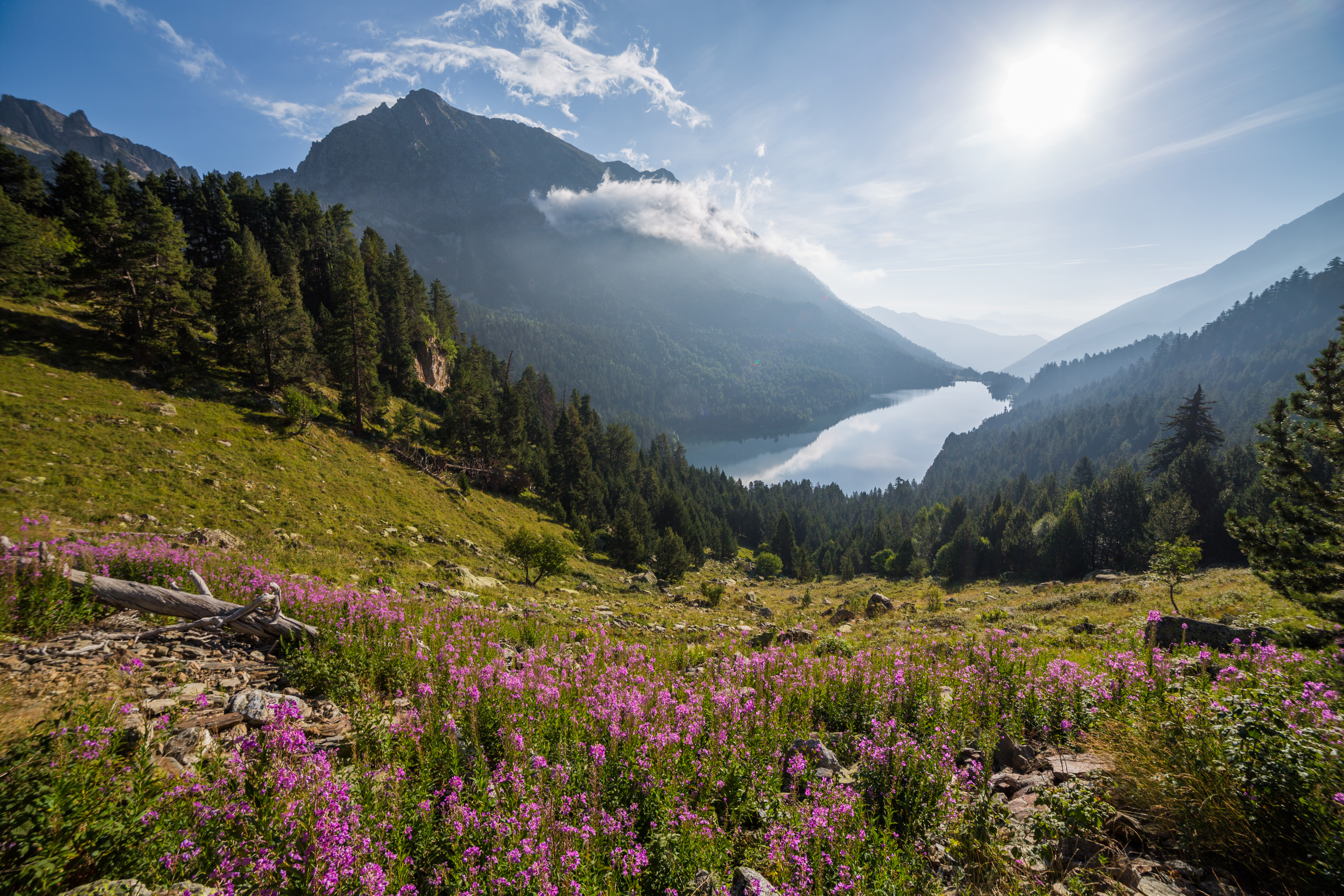
- Lake Sant Maurici
- Interactive map of Parc Nacional d'Aigüestortes i Estany de Sant Maurici
- Location: Province of Lleida, Catalonia, Spain
- Nearest city: Lleida
- Coordinates: 42°35′13″N 0°58′28″E
- Area: 141 km^{2} (54 sq mi)
- Established: 1955
- Governing body: Spanish Ministry of Environment. managed: Catalan Department of Agriculture, Livestock, Fisheries, Food, and the Environment

Ramsar Wetland
- Official name: Parque Nacional d'Aigüestortes i Estany de Sant Maurici
- Designated: 19 February 2007
- Reference no.: 1678

Aigüestortes i Estany de Sant Maurici National Park (Catalan: Parc Nacional d'Aigüestortes i Estany de Sant Maurici, Spanish: Parque Nacional de Aiguas Tortas y Lago de San Mauricio), is one of the fifteen Spanish national parks, and the only one located in Catalonia.

A wild mountain region in the Pyrenees, with peaks rising to 3017 m (Besiberri Sud) and with nearly 200 lakes, many of them of glacial origin, the park comprises a core area of 141 km^{2} and a buffer zone of 267 km^{2} surrounding the park. The park's name in Catalan is Aigüestortes i Estany de Sant Maurici, freely translated as "The winding streams and St. Maurice lake".

The park has an elevation range of 1600 to 3000 metres and contains four major vegetation zones: lower montane, upper montane, subalpine and alpine.

The fauna includes Pyrenean chamois, brown bear, marmot, ermine, roe deer, among other mammals and numerous birds (black woodpecker, common crossbill, lammergeier, golden eagle).

The park was created in 1955 after Ordesa y Monte Perdido National Park, the first Spanish national park in the Pyrenees in 1918. Its administrative seats are in Espot and Boí. The park is mainly located in the comarques of Pallars Sobirà and Alta Ribagorça. Since 2007 it has been designated as a protected Ramsar site.

== Geography ==
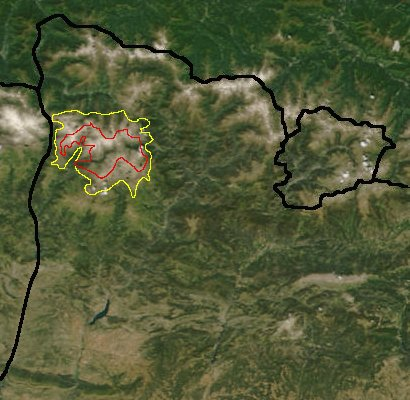
Boundaries of the park: -In red the core zone -In yellow the peripheral areas. -In black, boundaries of Lleida and Andorra.

The national park comprises 40,852 hectares (100,950 acres), divided into two different levels of protection: the core area and the buffer zone surrounding the park. This buffer zone creates a gradation from the inner side, more strictly protected than the external parts of the park.

The core area is located in the comarques of Pallars Sobirà and Alta Ribagorça, and includes the main entrances of the park:

On the west side, from the village of Boí, is the Aigüestortes plain. Aigüestortes means "winding waters" and is largely flat which allows the river to meander and flow slowly. This area indicates the existence of an old lake, today covered by sediment.

To the east, near the village of Espot, is Sant Maurici lake, one of the most famous of the region, from where one can see the spectacular twin peaks of the Encantats. This picture is one of the symbols of the park and is the logo of the park.

This area also includes part of the municipalities of Vielha e Mijaran and Naut Aran in the Val d'Aran; Vilaller and Vall de Boí in the Alta Ribagorça; La Torre de Cabdella in the Pallars Jussà; and Espot, Alt Àneu, Esterri d'Àneu, La Guingueta d'Àneu and Sort in the Pallars Sobirà.

The buffer zone also contains the forest of la Mata de Valencia, Gerber and Cabanes valleys, Colomers and Saboredo valleys, the Besiberri valley, the lakes of Cabdella and Montardo peak.

== History ==
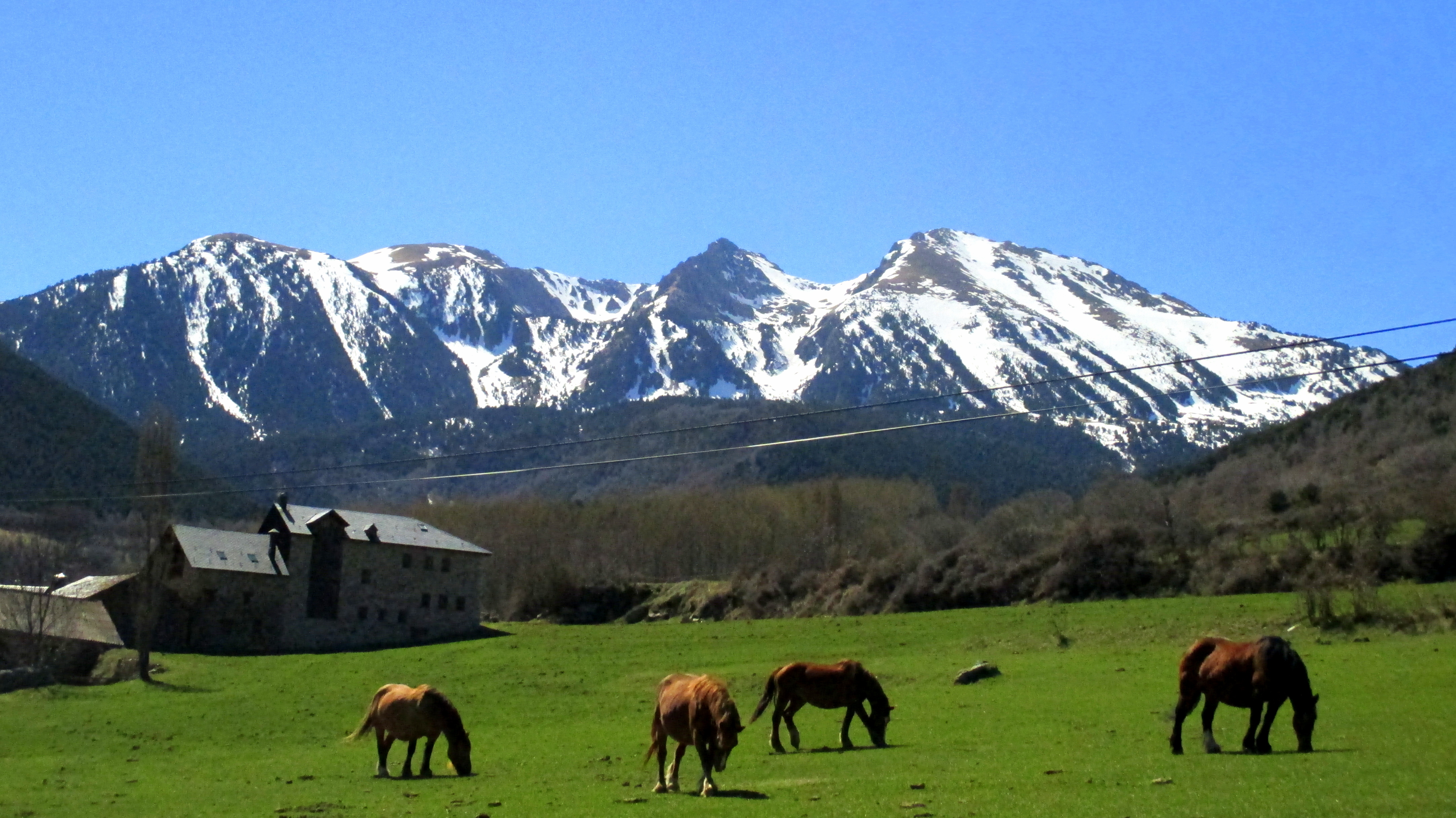
Aigüestortes National Park from Son

Human settlement of the Pyrenees dates back at least to the period of glacial melting. Inside the borders of the national park, there is no record of stable human habitation during this time, but recent archeological studies have found evidence of temporary settlements from 8,500 years ago in the Neolithic Age.

During the 19th century, the high Pyrenees became more populated, fueled by strong demand for natural resources with intense forestry, farming, and fishing. At the beginning of the 20th century, hydroelectric electrical power plants were built, resulting in a great transformation of the landscape.

On 21 October 1955 the national park was created, becoming the fifth Spanish national park. On 30 March 1988, the Catalan government took ownership of the park, together with an additional buffer zone, according to the Catalan laws. From that date, management of the wild protected areas has been managed by the autonomous government, which has introduced increases to the budget and staffing, along with stricter rules.

Since then, forestry exploitation, fishing, camping and any exploitation of natural resources has been forbidden. However, an allowance is made for cattle breeding and the operative hydroelectric generation. Traditional uses of natural resources which are compatible with the protection of the wilderness are only allowed in the buffer zone.

In 1996 the national park was enlarged, to a total area of 14,119 hectares.

In 1997, after litigation between Catalan and Spanish laws, it was agreed that autonomous regions can also take part in the management of the national parks.

== Biology ==
The park has an elevation range from 1600 to 3000 metres and different orientation of the valleys. For that reason very different ecosystems can be found inside the park.

=== Vegetation ===
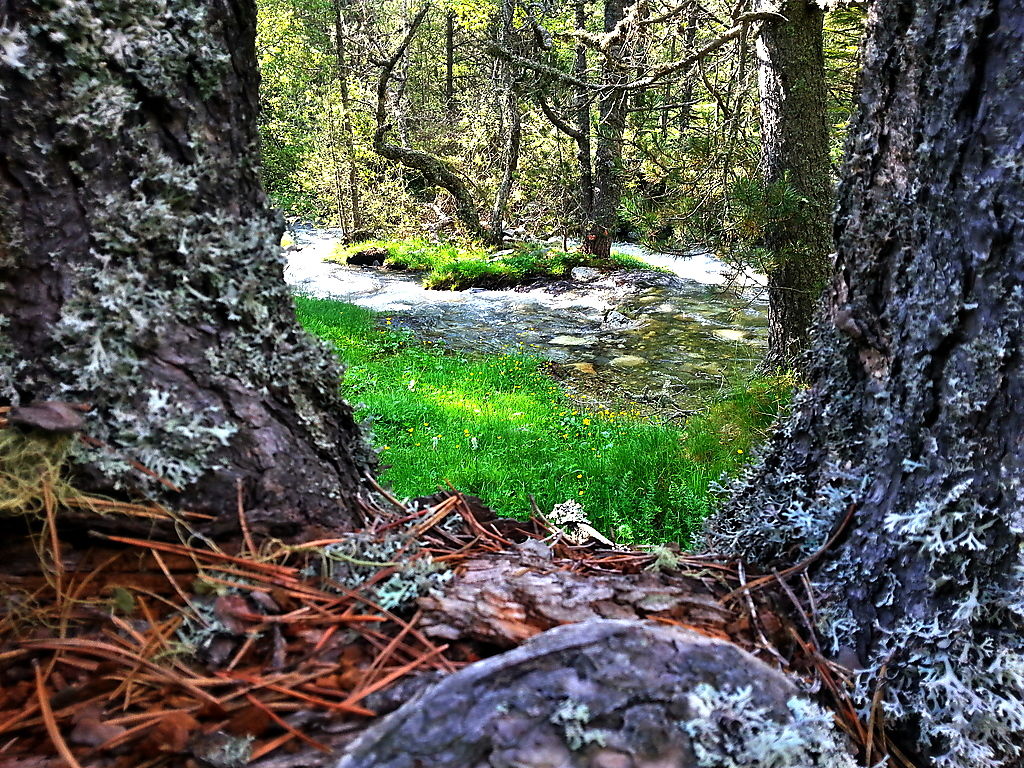
Aigüestortes vegetation

The park has a great variety of alpine vegetation owing to the large range of altitudes. In the lower parts of the valleys, around 1500 m high, typical European deciduous forests with pubescens oak Quercus humilis, European ash Fraxinus excelsior, beech Fagus sylvatica or common hazel Corylus avellana can be found. However, former meadow and pastureland which have been historically exploited by humans are now typically occupied with grasslands and shrubs, dominated by common box Buxus sempervirens or secondary forests with Scots pine Pinus sylvestris.

From 1500 m to beyond 2000 m, the dominant vegetation is mountain pine Pinus uncinata forest. Growing at altitudes up to 2400 m, it is the tree best adapted to survive the long, hard winters of the High Pyrenees. At this altitude, alpenrose Rhododendron ferrugineum, and blueberry Vaccinium myrtillus which prefers cooler locations, can be found. Heather Calluna vulgaris" or common juniper Juniperus communis prefers more sunny and dry areas. In the north faces at less than 2000 m, there are important silver fir Abies alba forests. La Mata de Valencia is the largest Pyrenean fir tree forest.

In the alpine meadows, above 2300 m where trees cannot survive, it is possible to find various other alpine flora species, such as Gentiana alpina.

Approximately 8% of the species of the park are endemic to the Pyrenees. Around 7% they are plants with boreo-alpine or artico-alpine distribution, with most of them having arrived in the Pyrenees during the last Ice Age. The most important group of the national park flora belongs to the Eurosiberian group, the typical species from central Europe.

=== Animals ===
Animals are not easily spotted in the national park. However, there are about 200 species from the phylum Chordata present, of which two-thirds are birds. Some of the most important ones are capercaillie (Tetrao urogallus), rock ptarmigan (Lagopus muta), golden eagle (Aquila chrysaetos), griffon vulture (Gyps fulvus) and bearded vulture (Gypaetus barbatus). Also possible to see are black woodpecker (Dryocopus martius), red-billed chough (Pyrrhocorax pyrrhocorax), wallcreeper (Tichodroma muraria), white-throated dipper (Cinclus cinclus), citril finch (Serinus citrinella) among others.

Most representative mammal species are Pyrenean chamois (Rupicapra pyrenaica), brown bear (Ursus arctos), stoat (Mustela erminea), alpine marmot (Marmota marmota) (which is not native), fallow deer (Dama dama) and roe deer (Capreolus capreolus) which were also introduced in the national park during the second half of the 20th century.

Among the amphibians, the Pyrenean brook salamander (Euproctus asper) is significant but not easy to spot. The common frog (Rana temporaria) is more or less common. It's necessary to be aware of vipera aspis (Vipera aspis), a viper species with a venomous bite, but they will not usually attack without provocation.

In the lakes and rivers, brown trout (Salmo trutta fario), the local trout, shares the region with other introduced species.

== Geology and climate ==
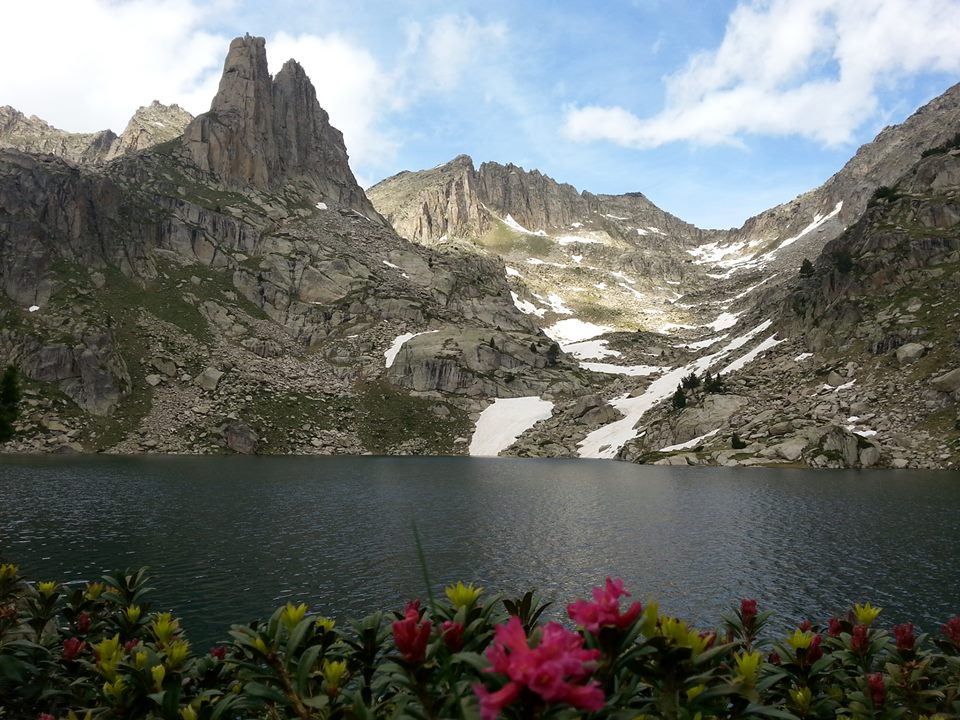

Aigüestortes National Park is an important item in the Pyrenean geology. The predominant rocks are granite and slate, both very old Paleozoic rocks. These emerged from the sea in the Paleogene, during the Alpine orogeny, giving rise to the Pyrenees.

Successive quaternary glaciations covered these mountains with huge glaciers. The lakes, the waterfalls, the sharpened peaks, the vertiginous ridges and the U-shaped valleys are the footprints of the erosive action of those ancient glaciers. Today, they have virtually disappeared, except for small glaciers in the central Pyrenees.

Today, lakes are the most important contribution of these glaciers, which are fed by rivers and waterfalls.

The climate in the park is predominantly cold. The mean temperature is around 0 to 5 °C. In the upper parts, temperatures hardly reach above 0 °C during winter. Mean annual precipitation ranges from 900 to 1300 mm – Mostly as snow in the mountains.

== Management and information ==
44% of the territory is government owned. Only 6% of the land has private owners, with the village of Espot extending into the eastern part of the park. Even so, exploitation of natural resources is forbidden in the strictly national park.

Public use is one of the most important objectives for national parks and people have the right to visit and walk within it.

=== Information centres ===
The park has information centres widely distributed in the area. Boí is one of the main centres of the park. It has also a public library and an exhibition about the settlement of the Pyrenees and the adaptations to live in the mountains.

The Park Information Center at Espot also provides an exhibition about the three leading things of the park: rock, water and life.

The Museum of the Shepherds is in Llessui, where the exhibition shows the traditional life and work of the shepherds from this valley.

Senet has an information center explaining the evolution of the park in the relation between humans and animals: a history about competition, exploitation and good fellowship.

During summer months a little information centre is open in Estany Gento, and a cable railway runs in the higher valley of Torre de Cabdella. There are some explanations about the water and the national park.

From all of these centres, it is possible to participate in different organised activities.

=== Tourism ===
Tourist activities are regulated. Walking access is free, but it is forbidden to collect any rocks, plants, flowers or mushrooms, and hunting and fishing is prohibited. Camping is also prohibited.

It is not possible to enter the park by private car. In Espot or Boí, walkers can hire 4x4 taxis which can transport them to a number of popular locations within the park, such as the Aigüestortes plain or Sant Maurici lake.

At the Val d'Aran entrances during the summertime, there is also a taxi service that provides easier access to the Colomers or Restanca shelters. At the Vall Fosca, the southern entrance of the park, a cableway connects Sallente with estany Gento, where some nice day walks begin.

=== Trekking ===
Summer is a popular time for trekking. The transpyrenean path, GR-11 marked with red and white lines, crosses the park from one side to other.

At the information points, hiking brochures available (also in English) which are recommended and shows many of the easy paths with descriptions. Some of them are:

- At Boí valley, from Llebreta Lake to Llong Lake, following Sant Nicolau River. Along this path, a footbridge allows the handicapped people with wheelchairs to visit the Aigüestortes plain.
- From Espot and the Sant Maurici Lake, an interesting path goes up to the waterfall and Ratera Lake. From this lake, after 15 minutes additional walking, it is possible to arrive at a viewpoint looking over the Sant Maurici Lake. A second option is to walk up to Amitges shelter which provides walkers with experience of the high mountains.
- From the parking area of Clot Gran, near the Port de la Bonaigua, to Gerber valley and lakes.
- From Banhs de Tredòs, at the Val d'Aran, walk to Colomers shelter – this provides a very spectacular walk with a number of lakes.
- From Estany Gento, walk to Tort Lake and arrive to the Colomina shelter or Saburó Lake.
- Camins vius (Living Paths). This route is a walk along the historic valley paths, most dating back to medieval times and some of more ancient origin, through villages surrounding the national park, passing through Alta Ribagorça, Val d'Aran, and Pallars Sobirà.
- Carros de foc (Chariots of Fire). This route completes a circular tour around some of the shelters that exist in this area. The competitive option (Sky runner) must be completed in less than 24 hours but it's better to have at least four or five days in order to appreciate the experience that this route provides.

Other mountain activities as rock climbing, alpinism, snowshoeing or backcountry skiing are also allowed (with some regulations) in the national park. The mountain shelters, the only places where visitors are permitted spend a night into the park, are available to stay for allow traversing the higher peaks in the park.

=== Mountain biking ===
Cycling is only allowed on paved routes inside the park (just to Sant Maurici Lake or Aigüestortes plain) and is strictly regulated. Some routes are available in the peripheral area, most of them with medium or hard level.

- Pedals de Foc: is an organized route for riding around the park (not inside) for several days and possibility of backpacking transfer.

== Refuges ==
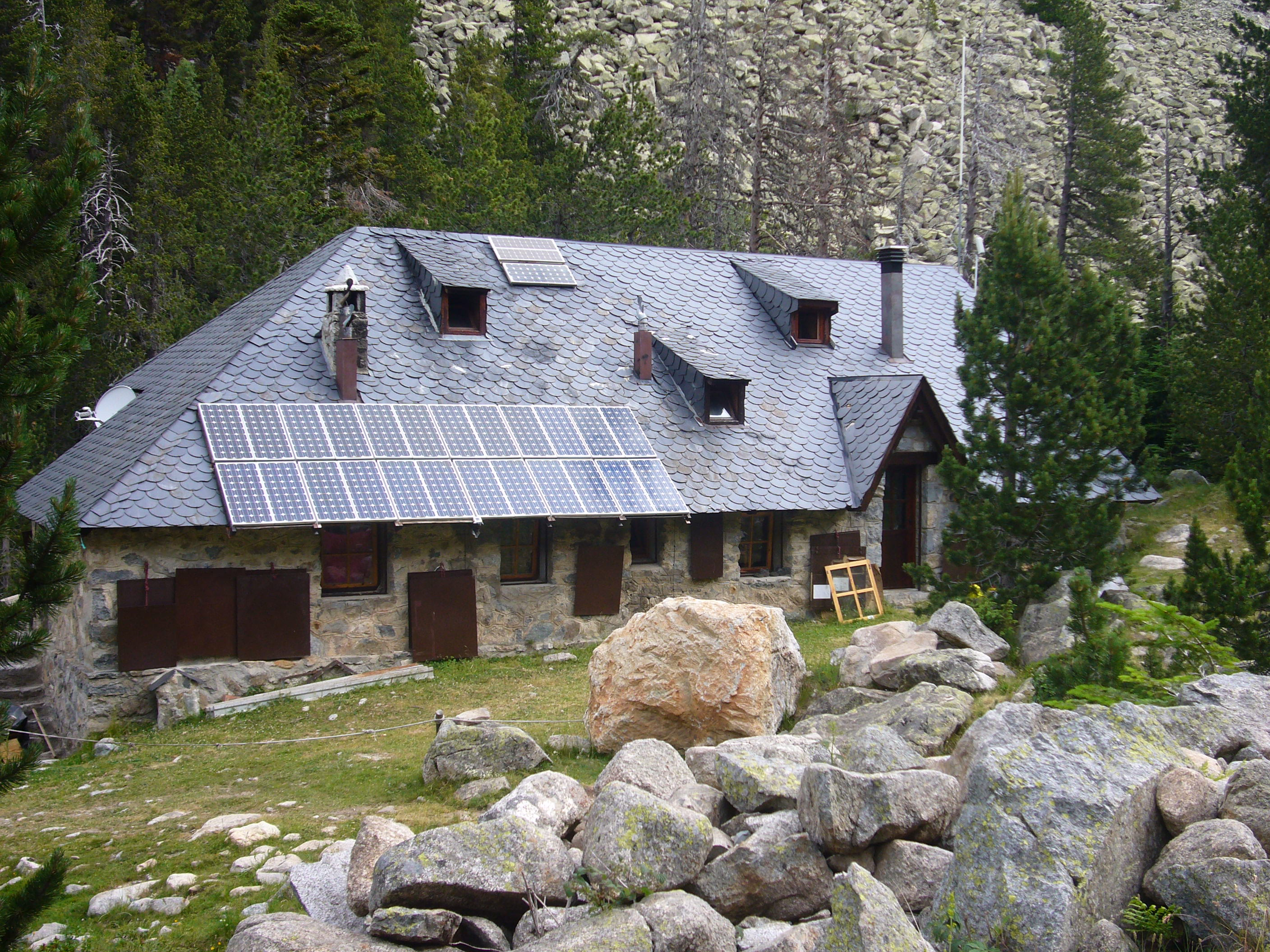
Estany Llong refuge, at the Aigüestortes i Estany de Sant Maurici National Park

Trekkers can find up to ten guarded refuges in the park and its periphery. These refuges are open during the four warmest months of the year. In the winter, every refuge has its own opening schedule (usually around Christmas and Easter) and must be booked in advance. The refuges are as follows:

- Amitges
- Colomers
- Colomina
- Ernest Mallafré
- Estany Llong
- Josep Mª Blanc
- Pla de la Font
- Restanca
- Saboredo
- Ventosa i Calvell

Additionally, there are two unguarded but well-equipped refuges (Mataró and Besiberri).

== Surroundings ==
There is a rich architectural heritage in the region, including the Catalan Romanesque churches of the Vall de Boí. UNESCO declared it a World Heritage Site in November 2000. A good example is the Sant Climent de Taüll church.

== Gallery ==
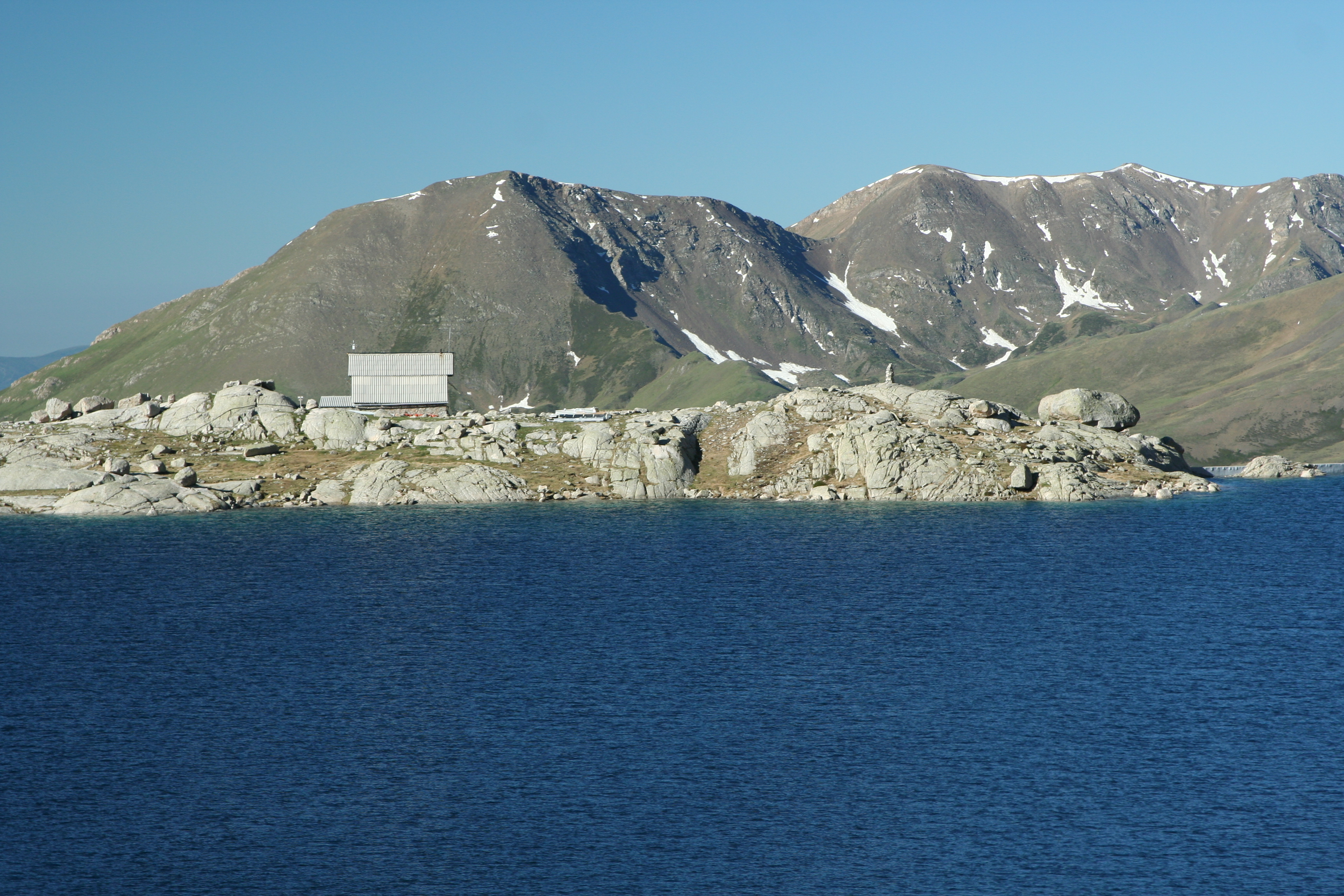
Refugi Colomina

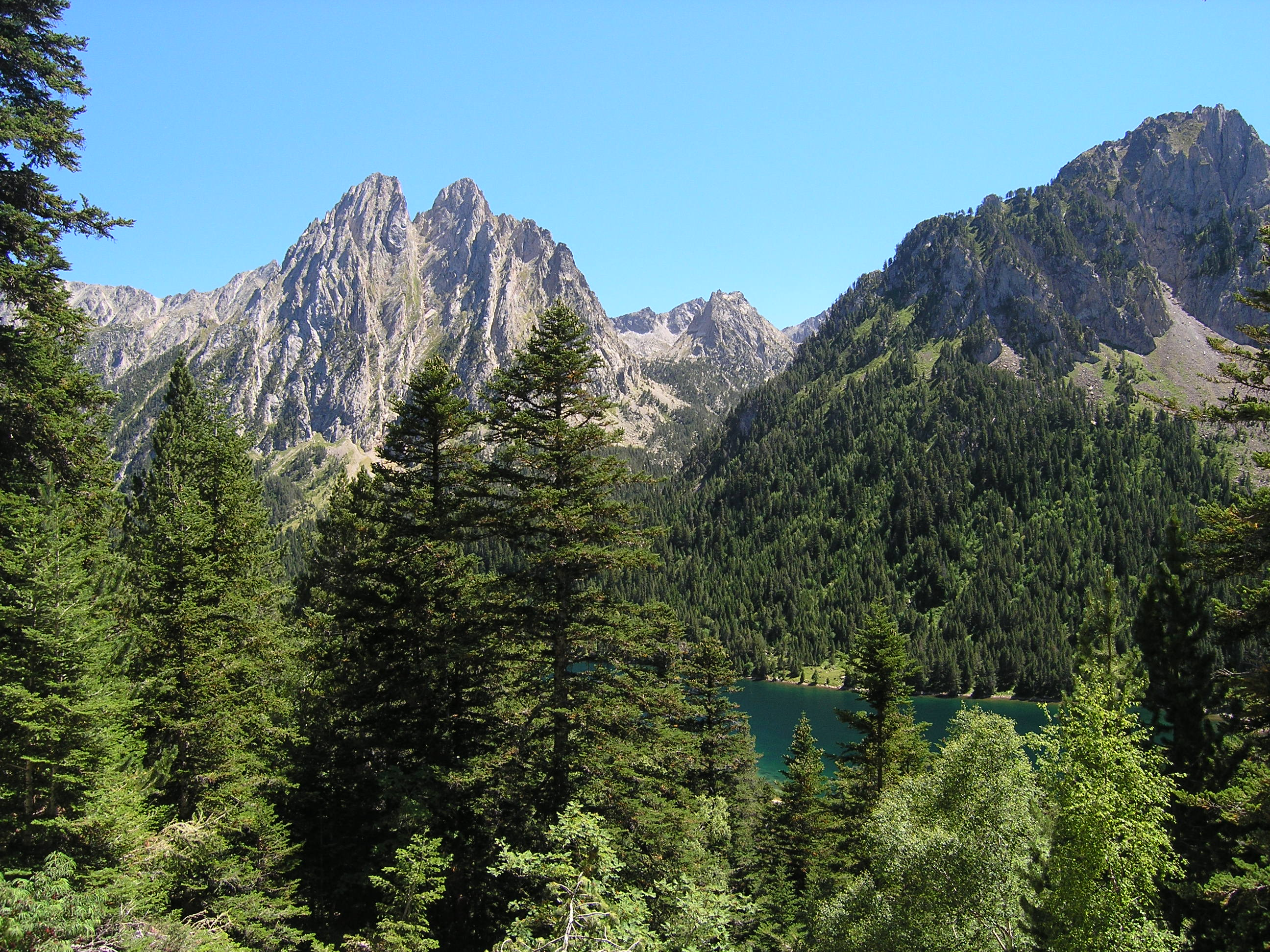
Sant Maurici lake

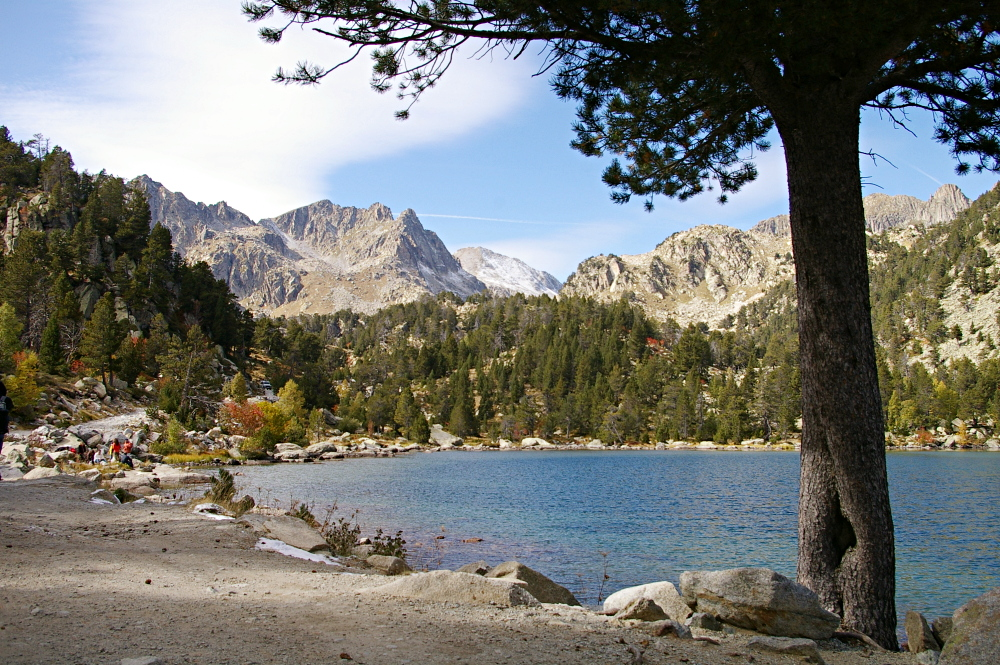
Pond de Ratera
