= Alta Ribagorça =

Coordinates: 42°27′48″N 0°49′47″E

- Comarca
- Country: Spain
- Autonomous community: Catalonia
- Province: Lleida
- Region: Alt Pirineu
- Capital: Pont de Suert
- Municipalities: List: El Pont de Suert, Vall de Boí, Vilaller

Government
  - Body: Alta Ribagorça Comarcal Council
  - President: Albert Palacín (ERC)

Area
  - Total: 426.8 km^{2} (164.8 sq mi)

Population (2014)
  - Total: 3,873
  - Density: 9.075/km^{2} (23.50/sq mi)
- Demonym: Ribagorçan
- Time zone: UTC+1 (CET)
  - Summer (DST): UTC+2 (CEST)
- Largest municipality: Pont de Suert
- Website: www.altaribagorça.cat

Alta Ribagorça (Western Catalan: [ˈalta riβaˈɣɔɾsa]) is a comarca in the Alt Pirineu region, in Catalonia, Spain. Its capital is El Pont de Suert. The highest peak is the Comaloformo (3030 metres above sea level) in the massif of Bessiberri. Northeast of the region is the western part of the Aigüestortes i Estany de Sant Maurici National Park. It is connected with the Aran Valley through the Vielha tunnel.

The Catalan Romanesque Churches of the Vall de Boí are UNESCO World Heritage Sites. In the North-East of the area there is the Aigüestortes i Estany de Sant Maurici National Park, which attracts an important number of visitors.

The local Ribagorçan dialect is a variant of Catalan, which has some transitional traits to Aragonese.

Location:

- Farthest east point: 0° 58' 27,80" East longitude.
- Farthest west point: 0° 41' 30,24" East longitude.
- Farthest north point: 42° 37' 58,88" North latitude.
- Farthest south point: 42° 18' 0,07" North latitude.

Highest point: Comaloformo (3030 m) in the Bessiberri Range.

== Municipalities ==
Municipality	Population (2014)	Area km^{2}
El Pont de Suert	2,318	148.1
Vall de Boí	992	219.5
Vilaller	563	59.2
• Total: 3	3,873	426.8
