= La Nativitat de Durro =

Church building in Durro, Spain

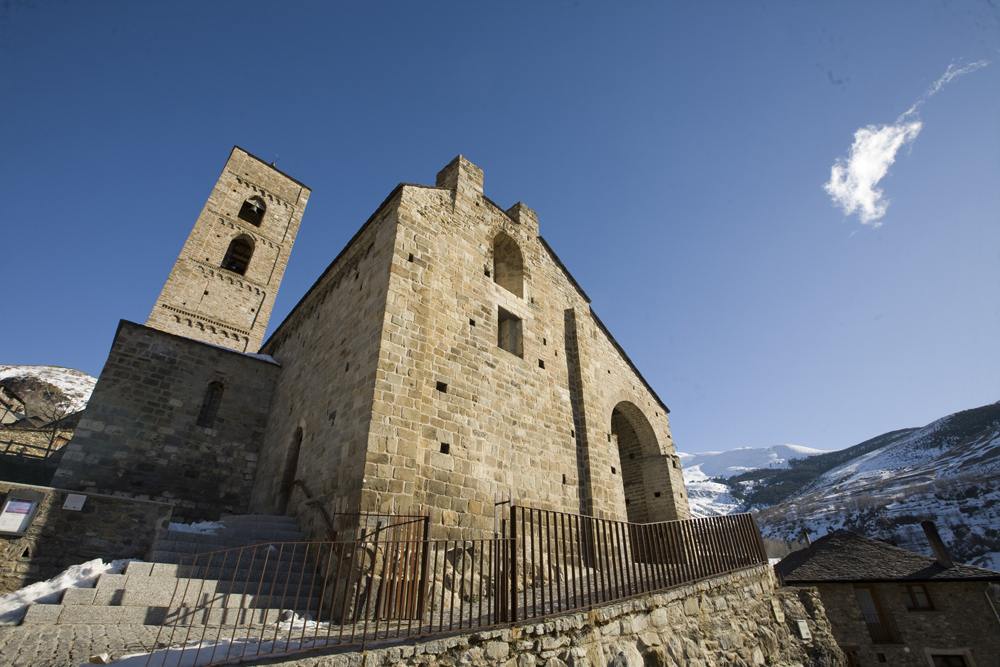

- Location within Spain

Religion
- Affiliation: Roman Catholic

Location
- Location: Durro, Catalonia, Spain
- Interactive map of La Nativitat de Durro
- Coordinates: 42°29′53″N 0°49′14″E

Architecture
- Type: Church
- Style: Romanesque
- UNESCO World Heritage Site
- Official name: Catalan Romanesque Churches of the Vall de Boí
- Type: Cultural
- Criteria: ii, iv
- Designated: 2000 (24th session)
- Reference no.: 988-007
- Region: Europe and North America

La Nativitat de Durro (named in the honour of nativity of Mary) is a church situated in the village of Durro, in the territory of Vall de Boí, a commune in the valley with the same name and in Comarca of Alta Ribagorça in the north of Province of Lleida and the autonomous communities of Catalonia in Spain.

It is part of the world heritage site of UNESCO with eight other Catalan Romanesque Churches of the Vall de Boí.

== Architecture ==
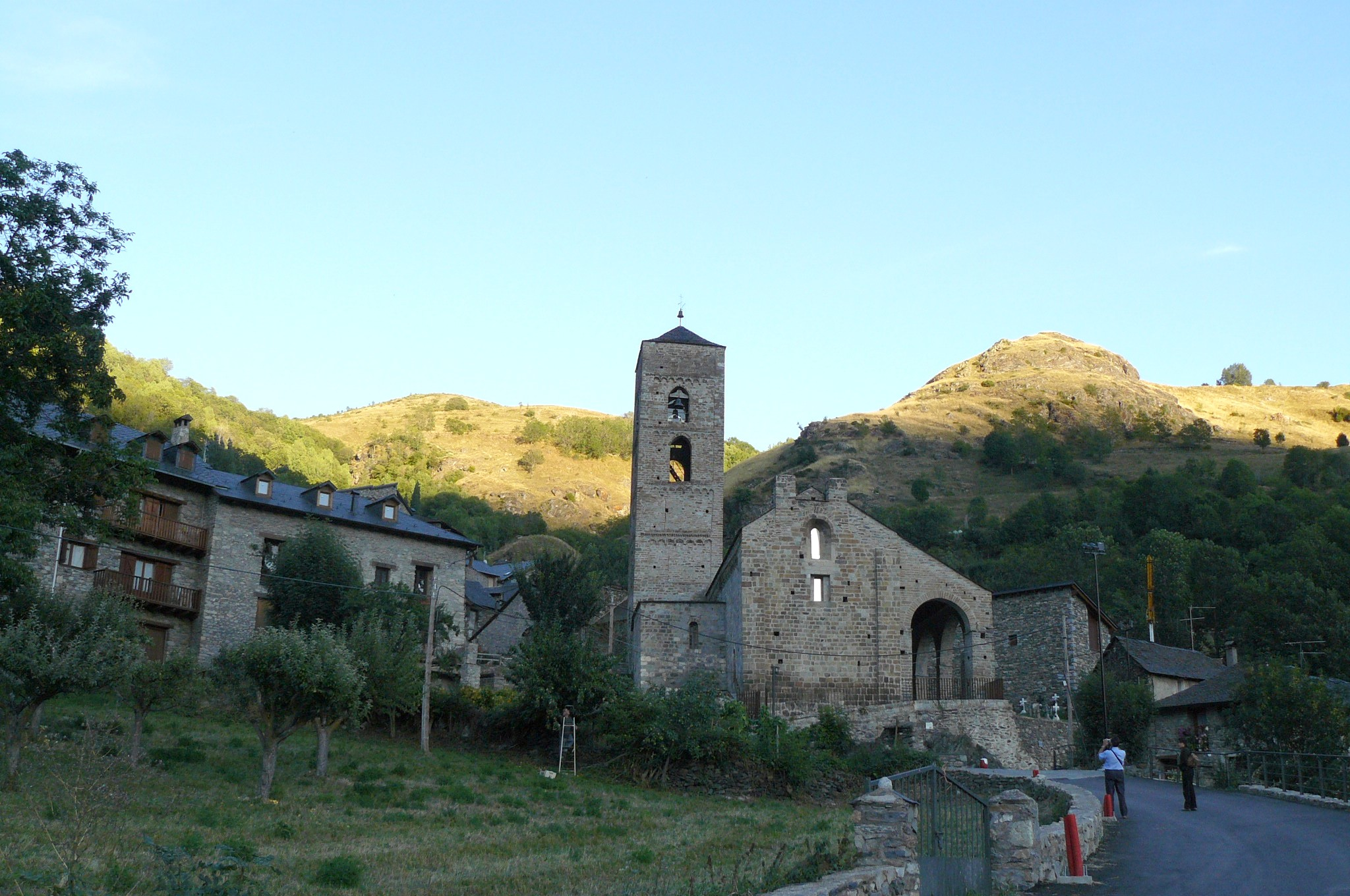
View of La Nativitat de Durro

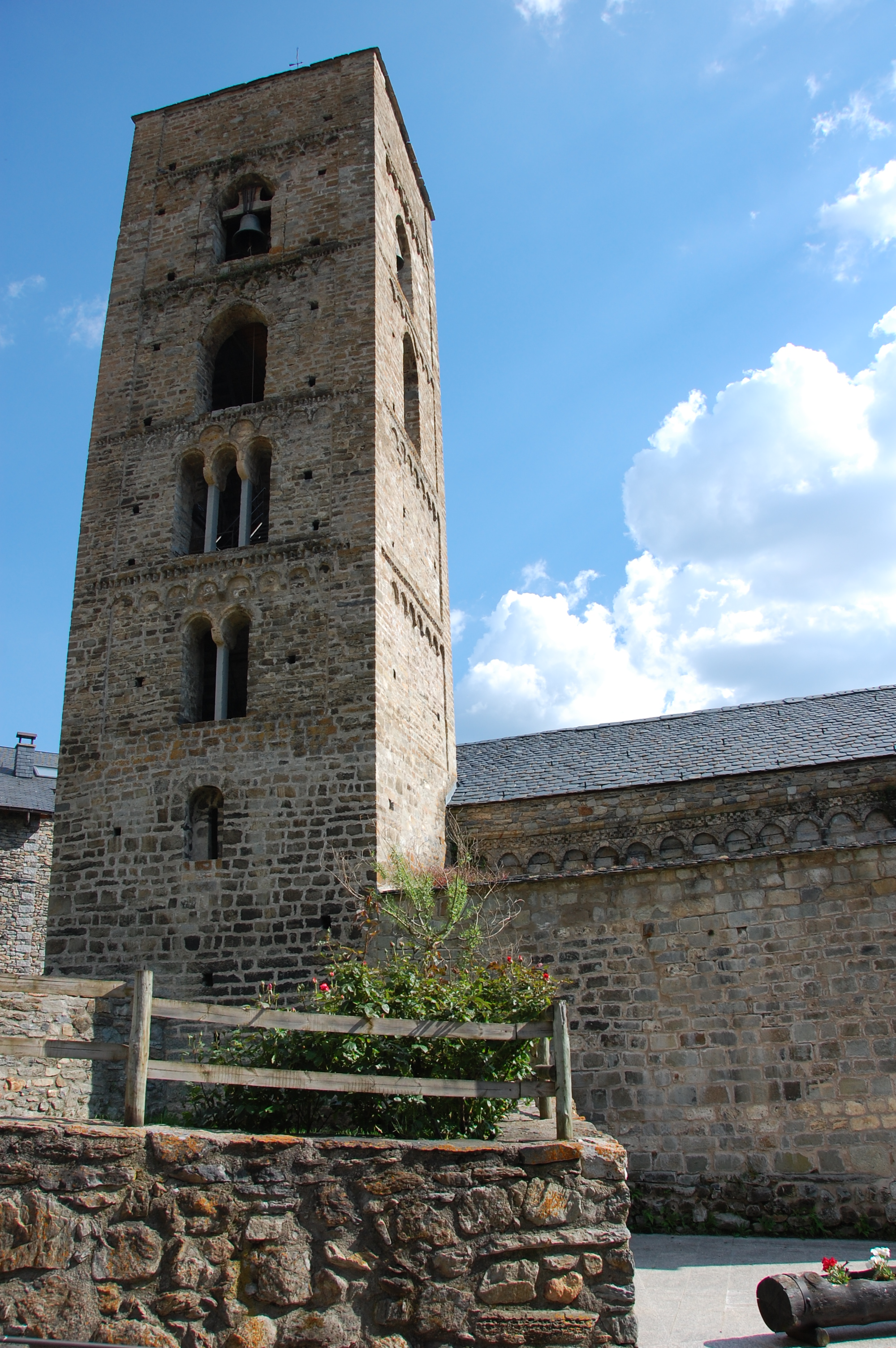
Tower, La Nativitat de Durro

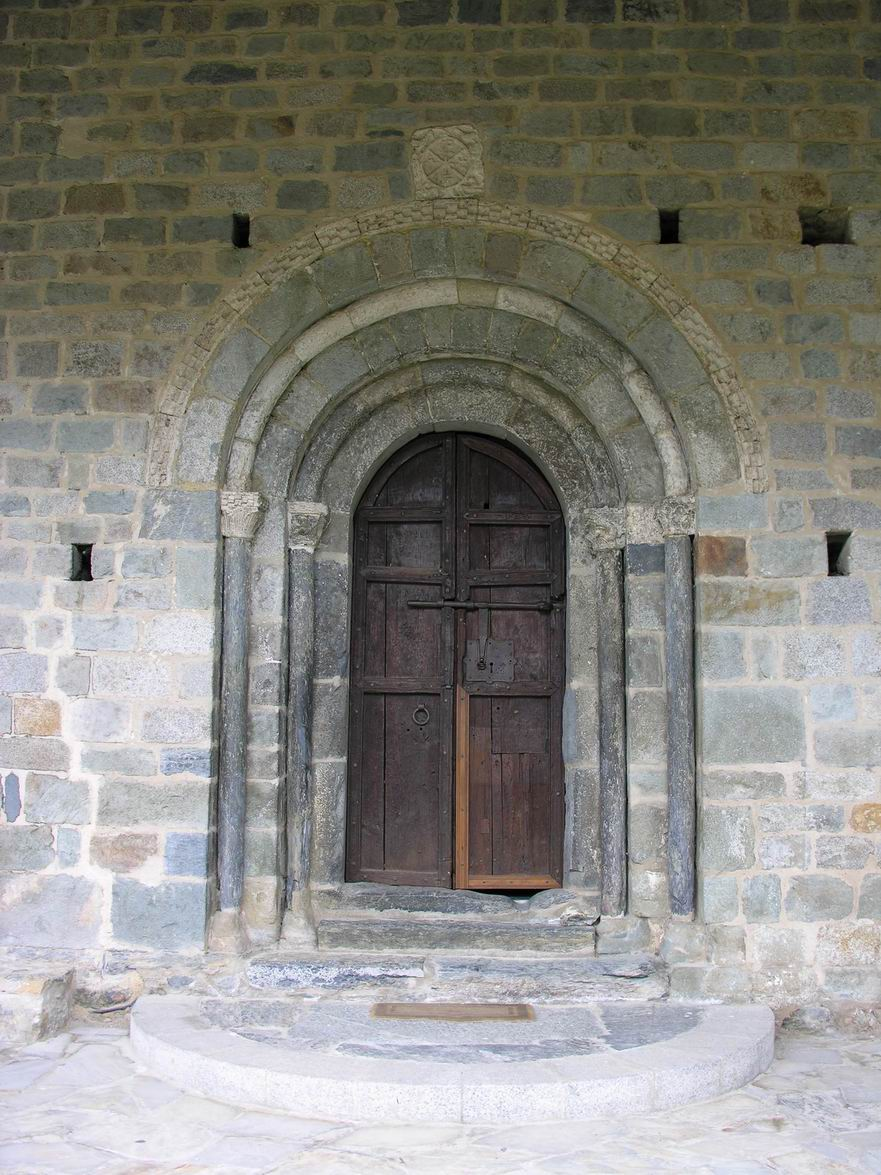
Door of La Nativitat de Durro

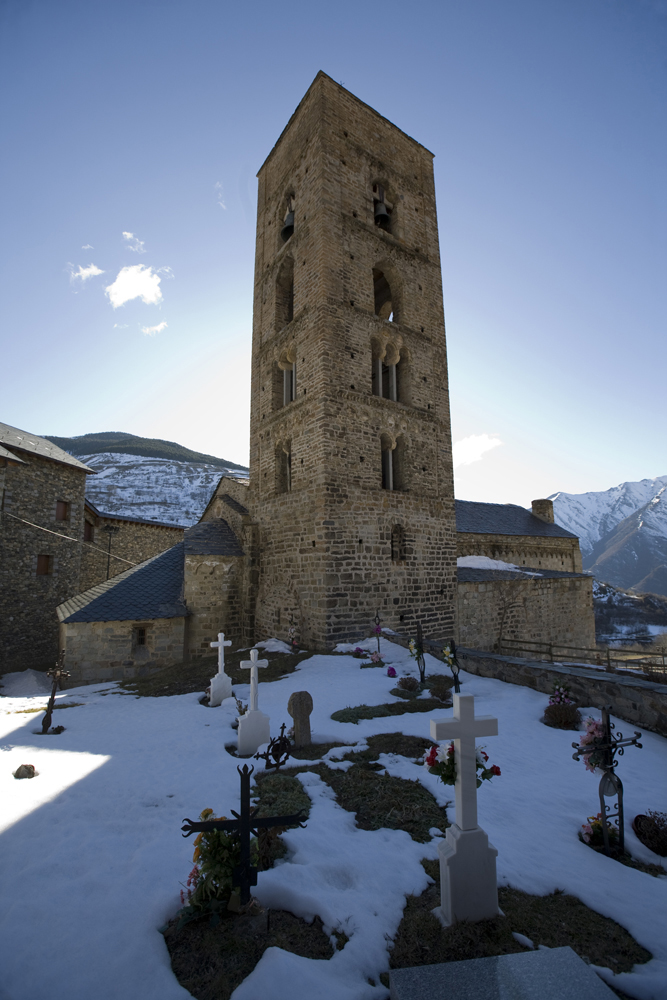
Cemetery, La Nativitat de Durro

== Interior ==
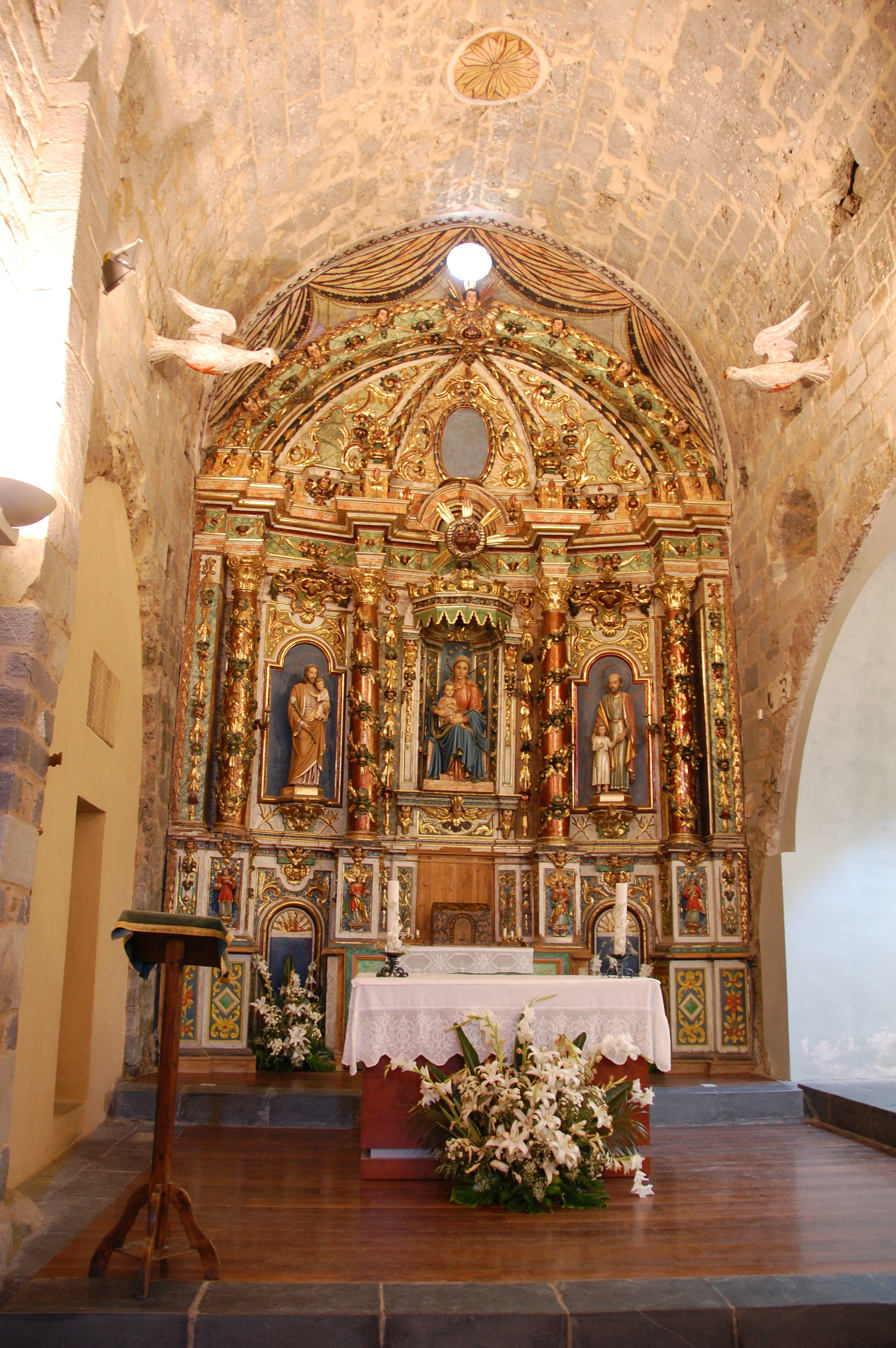
Reredos, La Nativitat de Durro

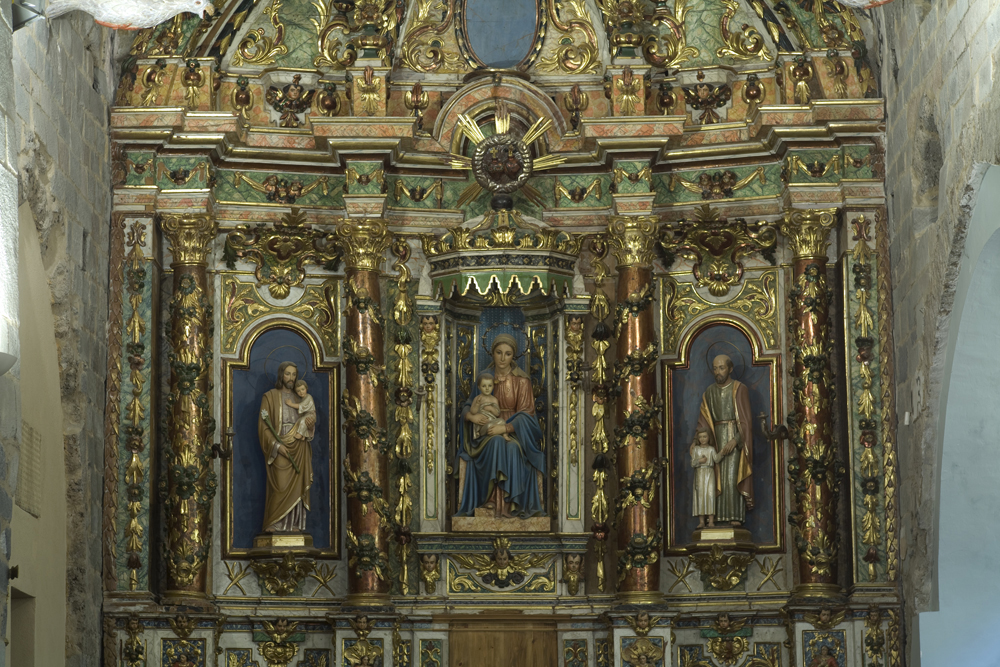
Closer view of reredos, La Nativitat de Durro

== See also ==
- Catalan Romanesque Churches of the Vall de Boí
- Vall de Boí
