= Sant Quirc de Durro =

Chapel in Durro, Spain

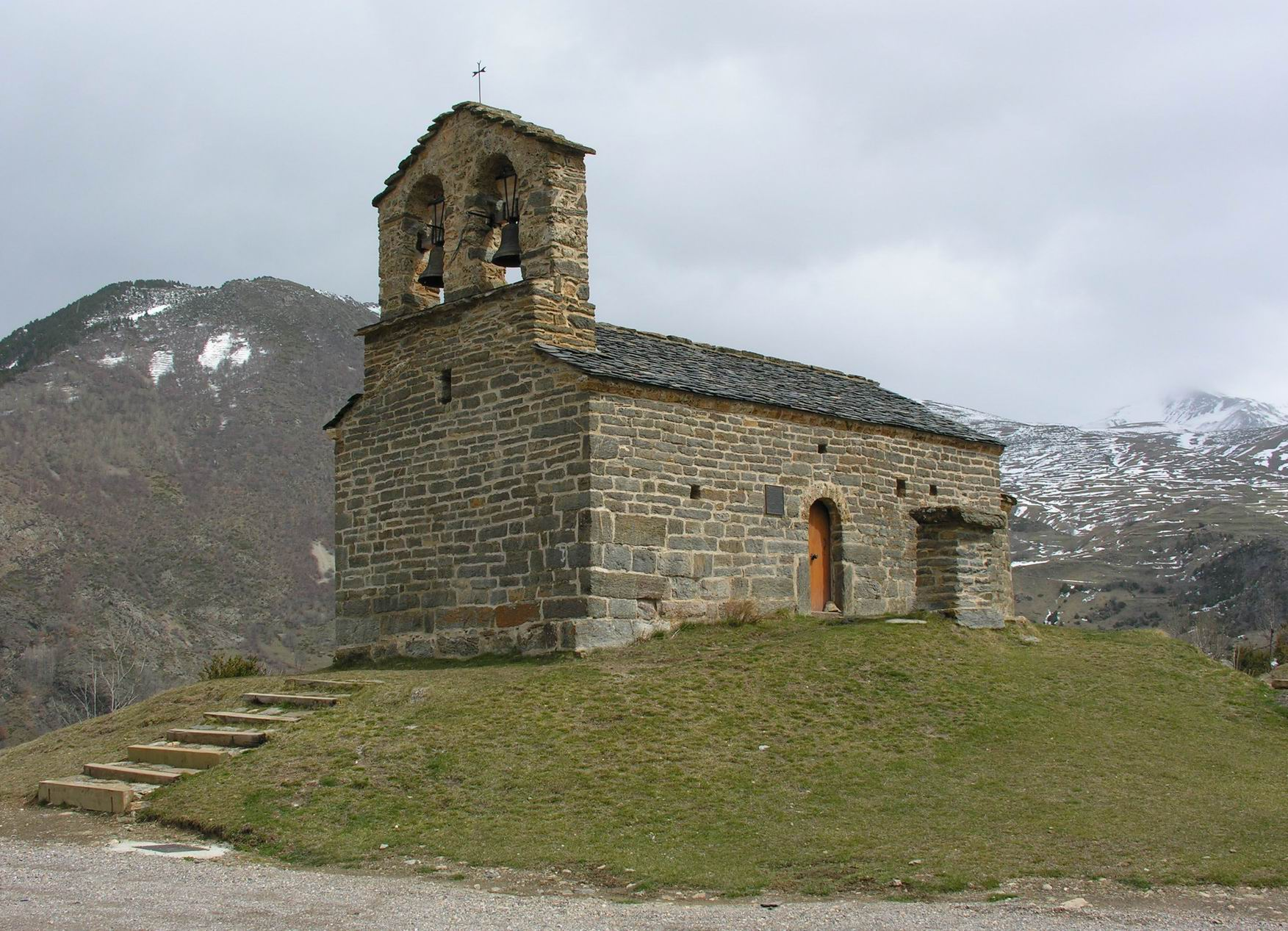

- Location within Spain

Religion
- Affiliation: Roman Catholic

Location
- Location: Durro, Catalonia, Spain
- Interactive map of Sant Quirc de Durro
- Coordinates: 42.495108°N 0.811497°E

Architecture
- Type: Chapel
- Style: Romanesque
- UNESCO World Heritage Site
- Official name: Catalan Romanesque Churches of the Vall de Boí
- Type: Cultural
- Criteria: ii, iv
- Designated: 2000 (24th session)
- Reference no.: 988
- Region: Europe and North America

Sant Quirc de Durro is an isolated chapel situated in the village of Durro, in the territory of Vall de Boí, a commune in the valley with the same name and in Comarca of Alta Ribagorça in the north of Province of Lleida and the autonomous communities of Catalonia in Spain. It is one of the best known places of Roman art in the valley and since November 2000, is part of the world heritage site of UNESCO with eight other Catalan Romanesque Churches of the Vall de Boí.

The chapel is situated at an altitude of 1498m, giving a very large panorama closed by the massifs of Comaloforno and those of Besiberri. A path allows to reach the small lake of Durro at height of 2250m. It is dedicated to Saint Cyr of Tarse, child saint, son of Saint Julietta, both of them martyred in 304. Their feast day is celebrated in their honour on June 16.

== Architecture ==
The chapel presents a plan of unique nave, barrel vault ending with a semi-circular apse vaulted in semi-dome. Masonry work can be found around the tower of nave. The building has three openings: a narrow window in arrowslit in the centre of apse, an oculus above the apse, illuminating the nave and another arrowslit on east façade.

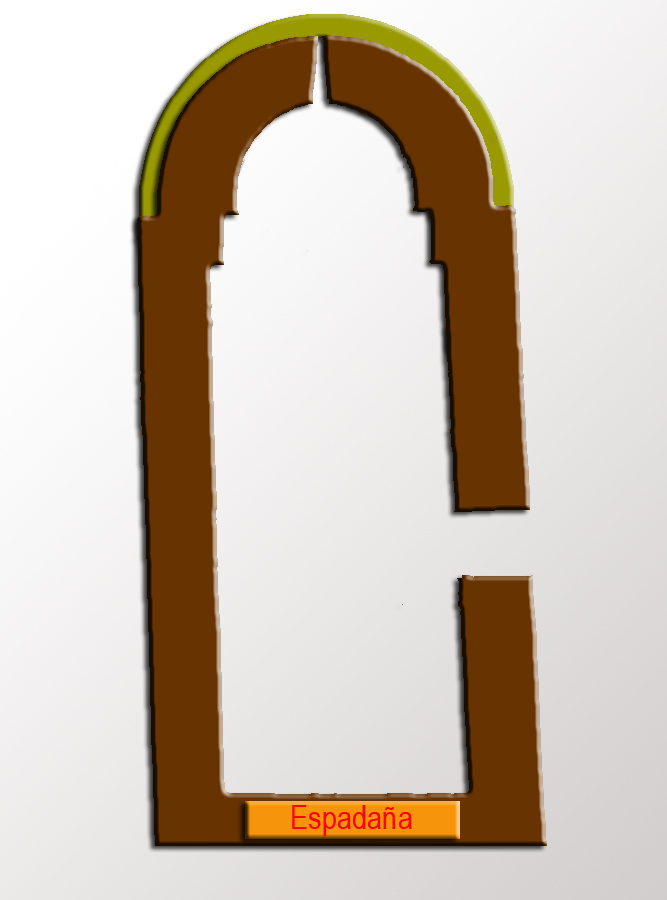
Plan of the Chapel

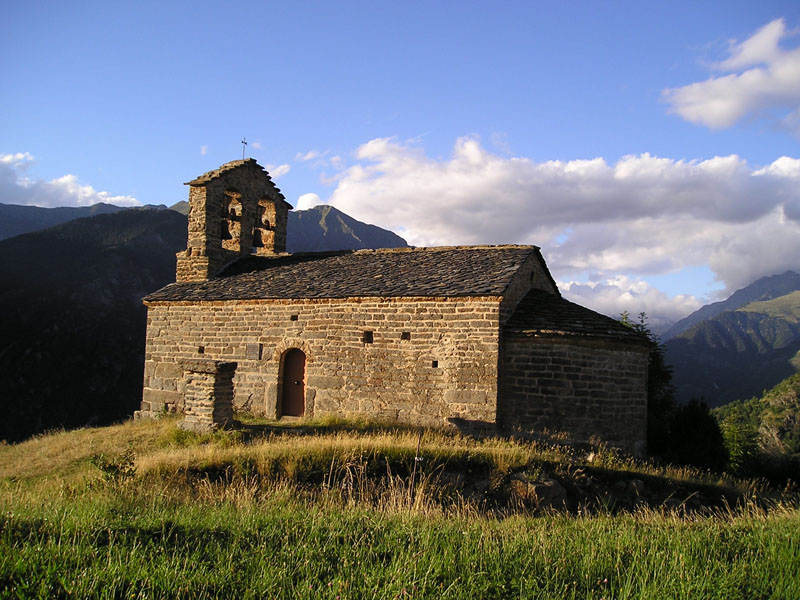
General view of the Chapel

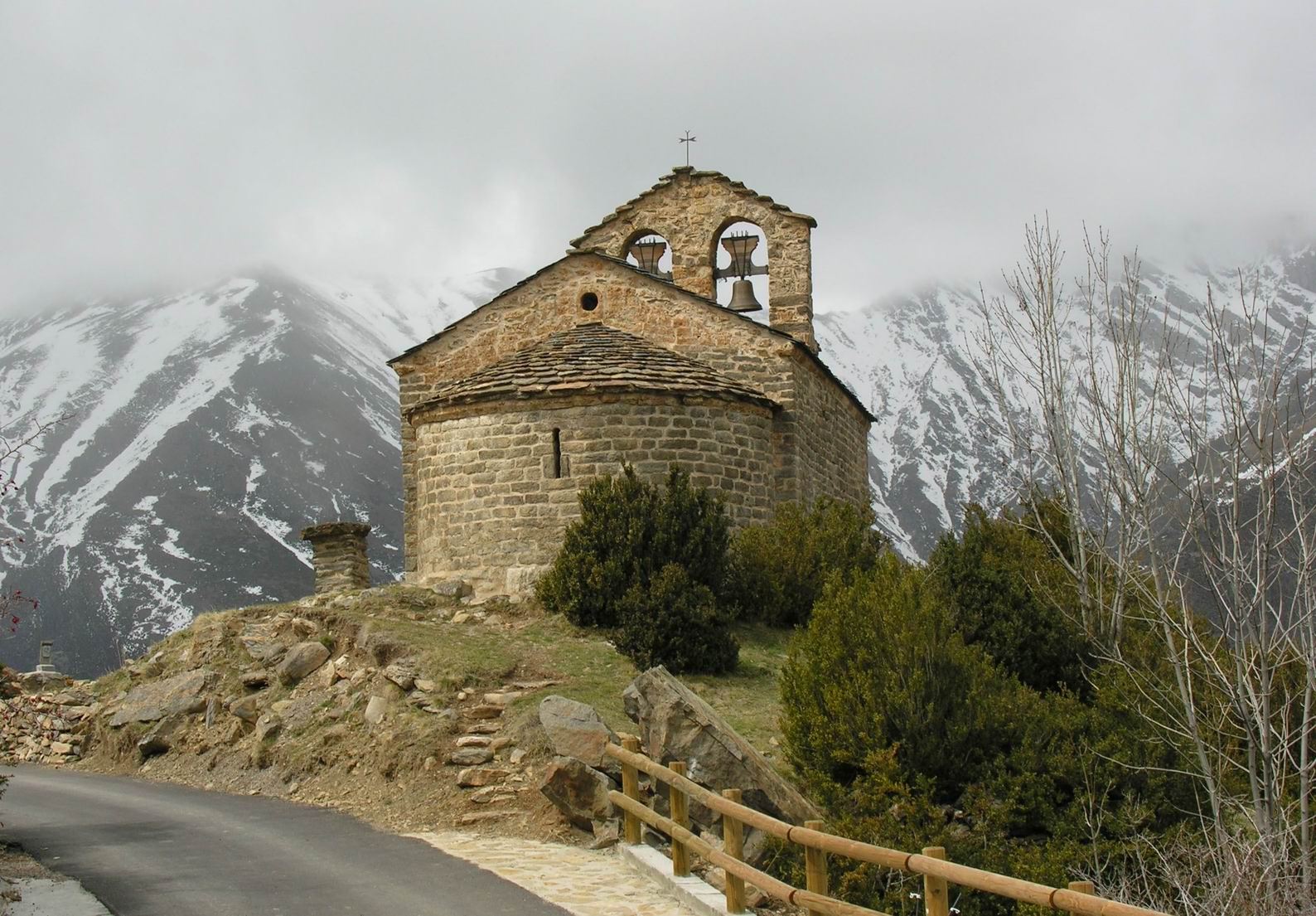
Apse

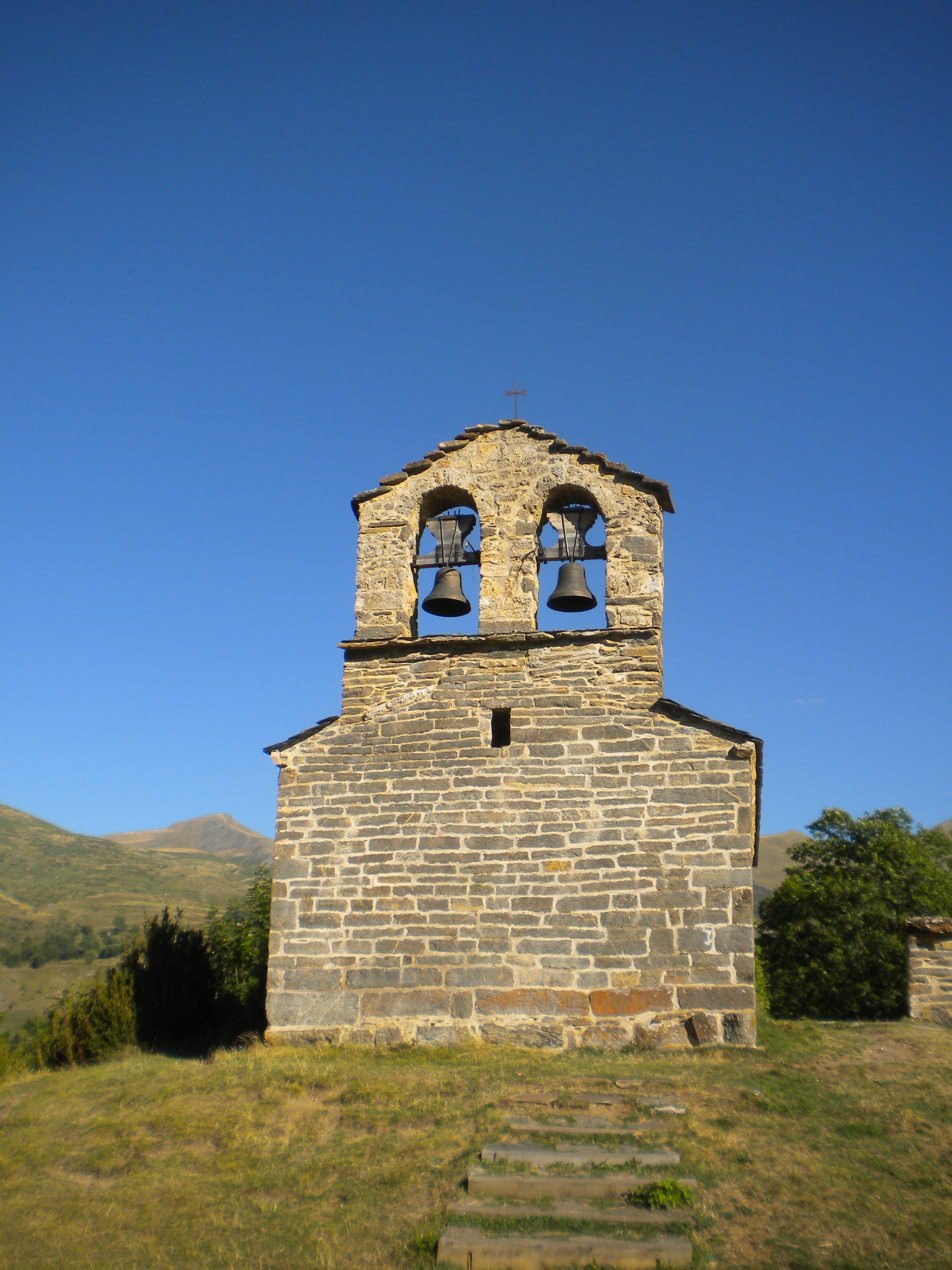
Occidental facade and wall of bell-gable

== Interior ==
In the interior of the Chapel, we find the antependium, representing the martyrdom of Saint Cyr of Tarse and of Saint Julietta, a major work of art of Catalan Romanesque painting, acquired in 1923 and exposed in Museu Nacional d'Art de Catalunya.

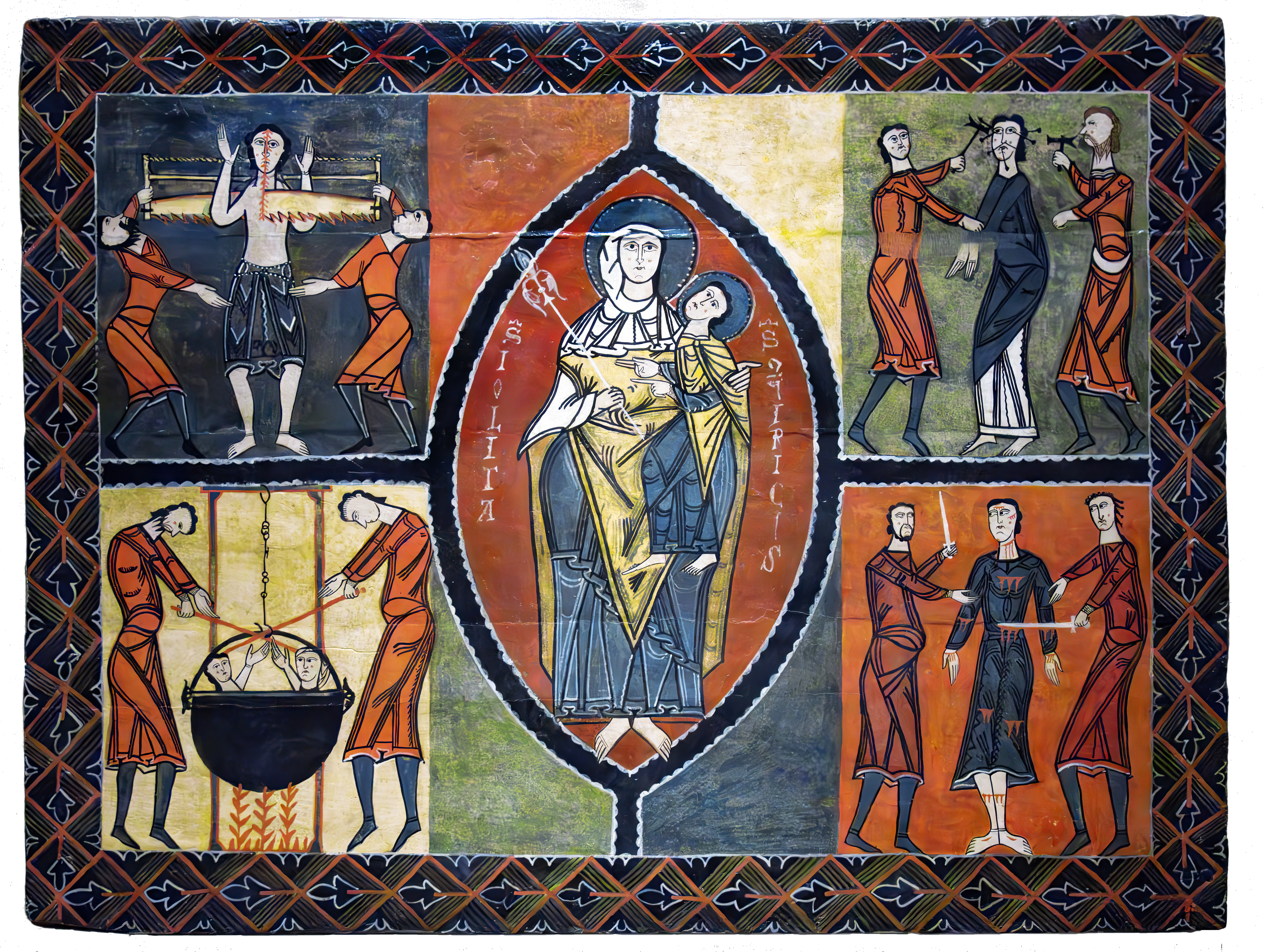
Antependium: Martyrdom of Saint Cyr and Saint Julietta

== See also ==
- Catalan Romanesque Churches of the Vall de Boí
- Vall de Boí
