= Santa Maria de Cardet =

Church building in Cardet, Spain

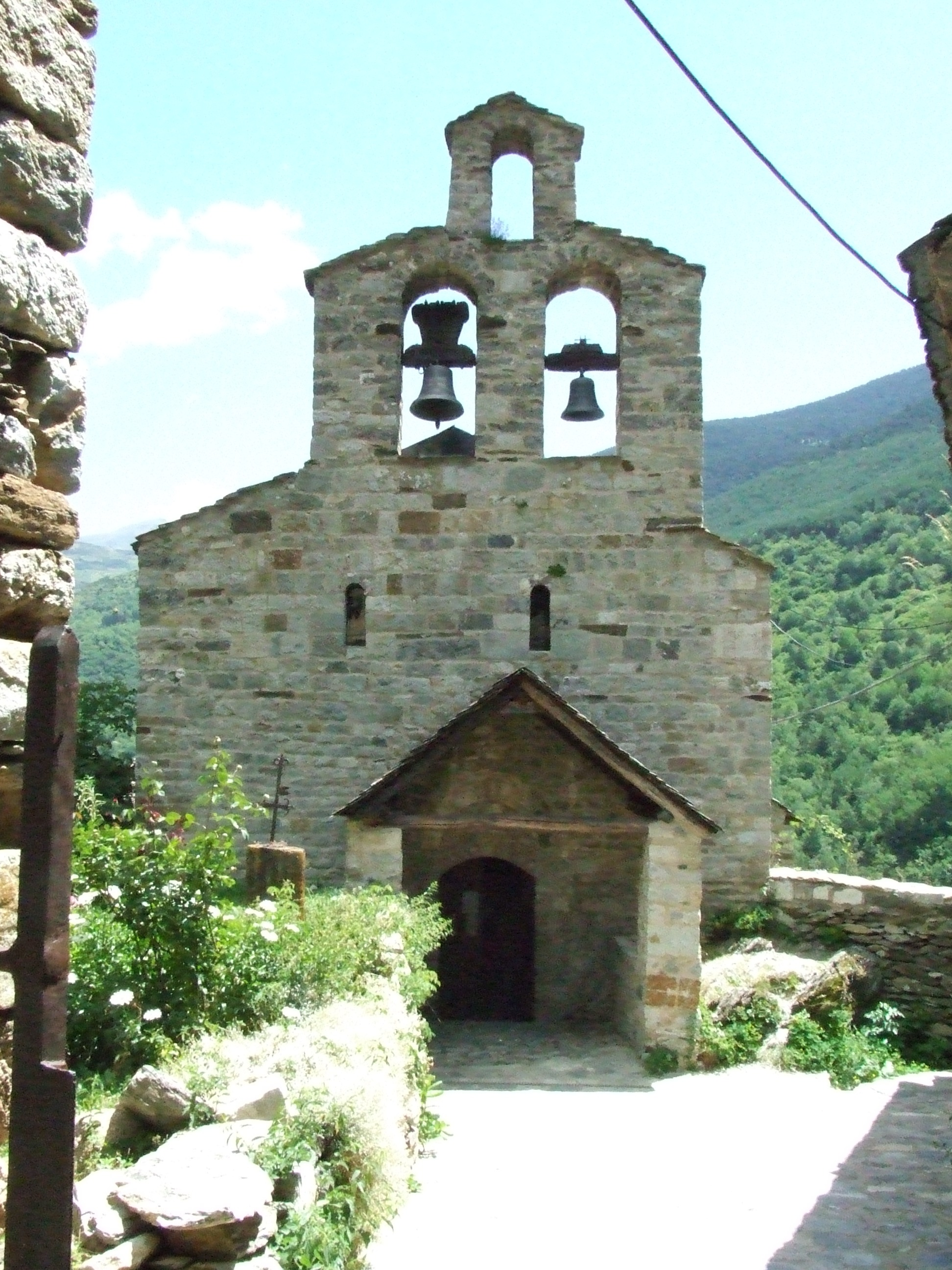

- Location within Spain

Religion
- Affiliation: Roman Catholic

Location
- Location: Cardet, Catalonia, Spain
- Interactive map of Santa Maria de Cardet
- Coordinates: 42.497889°N 0.786111°E

Architecture
- Type: Church
- Style: Romanesque
- UNESCO World Heritage Site
- Official name: Catalan Romanesque Churches of the Vall de Boí
- Type: Cultural
- Criteria: ii, iv
- Designated: 2000 (24th session)
- Reference no.: 988
- Region: Europe and North America

Santa Maria de Cardet is a church situated in Cardet, in the territory of Vall de Boí, a commune in the valley with the same name and in Comarca of Alta Ribagorça in the north of Province of Lleida and the autonomous communities of Catalonia in Spain.

It is part of the world heritage site of UNESCO with eight other Catalan Romanesque Churches of the Vall de Boí.

== Architecture ==
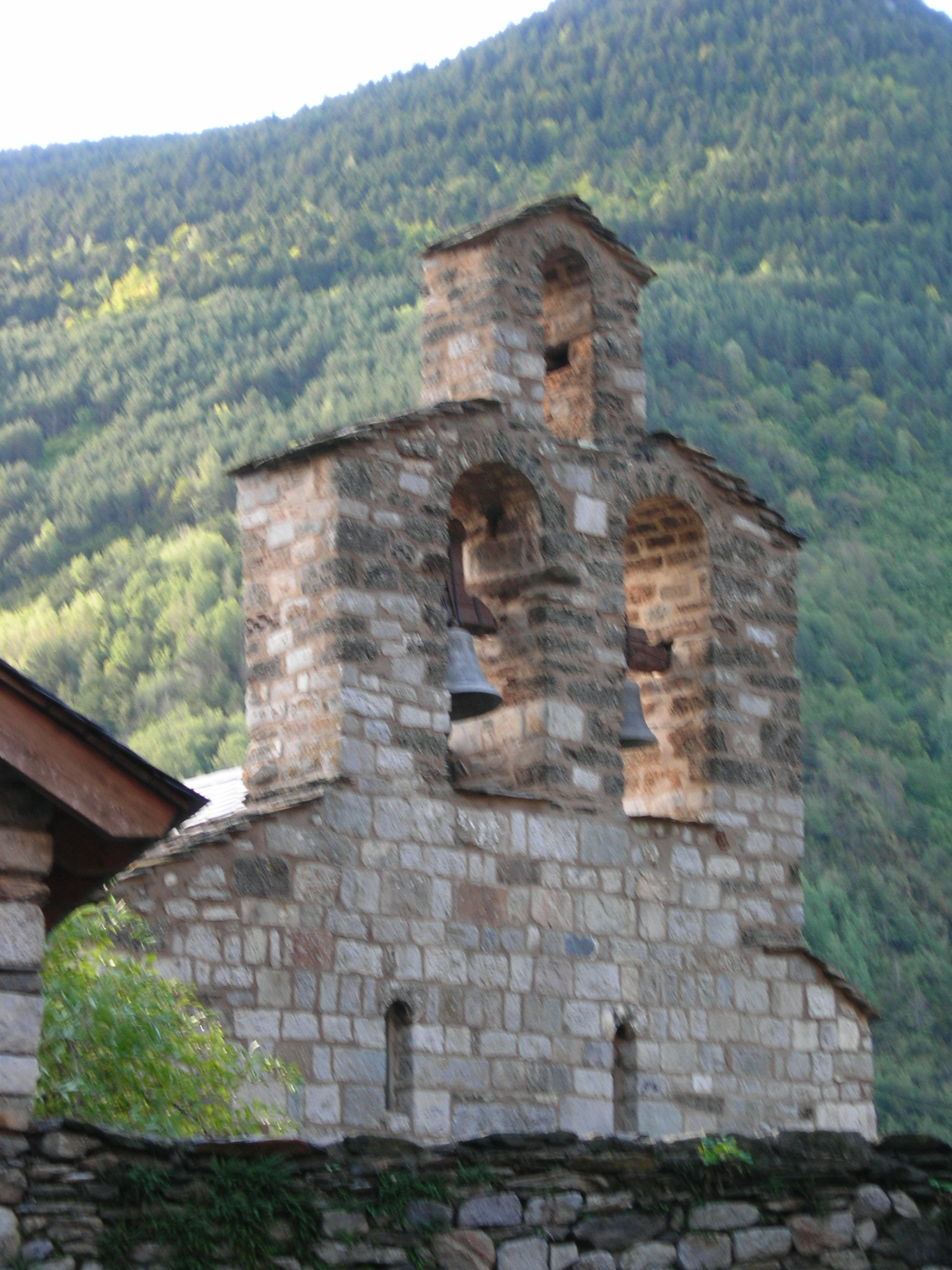
Wall of bell-gable, Santa Maria de Cardet

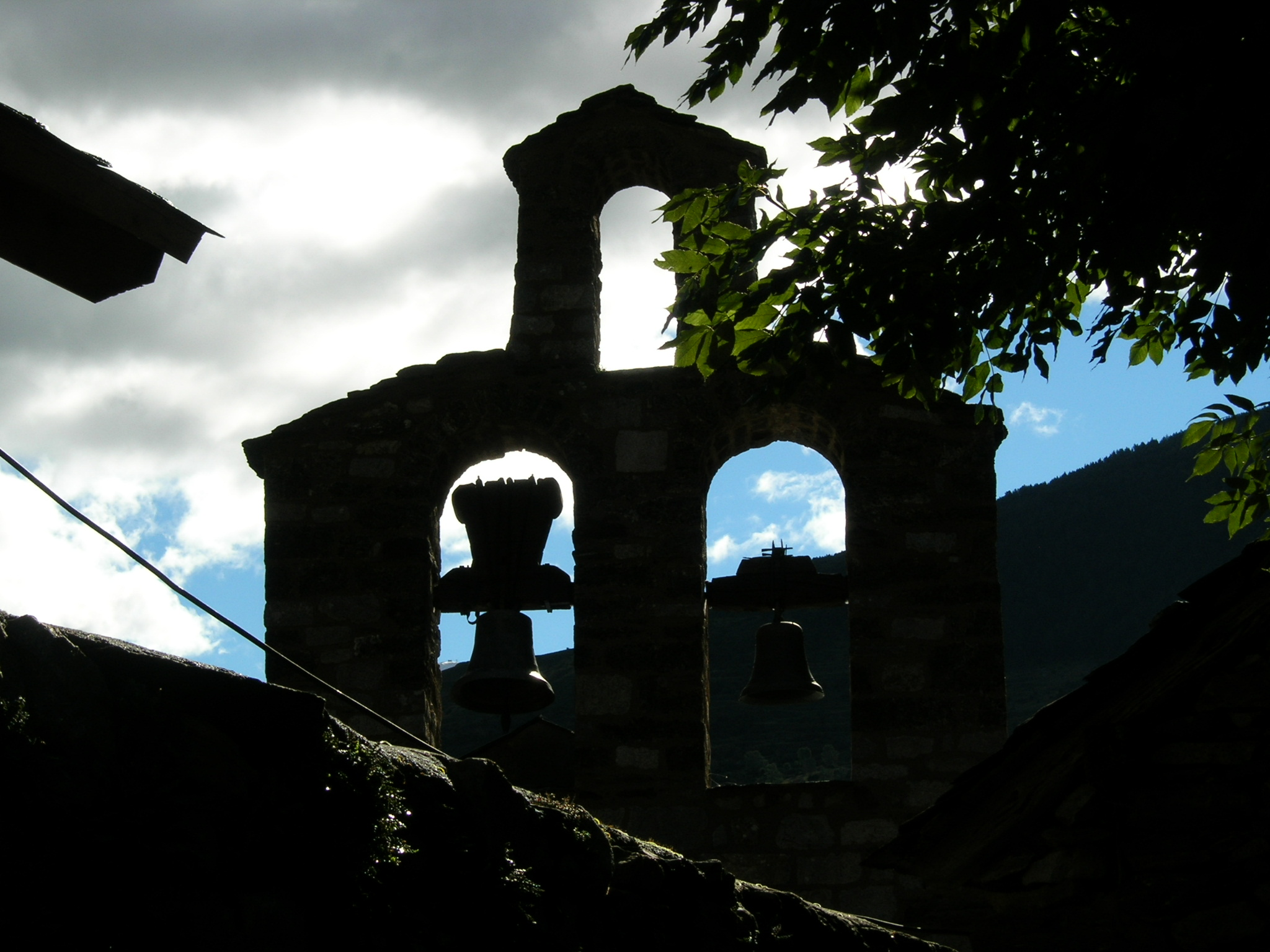
Bell-gable, Santa Maria de Cardet

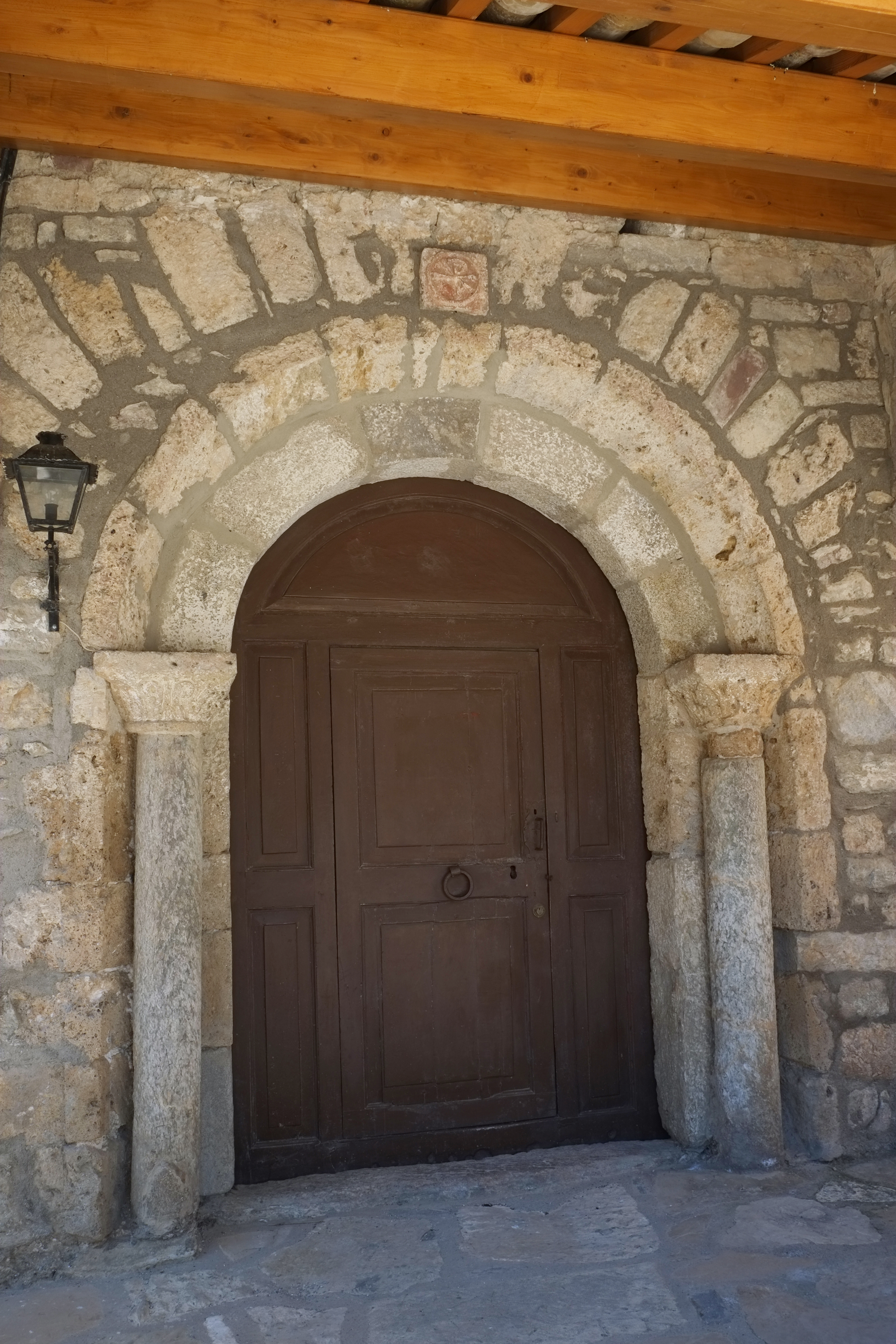
Door, Santa Maria de Cardet

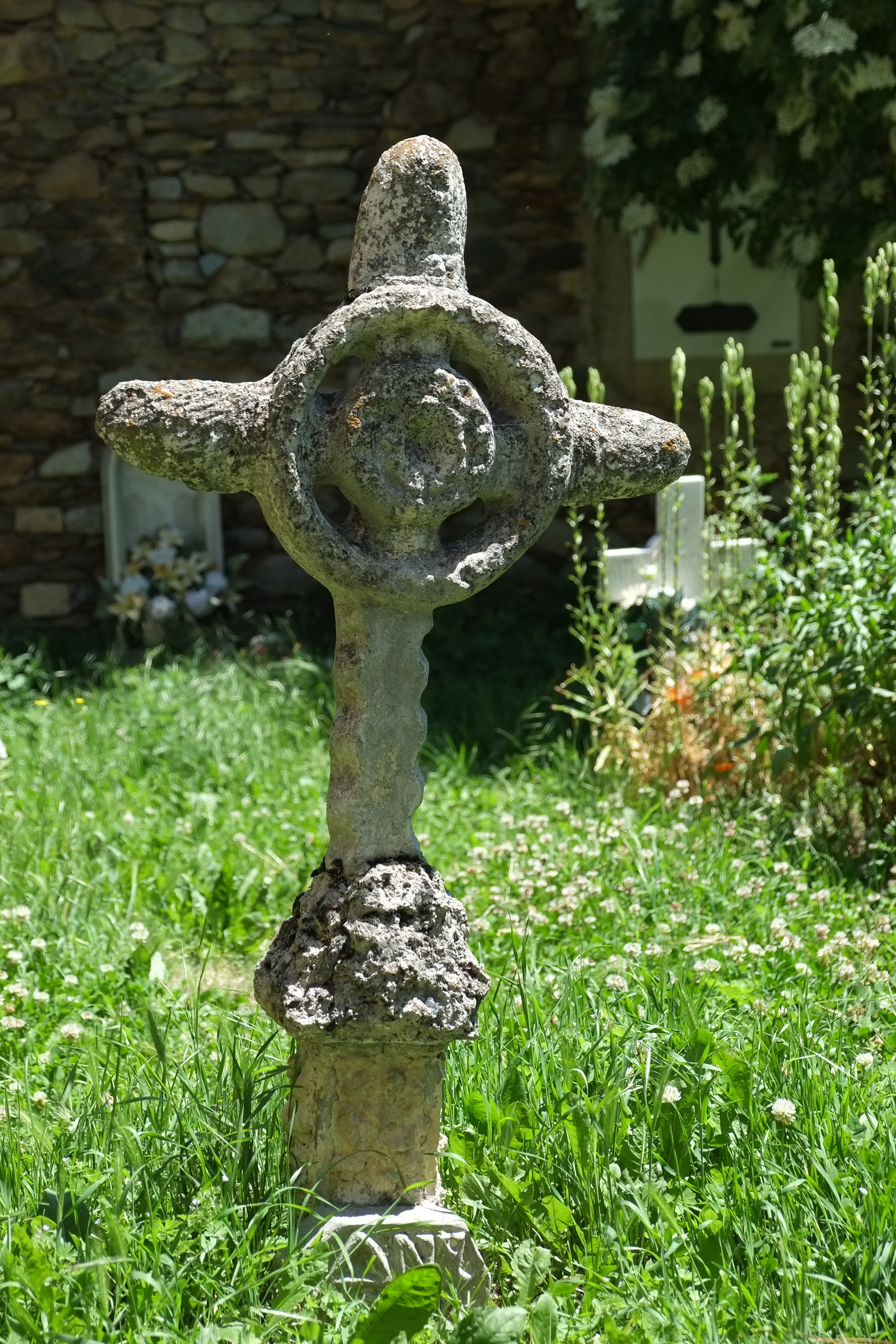
Cross in the cemetery, Santa Maria de Cardet

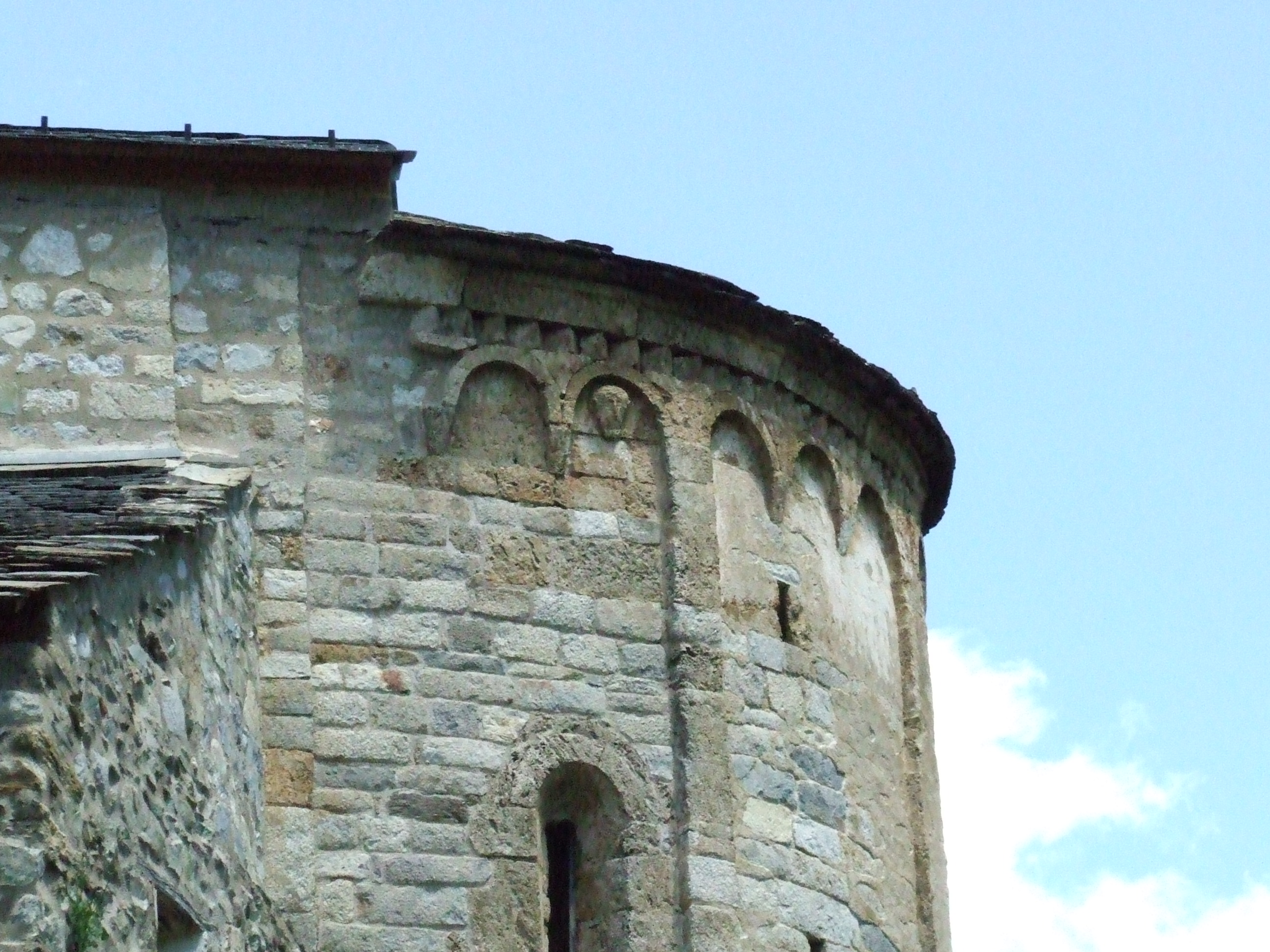
Apse, Santa Maria de Cardet

== Interior ==
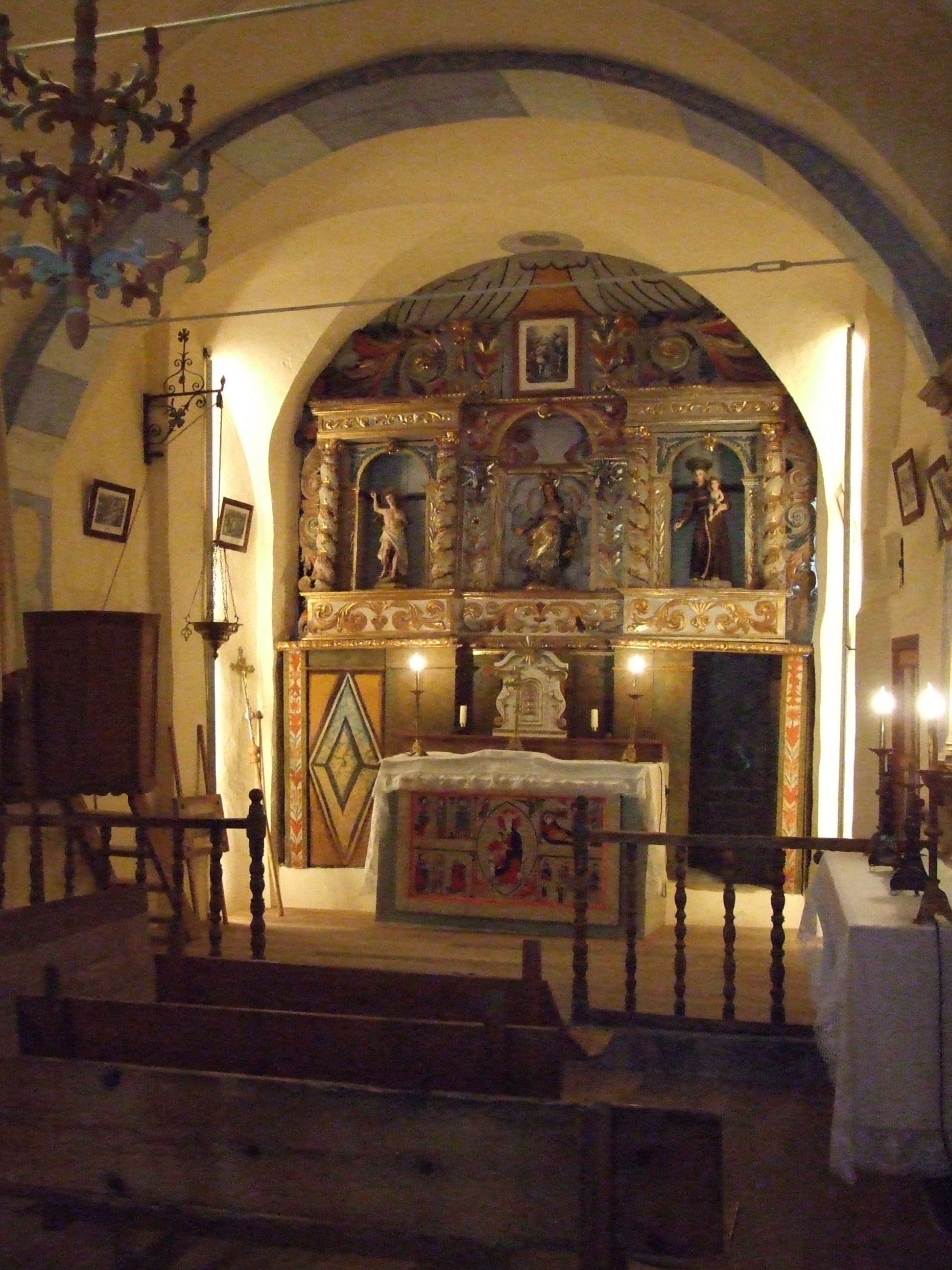
Reredos, Santa Maria de Cardet

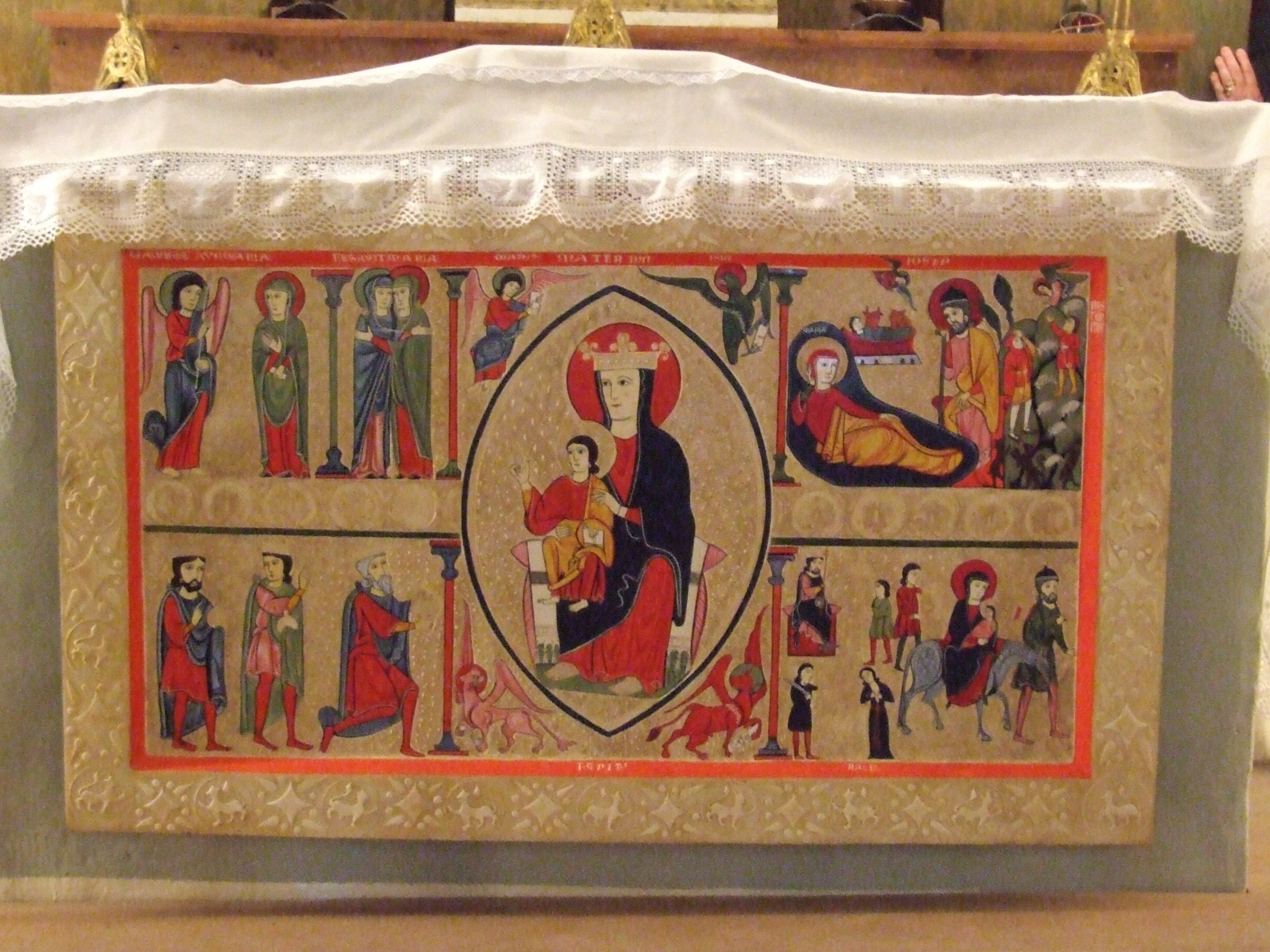
Antependium, Santa Maria de Cardet

== See also ==
- Catalan Romanesque Churches of the Vall de Boí
- Vall de Boí
