= Catalan Romanesque Churches of the Vall de Boí =

UNESCO World Heritage Site
- Location within Catalonia Location within Spain
- Location: Vall de Boí, Alta Ribagorça, Province of Lleida, Catalonia, Spain
- Includes: 1. Església de Sant Feliu; 2. Església de Sant Joan de Boí; 3. Església de Santa Maria (Taüll); 4. Església de Sant Climent; 5. Església de Santa Maria de l'Assumpció; 6. Església de Santa Maria (Cardet); 7. Església de la Nativitat; 8. Ermitage de Sant Quirc; 9. Església de Santa Eulàlia
- Criteria: Cultural: (ii), (iv)
- Reference: 988
- Inscription: 2000 (24th Session)
- Area: 7.98 ha (19.7 acres)
- Buffer zone: 3,562 ha (8,800 acres)
- Coordinates: 42°30′17″N 0°48′13″E

The Churches of the Vall de Boí are a set of nine Early Romanesque churches declared World Heritage Site by UNESCO and located in the Vall de Boí, in the Catalan comarca of Alta Ribagorça (Province of Lleida).

Built between the 11th and 12th centuries, as a group, these churches represent an especially pure and consistent example of pictorial art and architecture in the Lombard Romanesque style and were unusual for the richness of their interior paintings. They are the largest concentration in Europe of Romanesque art and a unique example of 12th century Catalonian cultural traditions.

In the early 20th century, a major effort to study the interior pictorial decoration was undertaken, resulting in their protection in law and their removal to the National Museum of Catalan Art (MNAC) in Barcelona and replacing them with in-situ reproductions.

== History of the frescoes of the Vall de Boí ==
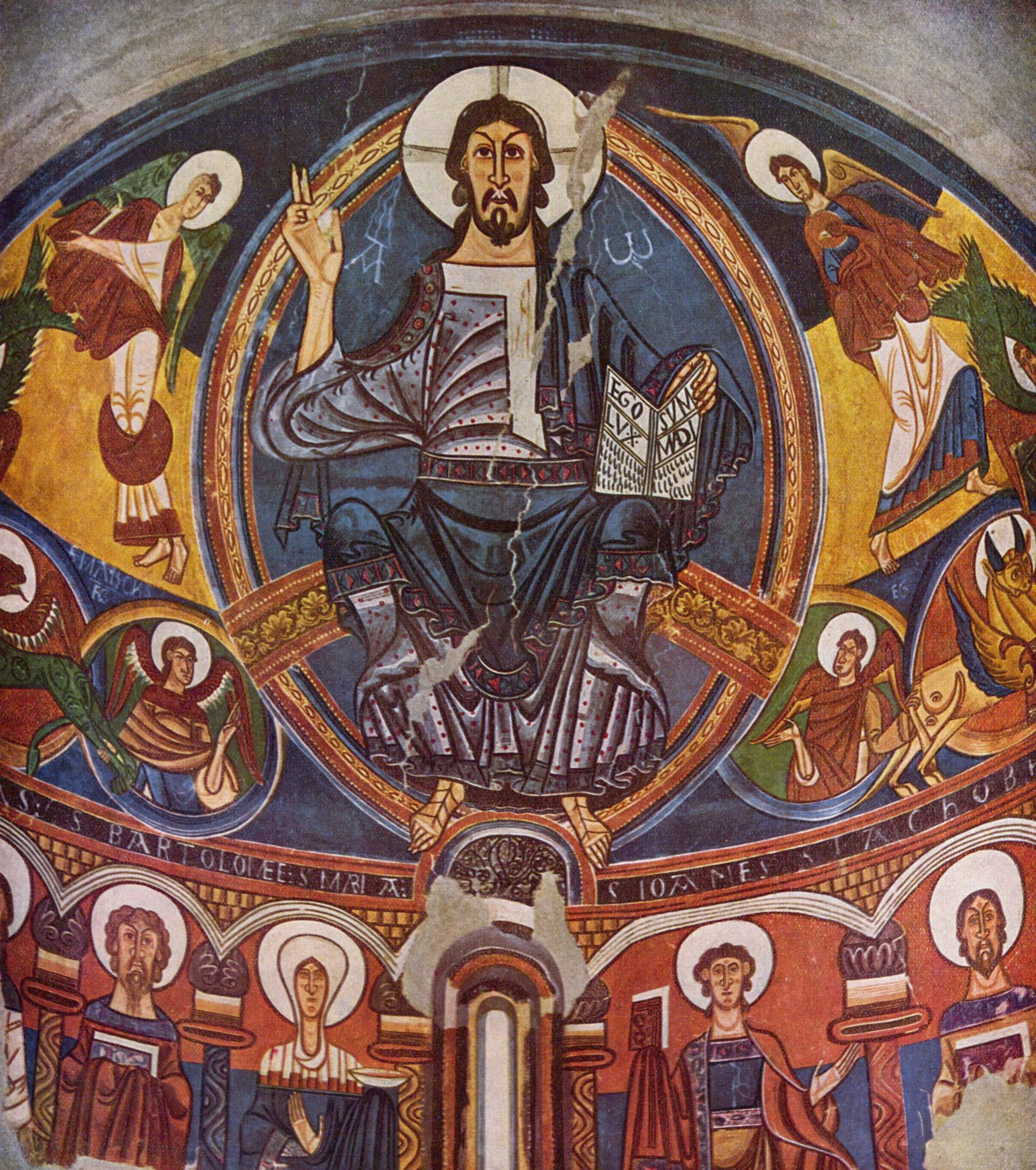
Fresco of Christ Pantocrator from Sant Climent de Taüll, acknowledged as one of the masterpieces of Romanesque art

The twelfth century was the golden age for fresco painting throughout Catalonia; the rise of military orders and victories against the Moors led to increased wealth.

The churches in the Vall de Boí were built in two stages: those of Boí around 1100 and in style are connected to Aquitaine. The second stage, the churches of Taüll, date from 1123 that reflect a Lombard style mixed with the sculpture from Toulouse. The apse of Sant Climent de Taüll is considered a masterpiece of European Romanesque painting.

During the early 20th century there was a major effort to study and catalog and eventually to purchase, remove and transfer the Romanesque wall paintings in the churches of the Vall de Boí area. This activity was driven by both the academic interests of scholars, and by art dealers.

In 1904 and 1906, the Hiking Club of Catalonia organised the first trips to inter-alia the Vall de Boí, with the aim of collecting plans, photographs and taking notes. Subsequently, in June 1907 an expedition by the Institute for Catalan Studies undertook to study, document and photograph culturally important buildings and art works the Vall d'Aran and Alta Ribagorça which included the Vall de Boí. As a result, between 1905 and 1909 the Board of the Museums of Barcelona printed faithful reproductions of these Pyrenean frescoes, and the publication of these works unleashed a desire for their acquisition by museums and private collectors.

By 1919, many intermediaries were involved in buying and selling these works, which went mostly to museums and private collections within the United States. In one documented case, Italian and Polish craftsmen were paid by unscrupulous Barcelona industrialist and art collector Lluis Planidura to remove frescoes in isolated churches and sold the apse of the church of Santa Maria de Mur to the Boston Museum of Fine Arts in 1921 (entirely legally) before an outcry by Spanish artists and curators had him stopped.

The Taüll region became an exception to this trend, since the local population refused to allow the frescoes and other art works to leave their churches. This action was escalated to the level of the Commonwealth of Catalonia and to the bishop of La Seu d'Urgell. Finally, it was agreed that the frescoes would be best kept in the National Museum of Catalan Art (MNAC), secure from possible theft or unscrupulous transactions. A team of Italian restorers carried out the task of removing the paintings from the walls and, in some cases, replacing the works with in situ reproductions.

The Taüll Romanesque paintings preserved in MNAC have since become world-famous. Interest by art academics and professionals has led to a systematic study of all other remaining Romanesque murals of the Vall de Boí area, and most of these are now in safe protection at MNAC in Barcelona and at the Museum of Vic.

== World Heritage Site ==
UNESCO declared World Heritage Sites in 2000 to nine churches:

Code	Name	Place	Coordinates
988–001	Sant Feliu de Barruera	Barruera	42°30′17.2″N 0°48′13.1″E
988–002	Sant Joan de Boí	Boí	42°31′41.7″N 0°50′01.0″E
988–003	Santa Maria de Taüll	Taüll	42°31′01.4″N 0°51′03.4″E
988–004	Sant Climent de Taüll	Taüll	42°30′59.6″N 0°50′59.4″E
988–005	Santa Maria de Cóll	Cóll	42°26′35.3″N 0°44′43.9″E
988–006	Santa Maria de Cardet	Cardet	42°29′03.8″N 0°46′36.3″E
988–007	La Nativitat de Durro	Durro	42°30′09.9″N 0°49′19.1″E
988–008	Sant Quirc de Durro	Durro	42°30′08.6″N 0°49′25.3″E
988–009	Santa Eulàlia d'Erill la Vall	Erill la Vall	42°31′49.6″N 0°49′55.8″E

=== Sant Climent, Taüll ===
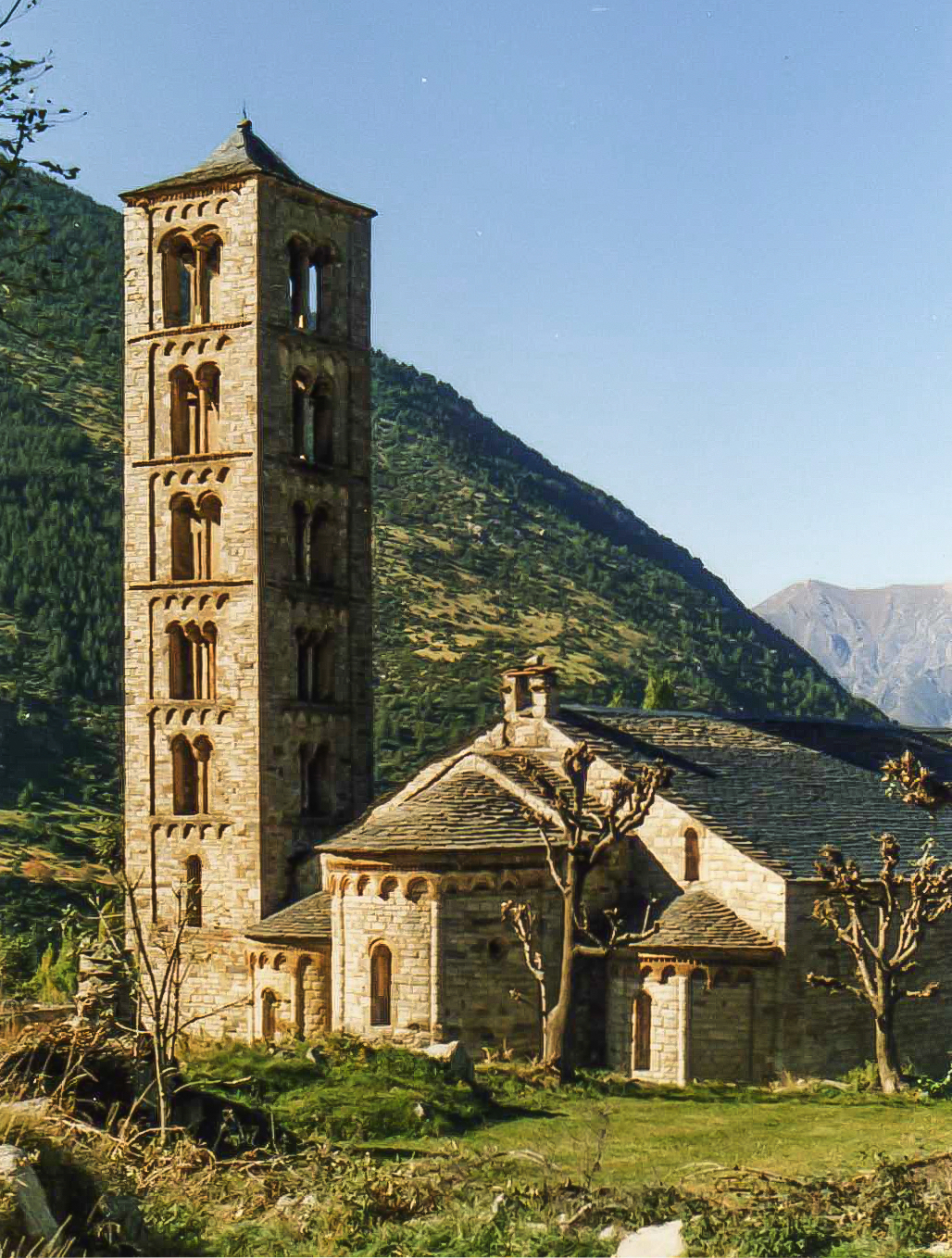
Sant Climent, Taüll.

The church of Sant Climent de Taüll, consecrated on 10 December 1123 by the bishop of Roda, is the largest, best preserved, and most outstanding architecturally of the churches in the Vall de Boí. It is the symbol of Catalan Romanesque architecture due to its interior decoration and characteristic Lombard Romanesque architecture.

This church is basilican in plan with three naves separated by cylindrical columns, topped by three semicircular apses. The roof, of two sheds, is built of wood. Next to the building stands a six-story bell tower which despite being attached to the building, is not an integral part thereof.

The main entrance is located on the south facade and is arched. Inside the church there were many frescoes by an unknown painter called the Master of Taüll. The Pantocrator in the apse of the church, now preserved in the Museu Nacional d'Art de Catalunya (MNAC), is considered one of the best examples of Romanesque art in Europe.

== Santa Maria, Taüll ==
Santa Maria was also consecrated in 1123 and was the parish church of the municipality of Taüll during the 18th century. Its structure is very similar to that of Sant Climent. The basilica floor plan, consists of three naves and three apses. The bell tower is in the center of the nave. Many of the churches frescoes were studied in 1907 by Josep Puig i Cadafalch. The highlight is the fresco representing Saint Mary with her child on her lap, which is now in the MNAC.

=== Sant Joan de Boí ===
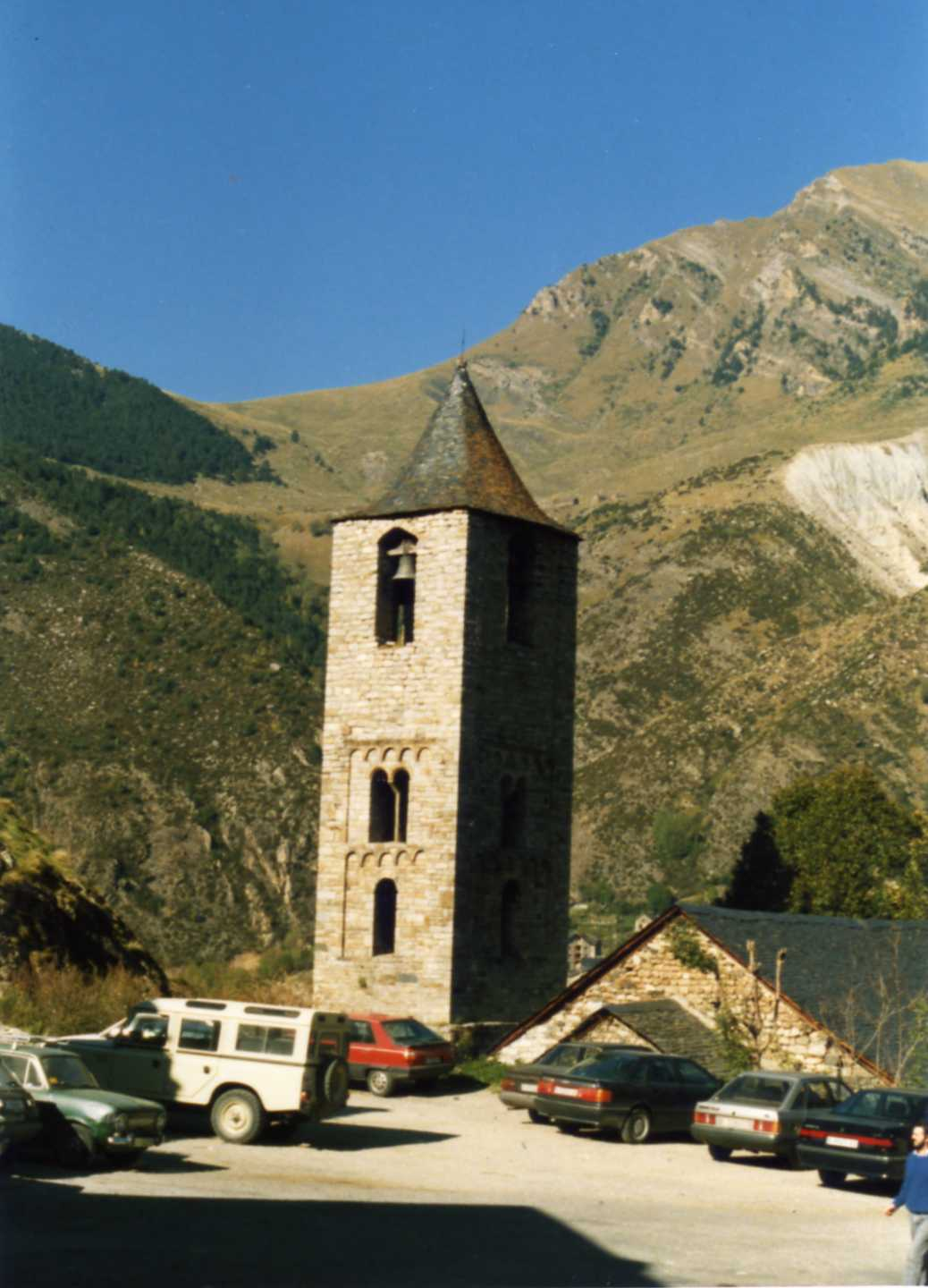
Bell tower of Sant Joan de Boí.

Sant Joan is also a church with three naves. Originally, the roof was made of wood but later was changed to a stone hedge. The bell tower, of clear-Lombard style, is attached to the lateral nave located in the south. Only two of its original stories are preserved, as the last level of the bell tower was added later. Only the apse of the church is preserved. It also has a notable collection of paintings from the 12th century among the highlights of which are those representing various mythical animals. The originals, the Paintings from Sant Joan in Boí, are in the MNAC while reproductions can be seen in the church.

=== Santa Eulàlia d'Erill la Vall ===
Santa Eulàl was declared a Spanish Monument of historical and cultural interest in 1962. The building is a single nave with a semicircular apse. The outer side has a portico decorated with cylindrical columns. The bell tower, typical example of Lombard architecture of the Vall de Boí, is of six stories, with a total height of 23 meters. It is decorated with double windows that frame the arches. In the sacristy was found a 12th-century sculptural group known as El Davallament. The sculpture is preserved separately: one part is at the MNAC and one in the Episcopal Museum of Vic.

=== Sant Feliu, Barruera ===
Sant Feliu first appears documented in the late 13th century but little is known of its history. Located in the municipality of Barruera, it has a single nave with a barrel vault. The nave is headed by a semicircular apse.

=== La Nativitat, Durro ===
Situated at an altitude of 1,386 meters, in the small town of Durrës, the church is documented for the first time in the 11th century when it belonged to the County of Pallars. Its style and characteristics are very similar to those already mentioned. It has a single nave and a single apse and five-story bell tower has very few openings.

=== Sant Quirc, Durro ===
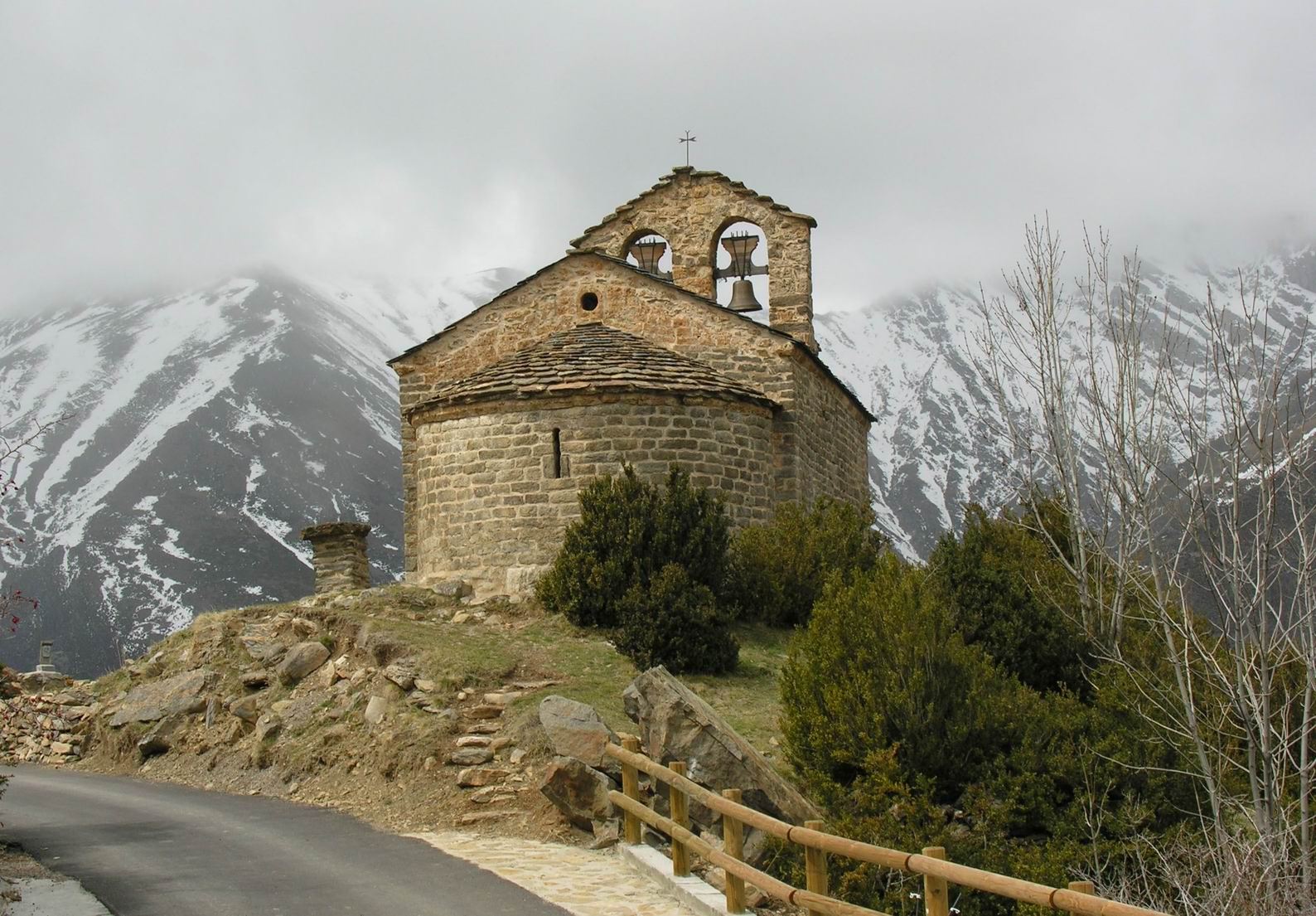
Sant Quirc de Durro.

Sant Quirc is a small hermitage of simple architecture. The nave is covered with barrel vault and finished in a presbytery, slightly higher than the rest of the nave. The entrance door is arched with voussoirs. The hermitage is very dimly lit and only has a porthole in its head and small openings on the west facade.

=== Santa Maria, Cardet ===
This is a church of small dimensions of a single nave covered with four sections of a grain vault. Being situated on a slope, the apse, of two floors, is at a higher level than the central nave. In the basement of the apse is a crypt.

=== Santa Maria, Cóll ===
Also known as the church of the Assumption, Santa Maria has a single nave with barrel vault. The bell tower is square and consists of two floors: the first consists of pointed windows while in the second hold the bells. Believed to be built during the second third of the 13th century.

== Gallery ==
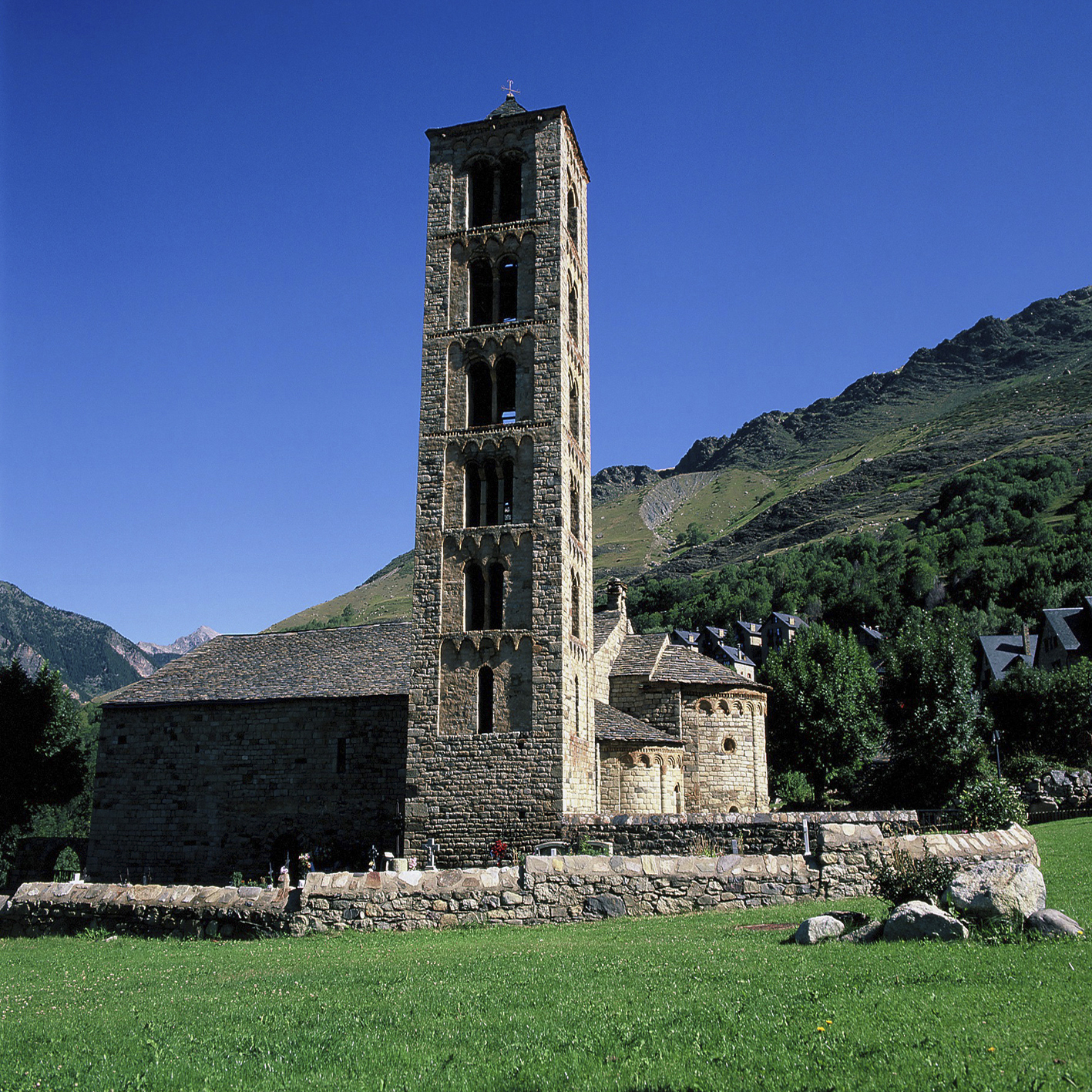
Sant Climent, Taüll

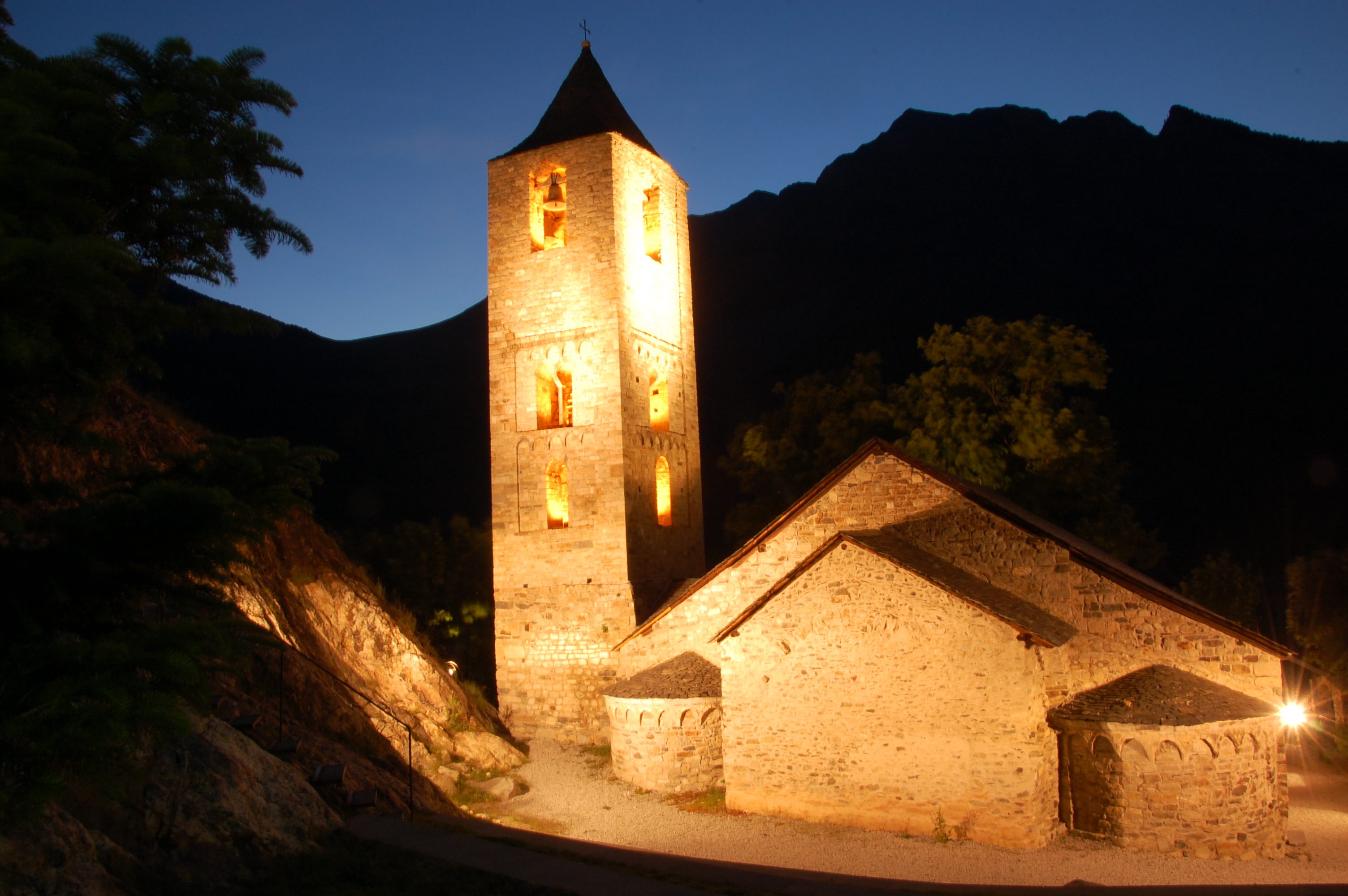
Night view, Sant Joan de Boí

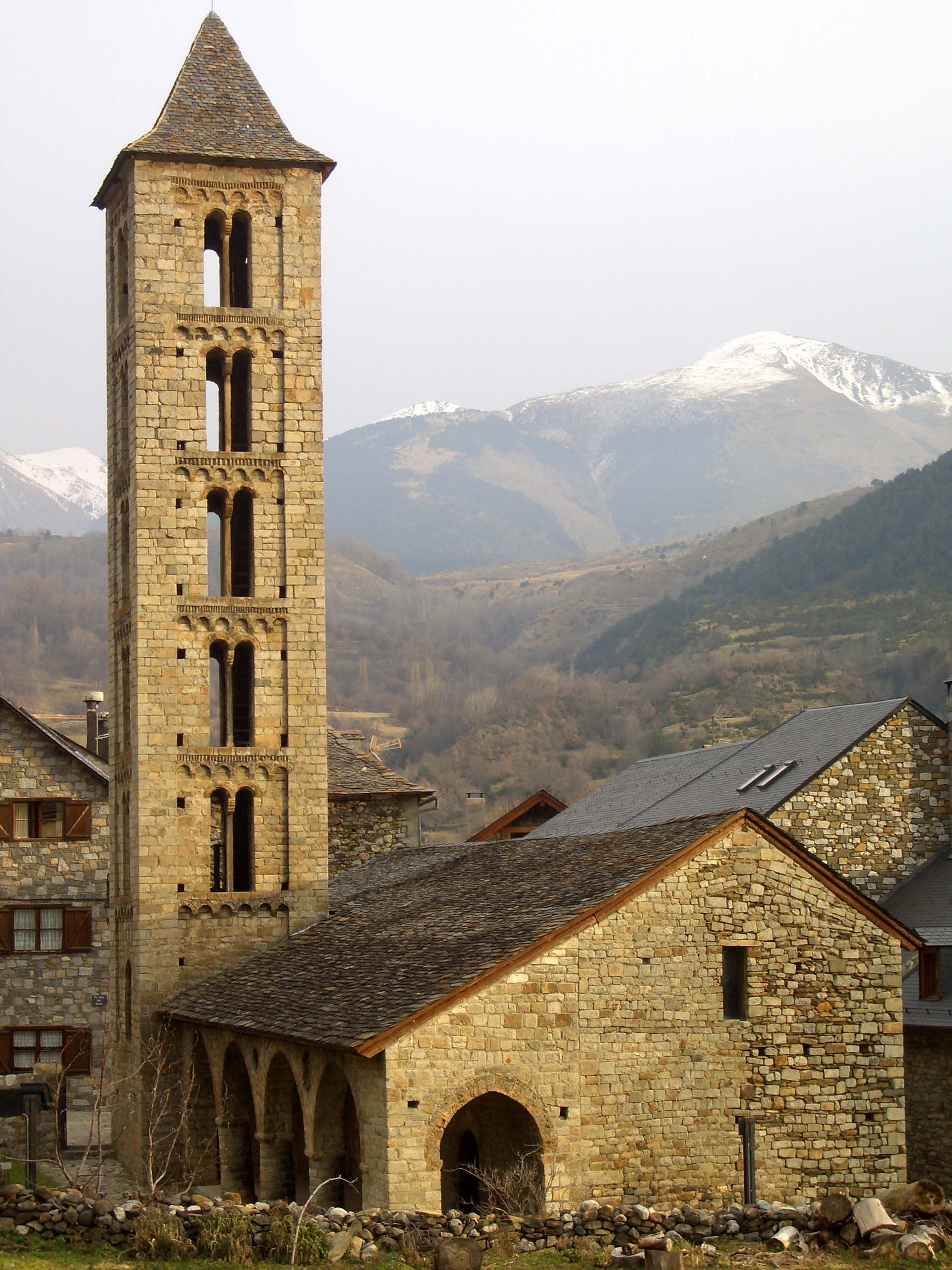
Santa Eulàlia d'Erill la Vall

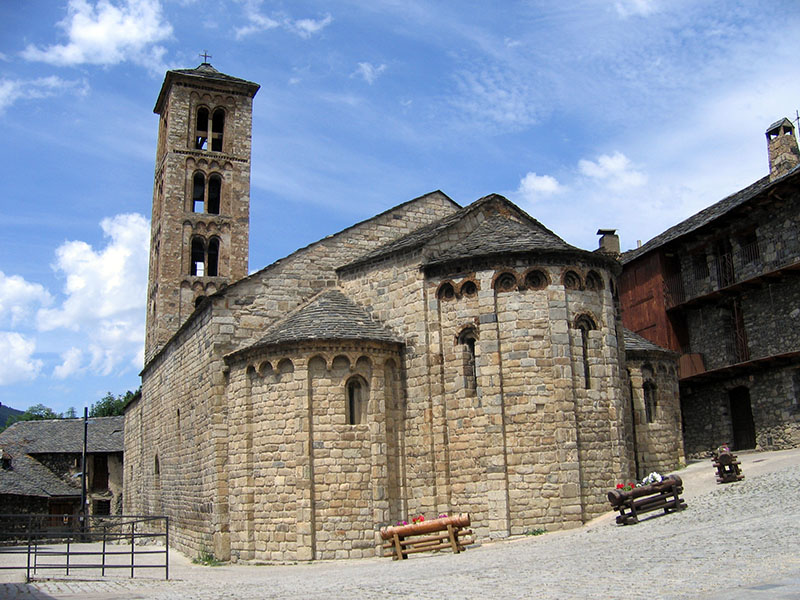
Santa Maria, Taüll

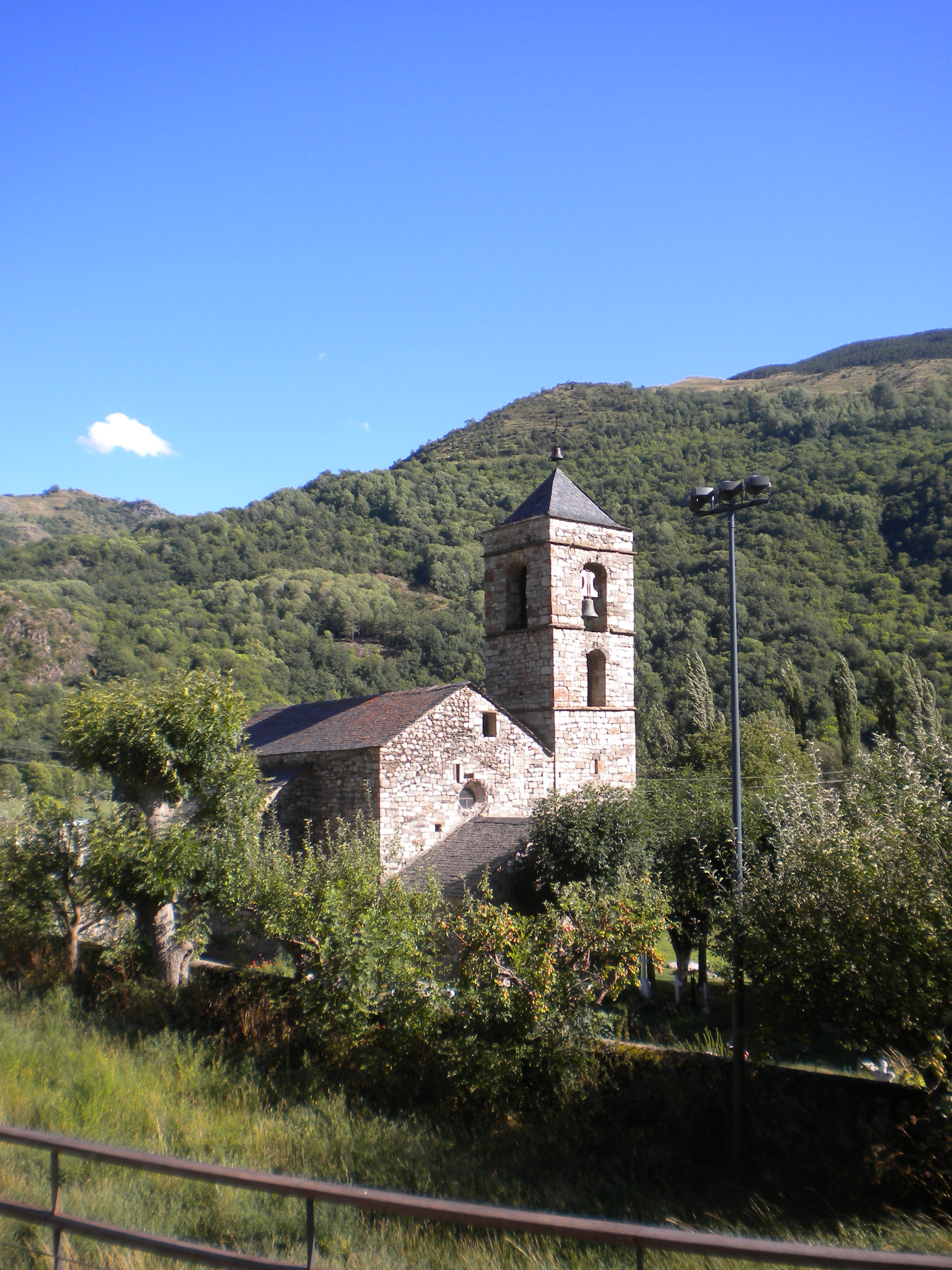
Sant Feliu, Barruera

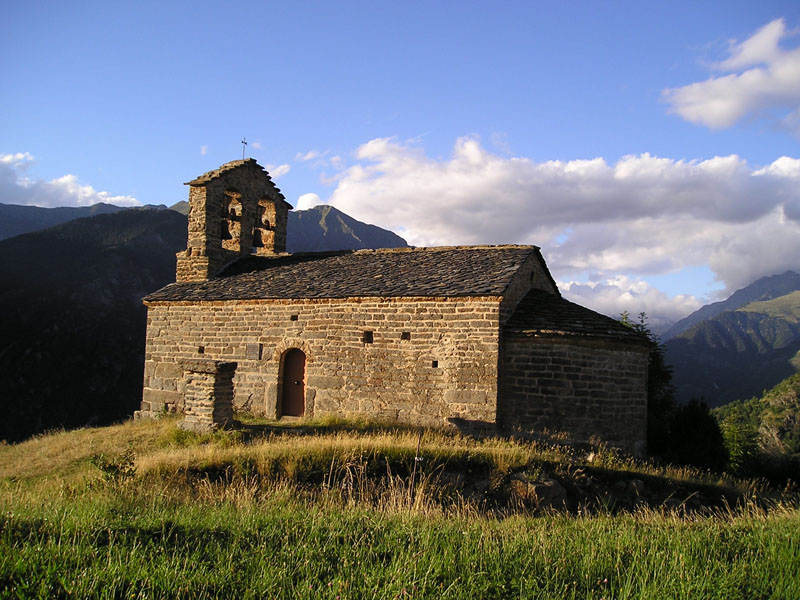
Sant Quirc, Durro

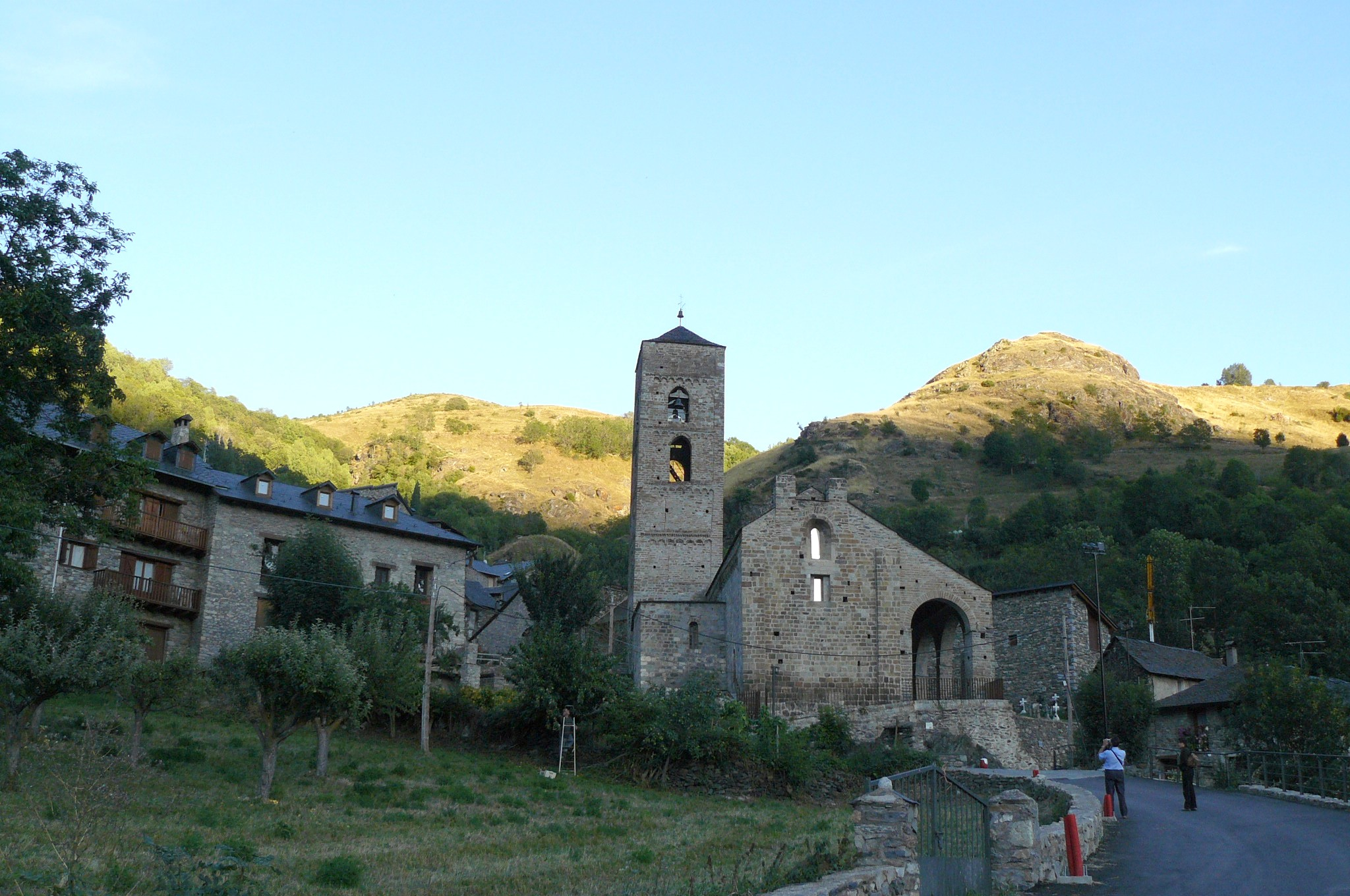
La Nativitat, Durro

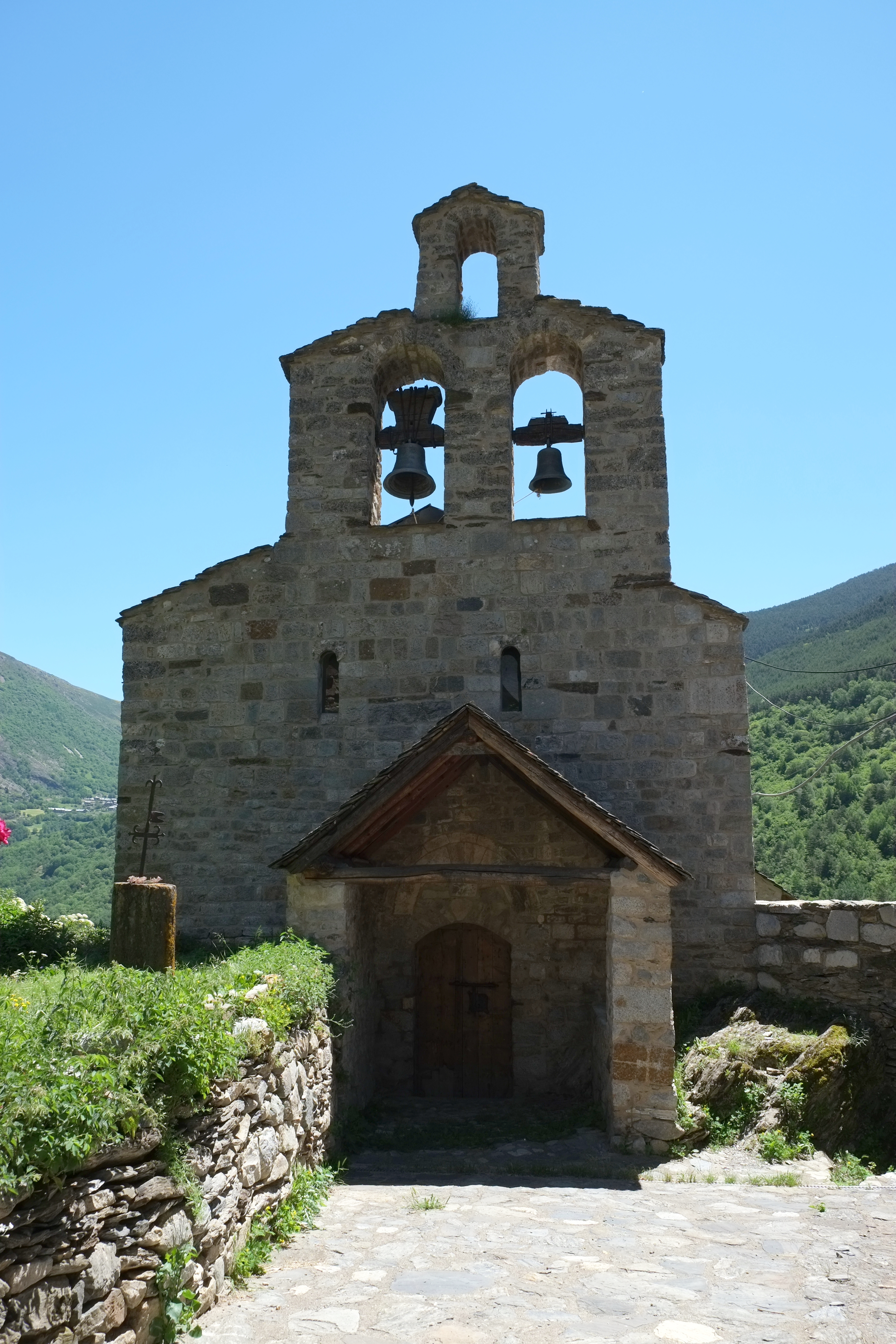
Santa Maria, Cardet

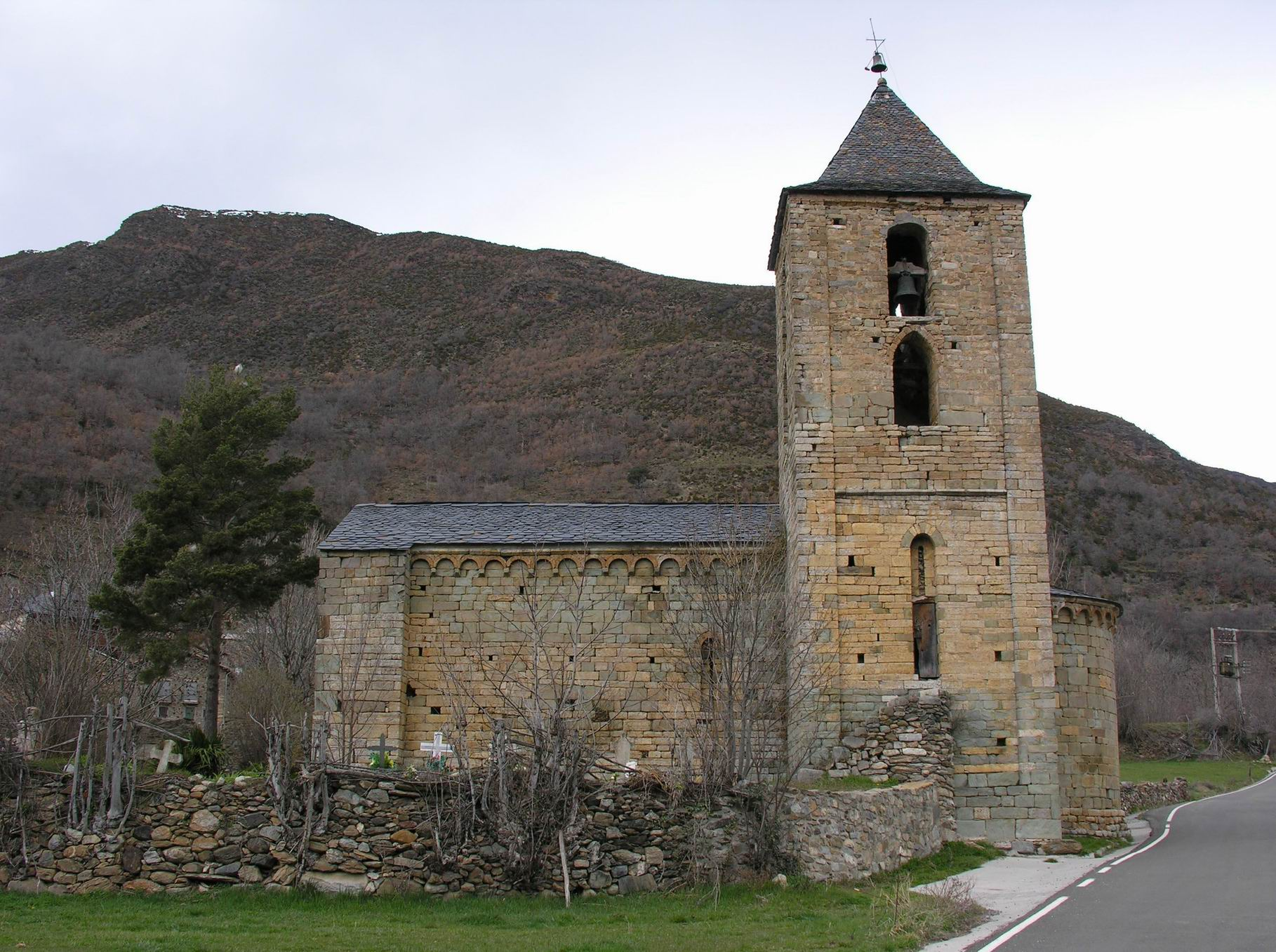
Santa Maria, Cóll

== See also ==
- Romanesque architecture in Spain
- Spanish Romanesque
- List of regional characteristics of Romanesque churches
