= Sant Feliu de Barruera =

Church building in La Vall de Boí, Spain

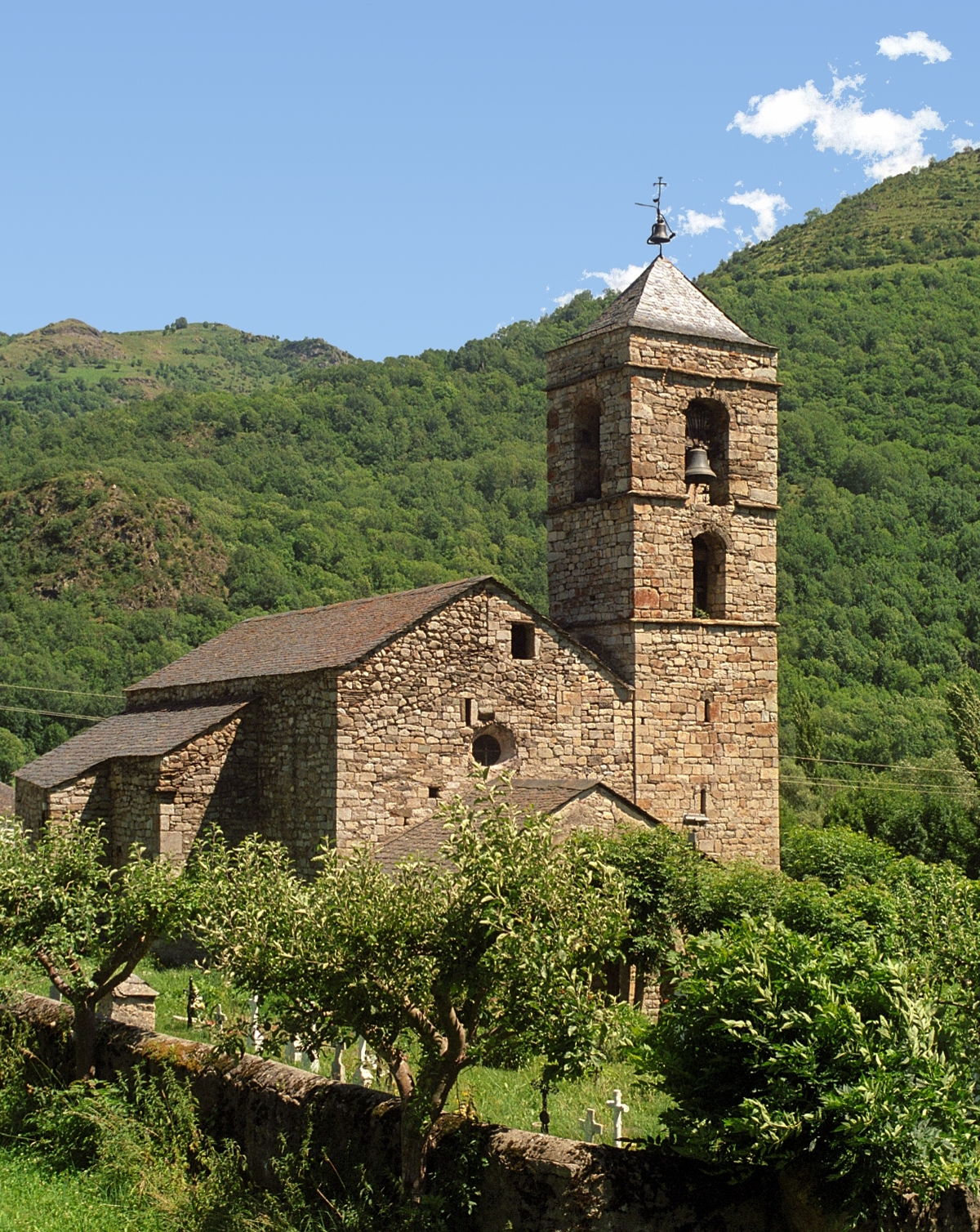

- Location within Spain

Religion
- Affiliation: Roman Catholic

Location
- Location: Barruera, Catalonia, Spain
- Interactive map of Sant Feliu de Barruera
- Coordinates: 42.504061°N 0.802488°E

Architecture
- Type: Church
- Style: Romanesque
- UNESCO World Heritage Site
- Official name: Catalan Romanesque Churches of the Vall de Boí
- Type: Cultural
- Criteria: ii, iv
- Designated: 2000 (24th session)
- Reference no.: 988
- Region: Europe and North America

Sant Feliu de Barruera is a Romanesque church situated in the territory of Vall de Boí, a commune in the valley with the same name and Comarca of Alta Ribagorça in the north of Province of Lleida and the autonomous communities of Catalonia in Spain.

== History ==
Like Sant Climent, Taüll, Sant Joan de Boí, Santa Eulàlia d'Erill la Vall or Santa Maria de Taüll, the date of construction of Sant Feliu is believed to be in 11th century.

In November 2000, it was included in the world heritage site of UNESCO with eight other Catalan Romanesque Churches of the Vall de Boí.

== Architecture ==
The church was originally meant to be constructed in a similar manner like the other churches in Vall de Boí, but the construction plan was not followed or the construction was modified significantly. The church has a unique nave, covering a barrel vault with a semi-circular apse in the east. The nave is divided into three bays. The choir is marked by its triumphal arc. It is illuminated by three straight bays. In the north, we find a lateral chapel with a semi-circular apse doubling the principal apse. Outside the church, the principal apse is decorated with blind arcades and Lombard bands, while the lateral chapel is devoid of any such characteristics.

== Gallery ==
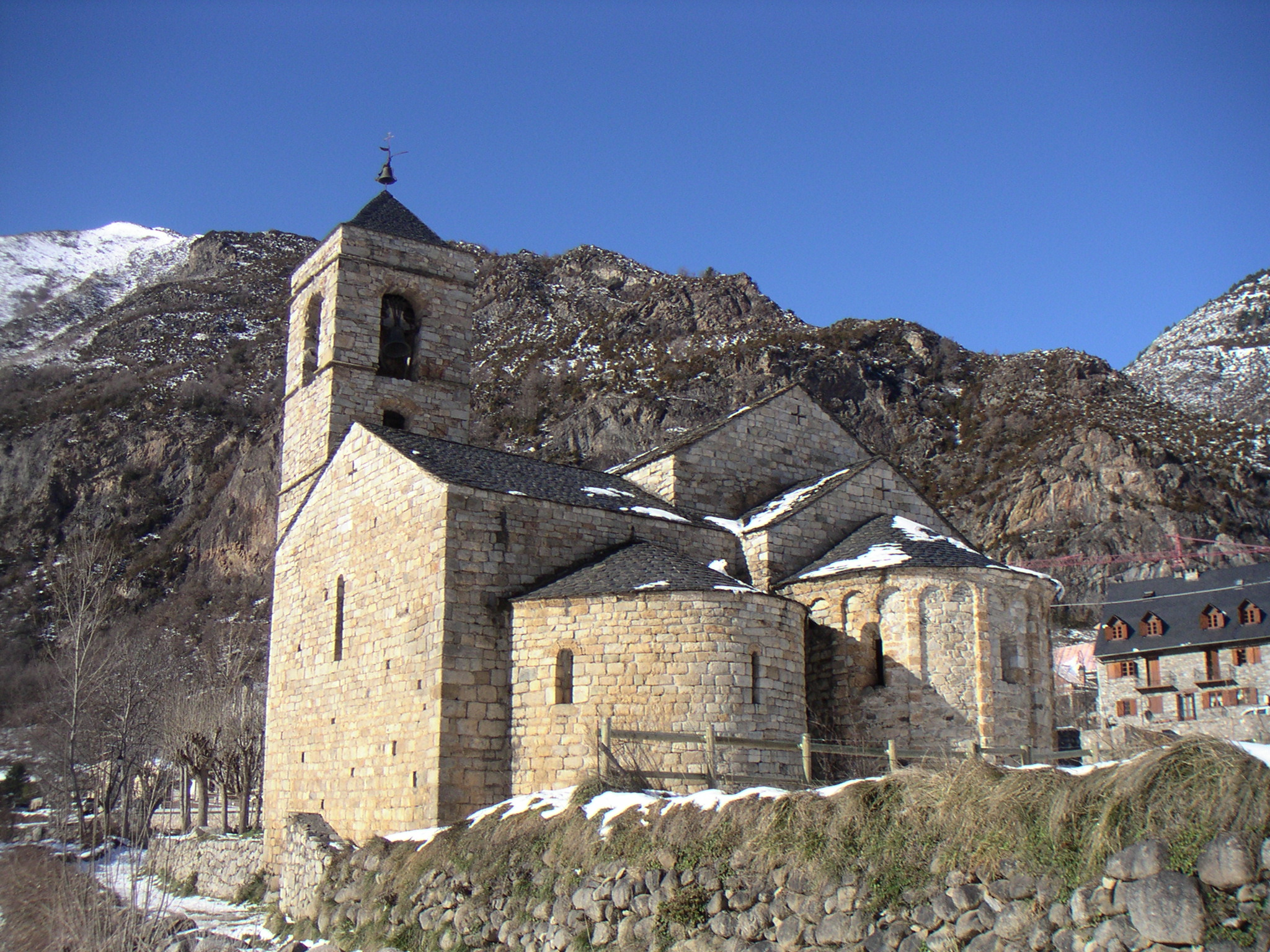
The church and its chevet

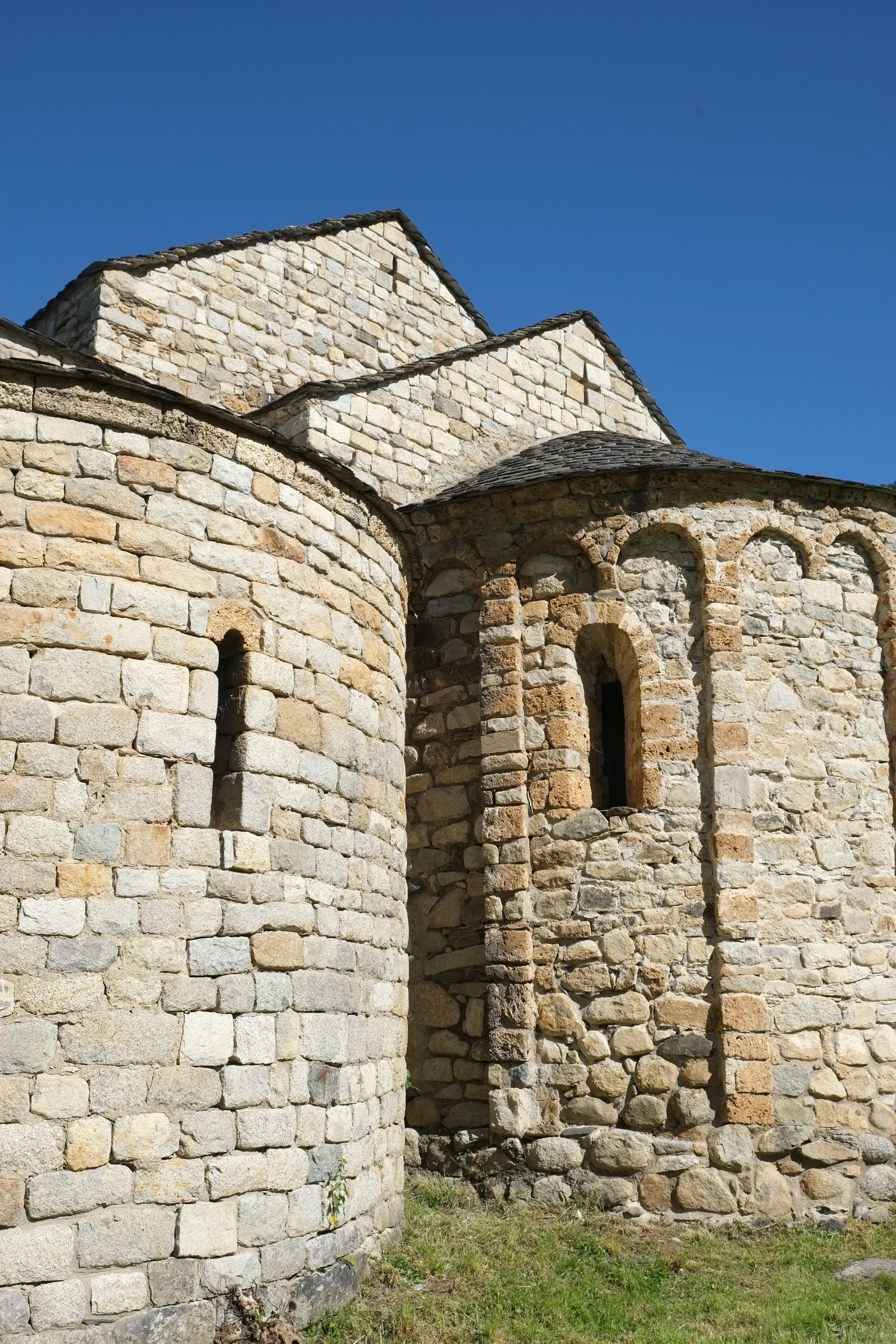
Chevet

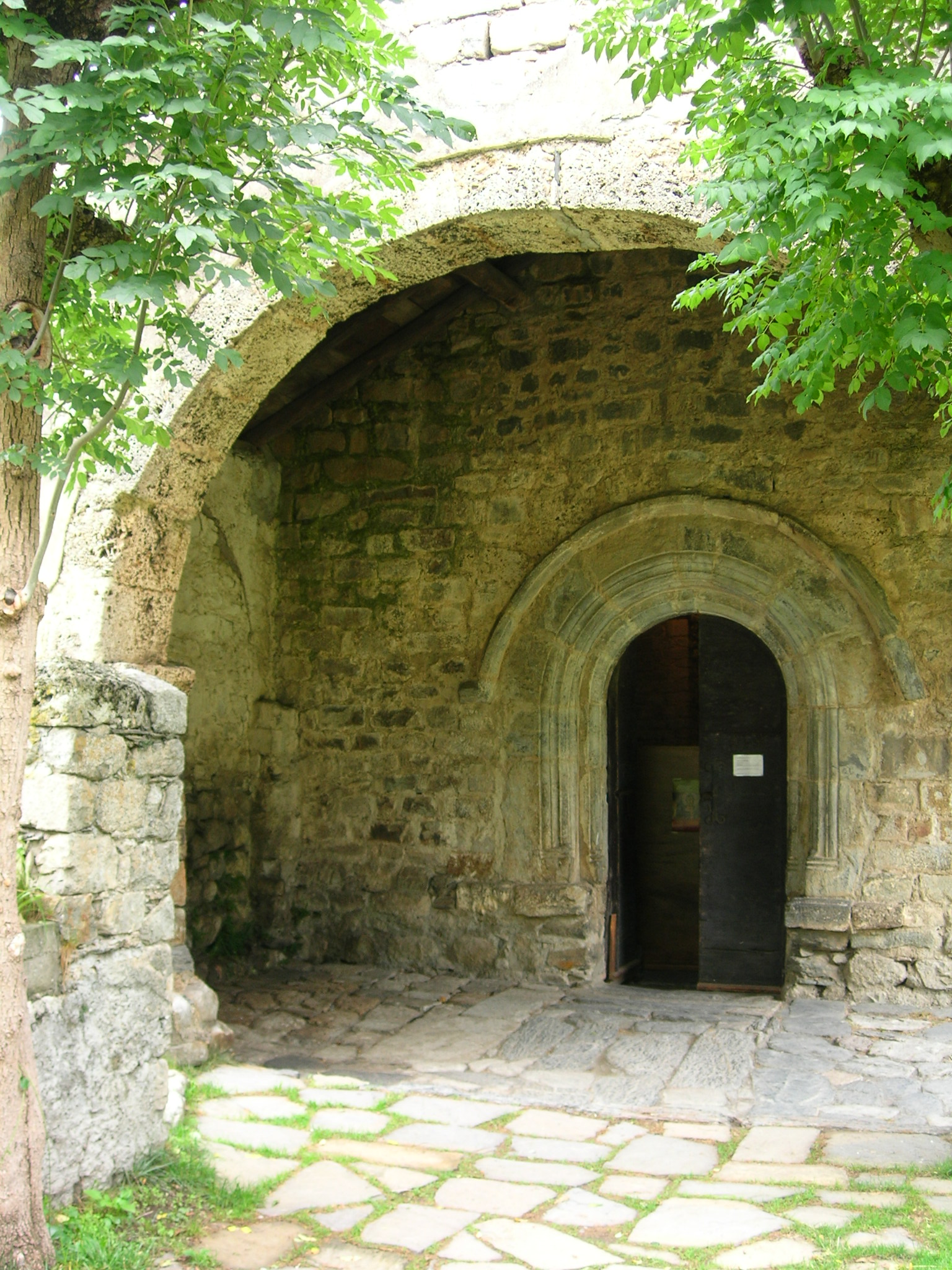
Gate
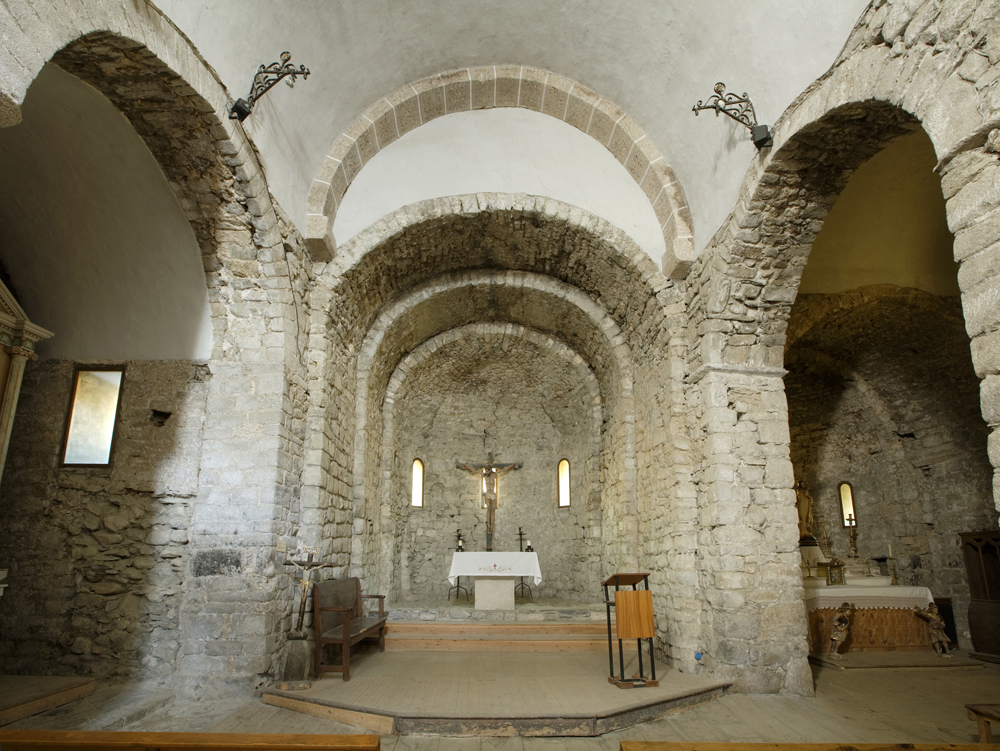
Nave and choir

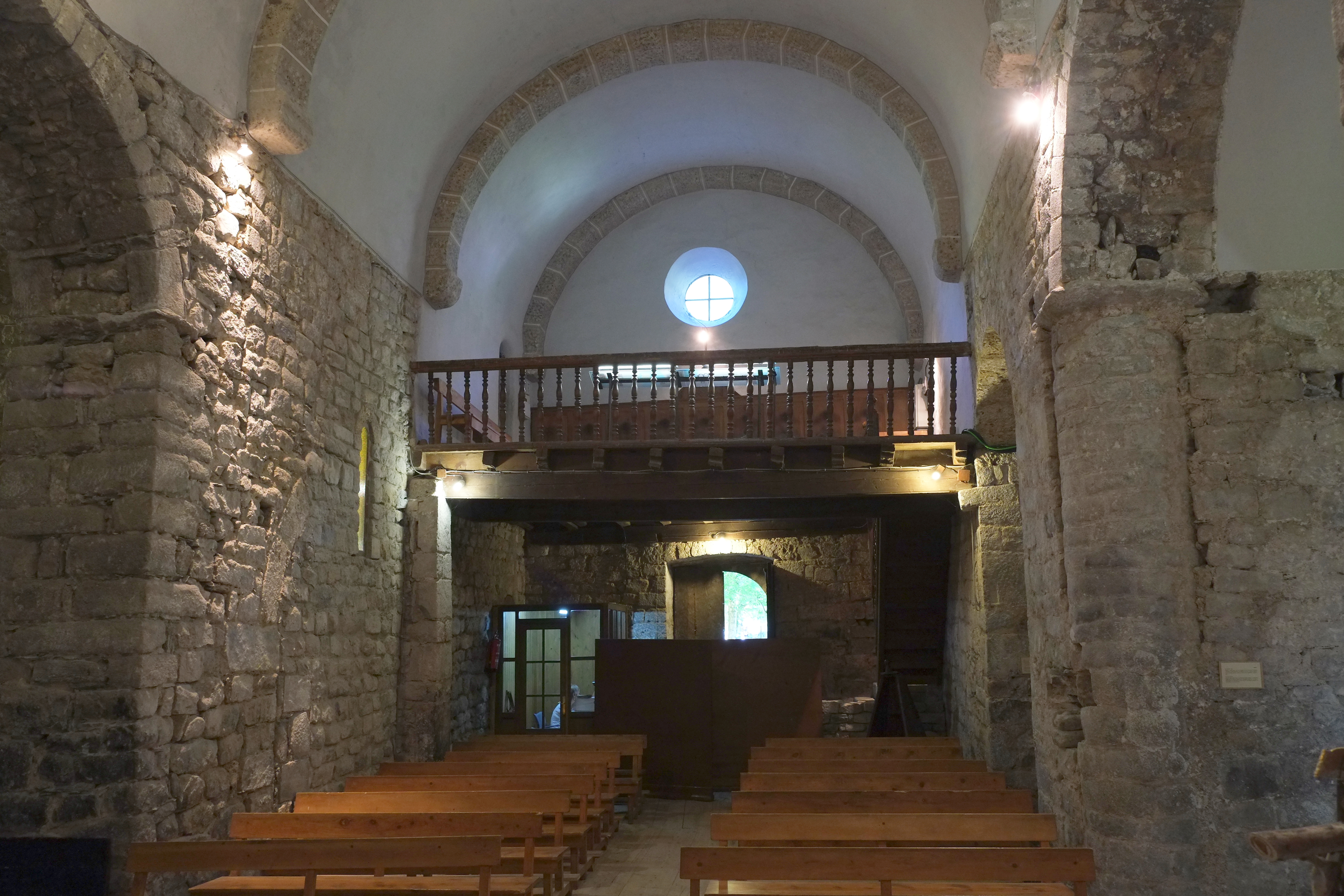
Nave and tribune
