= Erill la Vall Descent from the Cross =

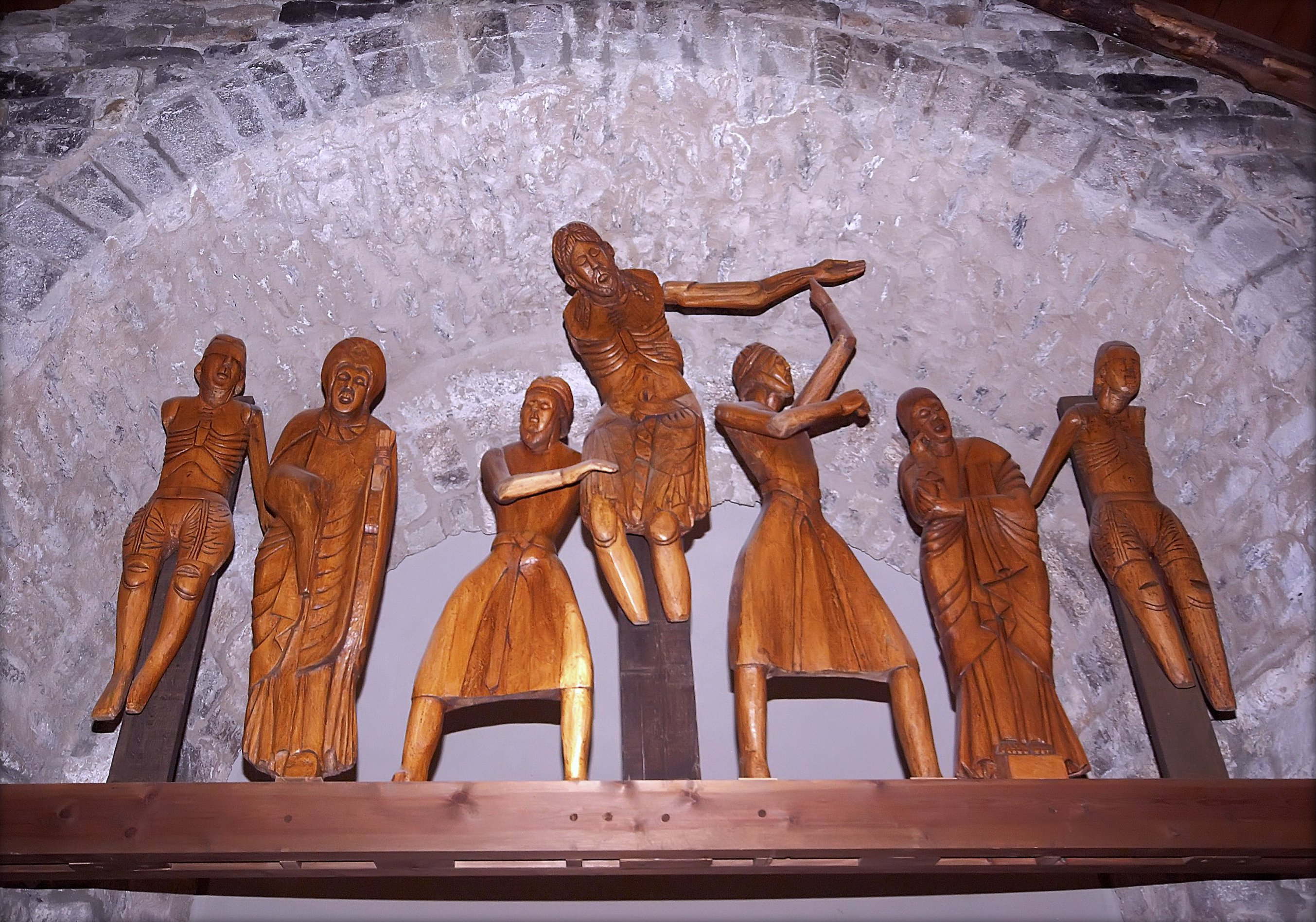
- Artist: Unknown
- Year: Second half of the 12th century
- Type: Wood carving with tempera polychrome remains
- Location: Museu Nacional d'Art de Catalunya and Museu Episcopal de Vic; Barcelona and Vic

Erill la Vall Descent from the Cross is a set of seven 12th-century wooden sculptures from the Pyrenees village of Erill la Vall in Catalonia. Originally painted, it comprises a complete Romanesque Descent from the Cross sculpture group, which in Catalonia has the peculiarity that it is made up of seven figures. Two of the carvings are kept at the National Art Museum of Catalonia (MNAC) and the rest at the Vic Episcopal Museum.

== Description ==
In the centre was the figure of Jesus Christ held by Joseph of Arimathea and unnailed by Nicodemus, flanked by the Virgin Mary and Saint John the Evangelist on either side, with the penitent and impenitent thieves, Dismas and Gestas, at the ends, respectively. The subject of the Descent adds a more narrative and dramatic feel to the representation of the Passion of Christ, and these sculptures were probably used in Medieval liturgical drama. The MNAC's collection preserves figures from the Descents of Santa Maria de Taüll and Durro, both in the Vall de Boí (Boí Valley, a UNESCO World Heritage Site).

=== The Virgin and Saint John ===
The monumental sculptural groups in wood of the Descent from the Cross are an important chapter in Romanesque carving in Catalonia on account of the high artistic quality of the works preserved and of the unique features of their iconography. A significant proportion comes from the Boí Valley (Vall de Boí). One aspect that sets these Catalan series of carvings apart from other renderings of this theme is the presence of seven figures: in the centre was the figure of Christ, sustained by Joseph of Arimathea (on his right, the left for the observer) and Nicodemus on his right; on either side are Mary and St John, and at the ends the figures of the two thieves, Dismas and Gestas.

The theme of the Descent brings a greater narrative and dramatic sense to the treatment of the two episodes of the Calvary and may be related to the liturgical plays of the time. But the presence of these groups in Catalonia during the twelfth and thirteenth centuries, as some have tried to demonstrate, could also correspond to the struggle against the heresy of Catharism. As the subject could have a Eucharistic meaning, it could be used as a reply to the Cathars' negation of the death of Christ and of the Eucharist itself.

The Erill la Vall Descent is the most complete of all the known groups from the Catalan western Pyrenees, but all the figures are not exhibited together, being dispersed between the Vic Episcopal Museum and the National Art Museum of Catalonia, although the two museums sometimes loan the works out to one another to display them as a complete set.

As a whole it is a masterpiece of Romanesque carving in Catalonia, to the extent that other works have been arranged around it, such as the Descent from Santa Maria de Taüll, what remains of the one from Durro, as well as works of other types (altar frontals, crucifixes)

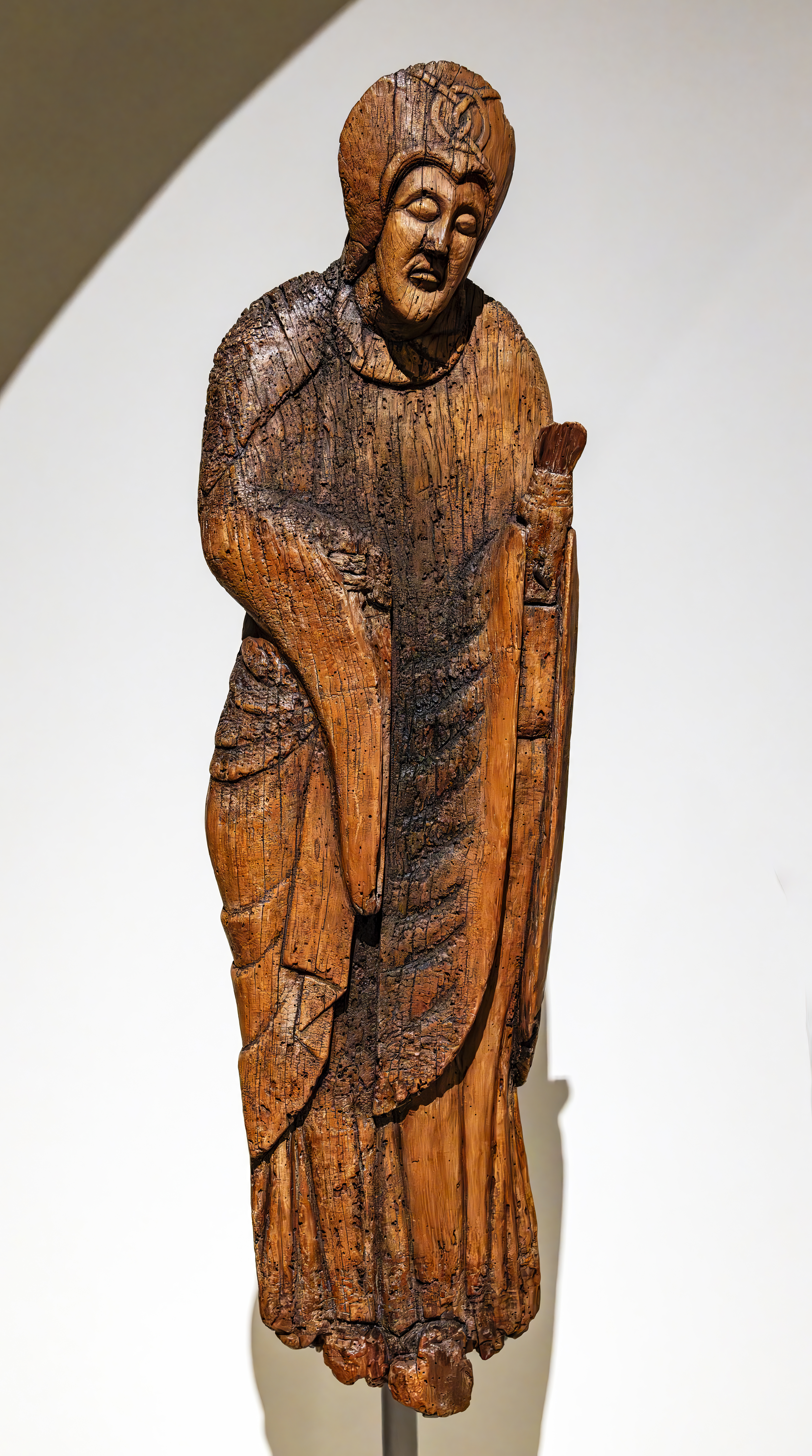
Original statue of the Virgin in Museu Nacional d'Art de Catalunya

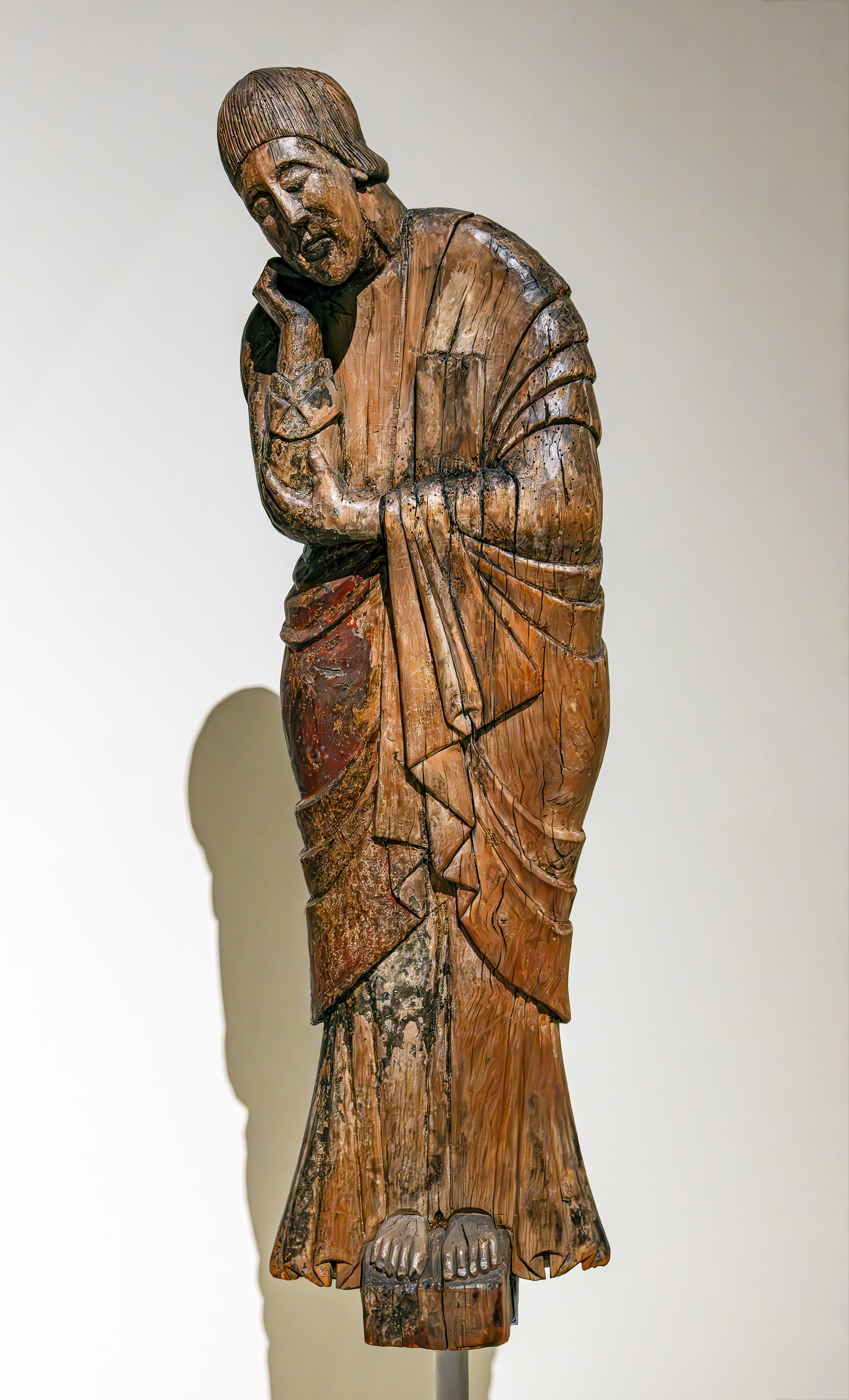
Original statue of Saint John Museu Nacional d'Art de Catalunya
