= Santa Eulàlia d'Erill la Vall =

Church building in Erill la Vall, Spain

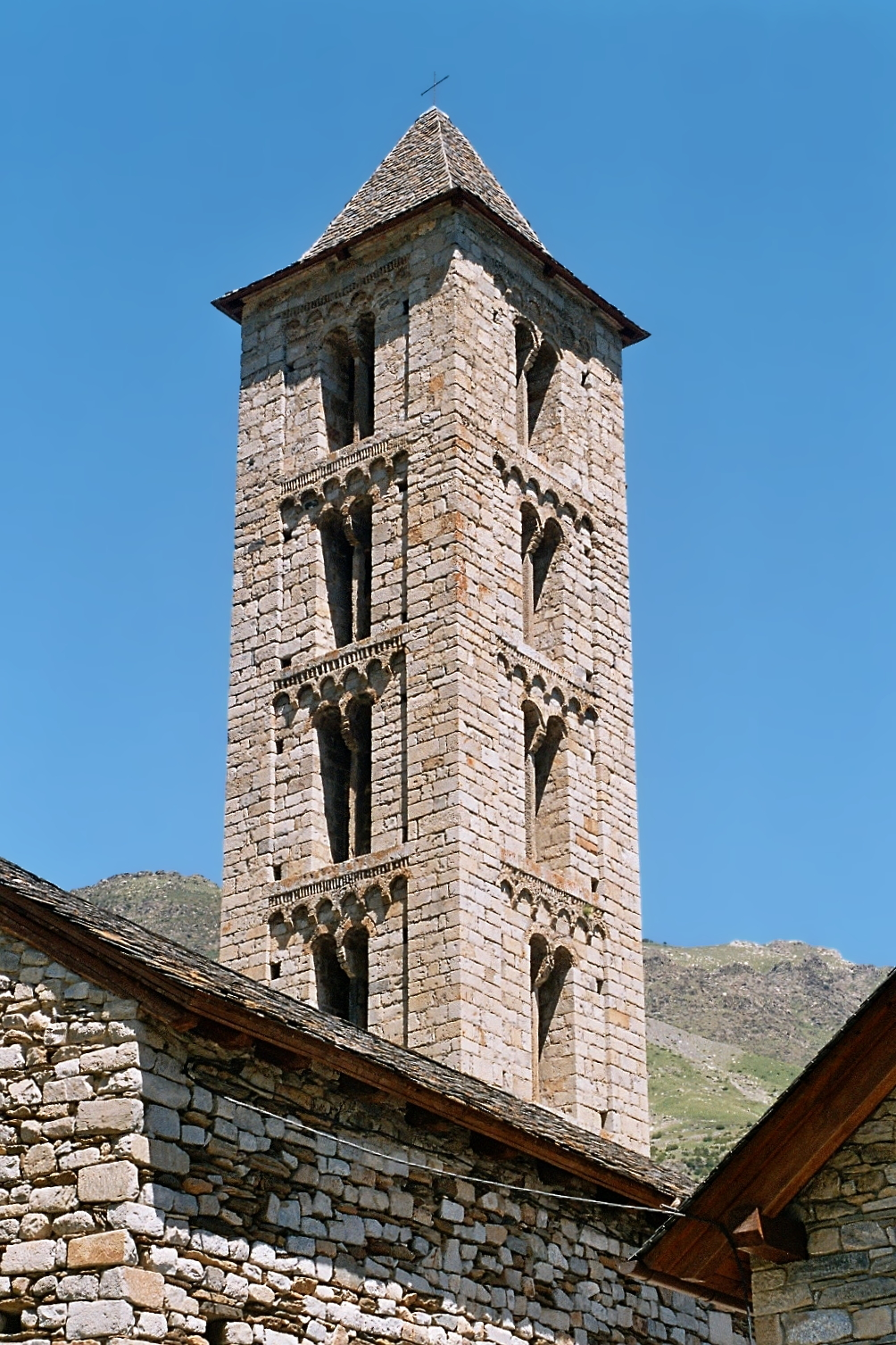

- Location within Spain

Religion
- Affiliation: Roman Catholic

Location
- Location: Erill la Vall, Catalonia, Spain
- Interactive map of Santa Eulàlia d'Erill la Vall
- Coordinates: 42.53044°N 0.832167°E

Architecture
- Type: Church
- Style: Romanesque
- UNESCO World Heritage Site
- Official name: Catalan Romanesque Churches of the Vall de Boí
- Type: Cultural
- Criteria: ii, iv
- Designated: 2000 (24th session)
- Reference no.: 988
- Region: Europe and North America

Santa Eulàlia d'Erill la Vall is a Romanesque church situated in Erill la Vall, in the territory of Vall de Boí, a commune in the valley with the same name and in Comarca of Alta Ribagorça in the north of Province of Lleida and the autonomous communities of Catalonia in Spain.

== History ==
Like Sant Climent, Taüll, Sant Joan de Boí, Sant Feliu de Barruera or Santa Maria de Taüll, the date of construction of Sant Feliu is believed to be in 11th century.

In November 2000, it was included in the world heritage site of UNESCO with eight other Catalan Romanesque Churches of the Vall de Boí.

== Architecture ==
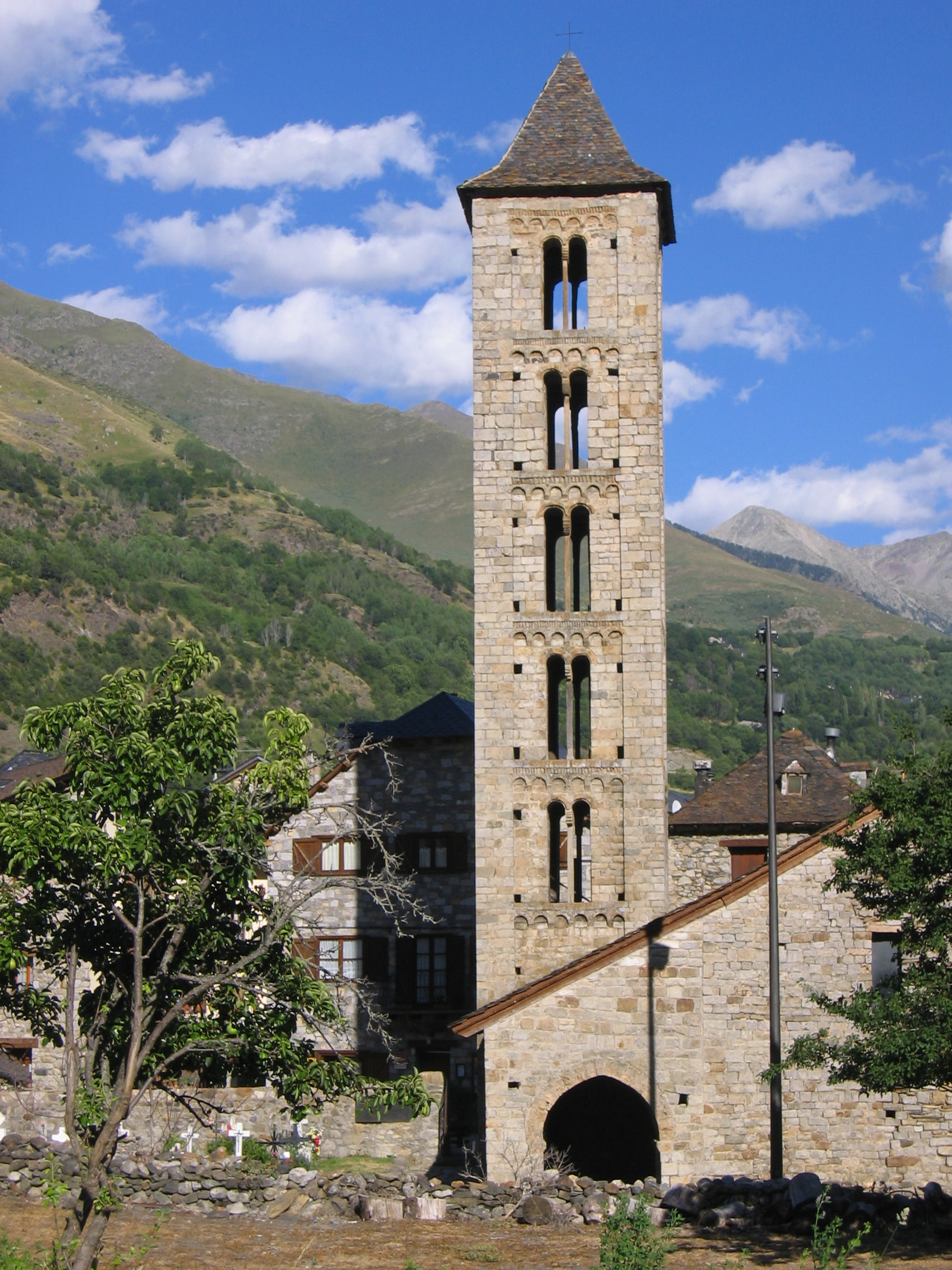
Bell tower

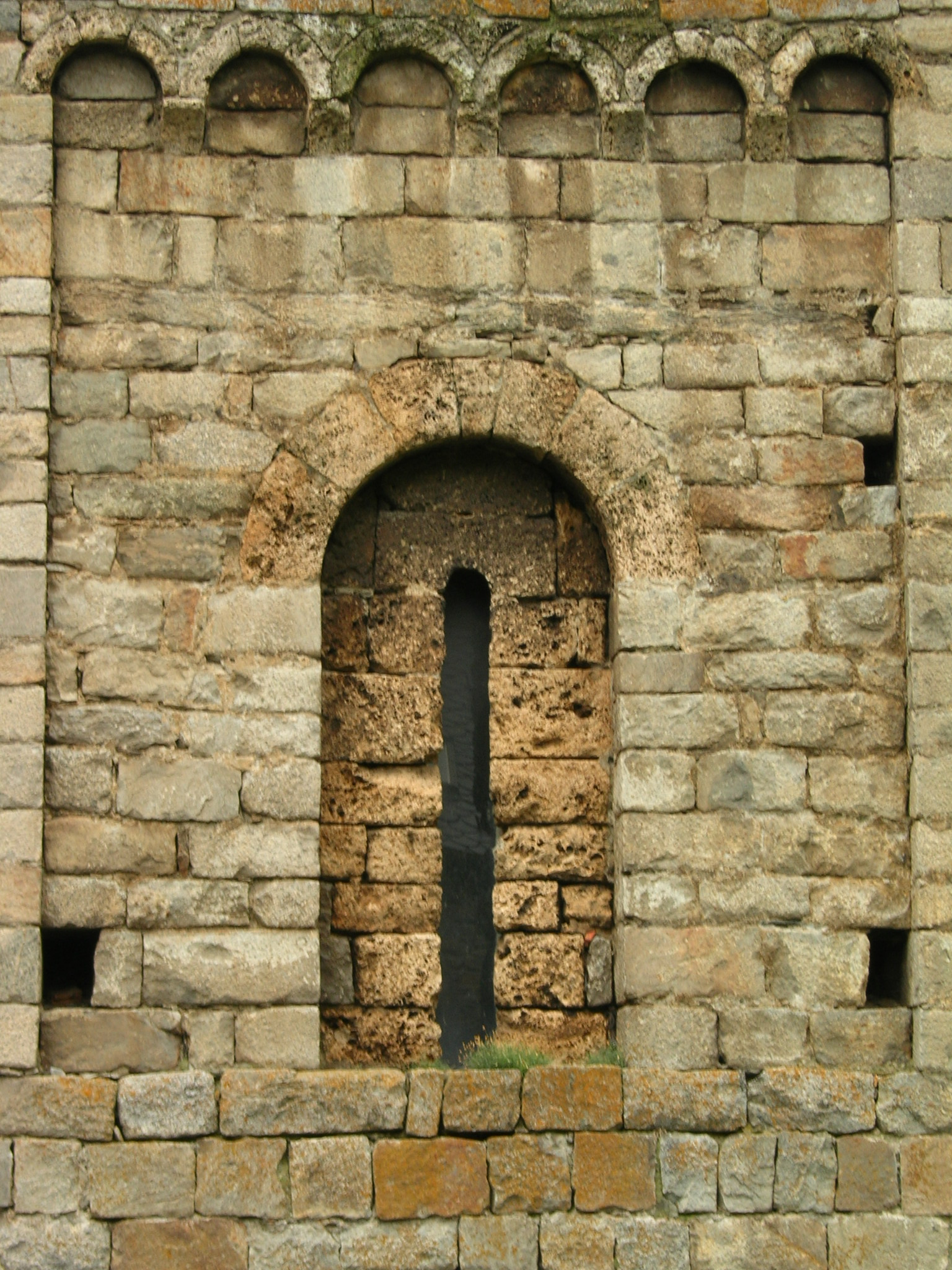
Window of bell tower

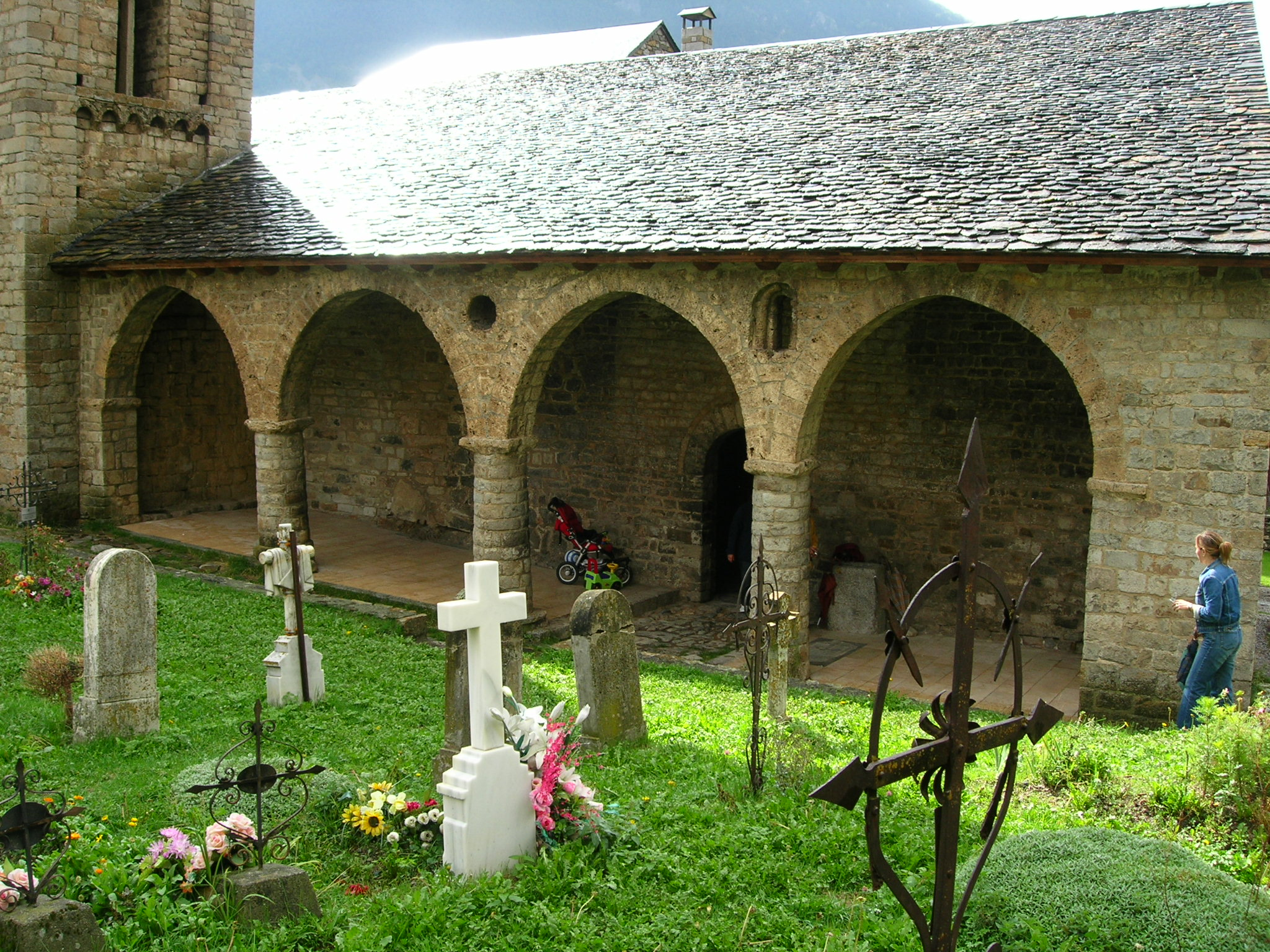
Cemetery and porch

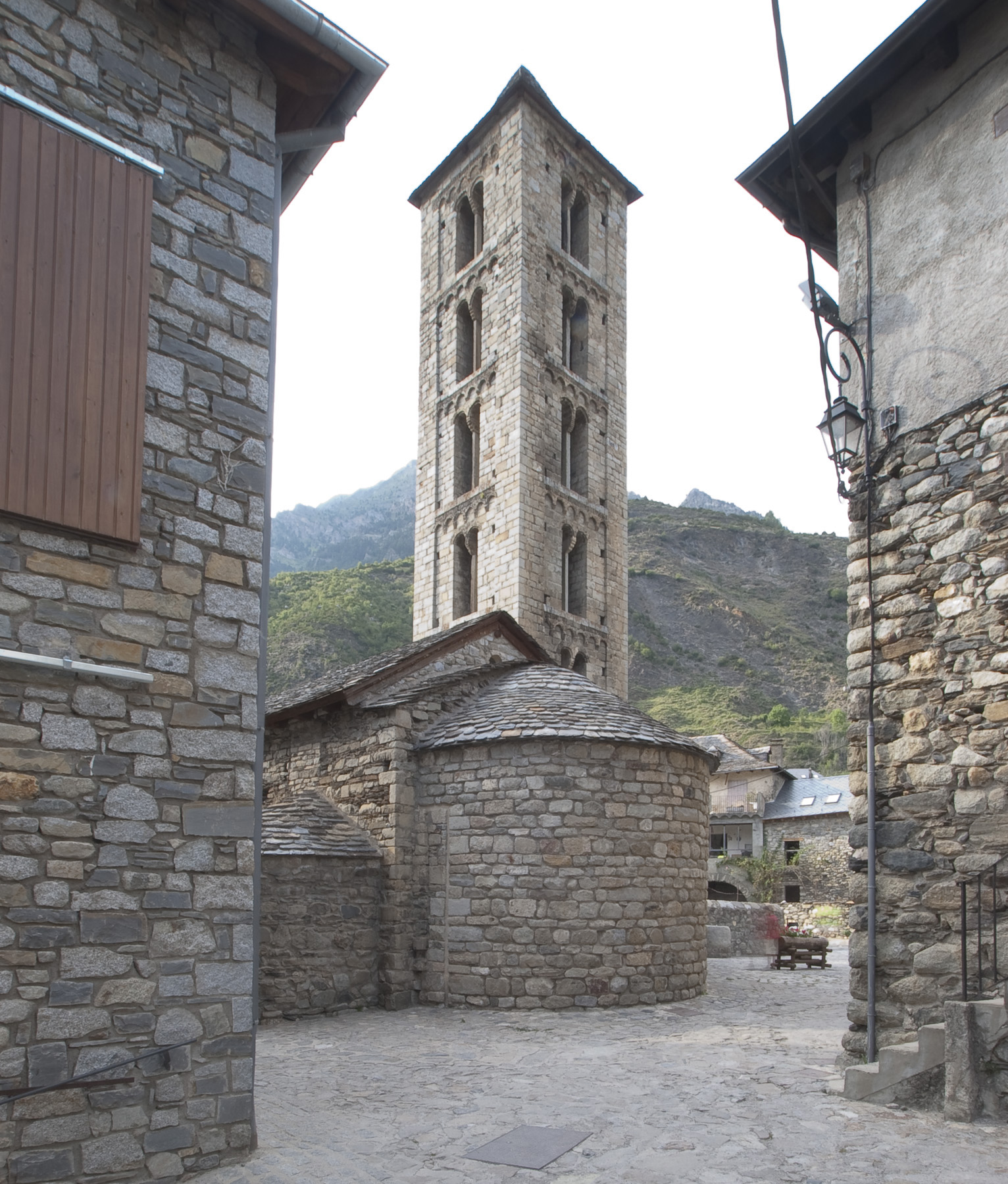
Apse and bell tower

== Sculpture ==
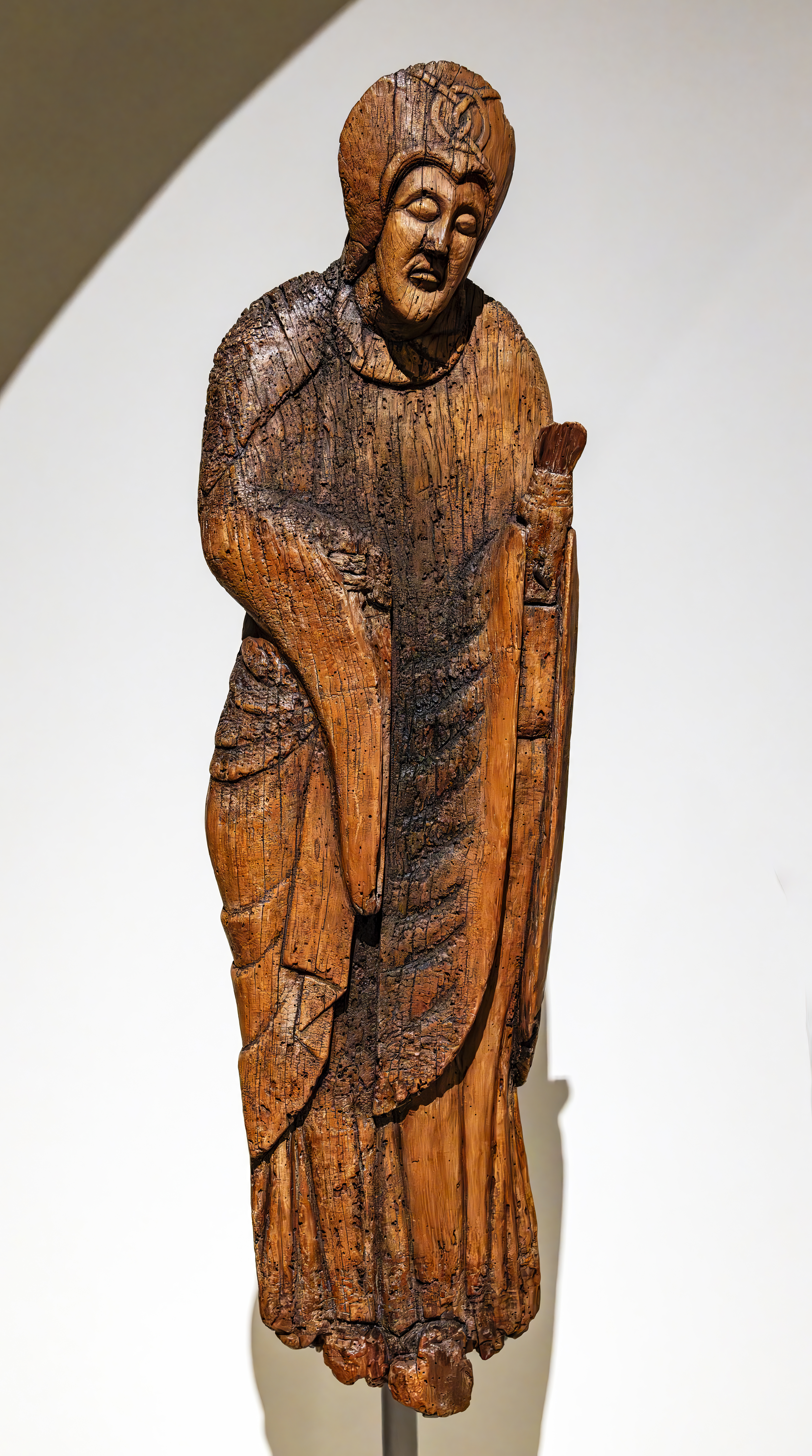
Original statue of the Virgin Museu Nacional d'Art de Catalunya

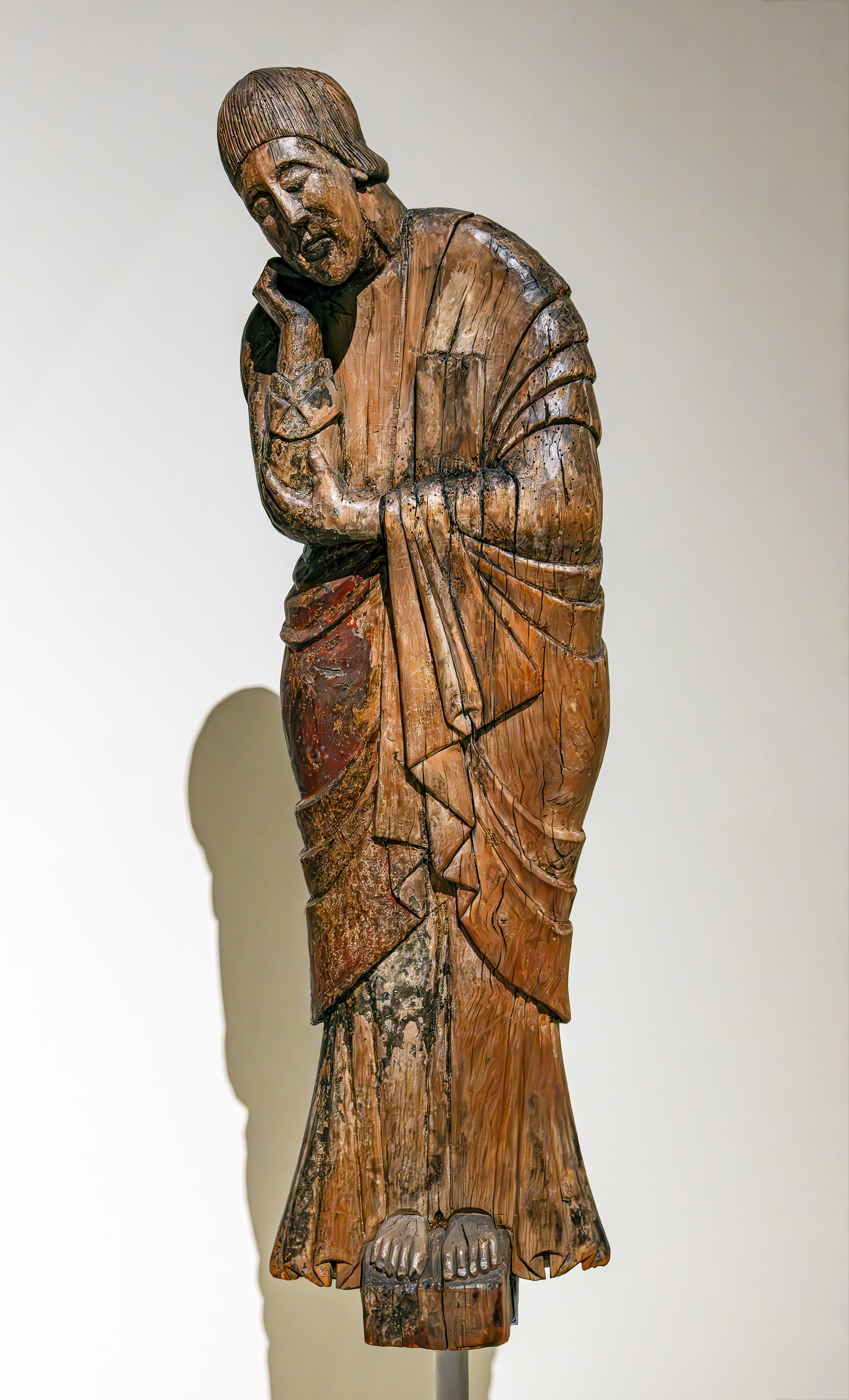
Original statue of Saint John Museu Nacional d'Art de Catalunya
