= Taüll =

- Locality
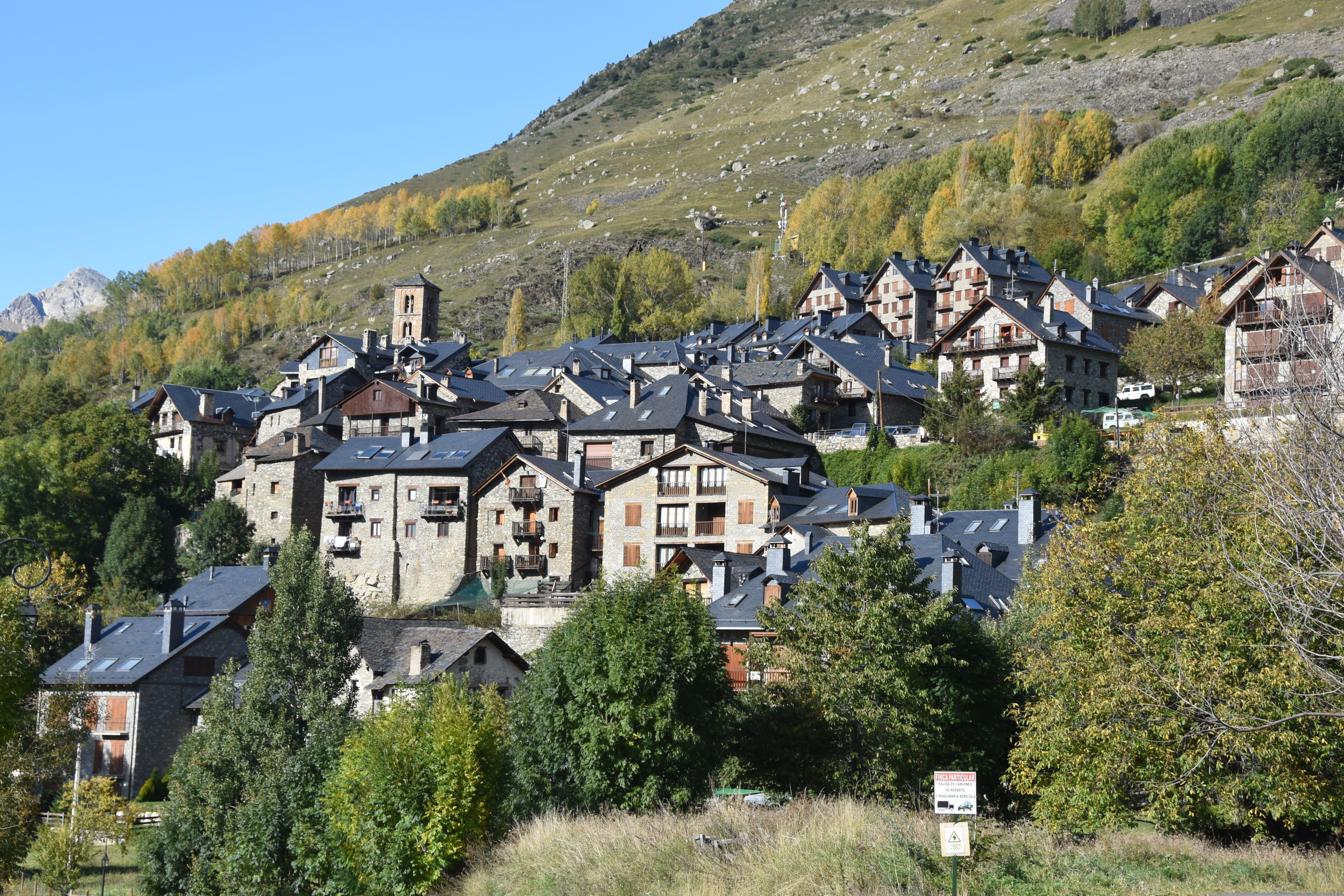

- Location in Catalonia Taüll (Catalonia) Taüll (Spain)
- Coordinates: 42°31′10.05″N 0°50′54.98″E
- Country: Spain
- Autonomous community: Catalonia
- Province: Lleida
- Comarca: Alta Ribagorça
- Municipality: Vall de Boí

Population
  - Total: 272
- Time zone: UTC+1 (CET)
  - Summer (DST): UTC+2 (CEST)
- Postal code: 25528

Taüll (Catalan pronunciation: [təˈuʎ]) is a town in the province of Lleida, in Catalonia, Spain. It is home to the church of Sant Climent de Taüll, an excellent example of Romanesque architecture, one of the Catalan Romanesque Churches of the Vall de Boí declared World Heritage Site by UNESCO.

Taüll is one of the villages of the municipality of Vall de Boí in the comarca of Alta Ribagorça.

== Etymology ==
According to Catalan linguist Joan Coromines, the name Taüll comes from the Ibero-Basque roots (a) ta-uri > (a) ta-uli: "the village of the (mountain's) door".

== Location ==
It is located at the bottom of Vall de Boí. The town as of 2008 had 270 inhabitants. In order to get to Taüll, from the city of Lleida take the N-230 road, that begins in Lleida and finishes in Vielha. The N-230 goes through the village of Pont de Suert. At the end of the village turn right to take the L-500, the main road of the Valley of Boí. Continue on this road after leave behind Barruera until another fork. Turn to the right at L-501, reaching the settlements of Boí and Taüll and finishing at the ski resort of Boí-Taüll.

== History ==
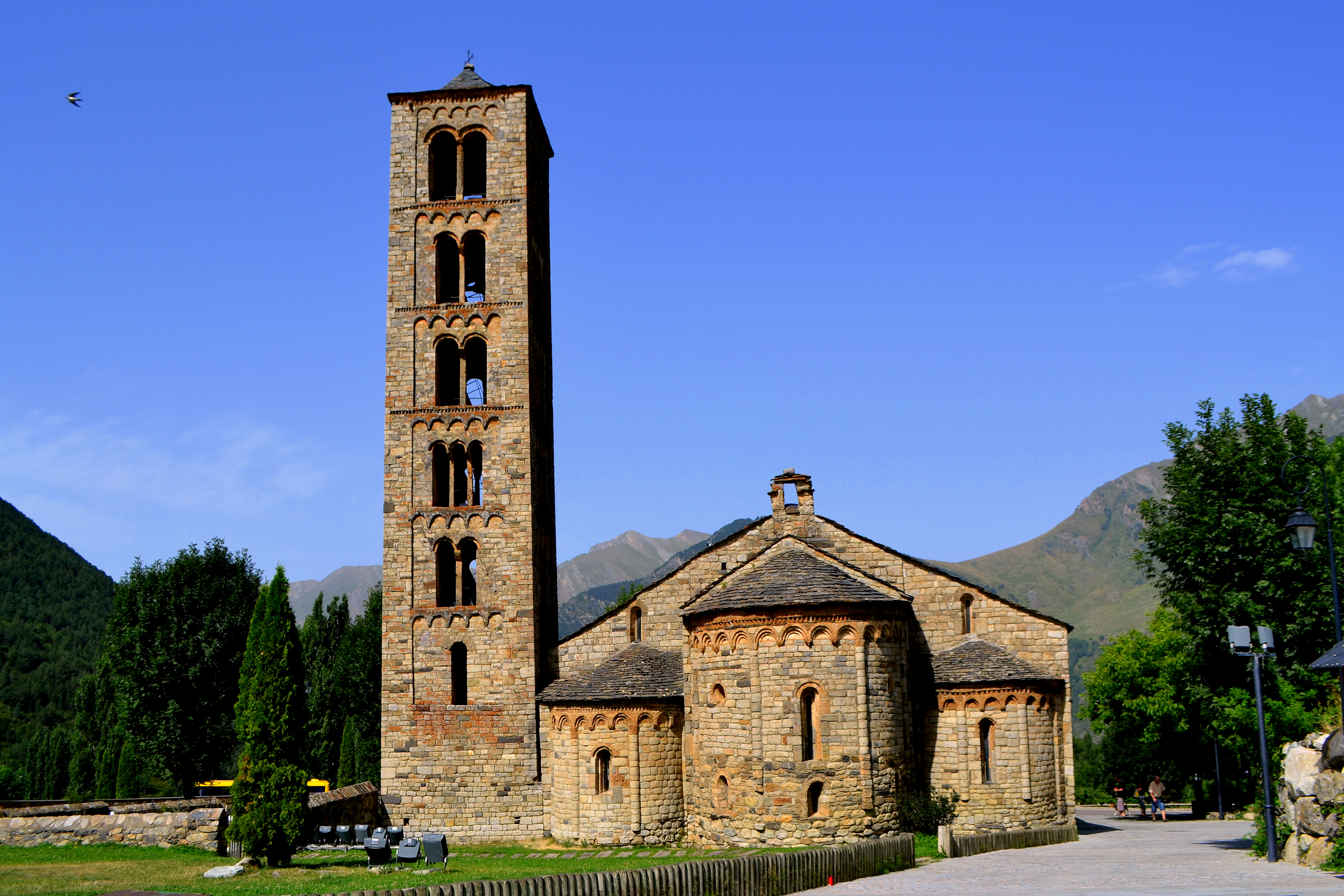
Church of St. Clement of Taüll

In 806 the Count of Toulouse freed the region from the Muslim domination and from the tribute they had to pay. Later, the Valley of Boí was given to the county of Pallars, dependent on the Church of Urgell.

In 911, after a serious conflict with the Church of Urgell, a diocese was established which included the counties of Pallars and Ribagorça.

In 949, both counties separated: Ribagorça remained in the new bishopric while Pallars came back again under the Church of Urgell. Further juridic conflicts made both counties join again and until the early 12th century the region didn't have any sort of stability. It was at this time when the region was favored by Alfons I "El Batallador", due to the direct participation of the region's lords in his reconquest campaign, finally reaching a stable and prosperous period. The lords of Erill had the villages of Taüll and Boí under their jurisdiction, whose amassed wealth allowed all the rustic churches in the valley to be renewed, building the churches of Sant Climent, Sant Martí (destroyed by an avalanche in the 1970s) and Santa Maria, featuring a richly decorated Romanesque architecture with outstanding liturgical furniture.

The lords of Erill were a very important barony in the Pyrenees. They are known because of the planning and construction of the churches in the Valley of Boí. The valley was dominated by the Erills, whose castle is in the nowadays abandoned village of Erillcastell. The name of Taüll means ATA-ULI ("the peak of the village").

== Economy ==
Taüll's economy is based on summer and winter tourism, aside from its aforementioned Romanesque heritage, the town also has a variety of hotels, restaurants and guided hikes. Livestock, the traditional economic activity of the village, is still active.

== Geography ==
Located at an altitude of 1,520 meters in the Sant Martí valley, a small valley in the Valley of Boí. The closest river is the Sant Martí river, Noguera de Tor affluent. A ravine splits the village in two districts: La Guinsa and Lo Barri. La Guinsa goes from the entrance of the village to the ravine, and Lo Barri goes from the ravine to the high part of the village.

== Main sights ==
- Romanesque Church of Sant Climent de Taüll.
- Romanesque church of Santa Maria de Taüll.
