= Roca de la Feixa =

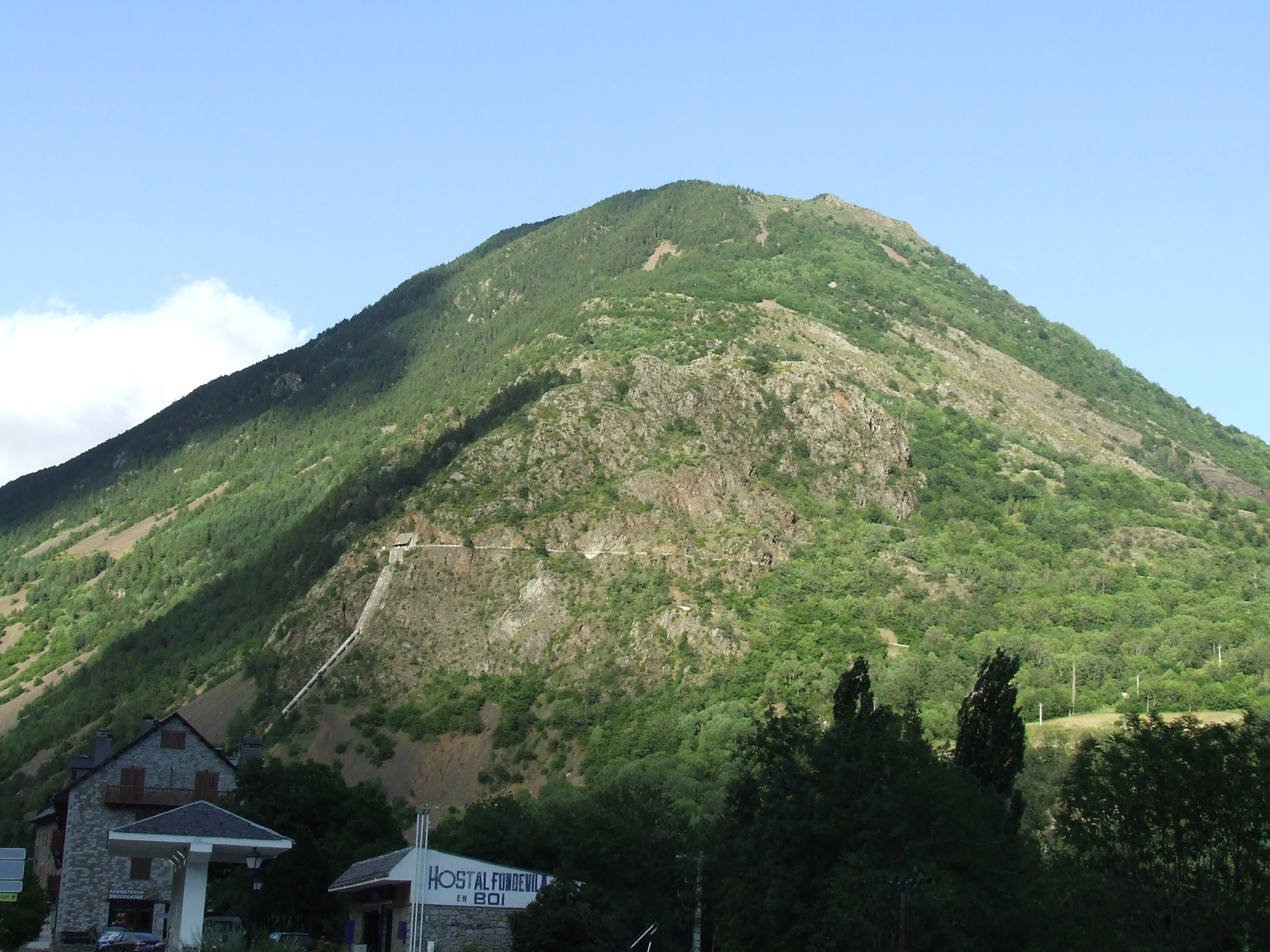
- Roca de la Feixa seen from Barruera

Highest point
- Elevation: 2,093 m (6,867 ft)
- Listing: Mountains in Catalonia
- Coordinates: 42°30′12.79″N 0°50′19.47″E

Geography
- Location: Alta Ribagorça, Catalonia
- Parent range: Pyrenees

Climbing
- First ascent: Unknown
- Easiest route: Drive to Durro, Vall de Boí, then hike

Roca de la Feixa is a massive mountain of the Pyrenees, Catalonia, Spain. It has an elevation of 2,093 metres above sea level.

This mountain's summit rises above Durro village. It is located within the municipal limits of Vall de Boí, Alta Ribagorça.
