= Santa Maria de Taüll =

Romanesque church in Vall de Boí, Catalonia

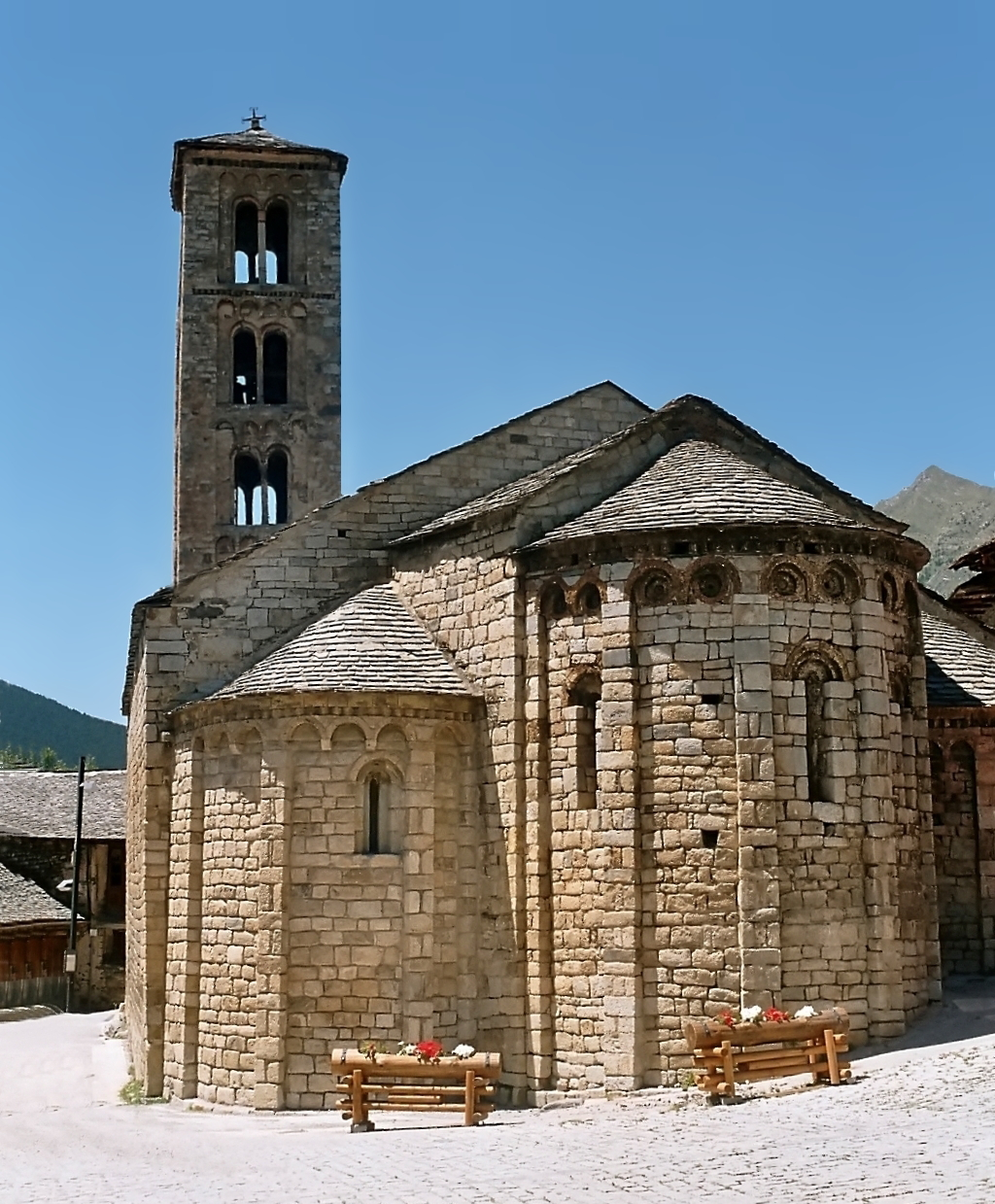

- Location within Spain

Religion
- Affiliation: Roman Catholic

Location
- Location: Taüll, Catalonia, Spain
- Coordinates: 42°31′03″N 0°50′55″E

Architecture
- Type: Church
- Style: Romanesque
- UNESCO World Heritage Site
- Official name: Catalan Romanesque Churches of the Vall de Boí
- Type: Cultural
- Criteria: ii, iv
- Designated: 2000 (24th session)
- Reference no.: 988
- Region: Europe and North America

Santa Maria de Taüll is a Romanesque church situated in the territory of Vall de Boí, a commune in the valley with the same name and Comarca of Alta Ribagorça in the north of Province of Lleida and the autonomous communities of Catalonia in Spain.

== History ==
Like Sant Climent, Taüll, Sant Joan de Boí, Santa Eulàlia d'Erill la Vall or Sant Feliu de Barruera, Maria is believed to have been built in the 11th century.

In November 2000, the church was included in the world heritage site of UNESCO with eight other Catalan Romanesque Churches of the Vall de Boí.

== Architecture ==
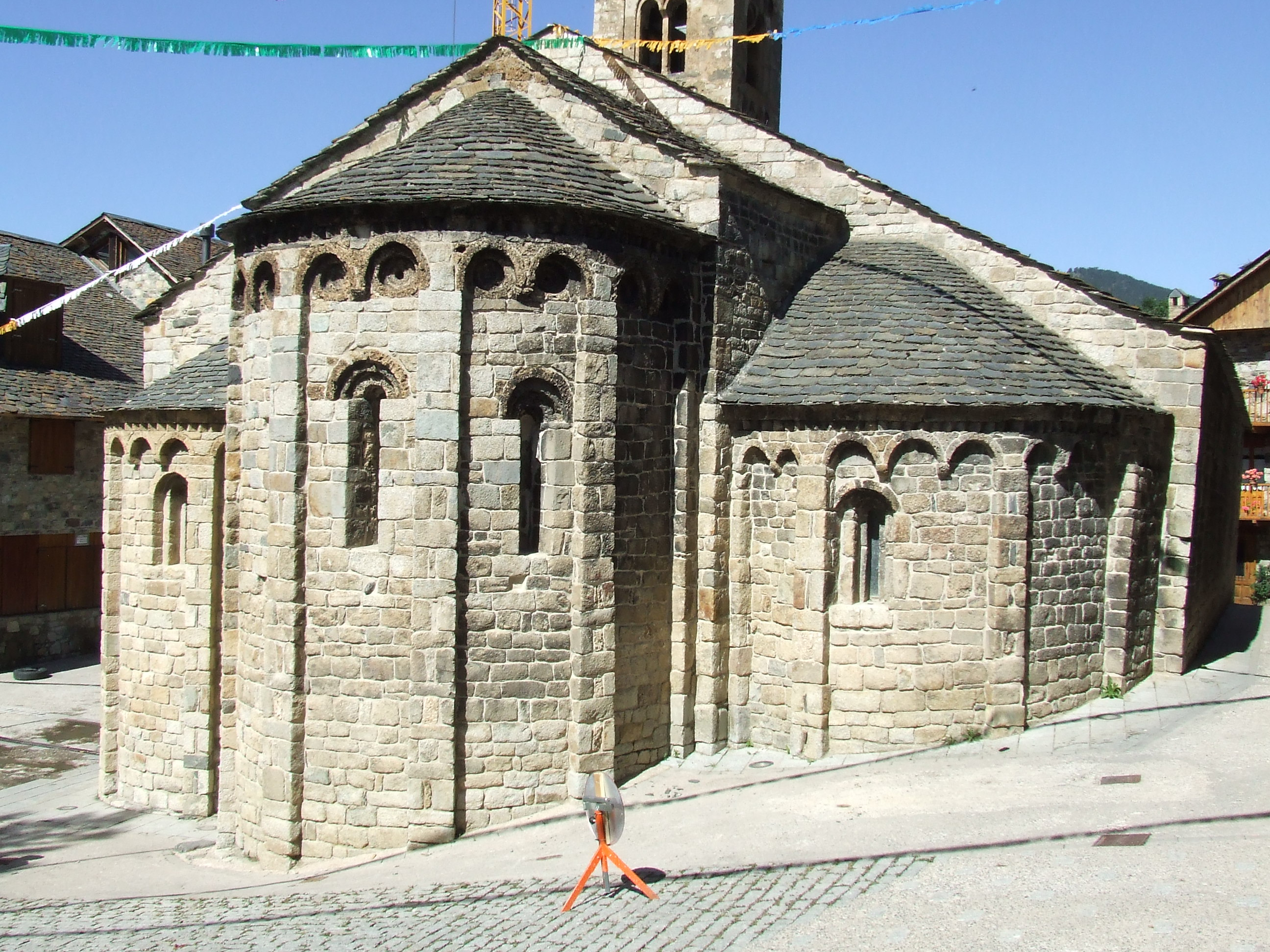
Chevet

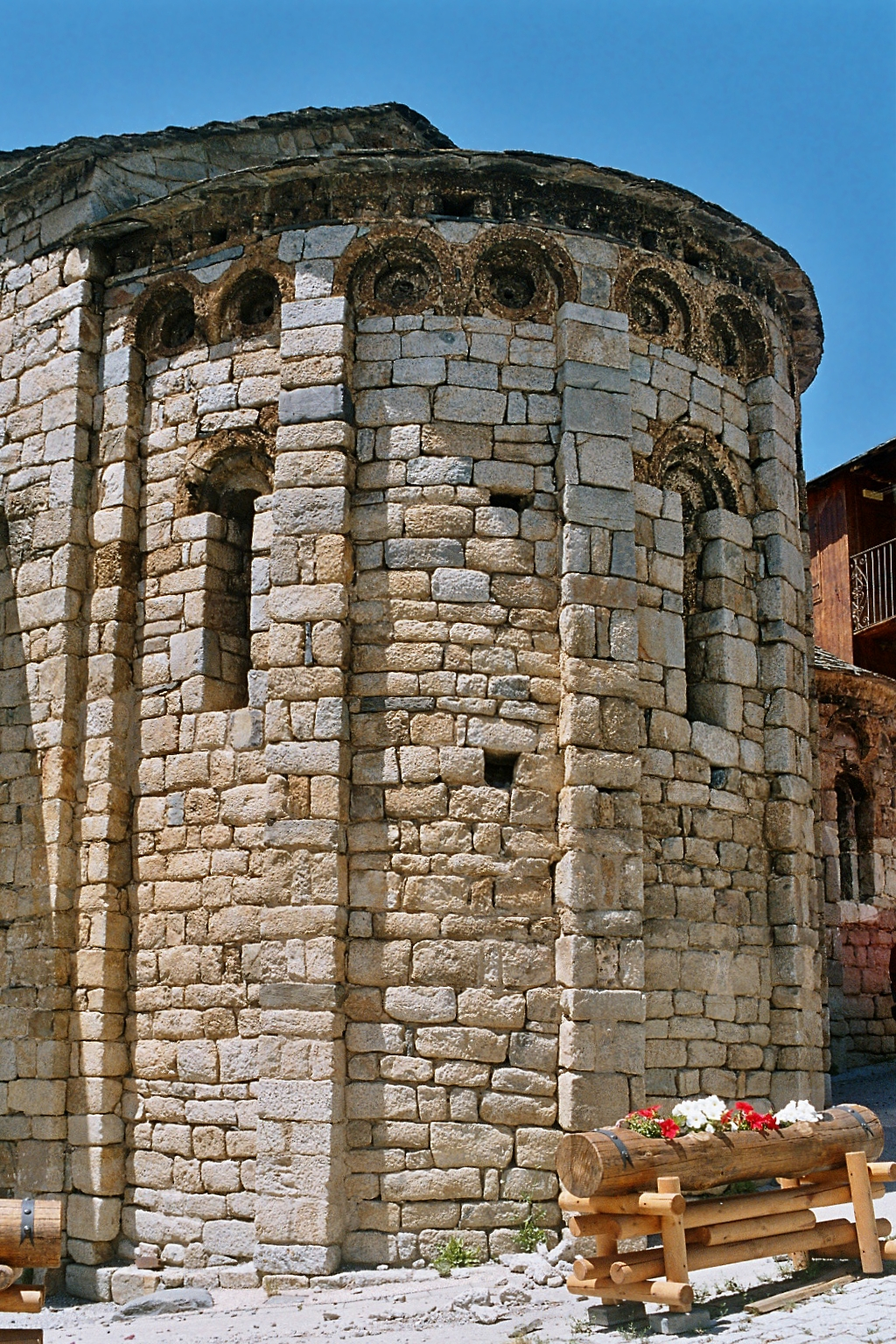
Apse

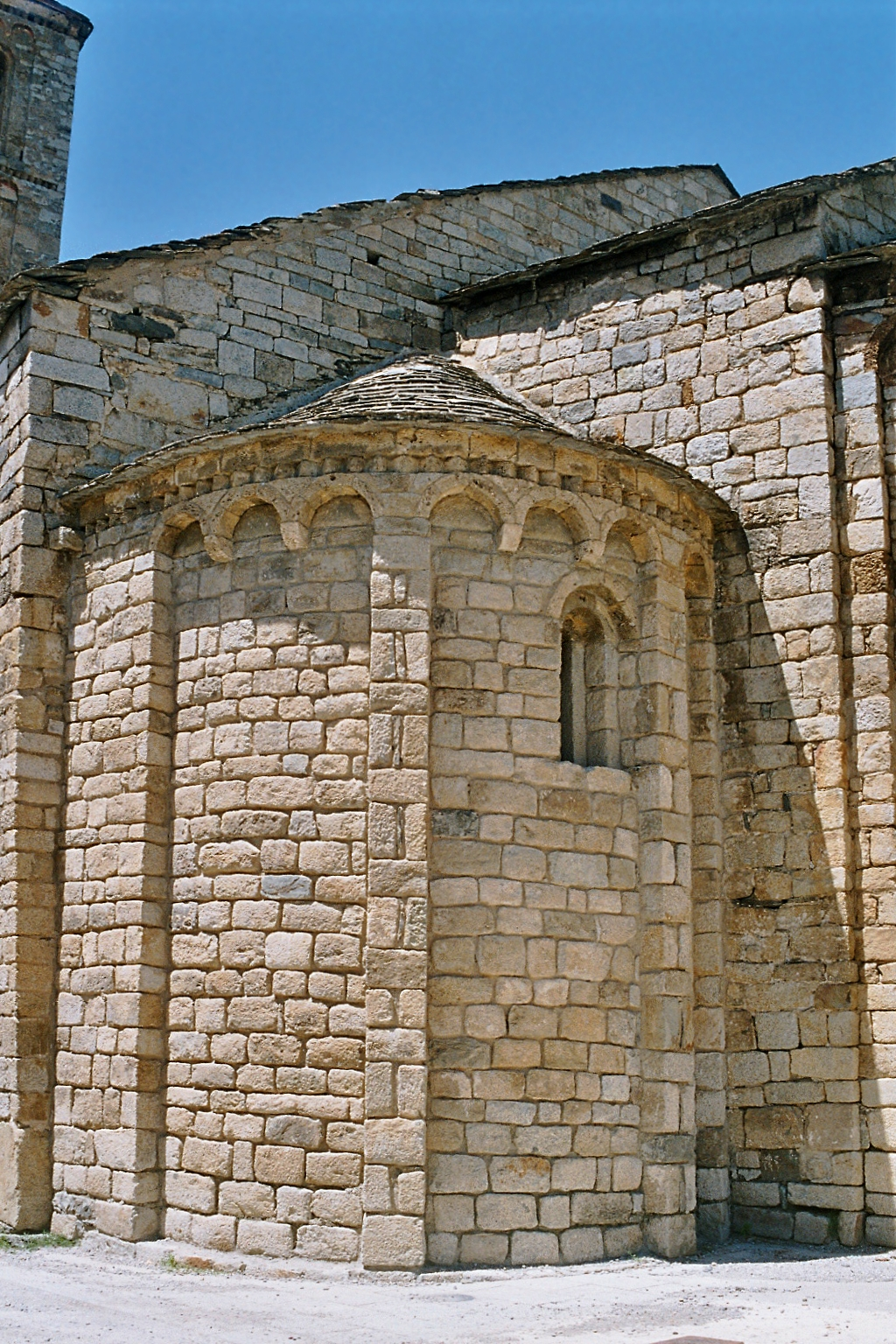
Left Apse

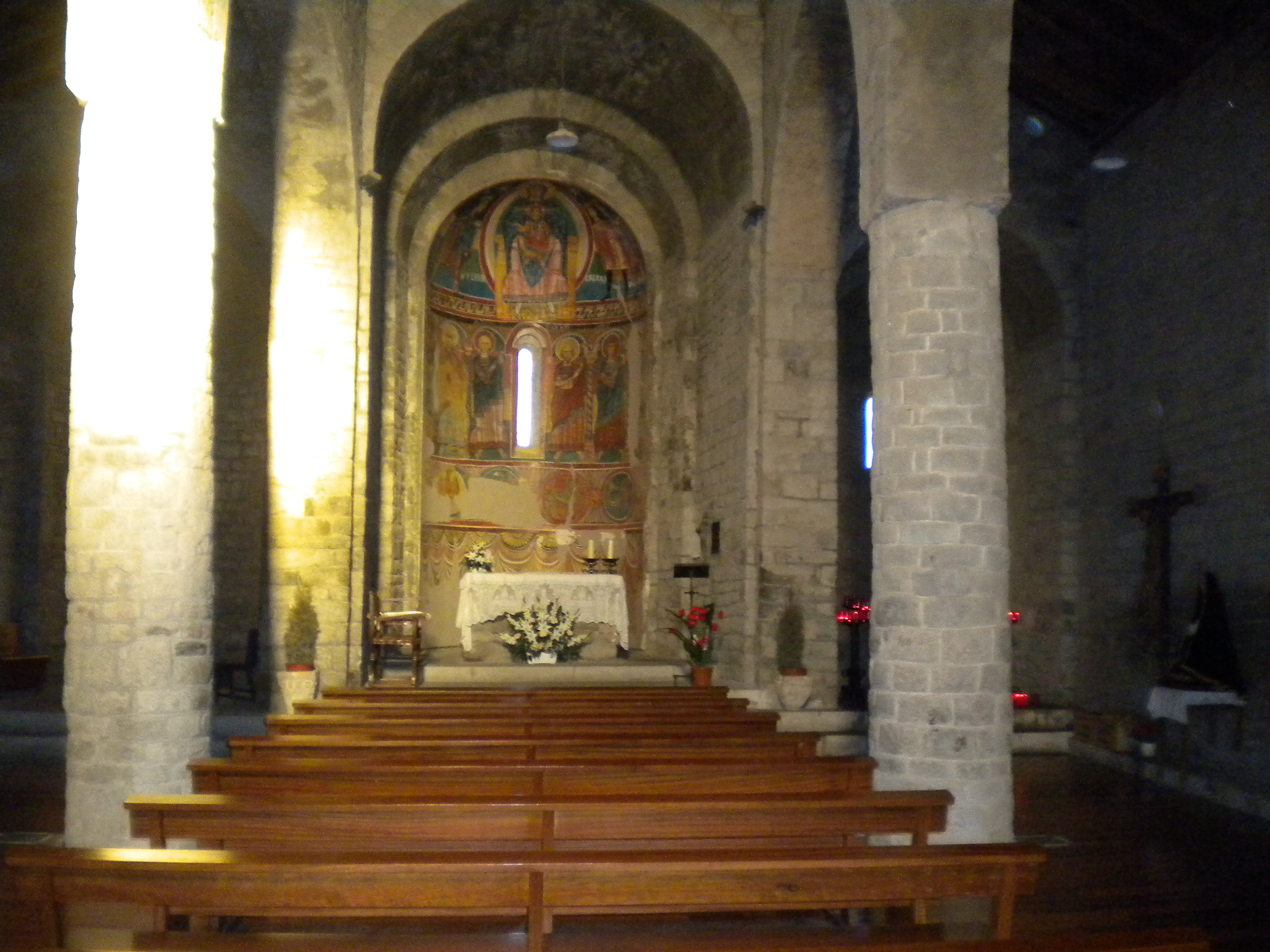
Nave

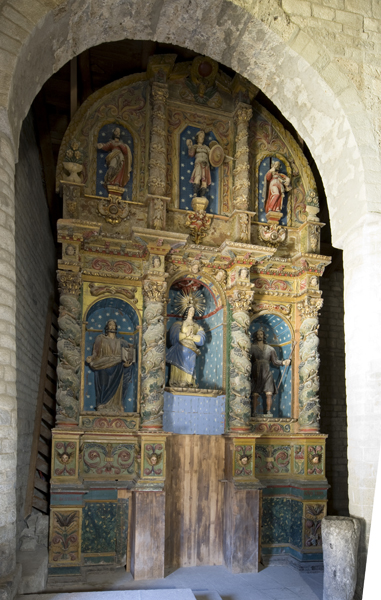
Reredos

== Wall Paintings ==
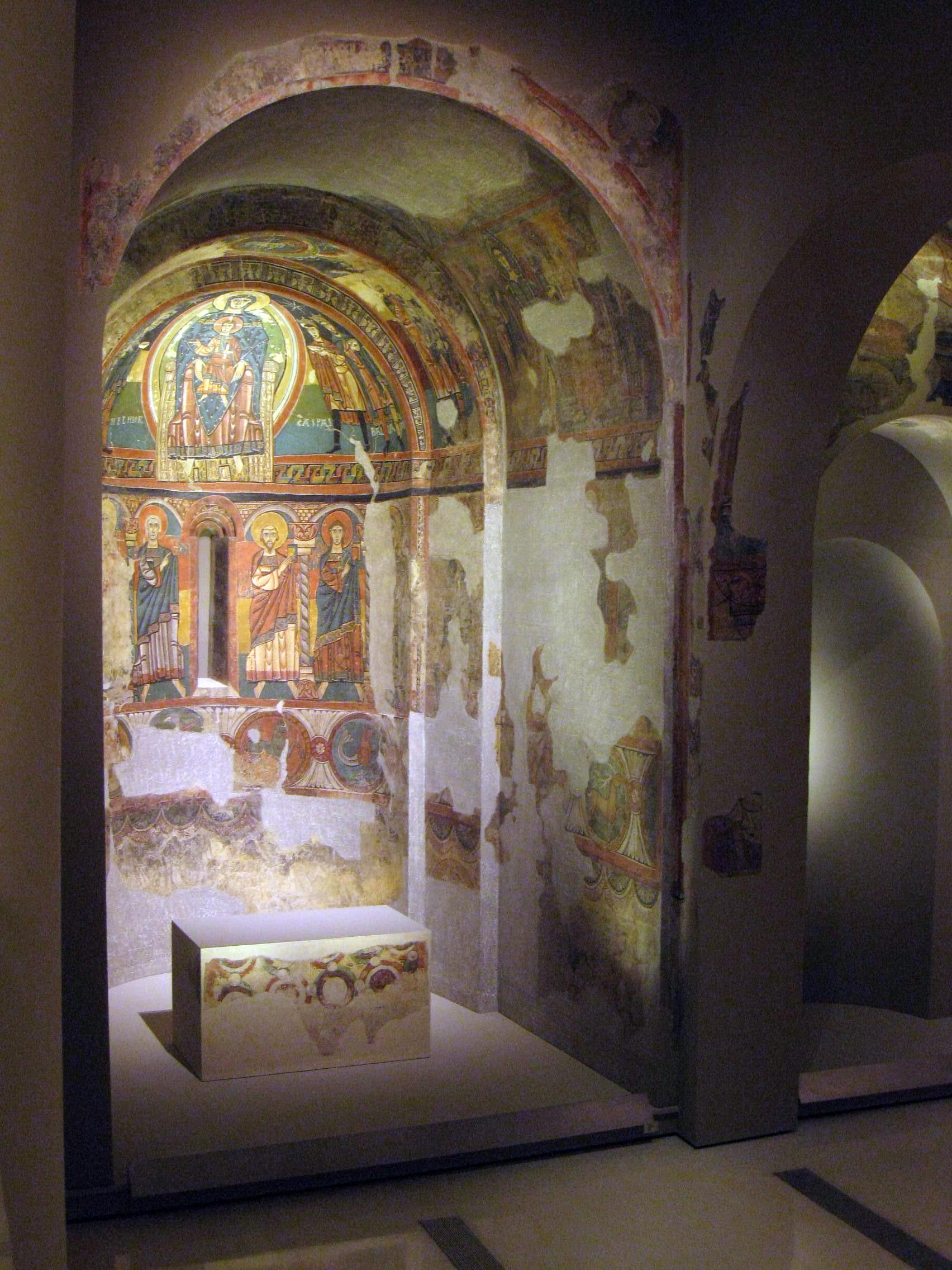
Original wall paintings, Museu Nacional d'Art de Catalunya, Barcelona

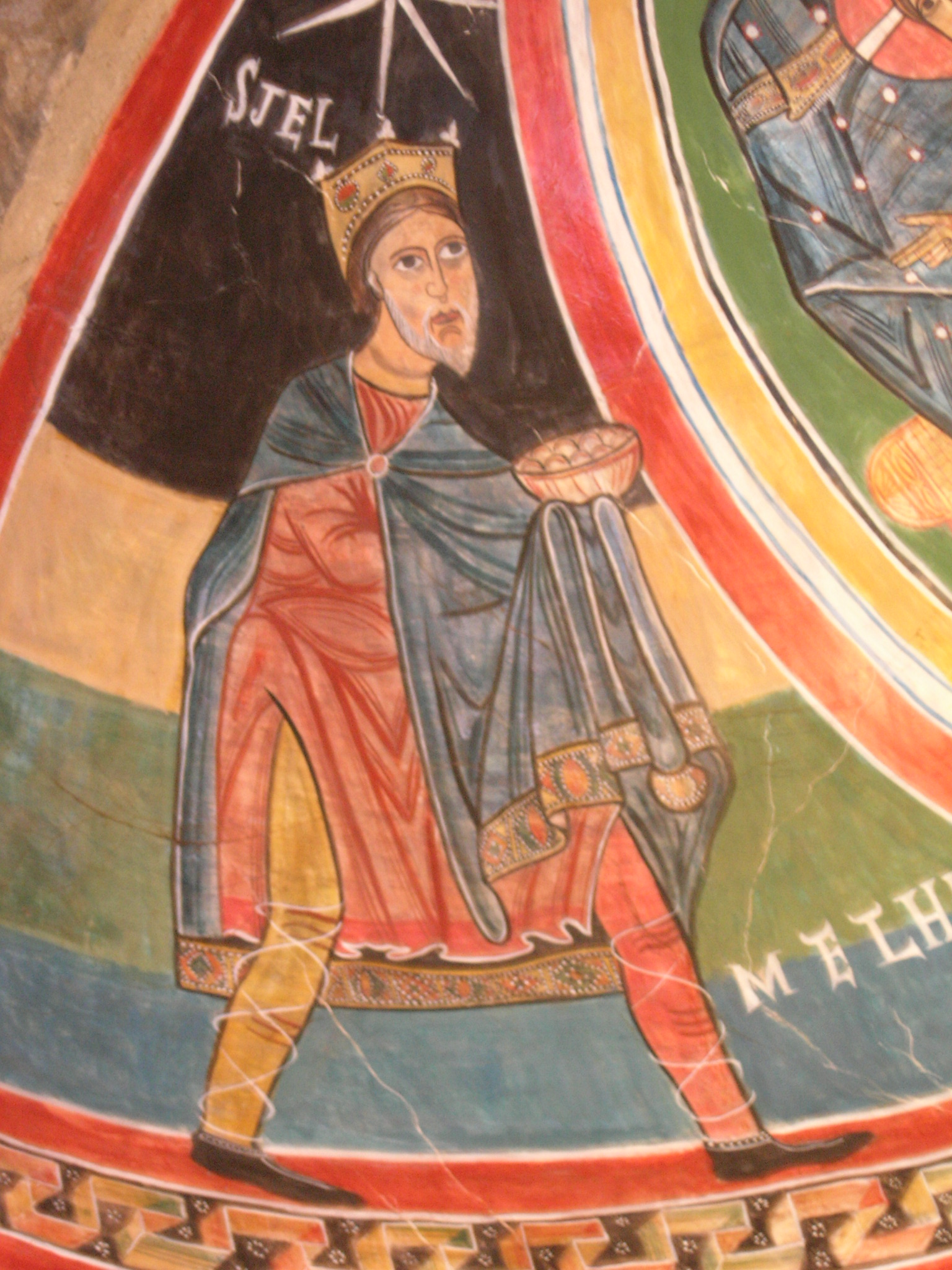
Melchior

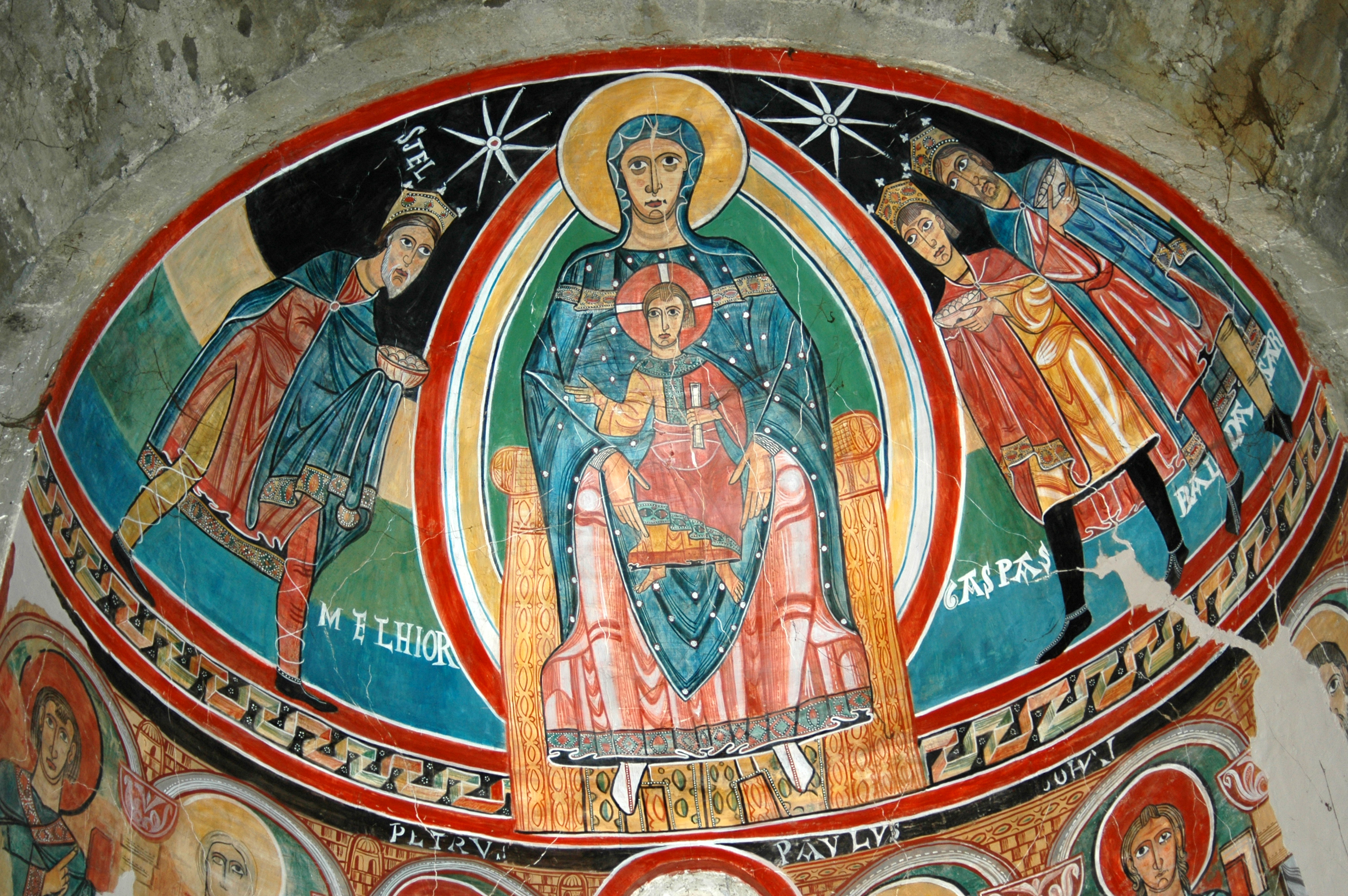
Adoration of the Magi and Mary, central apse

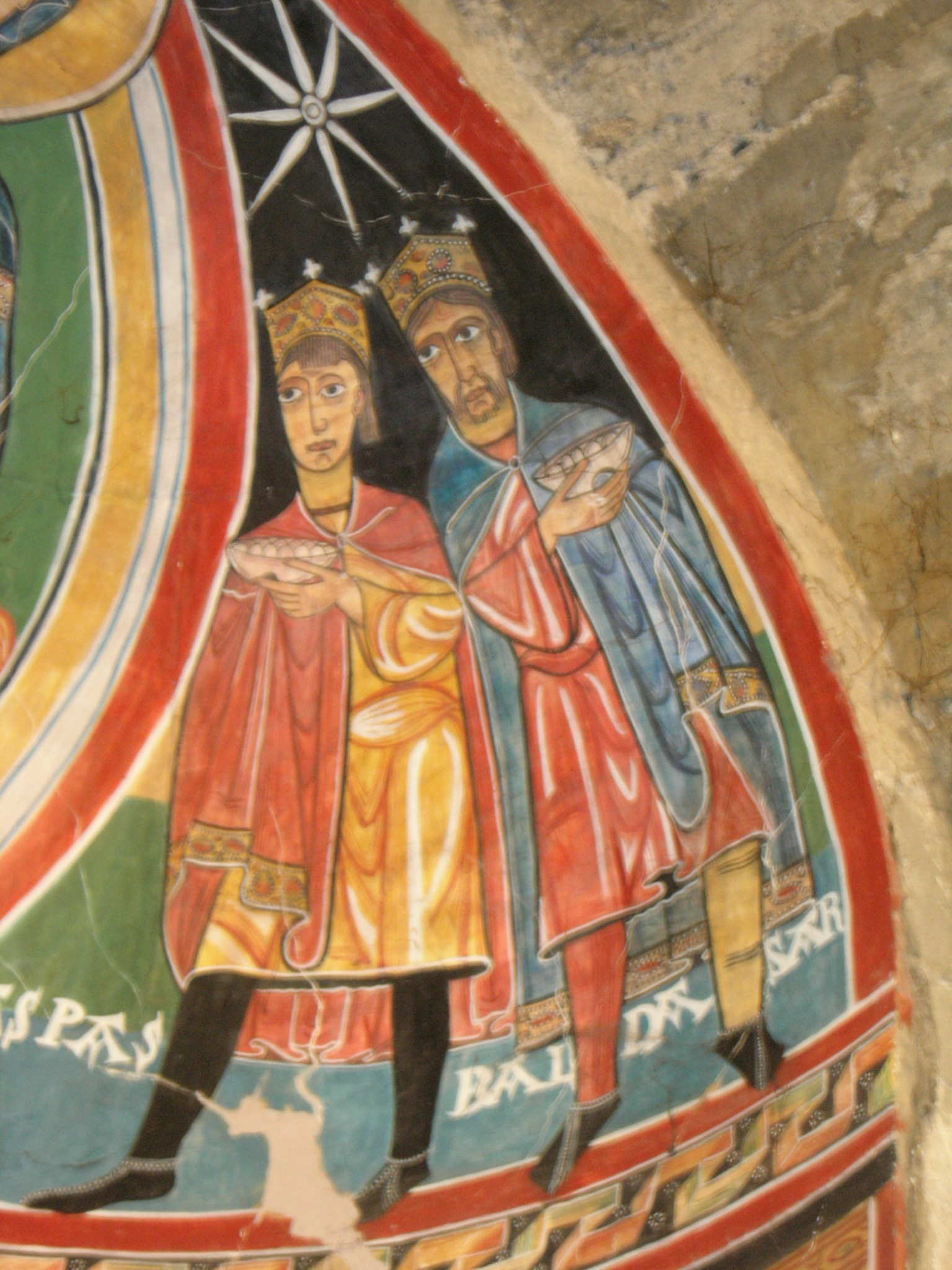
Gaspard and Balthazar

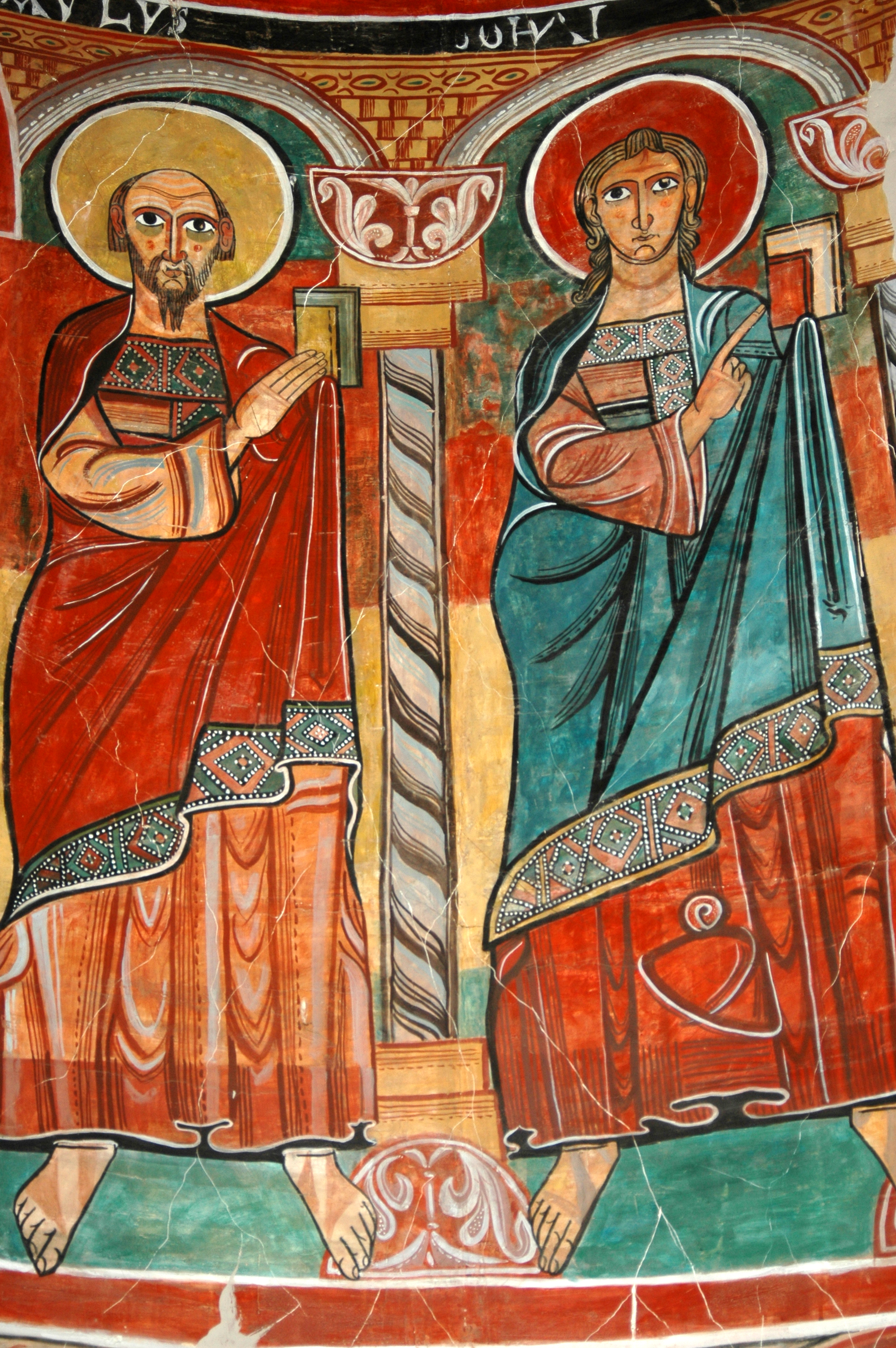
Apostles

== Antependium (Altar Frontal) ==
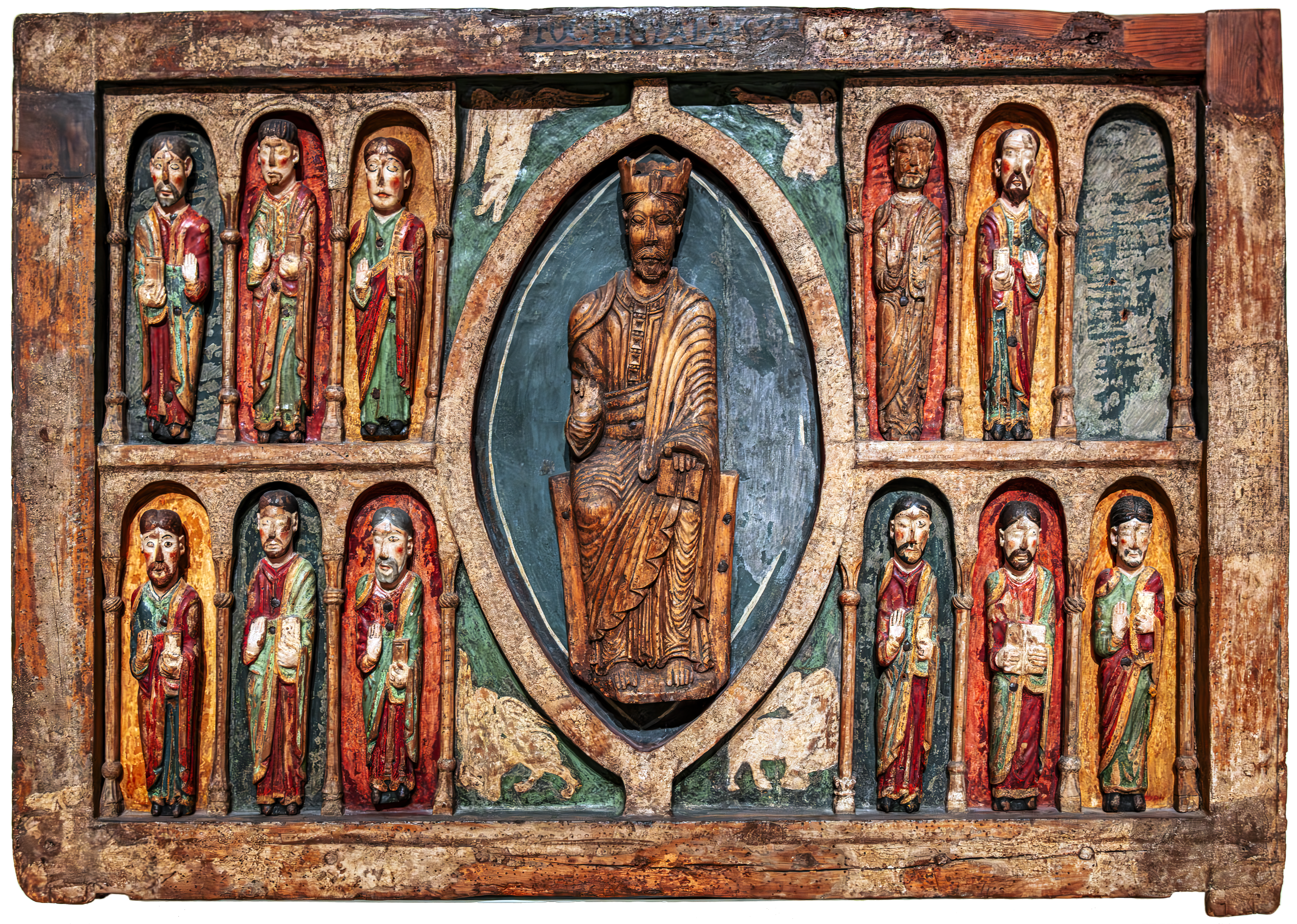
Antependium, MNAC, Barcelona
