= Saraís =

- Locality
- Location within Province of Lleida Location within Catalonia Location within Spain
- Coordinates: 42°28′38″N 0°47′25″E
- Country: Spain
- Community: Catalonia
- Province: Lleida
- Municipality: Vall de Boí
- Elevation: 1,340 m (4,400 ft)

Population
  - Total: 8

Saraís is a locality located in the municipality of Vall de Boí, in Province of Lleida province, Catalonia, Spain. As of 2020, it has a population of 8.
