= La Vall de Boí =

- Municipality
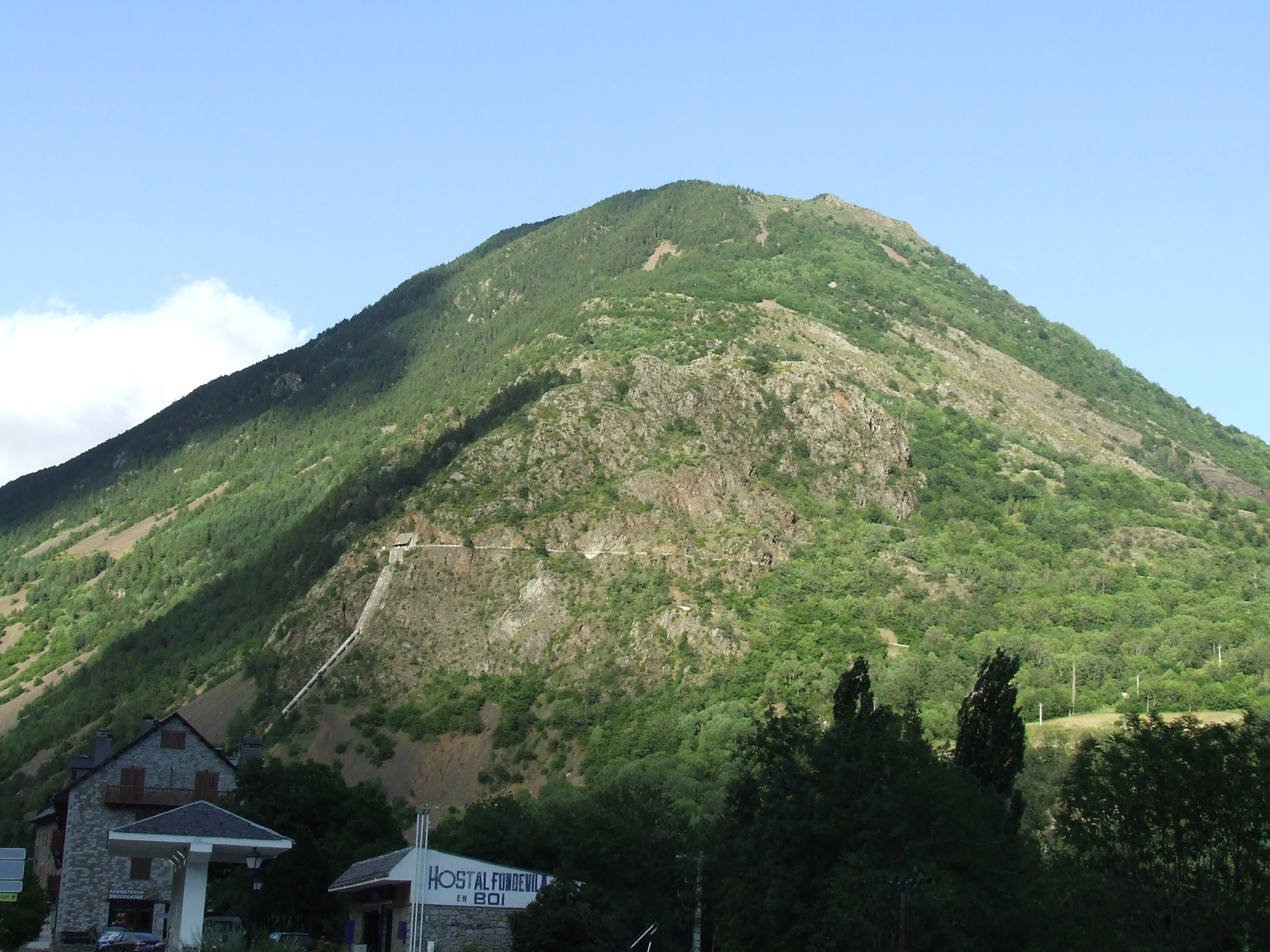
- Roca de la Feixa mountain seen from Barruera

- Location in Alta Ribagorça county

- Location within Catalonia Location within Spain
- Coordinates: 42°31′19.91″N 0°50′3.84″E
- Sovereign state: Spain
- Community: Catalonia
- Region: Alt Pirineu
- County: Alta Ribagorça
- Province: Lleida

Government
  - Mayor: Sònia Bruguera Diego (2019) (ERC-AM)

Area
  - Total: 219.5 km^{2} (84.7 sq mi)
- Elevation: 1,111 m (3,645 ft)

Population (2025-01-01)
  - Total: 1,122
  - Density: 5.112/km^{2} (13.24/sq mi)
- Postal code: 25526-25528
- Website: www.vallboi.cat

UNESCO World Heritage Site
- Official name: Catalan Romanesque Churches of the Vall de Boí
- Includes: 1. Eglésia de Sant Feliu; 2. Eglésia de Sant Joan de Boí; 3. Eglésia de Santa Maria (Taüll); 4. Eglésia de Sant Climent; 5. Eglésia de Santa Maria de l'Assumpció; 6. Eglésia de Santa Maria (Cardet); 7. Eglésia de la Nativitat; 8. Ermitage de Sant Quirc; 9. Eglésia de Santa Eulàlia
- Criteria: Cultural: (ii)(iv)
- Reference: 988
- Inscription: 2000 (24th Session)
- Area: 7.98 ha (19.7 acres)
- Buffer zone: 3,562 ha (8,800 acres)

La Vall de Boí (Western Catalan: [la ˈbaʎ ðe βoˈi], formerly known as Barruera) is a municipality and narrow, steep-sided valley in the Province of Lleida, Catalonia, Spain. It lies in the Alta Ribagorça county in the Alt Pirineu region, on the edges of the Pyrenees. It has a population of 1,122 (register office, 2025).

The valley is best known for its nine Early Romanesque churches, making it the site of the densest concentration of Romanesque architecture in Europe. It was designated as a World Heritage Site by UNESCO on 30 November 2000. The valley also includes the highest ski resort in the Pyrenees, at Boí-Taüll, and borders the Aigüestortes i Estany de Sant Maurici National Park which lies to the northeast.

== Villages ==
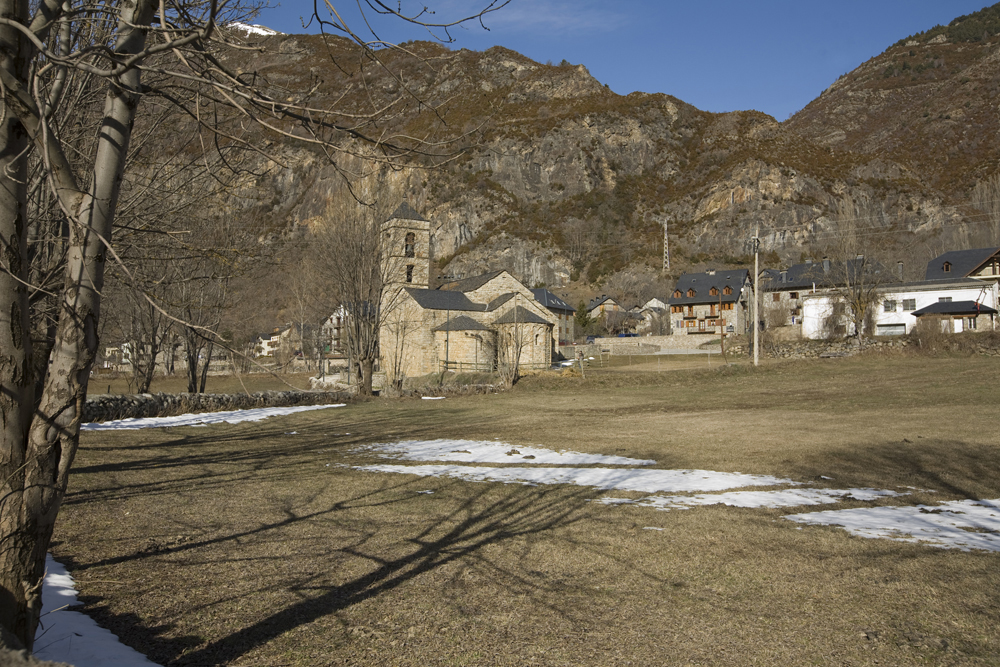
Barruera

- Barruera, 219
- Boí, 221
- Les Cabanasses, 6
- Caldes de Boí, 5
- Cardet, 12
- Cóll, 37
- Durro, 110
- Erill la Vall, 98
- Pla de l'Ermita, 133
- Saraís, 8
- Taüll, 273
- Other, 7

== History ==
The Moorish conquest of Spain did not penetrate the high valleys of the Pyrenees. The first Christian counties in the region were set out in the 9th century, in which the local counts paid little heed to their nominal Frankish overlords. The population was largely Basque.

The valley first belonged to the county of Toulouse, to which was joined the County of Ribagorza. In the 11th century, the valley came into the hands of the County of Pallars, before being annexed by the Kingdom of Aragón in the 12th century. As a result of its strategic position, the valley contains many castles, but they are mostly poorly preserved.

== Main sights ==
Although the valley had a relatively low population in the Middle Ages, large quantities of silver enriched the local dignitaries to encourage them to join the Catalan campaign to recover Barbastro and Zaragoza. Much of the wealth was spent on the construction of many churches from the 11th to the 14th centuries, in the new architectural style imported from Lombardy. The churches are characterized by elaborate stonework and elegant bell towers. Wall paintings from the churches are conserved at the National Museum of Art of Catalonia in Barcelona.

Many of the churches have remained in use for religious worship since they were constructed and consecrated in the 11th and 12th centuries. Nine churches were included in the World Heritage Site: Sant Climent and Santa Maria in Taüll, Sant Feliu in Barruera, Sant Joan in Boí, Santa Eulàlia in Erill la Vall, Santa Maria de l'Assumpció de Cóll, Santa Maria de Cardet, la Nativitat de la Mare de Déu in Durro, and the hermitage of Sant Quirc near Durro.

The valley also contains the ruins of a number of other Romanesque religious buildings, including the churches of Sant Llorenç in Saraís and Santa Martí in Taüll, and the hermitages of Sant Cristòfol in Erill, of Sant Quirc in Taüll, of Sant Salvador in Barruera and of Sant Pere in Boí.

=== Sant Climent, Taüll ===
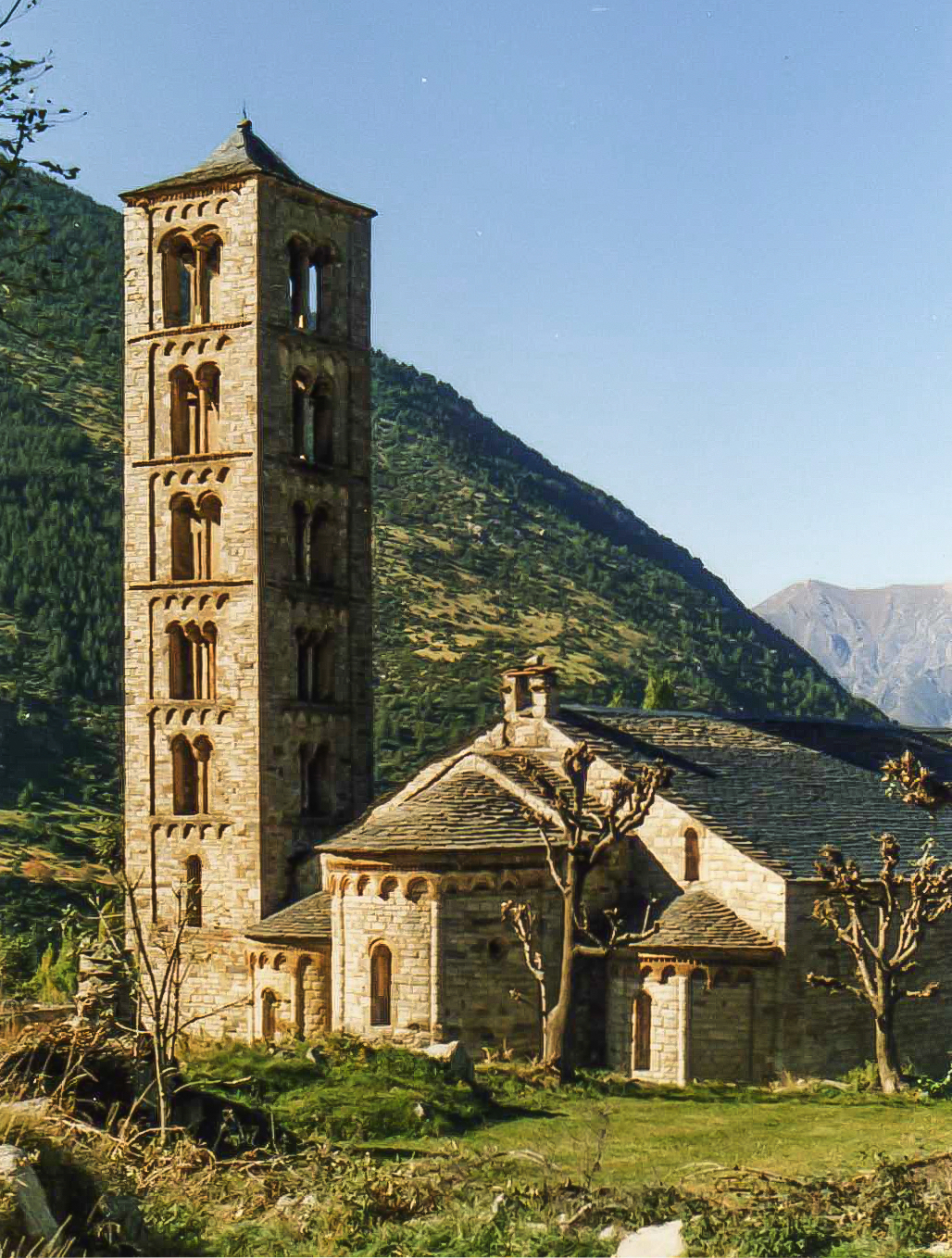
Sant Climent in Taüll.

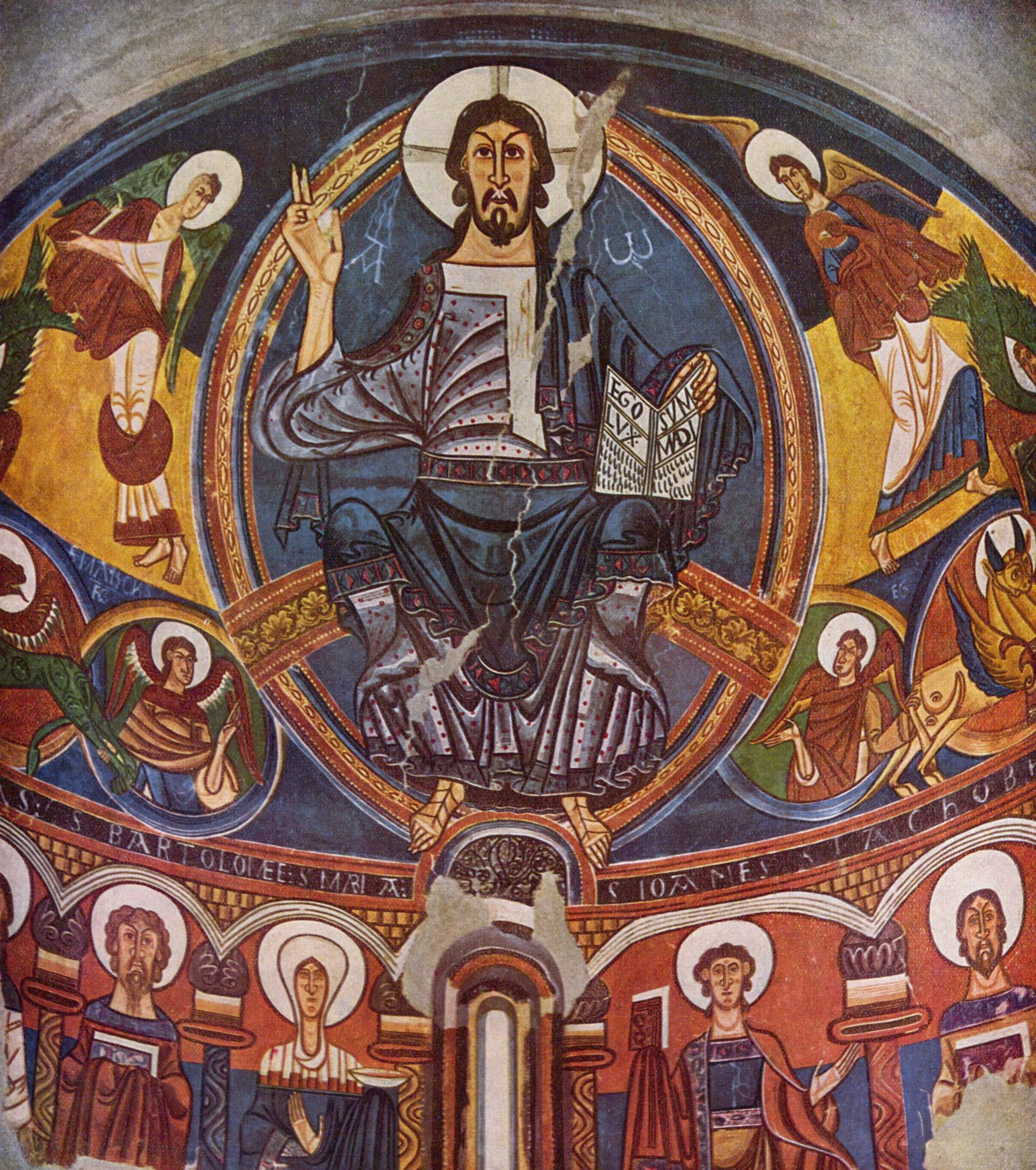
Fresco of Christ Pantocrator from Sant Climent de Taüll, acknowledged as one of the masterpieces of Romanesque art

The church of Sant Climent de Taüll was consecrated on 10 December 1123 by the bishop of Roda. It is situated on a slight rise beside the road from Taüll and to Boí. It is the largest and best-preserved church in the Vall de Boí, and also the most architecturally outstanding

The church is laid out as a basilica, with three naves, each separated by an arcade of columns and ending in a semicircular apse. It retains its original double-pitched timber roof. To the southeast of the body of the church stands a six-storey bell tower, with arched windows on each floor. The building is constructed from granite blocks, with decorative elements and windows in pumice. The facades are decorated with friezes and pilasters.

The image of Christ Pantocrator from the church, originally in the main apse and now conserved in the National Art Museum of Catalonia (MNAC), is acknowledged as one of the masterpieces of Romanesque art.

=== Santa Maria, Taüll ===
The church of Santa Maria is located in the village of Taüll, and was consecrated on 11 December 1123, the day after the church of Sant Climent. It was also built with three naves, each ending with an apse. The bell tower rises from the within the southern nave. The quality of the stonework of the bell tower is lower than the rest of the church, and it may have been built earlier, with the church added around it.

The church was heavily renovated in the 18th century, with a dome added. Its frescoes were moved to MNAC in around 1918. Many 18th-century renovations were removed in the 1970s, including the dome.

=== Sant Feliu, Barruera ===
The church of Sant Feliu is situated slightly to the north of Barruera. The village lies at a strategic point where the valley widens out and was connected with a nearby abbey in the Middle Ages which has now disappeared. The church has a single surviving nave of the three originally built, with a barrel vault and a semicircular apse. It has a square transept and apse to the south and square chapel to the north. A simple, undecorated bell tower lies at the southeast corner. Renovations were undertaken in the 16th century, adding two Gothic chapels to the main nave, and a Gothic western facade.

=== Sant Joan de Boí ===
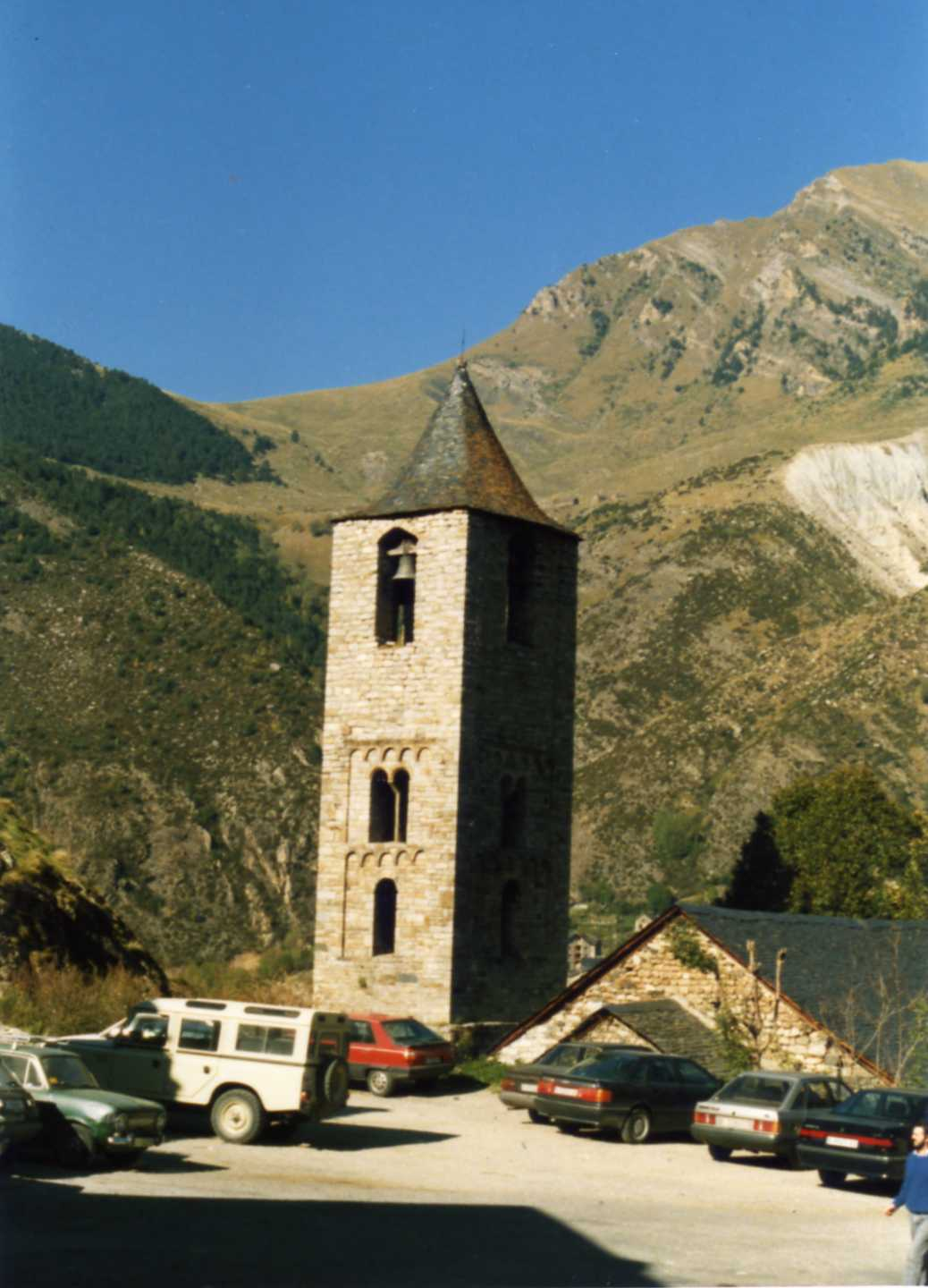
Bell tower of Sant Joan in Boí.

The church of Sant Joan is situated at the entrance to the village of Boí which gives its name to the valley. The church has three naves, with apses at the eastern ends of the two side names. The original timber roof has been replaced with stone. The bell tower rises to the south of the southern nave. The church was heavily renovated in the 18th century, but many of the renovations were removed in the 1960s. Its paintings were removed in 1919 and taken to MNAC.

=== Santa Eulàlia, Erill-la-Vall ===
The church of Santa Eulàlia in Erill-la-Vall has a single long nave with a triple apse at the eastern end and an entrance to the north opening onto a covered walkway. A timber roof has replaced the former barrel vault. The six-storey bell tower rises to the north to 23 metres. It has an important Descent from the Cross, the Erill la Vall Descent from the Cross

=== Santa Maria de l'Assumpció, Cóll ===
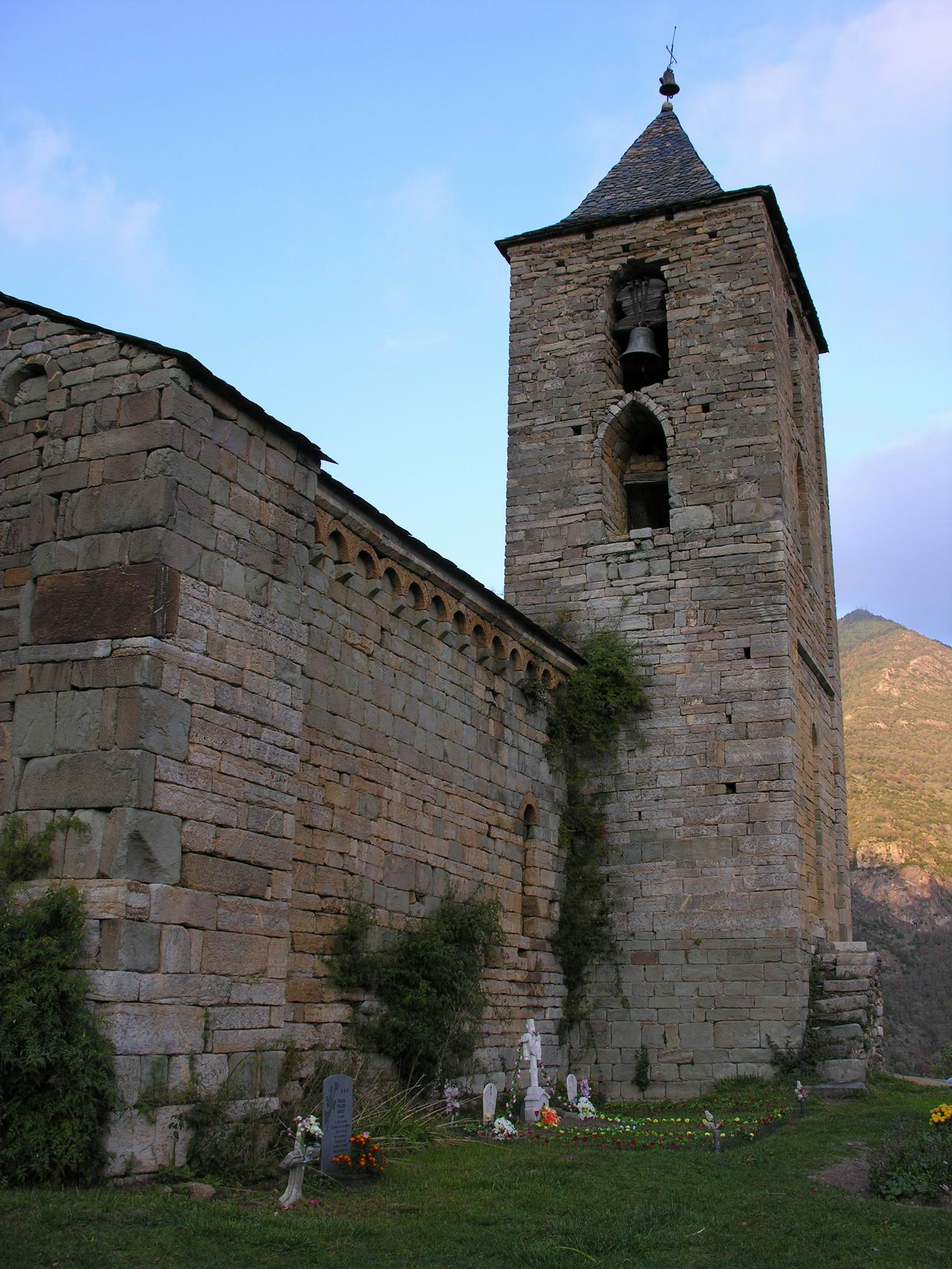
The church of Santa Maria de l'Assumpció in Cóll.

The church of the Assumption lies outside the village of Cóll. It was built with a single nave with apse and barrel vault, and consecrated in 1110, and has later Gothic additions. A side-chapel to the north and a later Gothic bell-tower with two storeys to the south create a cruciform floor plan. The interior is lit by oculuses at east and west ends, with the door to the west. The bell tower is in poor repair.

=== Santa Maria, Cardet ===
Cardet occupied a rocky outcrop at the entrance to the valley. The church is at the eastern edge of the village, above a steep slope. The church has a single nave with apse, with a crypt below the apse (required due to the falling ground level). A sacristy was added to the southeast end of the nave, and a chapel was added to the north facade. The exterior retains features from the 11th century, and of renovations in the 12th, 13th, 17th and 18th centuries. The interior retains a Baroque appearance from later renovations.

=== Nativitat de la Mare de Déu, Durro ===
The small town of Durro is situated at an elevation of 1,386 metres, on a south-facing mountainside. The church has a single long and narrow nave with a barrel vault and slate roof. It was built with a single apse, now replaced by a sacristy. Two square chapels have been built into the northern wall, and the bell tower rises from the northeast corner to five storeys. The entrance is cut into the southern wall, to a covered walkway. The building has been renovated and extended many times since it was built in the 12th century and little of its original appearance remains. The interior retains Baroque features from later renovations.

The church was restored in 1983, and the bell tower in 1994.

=== Ermita de Sant Quirc, Durro ===
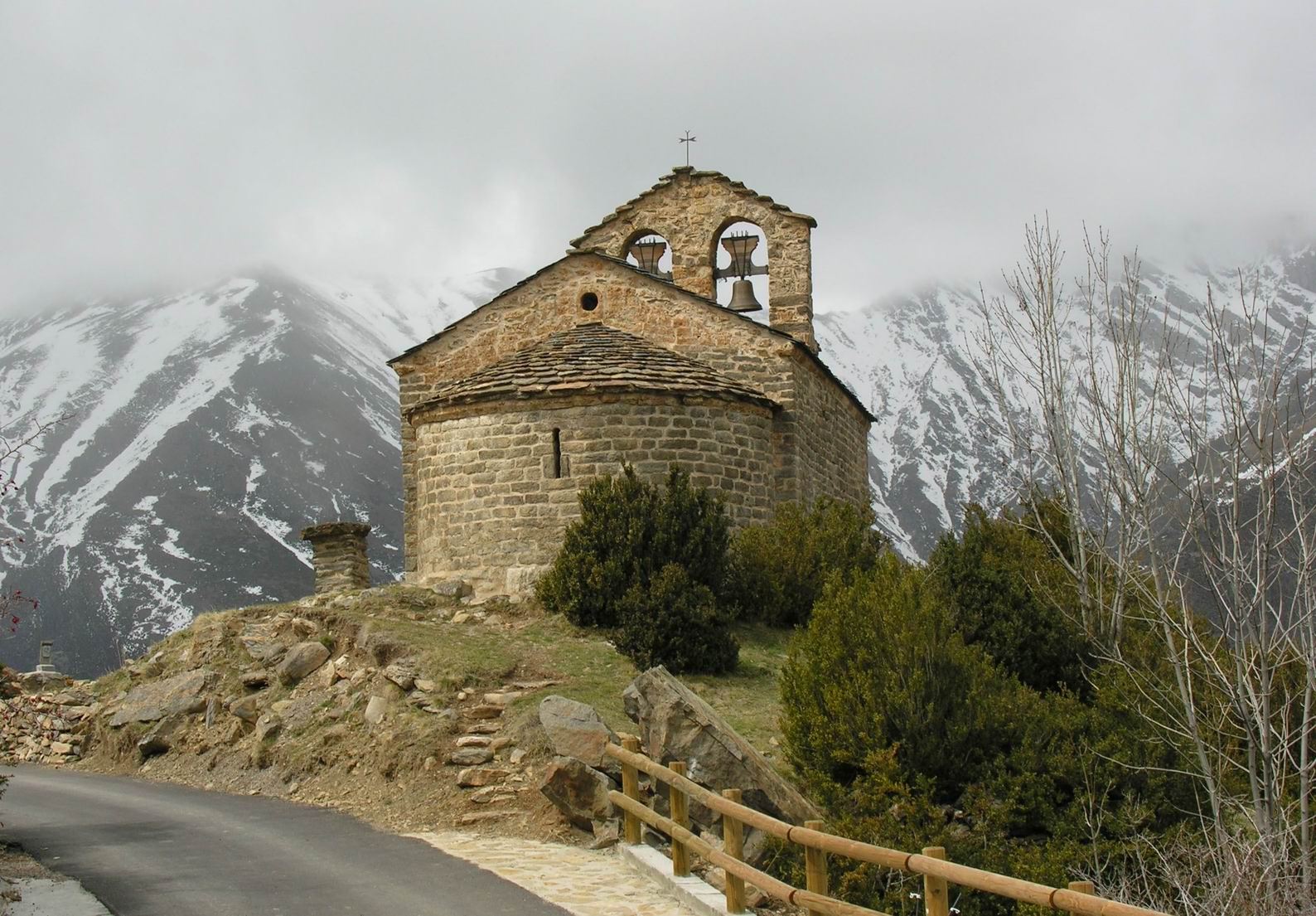
Sant Quirc de Durro

The small hermitage of Sant Quirc is situated on a rocky outcrop close to Durro. It has a small nave and apse, with an entrance to the south. A short belfry rises at the west end. The roof-space (accessed from the outside) may have been used as a granary.

== See also ==
- Catalan Romanesque Churches of the Vall de Boí
