= Erill la Vall =

- Locality
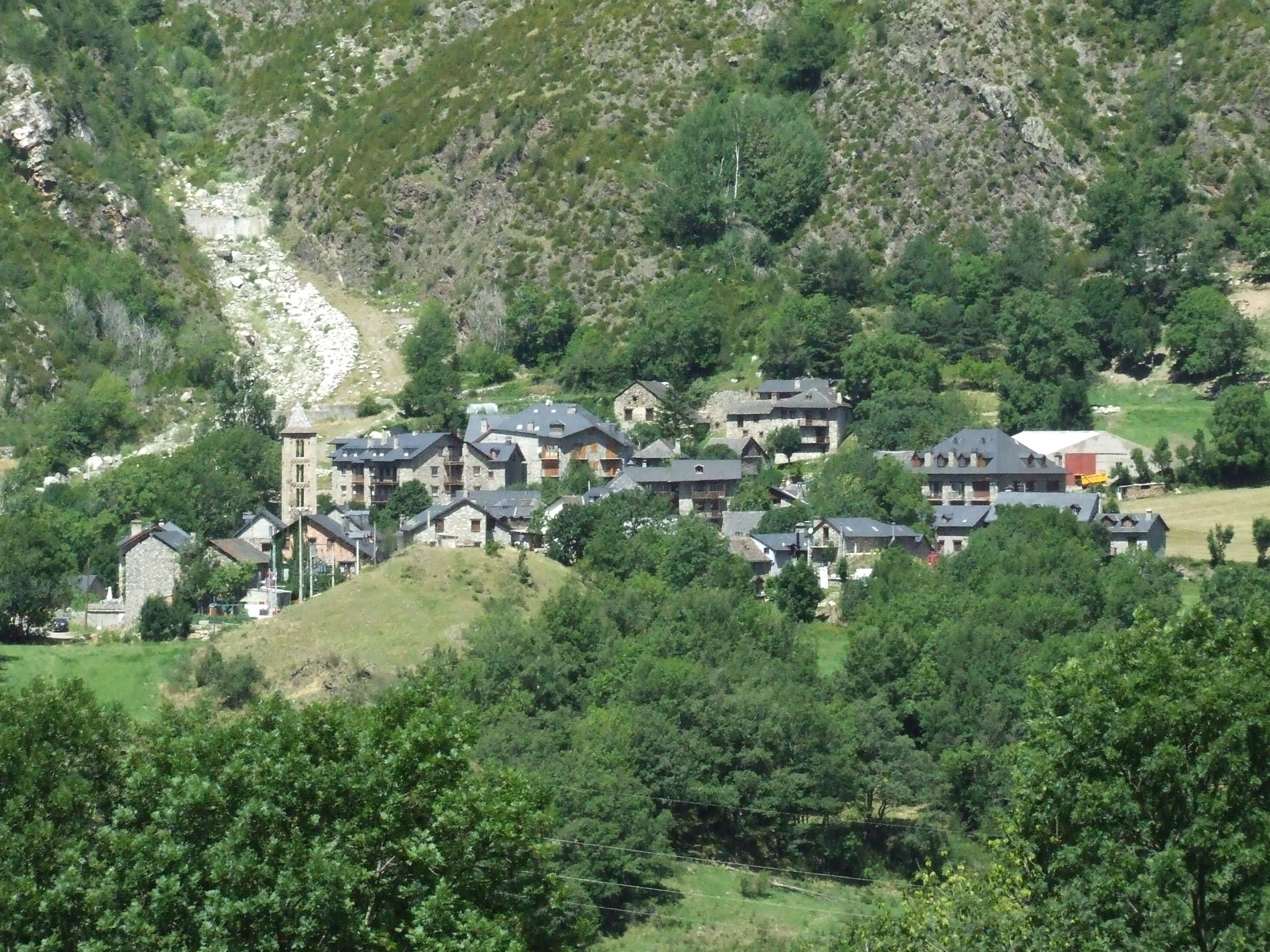

- Location within Province of Lleida Location within Catalonia Location within Spain
- Coordinates: 42°31′32″N 0°49′30″E
- Country: Spain
- Community: Catalonia
- Province: Lleida
- Municipality: Vall de Boí
- Elevation: 1,247 m (4,091 ft)

Population
  - Total: 97

Erill la Vall is a locality situated in the municipality of Vall de Boí, in Province of Lleida province, Catalonia, Spain. As of 2020, it has a population of 97.

== Geography ==
Erill la Vall is located 139km north of Lleida.
