= Boí Taüll Resort =

Ski resort in Catalonia, Spain

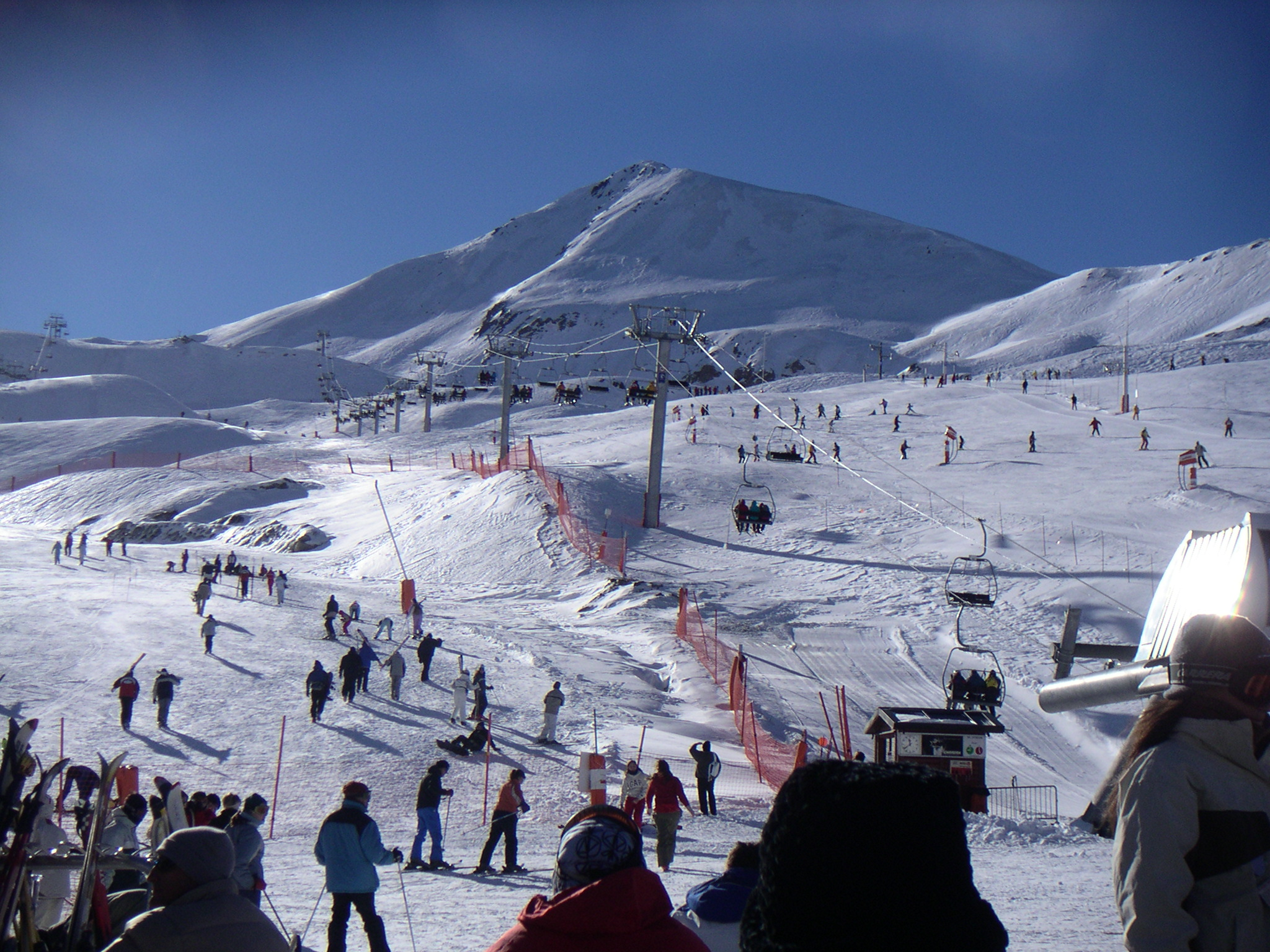

- Location within Spain Location within Catalonia Location within Pyrenees
- Location: Vall de Boí, Catalonia (Spain)
- Nearest city: Vall de Boí
- Coordinates: 42°28′40″N 0°52′15″E
- Top elevation: 2,751 metres (9,026 ft)
- Base elevation: 2,020 metres (6,630 ft)
- Trails: Black: 9 Red: 26; Blue: 7 Green: 10; 52 Total (45km)
- Lift system: 9 Total
- Lift capacity: 13,520 skiers an hour
- Website: website

Boí Taüll Resort (Catalan pronunciation: [buˈi təˈuʎ]) is a ski resort located in the heart of the Pyrenees, in the Vall de Boí, Catalonia (Spain), opened in 1988. The ski area extends from 2,020 to 2,751 metres (6,627 to 9,026 ft).

The ski resort comprises only the small Mulleres Valley, although future expansion is planned for the Valley Manyanet. The service centres and parking are placed in the Pla de les Vaques (2,020 m). From there leave 4 chairlifts, 1 platter lift, and 3 carpets. From the top, in the Puig Falcó (2,751 m), you can see impressive views of Pallars Jussà and Pic of the Orri in the neighbouring ski resort of Port Ainé. Is the highest point of the resort, and all ski resorts in the Catalan Pyrenees, and borders the peripheral zone of Aigüestortes i Estany de Sant Maurici National Park.
