= Sant Sebastià del Sull =

Ruined Benedictine monastery in Saldes, Berguedà comarca, Catalonia, Spain

Coordinates: 42.242661°N 1.759628°E

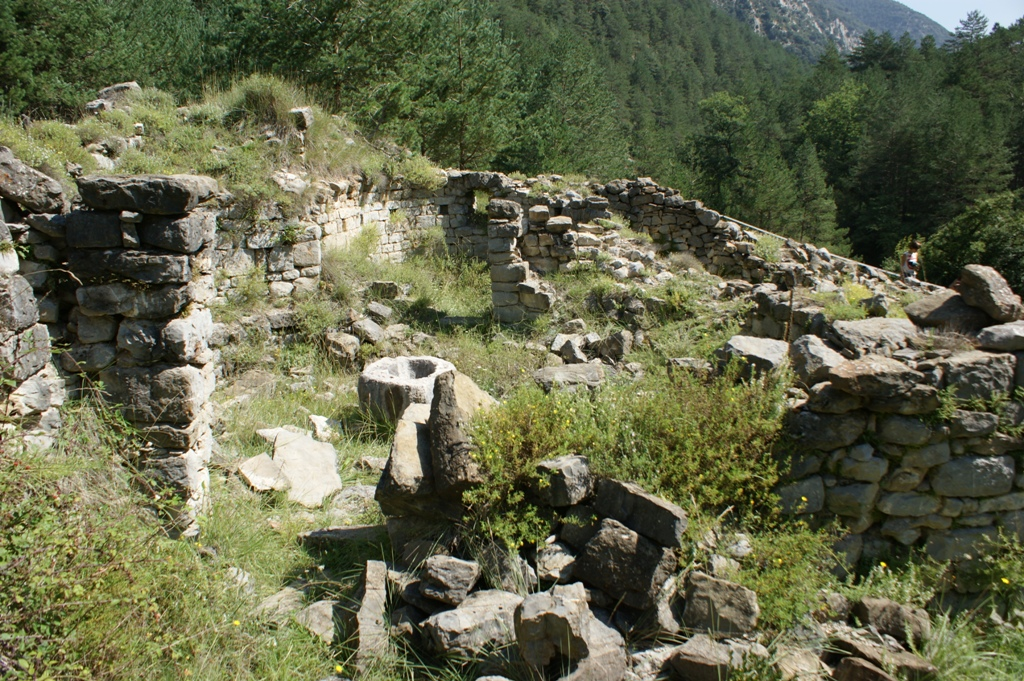
Sant Sebastià del Sull

Sant Sebastià del Sull is a ruined Benedictine monastery in Saldes, Berguedà comarca, Catalonia, Spain. Originally constructed in the 9th century in Romanesque style, the building was renovated several times. After it collapsed, it was rebuilt in the 15th century. Now in ruins, Dr. Manuel Riu Riu, made several excavations between 1971–77, which served to expose unique building architecture and important Catalan Romanesque necropolis.

== History ==
The monastery was founded by Father Daniel and devotee Honesta in the early 10th century. They received the land for the formation of the monastery before the year 939. In that year, Sunifred II of Cerdanya gave the land which then helped form a religious community with an abbot and six monks. Although the monastery increased its assets in 965, by the year 983, Count Cabreta Oliva gave the monastery Sant Llorenç prop Bagà. Monks no longer resided at the monastery by the mid-11th century.

== Architecture ==
Building diagram

The building has a round centralized midsection covered with a dome and a semicircular apse on the eastern side. The church door is opposite the apse. Constructed of small blocks, they were left unpolished. The blocks are arranged in rows and joined with mortar. It is believed that the structure was covered with a dome made of small blocks, arranged concentrically. The base of the walls is thick, with a bench that went around the entire structure, including the apse. At the back of the apse exists a loophole window.
