= Santa Maria, Amer =

Benedictine monastery in Amer, Selva, Catalonia, Spain

Coordinates: 42.01°N 2.601944°E

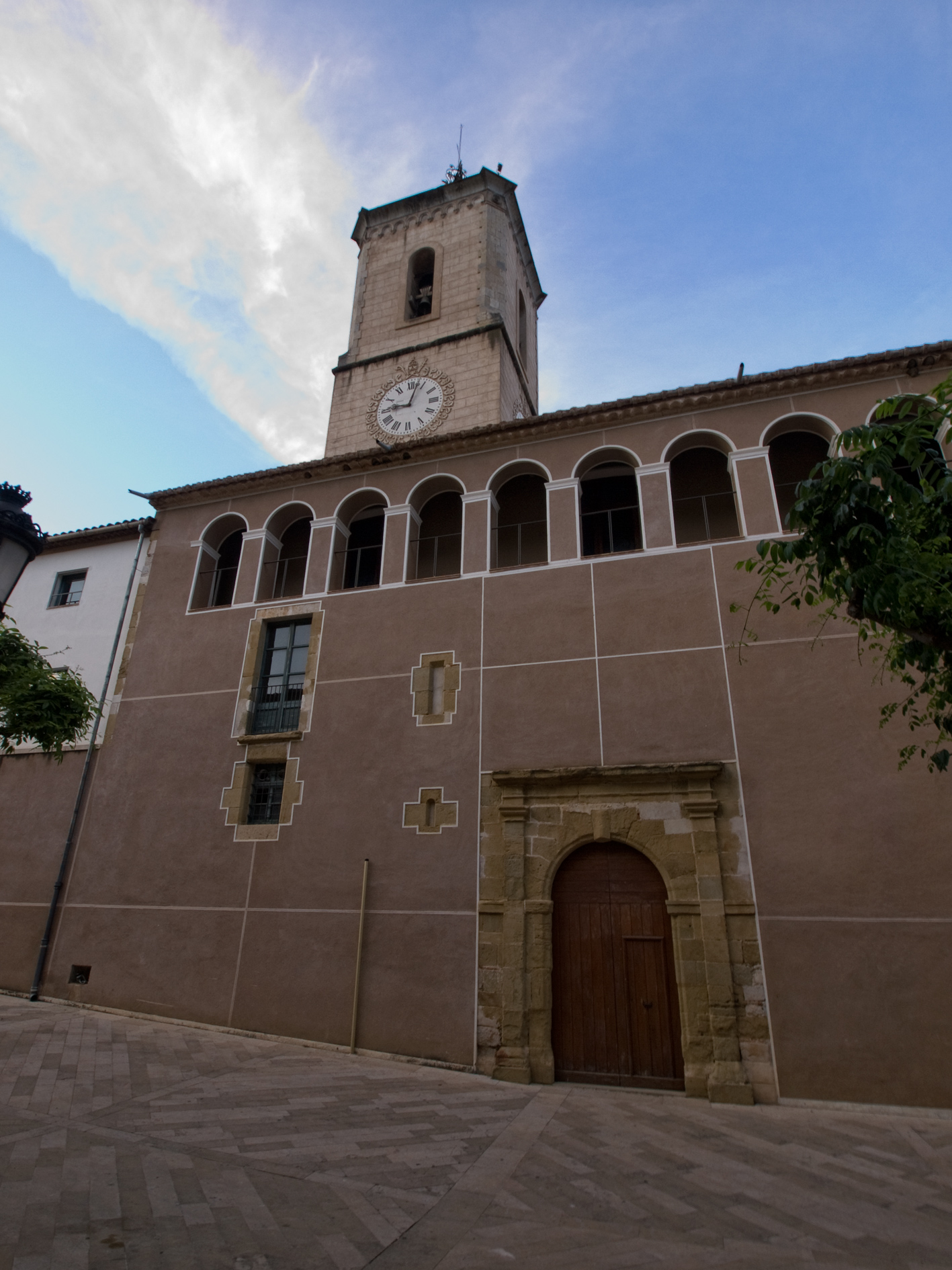
Santa Maria d'Amer

Santa Maria d'Amer is a Benedictine monastery in Amer, Selva, Catalonia, Spain.

== History ==
The monastery was founded in 820 by the abbot Deodat and initially was devoted to Saint Medir and Saint Genís. King Louis the Pious granted an immunity provision to the monastery which was confirmed by Charles the Bald in 844 and in 860. In 949, it moved to a new location within Amer. Rebuilt and consecrated, it was dedicated to St. Mary.

The monastery gained in importance and grew in assets in the following centuries. Although he was linked with the Roman Catholic Diocese of Girona, during the 11th and 12th centuries, it remained independent. In the 12th century, it was amended again and the priory church of Santa Maria de Cóll was founded. In 1381, the jurisdiction of the Amer religious community was left to the monastery. In 1445, it was associated for a brief period with the monastery of Sant Pere de Galligants. In 1592, by papal order, it was attached to the monastery of Santa Maria de Roses, a union that lasted until the demise of the monastic life.

== Architecture and fittings ==
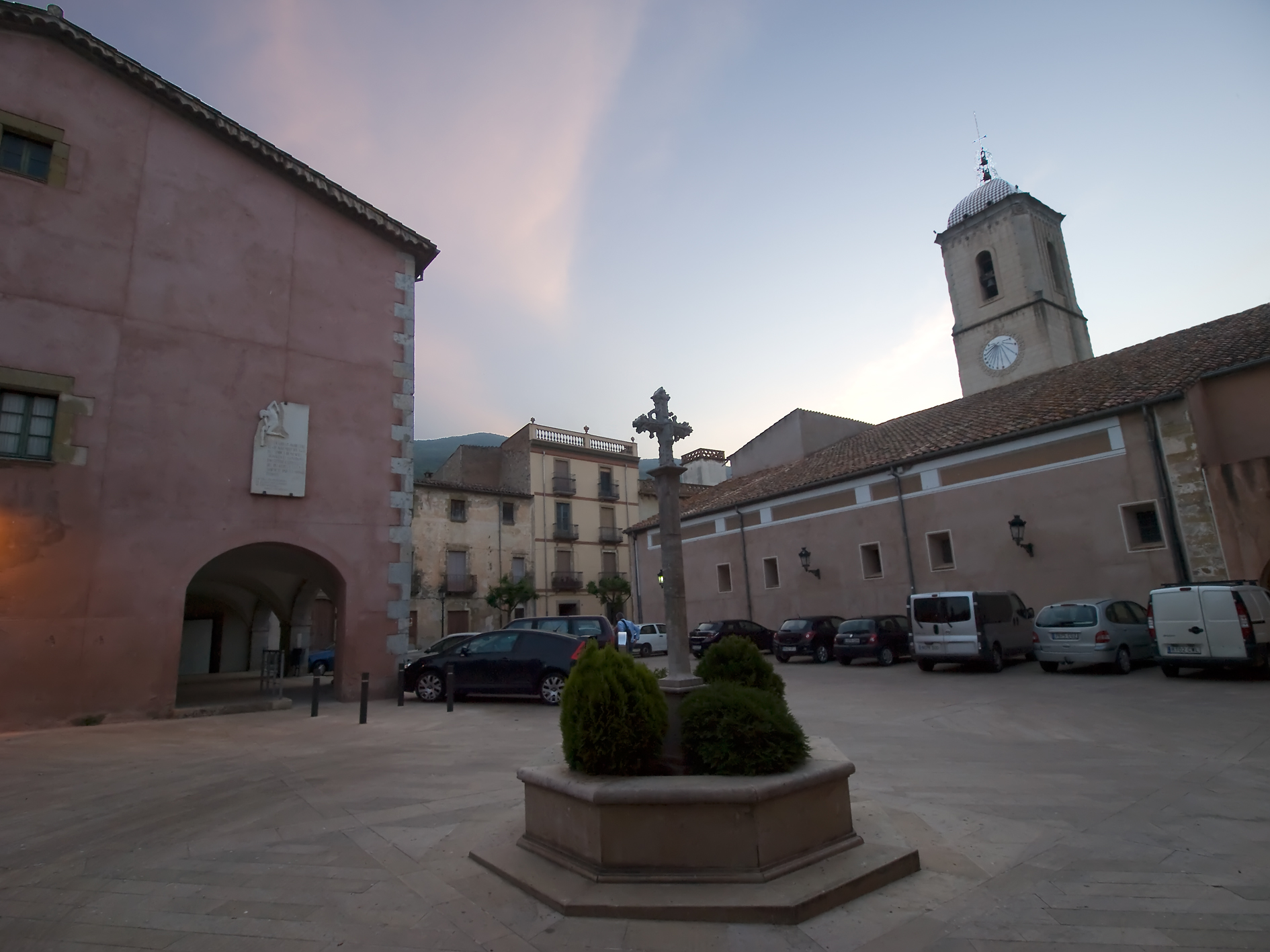
Monastery's plaza

Built in a basilica plan, the naves include barrel vaults with an apse; two semicircular apses are vaulted with quarter spheres. These are joined together with four arches on each side, and are decorated with Lombard-style pilasters on top. Some columns have been replaced. The bell tower is from 1900 replacing a Romanesque once, which disappeared during the Catalan Revolt. The cloister was destroyed in the earthquake of 1427, the sacristy being the only area preserved. Dating from the 11th century, there are two decorated capitals, one with geometric shapes and the other with four faces.

== Bibliography ==
- Oliveras, Josep Puigdemont, "L'acta de consagració de l'església del monestir de Santa Maria d'Amer", Quaderns de la Selva, 14 (2002), 111-120.
