= Palazzo Francesconi-Mocenni =

Coordinates: 43°19′20.46″N 11°19′42.57″E

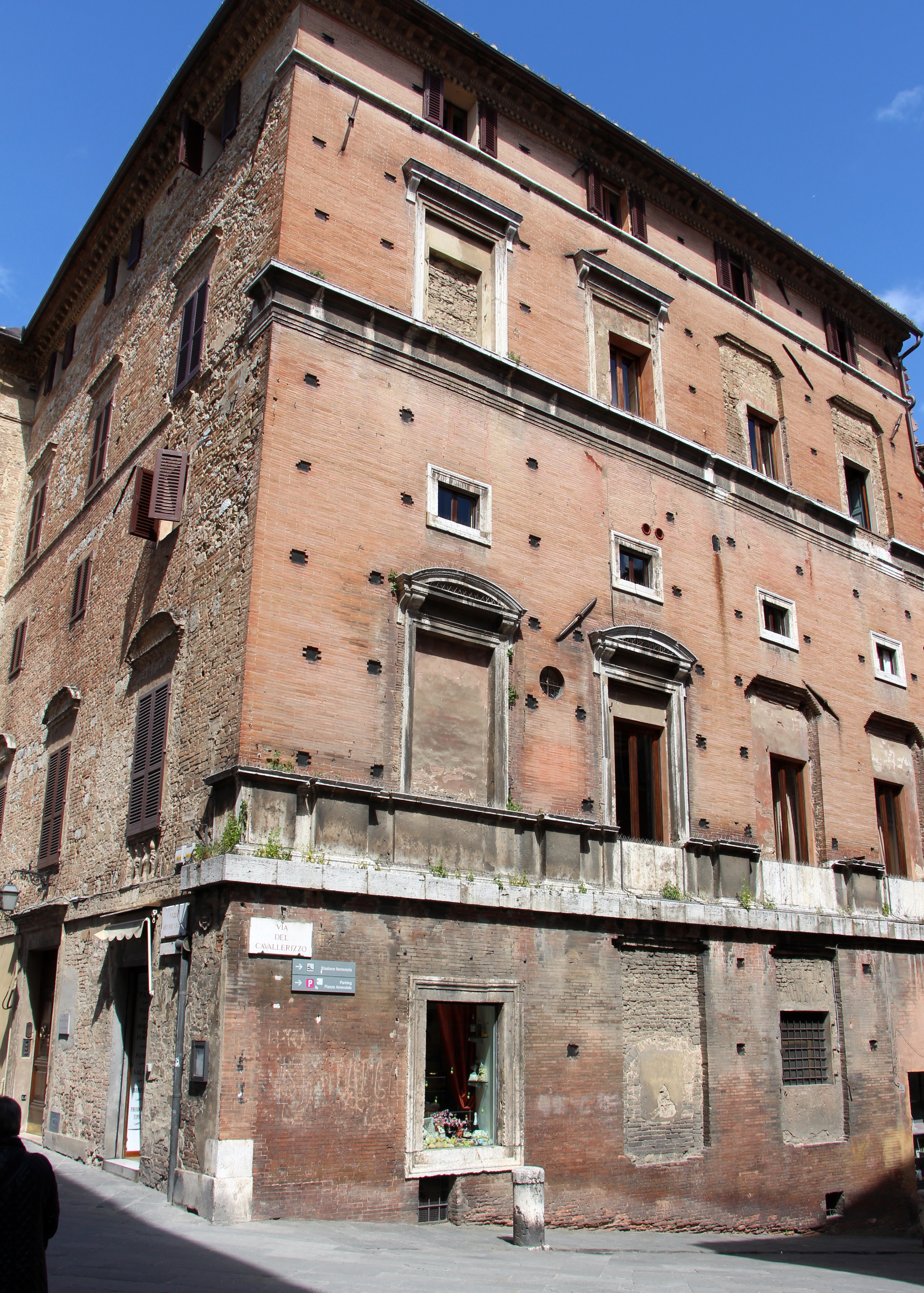
Incomplete palace façade

The Palazzo Francesconi, later Mocenni, is a 16th-century Renaissance urban palace in the Italian city of Siena, located on Piazza Gramsci, at the corner with Via del Cavallerizzo.

== History ==
The design of the palace (circa 1520) was previously attributed to Baldassarre Peruzzi, but more recently attributed to Pietro Cataneo, commissioned by Bernardo Francesconi. The palace exterior is in poor state of conservation. The façade remains incomplete with only some window frames in place; other windows are sealed with walls or reduced. The piano nobile has two rooms with frescoes attributed to Peruzzi. The third floor has 19th century frescoes.
