= Pizano =

Pizano is a Spanish surname. Notable people with the surname include:

- Francisco Pizano (born 1987), Mexican footballer
- Luis Pizano, 16th-century Spanish military engineer

== See also ==
- Daniel Samper Pizano (born 1945), Colombian lawyer, journalist and writer
- Ernesto Samper Pizano
