= 1428 Catalonia earthquake =

Earthquake in Catalonia

- Location within Catalonia
- Local date: 2 February 1428
- Local time: 08:00 to 09:00
- Magnitude: 6.7 M_{e}
- Epicenter: 42.37°N 2.15°E
- Areas affected: Catalonia
- Casualties: Hundreds

The Catalan earthquake of 2 February 1428, known in Catalan as the terratrèmol de la candelera because it took place during Candlemas, struck the Principality of Catalonia, especially Roussillon, with an epicentre near Camprodon. The earthquake was one of a series of related seismic events that shook Catalonia in a single year. Beginning on 23 February 1427, tremors were felt in March, April, 15 May at Olot, June, and December. They caused relatively minor visible damage to property, notably to the monastery of Amer; but they probably caused severe weakening of building infrastructure. This would account for the massive and widespread destruction that accompanied the subsequent 1428 quake.

Modern estimates of the intensity are VIII (Damaging) or IX (Destructive) on the Medvedev–Sponheuer–Karnik scale. The ramparts of Prats-de-Mollo-la-Preste were destroyed. The clocktower of Arles-sur-Tech collapsed. The monastery of Fontclara at Banyuls-dels-Aspres was devastated. The damage sustained by the monastery of Saint-Martin-du-Canigou marked the commencement of its decline. The belltower and lantern tower of Sant Joan de les Abadesses fell down. The chapel at Núria was destroyed. The villages of Tortellà and Queralbs were entirely destroyed. Among the damaged structures were Santa Maria de Ripoll and Sant Llorenç prop Bagà. As far away as Perpignan and Barcelona the populace was gripped by panic. In the latter, the intensity was estimated at VI (Strong) or VII (Very strong). The rose window of the Gothic church of Santa Maria del Mar was destroyed.

Robin de Molhet, lord of Peyrepertuse, who was travelling in his domains when the earthquake struck, quickly came to the aid of victims, which earned the recognition of Alfonso V of Aragon, who was away in Valencia at the time of the tremors. He was informed by the President of the Generalitat de Catalunya, Felip de Malla, in a letter. It is estimated that hundreds of people were killed in the disaster: two hundred are estimated at Camprodon, one to three hundred at Puigcerdà (due to the collapse of the church), twenty to thirty at Barcelona (in Santa Maria del Mar), and almost the entire population of Queralbs. The fallout lasted well over a year. The quake was probably the worst in the history of the Pyrenees, though the first recorded only occurred in 1373. It remains to this day a point of reference for the study of seismic risk.

== See also ==
- List of historical earthquakes
- List of earthquakes in Spain
