= Luis Pizano =

Luis Pizaño (died 5/10/1550 Laredo-España-Spain) was a Spanish Captain General of Artillery and military engineer. He is best known for his work on the fortifications of Catalonia and the Basque Country. In 1540, he sent a report to the Council informing them that the fortifications of San Sebastián were in a poor state and should be extended. He took part in the reconstruction of the San Sebastian murallas between 1542 and 1544. Charles V let Pizaño assume responsibility for the construction of the Castell de la Trinitat and other building projects in Roses, Girona in 1543. Construction of the Castell de la Trinitat commenced on 2 January 1544 and was completed in mid-1551 after Pizaño's death by the Italian engineer Pietro di Giacomo Cataneo.

== Bibliography ==
- Fermín de Sojo y Lomba (1928). Il capitano Luis Pizano. La stampa Ingegneri Memorial Ejército.Madrid.
- Alicia Cámara (2000). Le fortificazioni di Carlo V. Lo stato del Sociedad fortificazioni per la commemorazione del centenario di Filippo II e di Carlo V imperatore Carlo V.
- http://e-spacio.uned.es/fez/eserv/bibliuned:538/PDF
- http://heraldicablog.com/2011/06/24/pizano-escudo-heraldico-2/
