= Saldes =

- Municipality
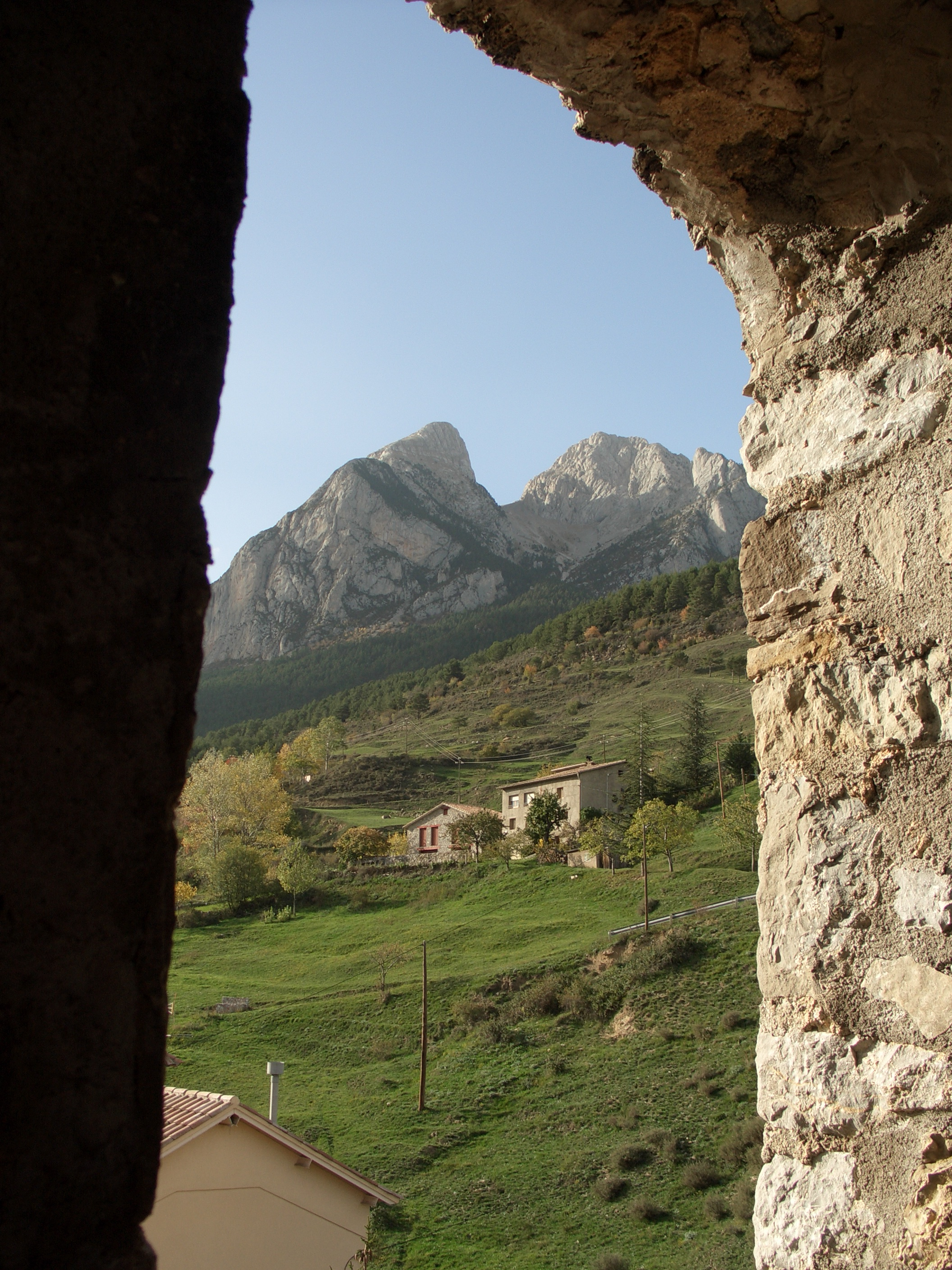
- Pedraforca from the belfry of Saldes

- Coat of arms

- Location in Catalonia Saldes (Spain)
- Coordinates: 42°14′N 1°44′E
- Country: Spain
- Community: Catalonia
- Province: Barcelona
- Comarca: Berguedà

Government
  - Mayor: Moisès Masanas López (2015) (Tots Som Poble-AM)

Area
  - Total: 66.4 km^{2} (25.6 sq mi)
- Elevation: 1,215 m (3,986 ft)

Population (2025-01-01)
  - Total: 302
  - Density: 4.55/km^{2} (11.8/sq mi)
- Demonym(s): Saldenc, Saldenca
- Website: saldes.cat

Saldes (Catalan pronunciation: [ˈsaldəs]) is a municipality in the comarca of the Berguedà in Catalonia, Spain. It is situated at the foot of the Pedraforca mountain (2,497 m (8,192 ft)) in the north of the comarca. Deposits of lignite are extracted commercially. The village is linked to Guardiola de Berguedà by a local road. The monastery Sant Sebastià del Sull is located in Saldes.

== Demography ==
1900	1930	1950	1970	1986	2018
369	582	864	405	339	265
