= Ciutadella de Roses =

Ruined fortification in Catalonia, Spain

Coordinates: 42.266944°N 3.17°E

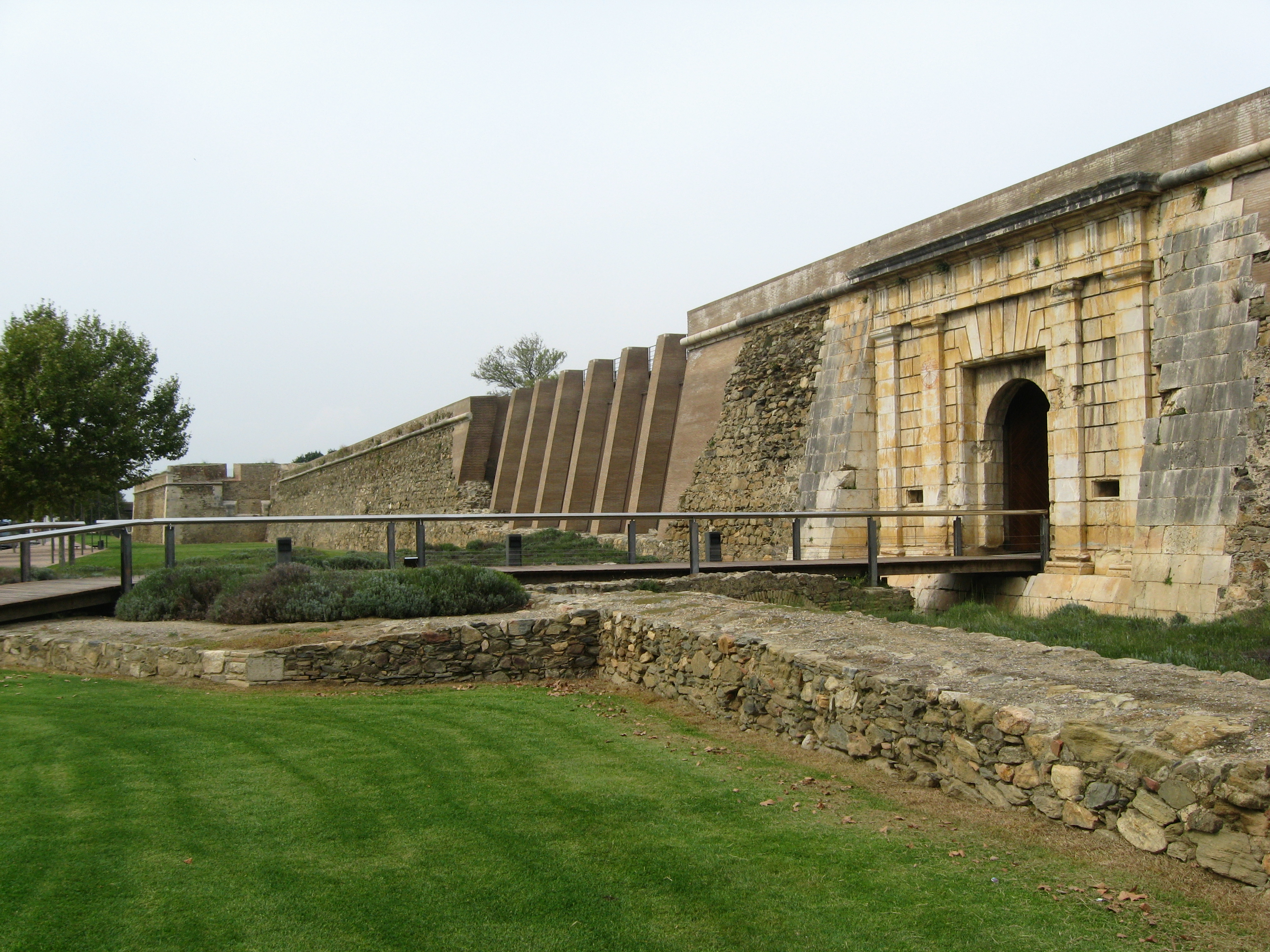
Ciutadella de Roses

Ciutadella de Roses ("Citadel of Roses"; Spanish, Ciudadela de Rosas) is a ruined fortification in the municipality of Roses, Alt Empordà comarca, Province of Girona, Catalonia, Spain. There are various buildings in its surroundings, such as the Castell de la Trinitat, as well as the monastery Santa Maria de Roses, the country's earliest known example of the Lombard architectural style. Construction of the present citadel was ordered by Charles V, Holy Roman Emperor in 1543 at the same time as Castell de la Trinitat to protect it from pirate attacks and from the French.

== History ==
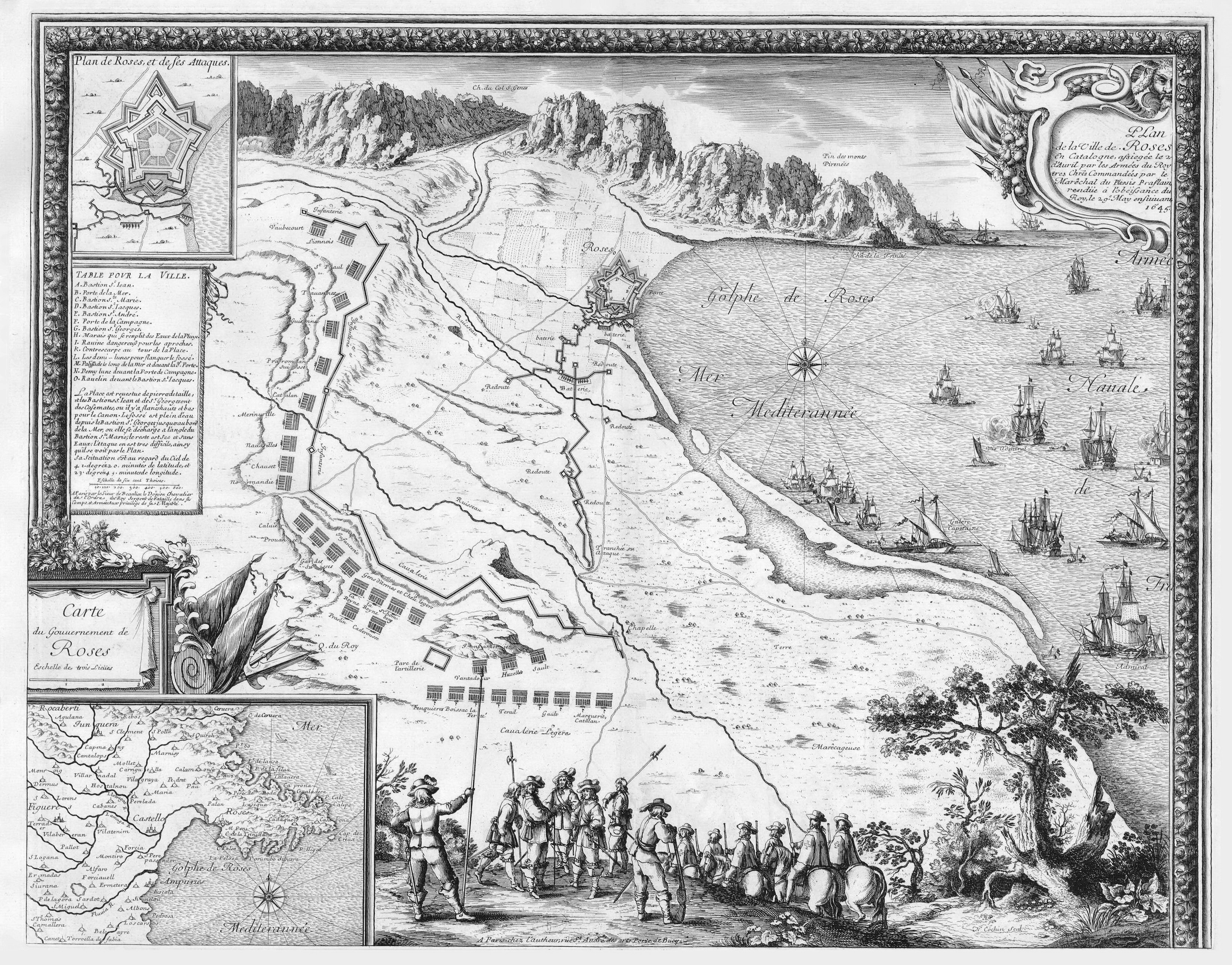
"Siege of Roses, 1645". Les glorieuses victoires de Louis le Grand, vol. 6.1. (ca. 1694), by Sébastien de Pontault

The citadel's origins date back to the 4th century BC, when Greeks from Massalia created a trading centre in the Gulf of Roses which they needed to defend from the Iberians. As it developed over the following century, coins inscribed ΡΟΔΗΤΩΝ were minted with the bust of Arethusa on the front and a rose on the back. After occupying the surrounding area in the early 2nd century during the Punic Wars, the Romans finally sacked the city under the command of Marcus Porcius Cato in the late 3rd century.

The Roman colony which was subsequently established lasted almost until the end of the Roman Empire. During the second half of the 1st century AD, Roses was given the status of a town. A temple to Minerva was completed inside the fortifications while a temple to Venus was built in the neighbouring mountains.

In the 7th century, the Visigoths built a fort on one of the Puig Rom peaks, which remained in use until the early 8th century. After a short period of occupation by the Arabs, Roses came under the county of Empúries, ruled by the Franks until the abolition of the feudal system in the 9th century. Founded by Benedictine monks in 960, the Monastery of Santa Maria soon became an important abbey with its own fishing rights. The name of Roses was not granted to the settlement until 1362.

As Roses gained importance as both a trading centre and a strategic site, it increasingly needed to be defended from attacks by Muslim pirates and by the French who were fighting the Crown of Aragon. After the French had occupied Roses and burnt it to the ground, Roger of Lauria, in command of the Aragonese fleet, overcame a French fleet in the bay, liberating the town in 1285. Fortifications were built in 1402 to protect the town from pirate attacks by sea or by overland French invasions.

With the creation of the Habsburg Empire, the Port of Roses became a vital centre of communications between the Hispanic and Italian sectors of the empire. In 1552, Charles V ordered the Citadel of Roses to be constructed as the centre of defences for the entire gulf.

As a result of an epidemic in 1588, the monks left their quarters in the Monastery of Roses, which in 1592 was attached by papal order to Santa Maria de Amer. In 1792, those still living in the monastery finally abandoned it, and the following year it was destroyed by French troops.

== Gallery ==
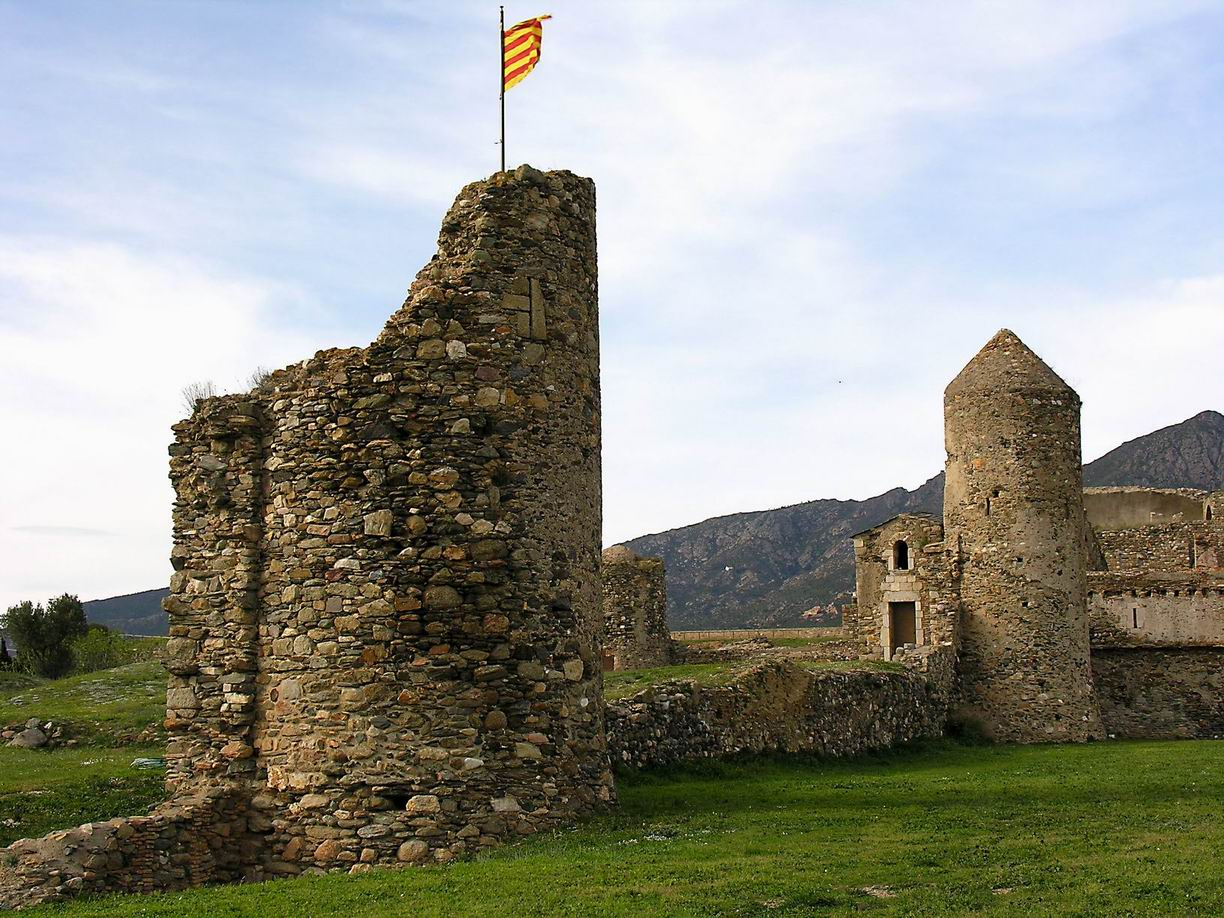
Medieval muralla

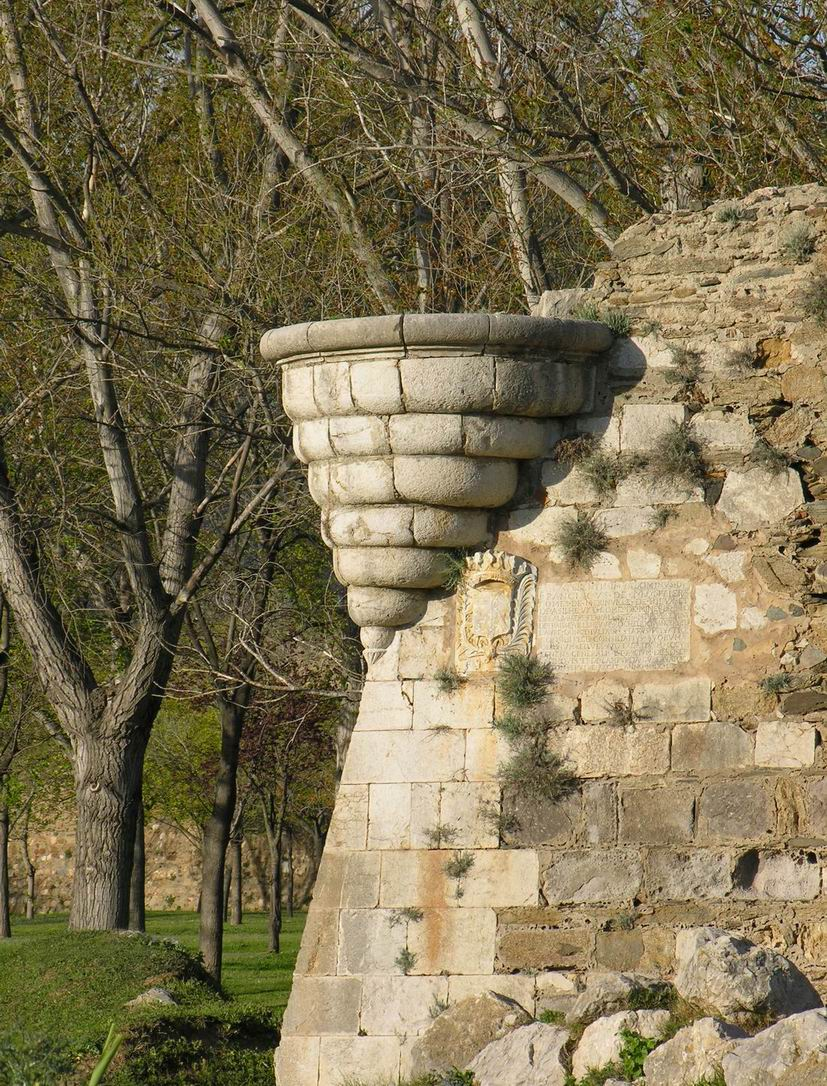
El "Cossi de la Reina"

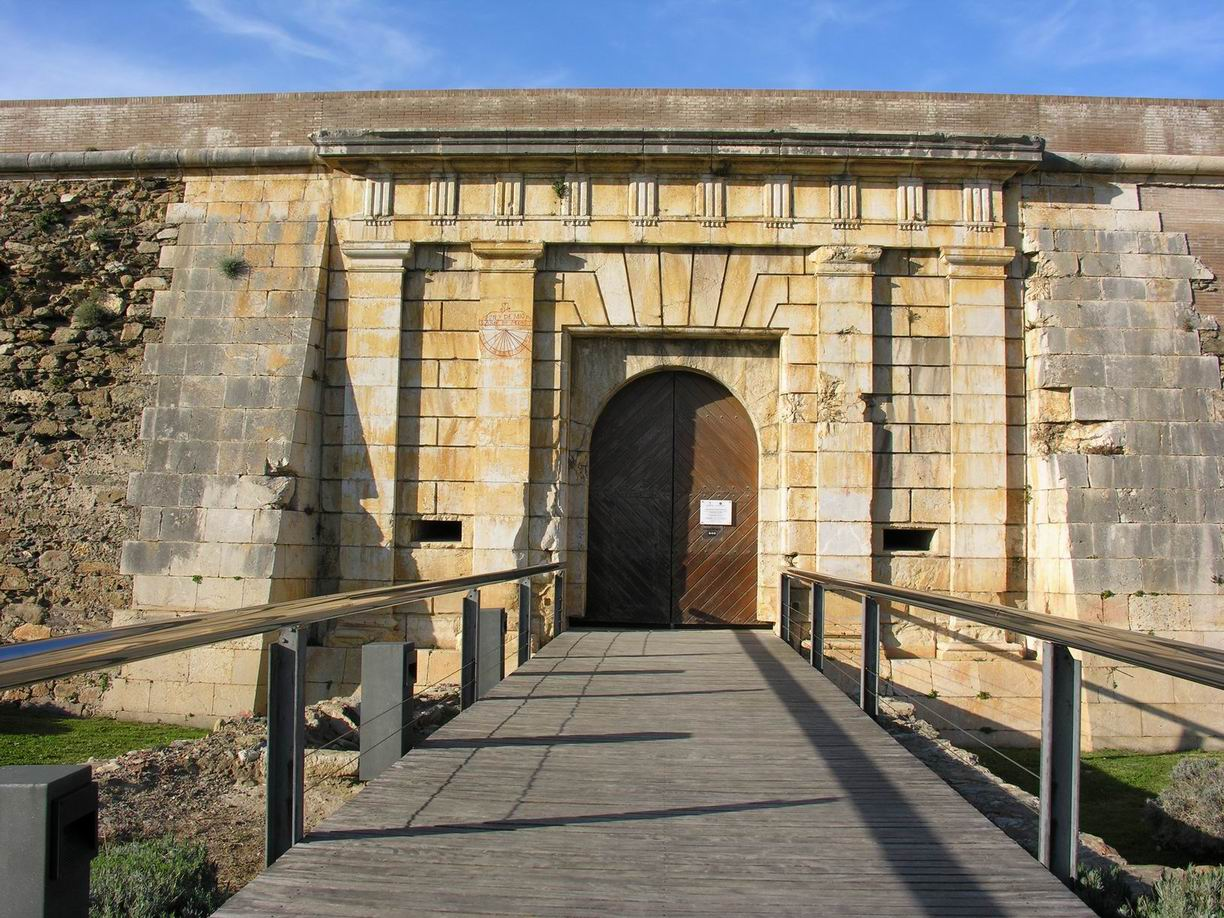
Porta de Mar

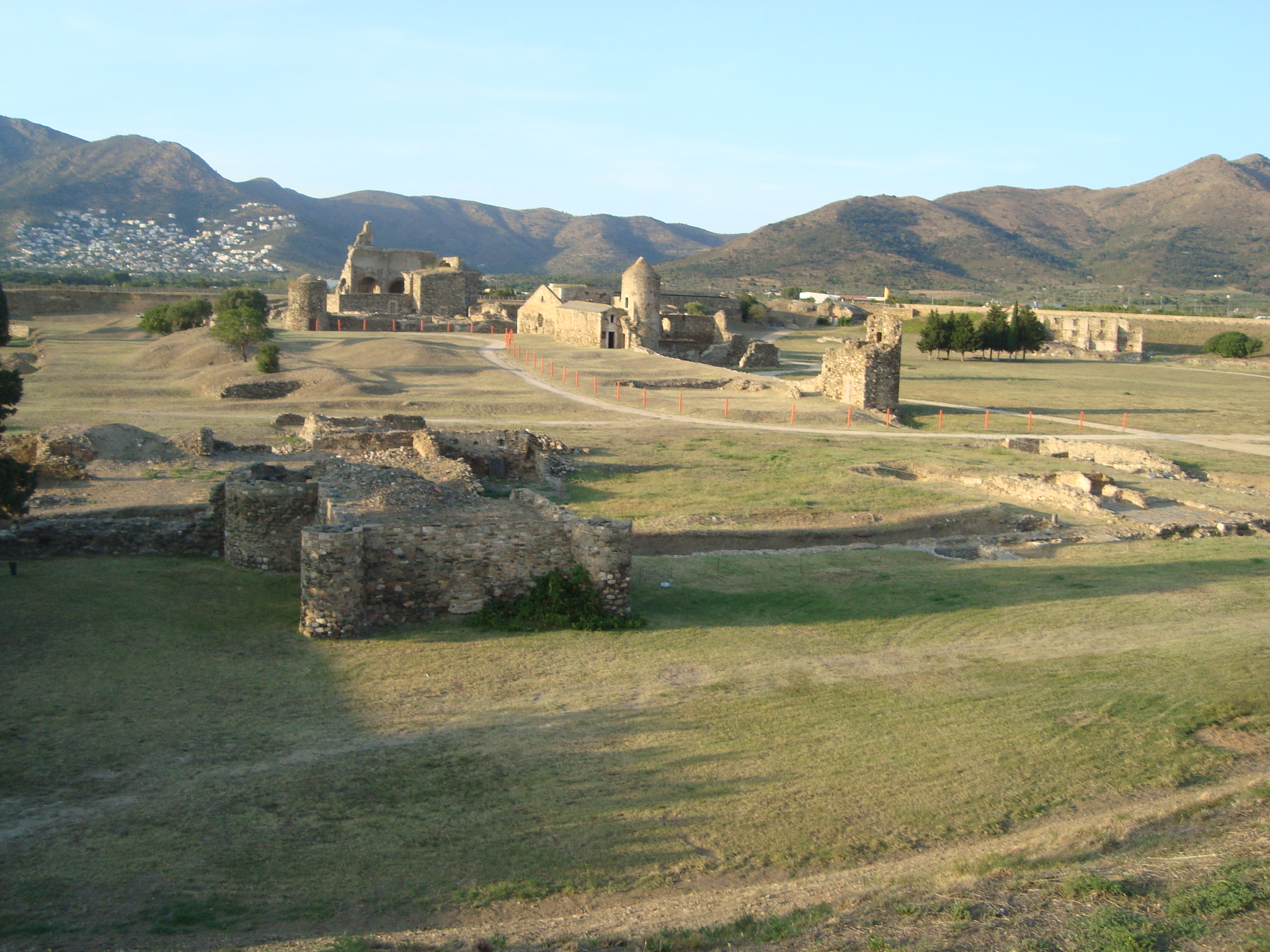
Interior view
