= Cóll =

Village in Lleida, Spain

Cóll Coll
- Locality
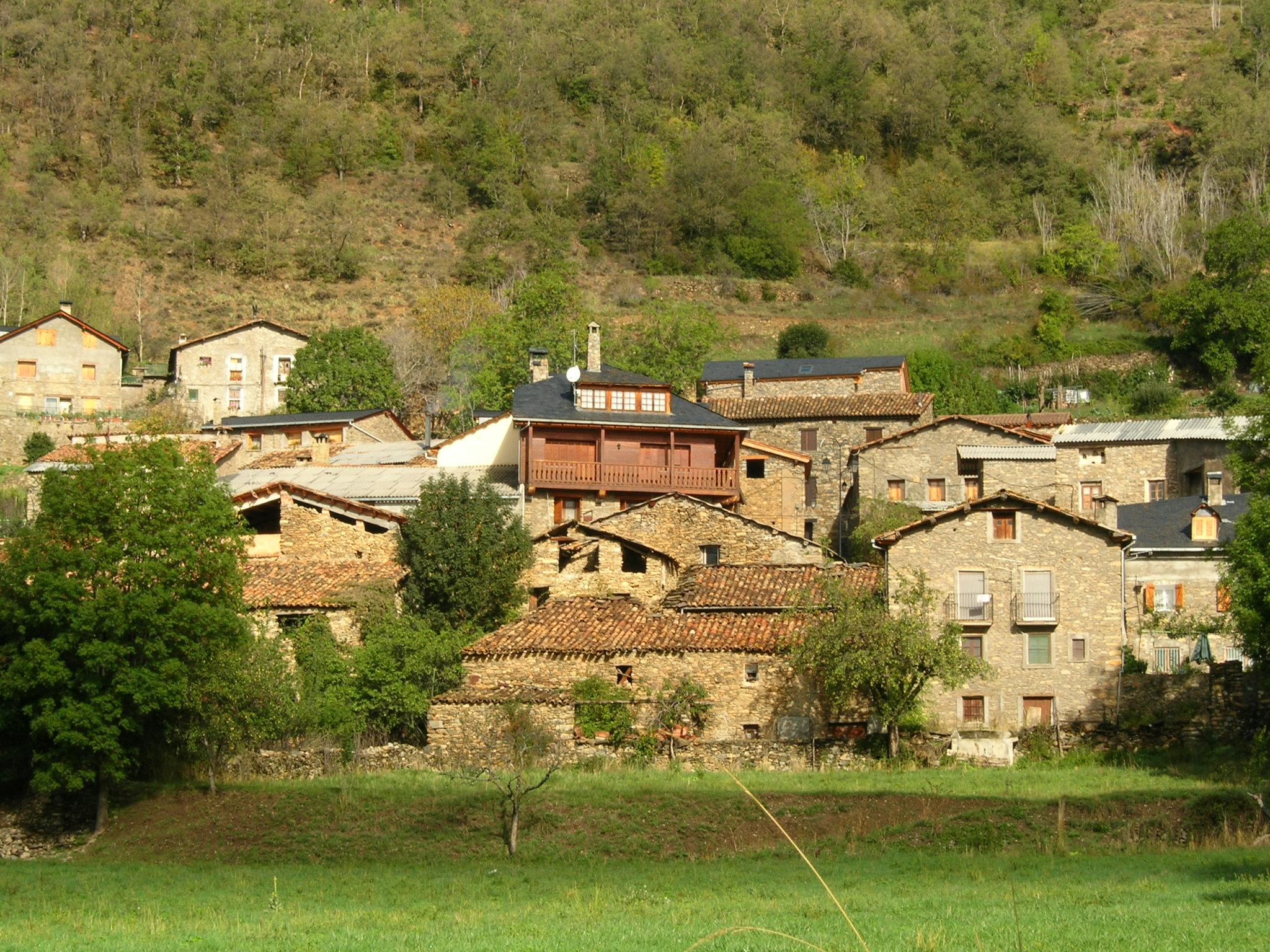

- Location in Catalonia
- Coordinates: 42°28′22″N 0°46′18″E
- Country: Spain
- Autonomous community: Catalonia
- Province: Lleida
- Comarca: Alta Ribagorça
- Municipality: Vall de Boí
- Elevation: 1,180 m (3,870 ft)

Population (2008)
  - Total: 37
- Time zone: UTC+1 (CET)
  - Summer (DST): UTC+2 (CEST)
- Postal code: 25527

Cóll (Spanish: Coll) is a village in the province of Lleida, in Catalonia, Spain. It lies in the valley and municipality of Vall de Boí in the comarca of Alta Ribagorça, at an altitude of 1,180 m.

== Romanesque church ==
The Romanesque church of Santa Maria dates from the 12th century. It has a nave with barrel vaulting, and a bell tower.
