= Castell de la Trinitat =

Castle in Spain

Coordinates: 42.247348°N 3.183786°E

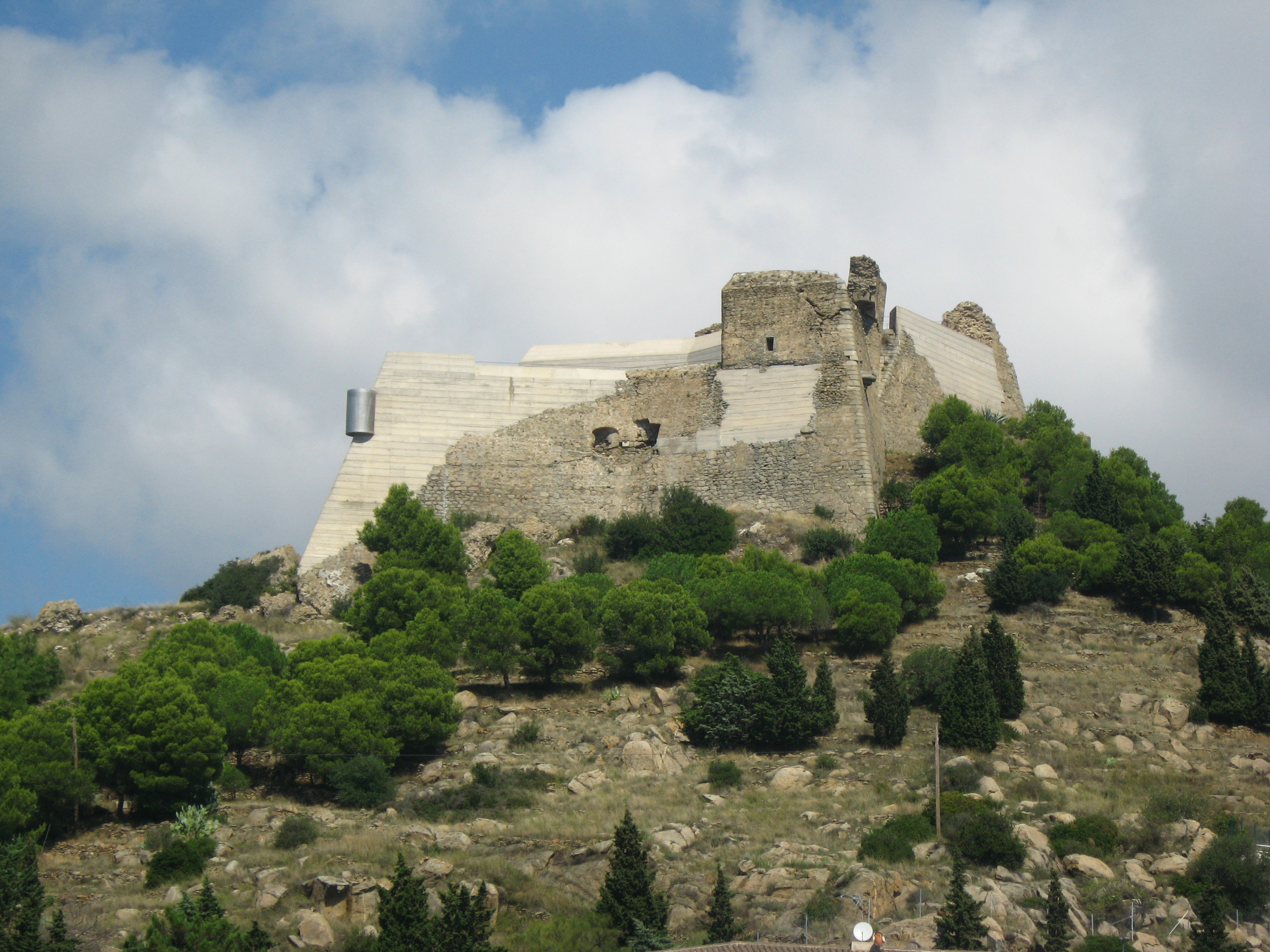
Castell de la Trinitat

Castell de la Trinitat (also known as the Castillo de la Poncella or the Botón de Roses) is located on the Gulf of Roses, Alt Empordà comarca, Province of Girona, Catalonia, Spain. Along with the Ciutadella de Roses, it provided defenses for the town of Roses.

== History ==
The name comes from a chapel built in 1508, which was destroyed, along with a defense tower that stood in the area, when the castle was built, ordered by Emperor Charles V (Carlos I) in 1543. Work began on January 2, 1544, and the castle was completed in mid 1551 under the Spanish engineer Luis Pizano.

In 1808, it was defended for twelve days by Royal Navy sailors and Royal Marines under the command of Captain Thomas, Lord Cochrane, supported by Catalan militia and regulars, and the damage inflicted by the besieging French and Italian artillery was compounded by an immense explosion of gunpowder barrels from Cochrane's frigate HMS Imperieuse, laid by him to deny the investing French control of the sea approaches to the Bay of Rosas.

The Castell de la Trinitat was declared a Bien de Interés Cultural landmark in 1988. Derelict for nearly 200 years, it underwent restoration amounting to about 2 million euros between 2002 and 2010, and a museum was established at the site. It reopened to the public on 26 September 2010.

== Description ==
The castle was built in the shape of a five-pointed star for defense purposes. The construction is about 18–20 metres high, with thick walls, and designed to house a garrison of about 350 men.

== Gallery ==
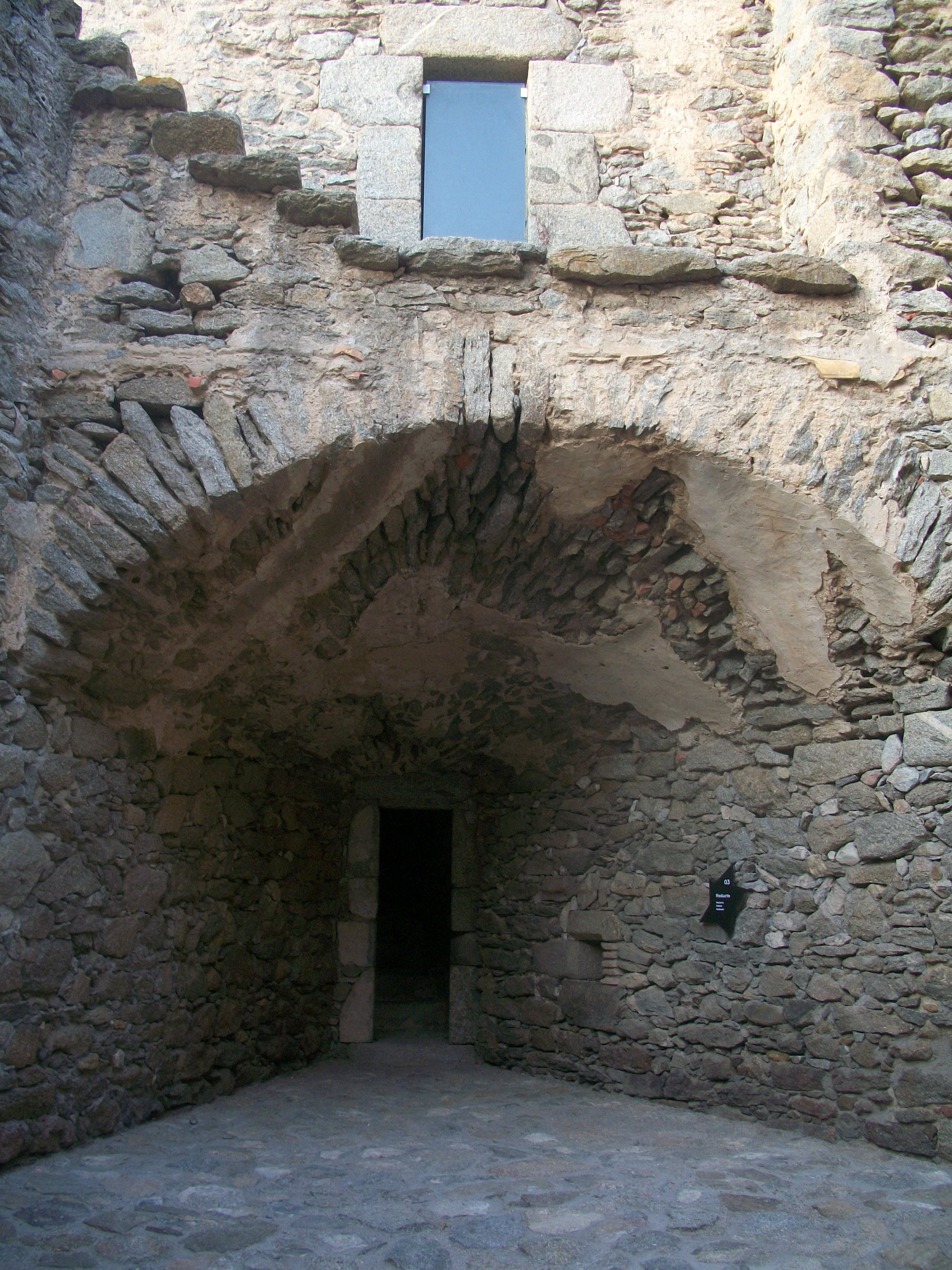

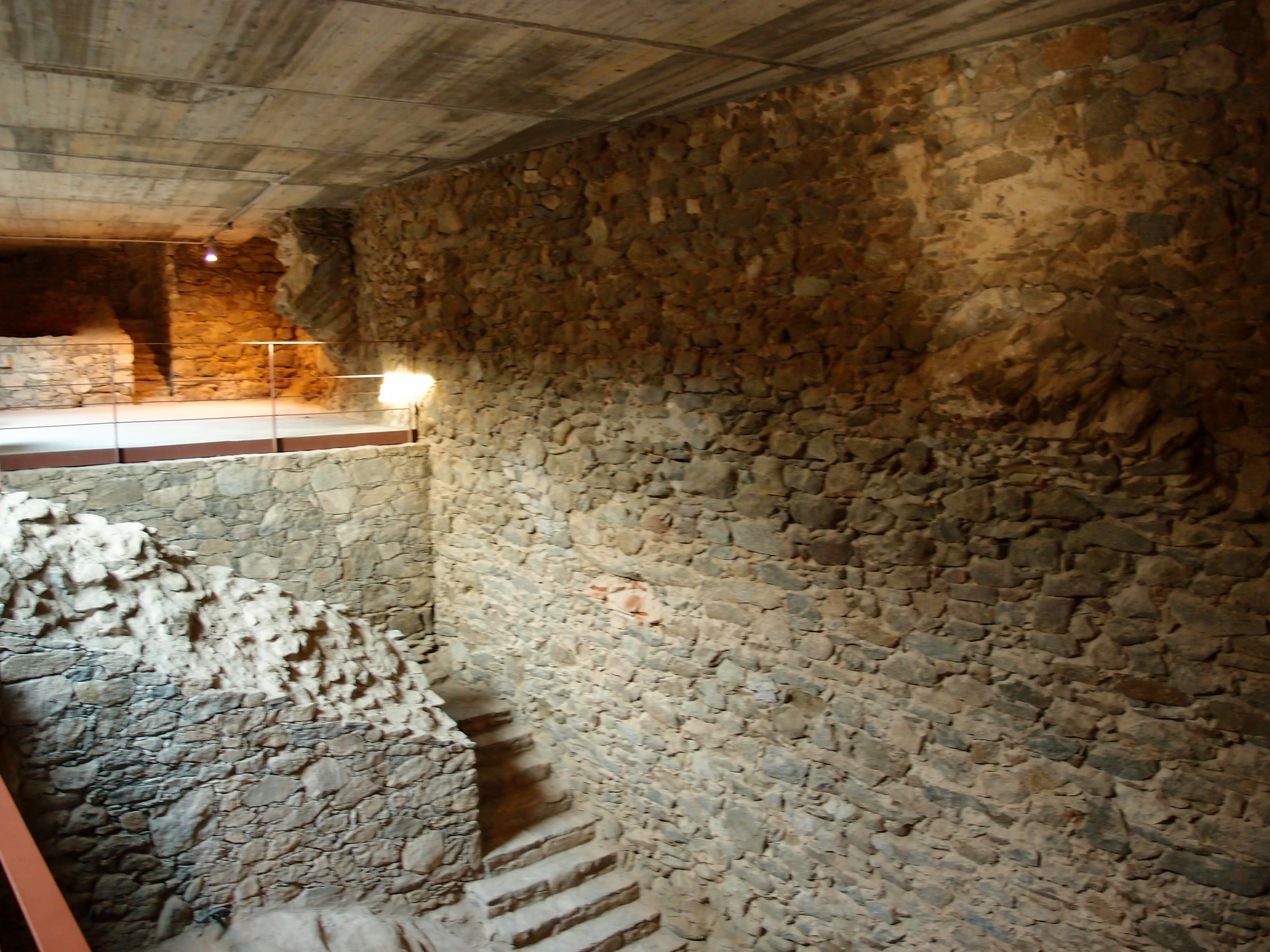

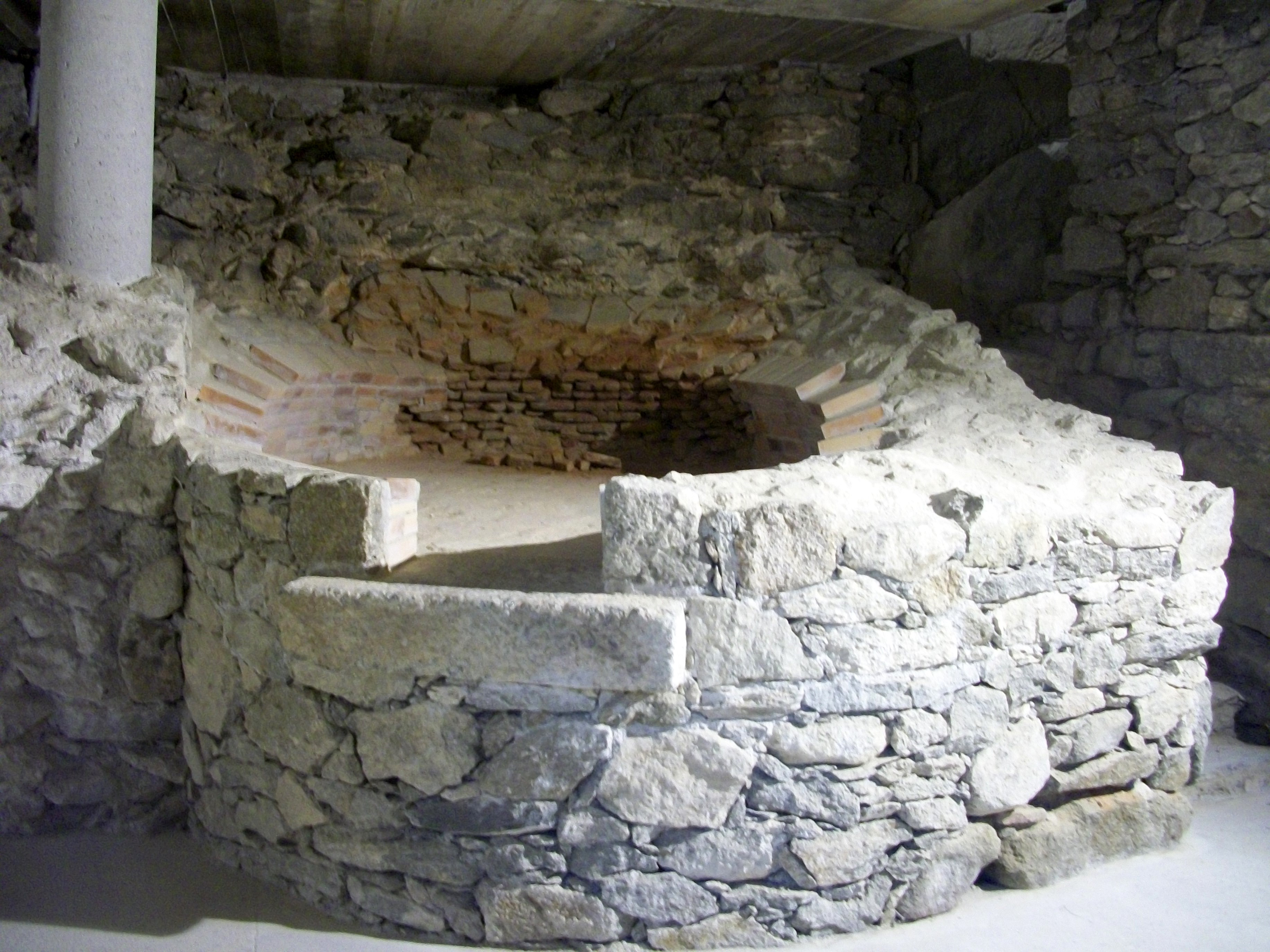

== Bibliography ==
- C. Díaz, H. Palou i A. M. Puig, La Ciutadella de Roses, Quaderns de la revista de Girona, 2004.
- Reay, Justin, "The Royal Navy in the Bay of Rosas, 1808-09", in C. Diaz, R. Pedler and J. Reay, El Setge de Roses de 1808, Ajuntament de Roses 2008, pp88–133 and 240–284.
- Reay, Justin, "A Place of Considerable Importance: Lord Cochrane at the Siege of Rosas 1808", The Mariner's Mirror November 2009, available at Oxford University Research Archive at http://ora.ox.ac.uk/objects/uuid:2bc4c3b7-fb89-452c-a0a2-51dd6e95de30.
- Pujol i Hamelink, Marcel, La vila de Roses (segles XIV i XVI), Roses: Ajuntament de Roses, 1997.
- De la Fuente, Pablo, Les fortificacions reials del golf de Roses a l'època moderna, Roses: Ajuntament de Roses, 1998.
