= Santa Maria, Roses =

Benedictine monastery in Roses, Spain

Coordinates: 42.267742°N 3.170253°E

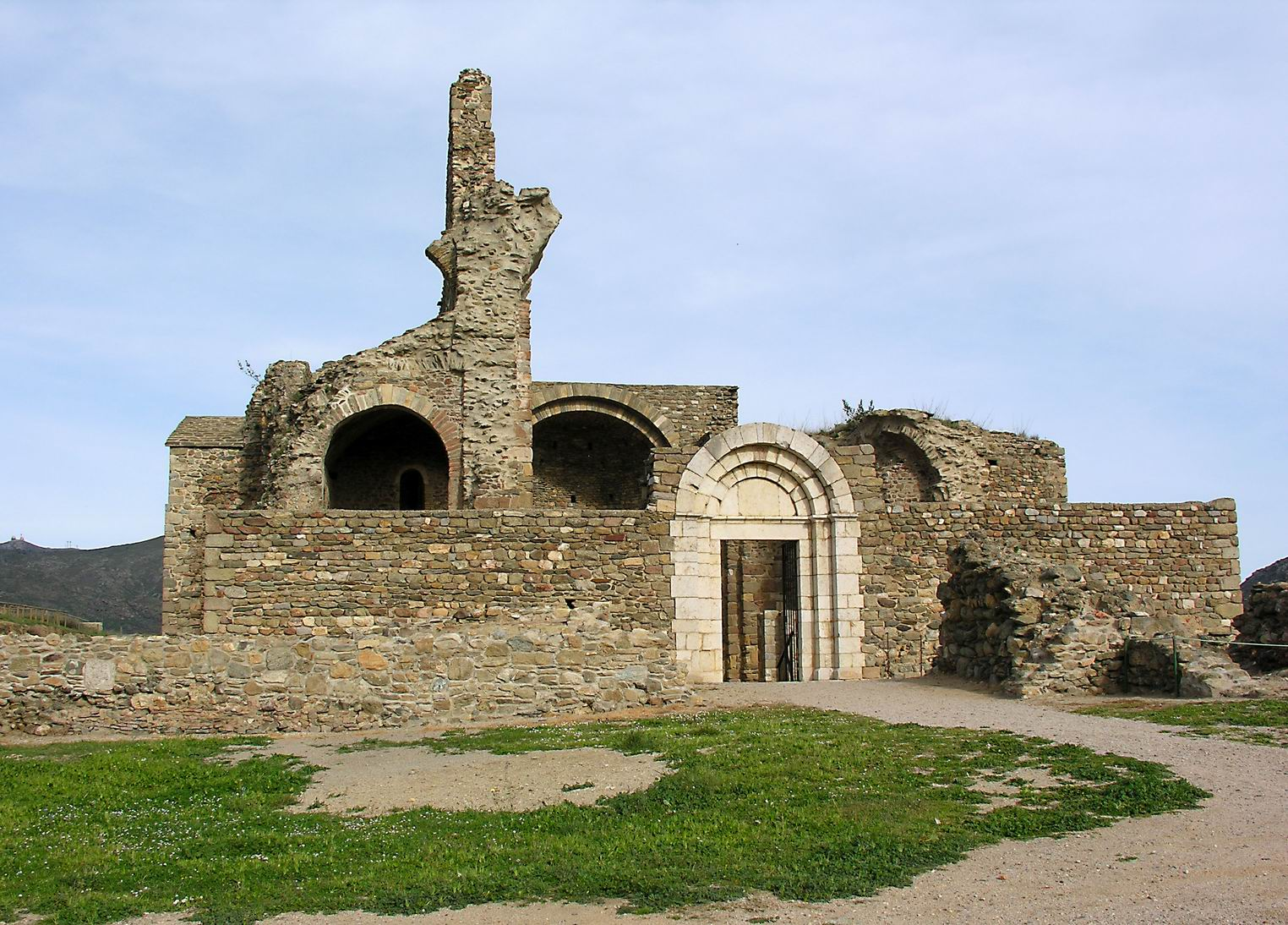
Santa Maria de Roses

Santa Maria de Roses is a ruined Benedictine monastery in the municipality of Roses, Alt Empordà comarca, Catalonia, Spain. It is situated within the Ciutadella de Roses, a fortification in the Province of Girona. It is the earliest known example of Lombard architectural style in the country.

== History ==
The origin of this monastery is in a church, Santa Maria de Rodes, belonging to the Monastery of Sant Pere de Rodes. The monastic activity was affected repeatedly by attacks from Saracen pirates. In 960, the monastic community received protection Gausfred I, Count of Ampurias and Roussillon. In 976, it received fishing rights as well as shipwreck rights in local waters and for various goods. A foundation charter dates to 1022. There were several subsidiaries such as Santa Maria de Pedardell and Santa Maria del Camp.

The monastery began to decline in the 15th century. In 1588, because of a plague epidemic, the monastic houses were abandoned and the monastery was looted. In 1592, by papal order, it was joined to the monastery of Santa Maria d'Amer. In 1792, it was abandoned by the monks and in 1793, Napoleon's troops destroyed the building. A restoration occurred in 1966-69.

== Architecture ==
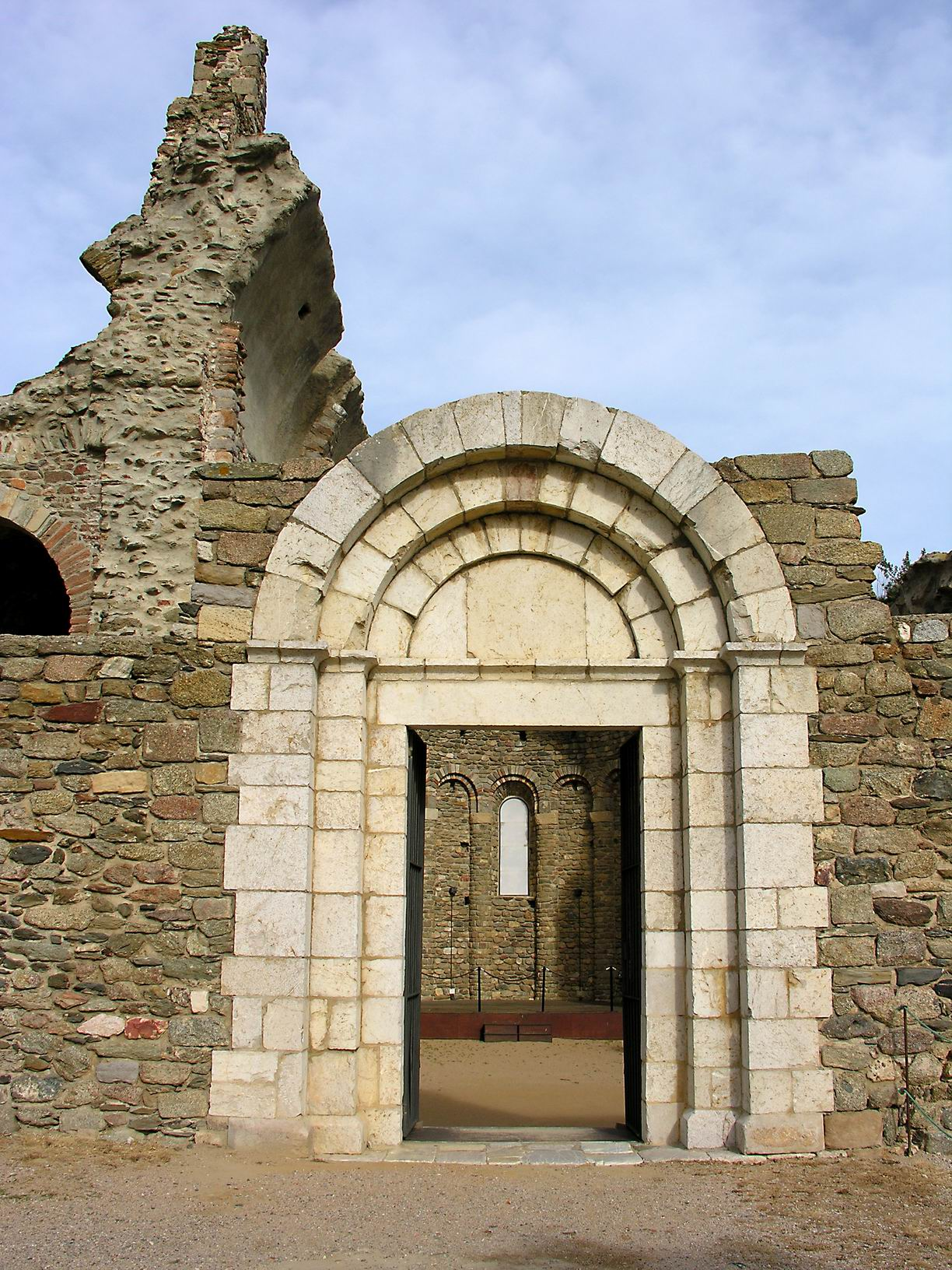
Door

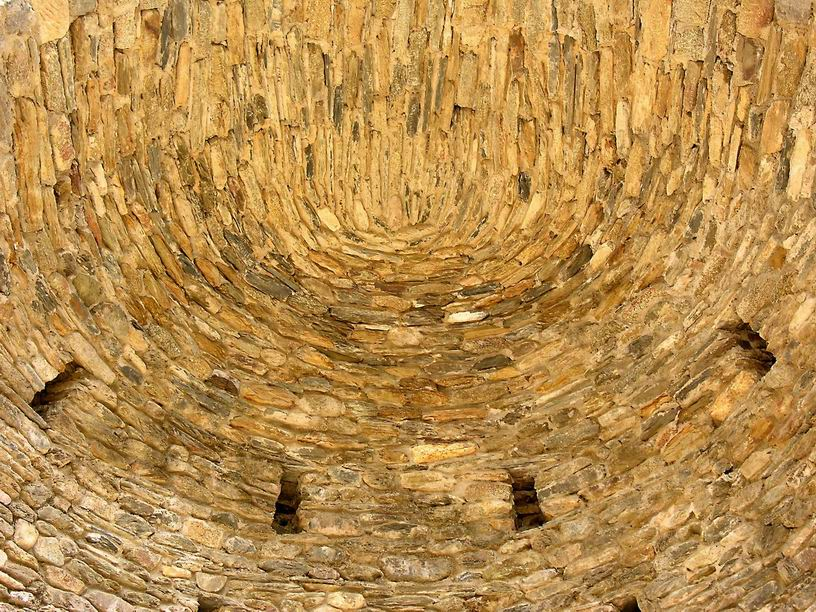
Vault

Constructed in a basilica plan, it has three naves with a transept and three apses. There is a barrel vault in the nave. Lombard decoration of the interior walls is still visible. There is a series of blind arches. They are also remnants of a cloister and some monastic buildings. A restoration project began in the late 20th century.

== Abbots ==
| Number | Name | Period |
|---|---|---|
| 1 | Llunesi | 960? |
| 2 | Guifré | 976 |
| 3 | Sunyer | 976-995 |
| 4 | Sunifred | 1008 |
| 5 | Adalbert | 1020-1022 |
| 6 | Ponç | 1040 |
| 7 | Ecard | 1046 |
| 8 | Ramon Hug | 1050-1064 |
| 9 | Deodat | 1070-1083 |
| 10 | Adalbert | 1093-1095 |
| 11 | Bernat | 1109-1111 |
| 12 | Berenguer | 1117-1122 |
| 13 | Bernat | 1137-1154 |
| 14 | Guillem | 1157 |
| 15 | Pere | 1157-1167 |
| 16 | Gaufred | 1174 |
| 17 | Guillem de Fortià | 1177-1205 |
| 18 | Bernat | 1211 |
| 19 | Ramon de Garriga | 1211-1214 |
| 20 | Pere de Narbona | 1217-1228 |
| 21 | Ponç | 1228-1229 |
| 22 | Ramon | 1231 |
| 23 | Ponç | 1232-1251 |
| 24 | Berenguer | 1261-1265 |
| 25 | Ramon | 1279-1296 |
| 26 | Bernat | 1296 |
| 27 | Dalmau de Fortià | 1304-1318 |
| 28 | Jaume de Guixà | 1320-1322 |
| 29 | Dalmau de Tresvalls | 1322-1348 |
| 30 | Francesc Gic | 1348-1362 |
| 31 | Arnau | 1369 |
| 32 | Francesc de Raset | 1372 |
| 33 | Bernat | 1373-1381 |
| 34 | Guillem | |
| 35 | Bernat de Pontons | 1392-1396 |
| 36 | Bernat Estruc | 1401 |
| 37 | Hug de Reixac | 1416-1426 |
| 38 | Jaume | 1428 |
| 39 | Joan | 1444-1448 |
| 40 | Nicolau Desllor | 1472-1512 |
| 41 | Bernat Desllor | 1512-1543 |
| 42 | Joan Ortells | 1545?-1553 |
| 43 | Joan Caldes | 1553-1572 |
