= Santa Maria, Cóll =

Eglésia de Santa Maria de l'Assumpció
UNESCO World Heritage Site
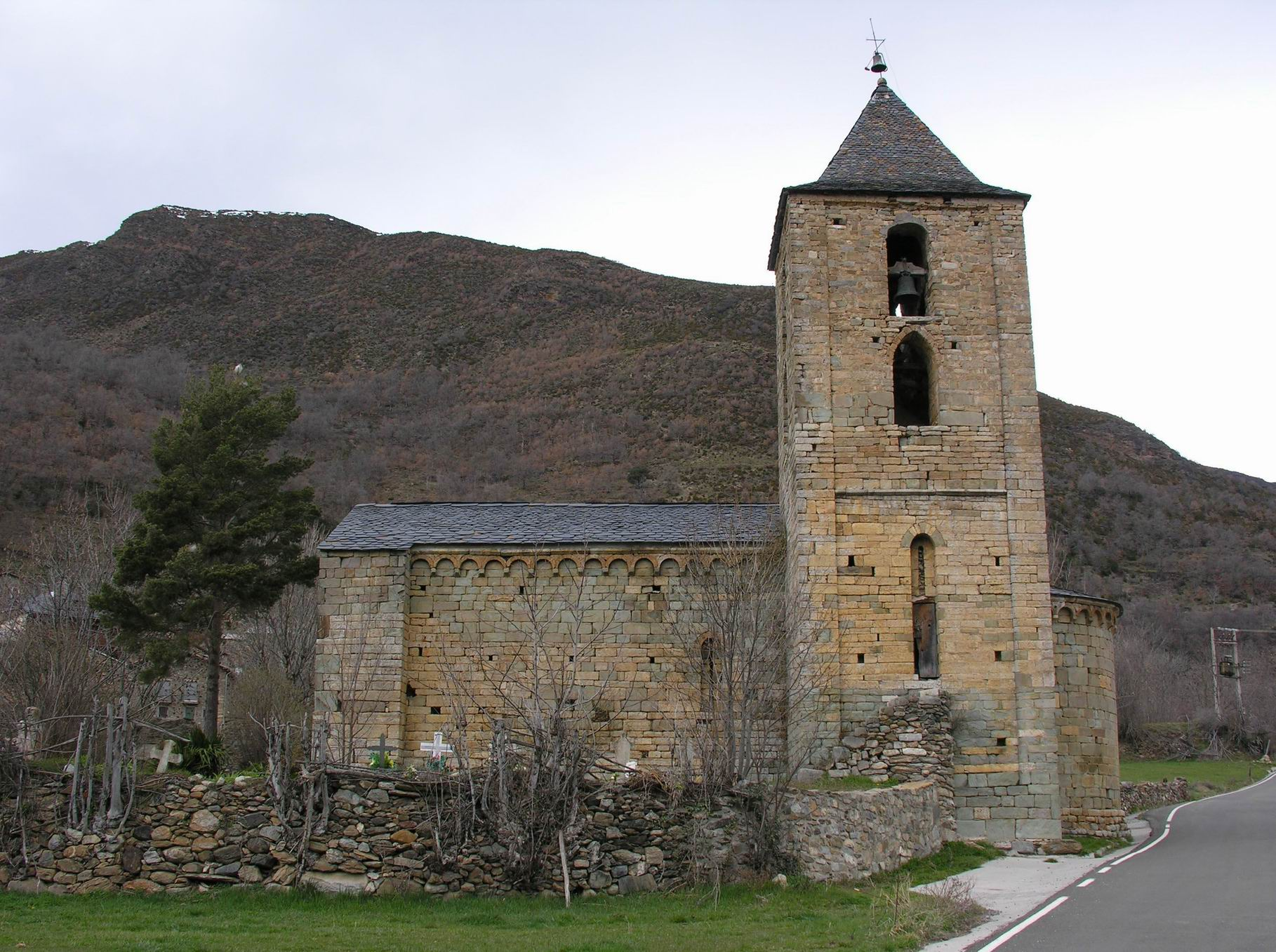

- Location within Catalonia Location within Spain
- Location: Cóll, Vall de Boí, Alta Ribagorça, Province of Lleida, Catalonia, Spain
- Part of: Catalan Romanesque Churches of the Vall de Boí
- Criteria: Cultural: (ii), (iv)
- Reference: 988-005
- Inscription: 2000 (24th Session)
- Area: 0.46 ha (1.1 acres)
- Coordinates: 42°28′20″N 0°46′22″E

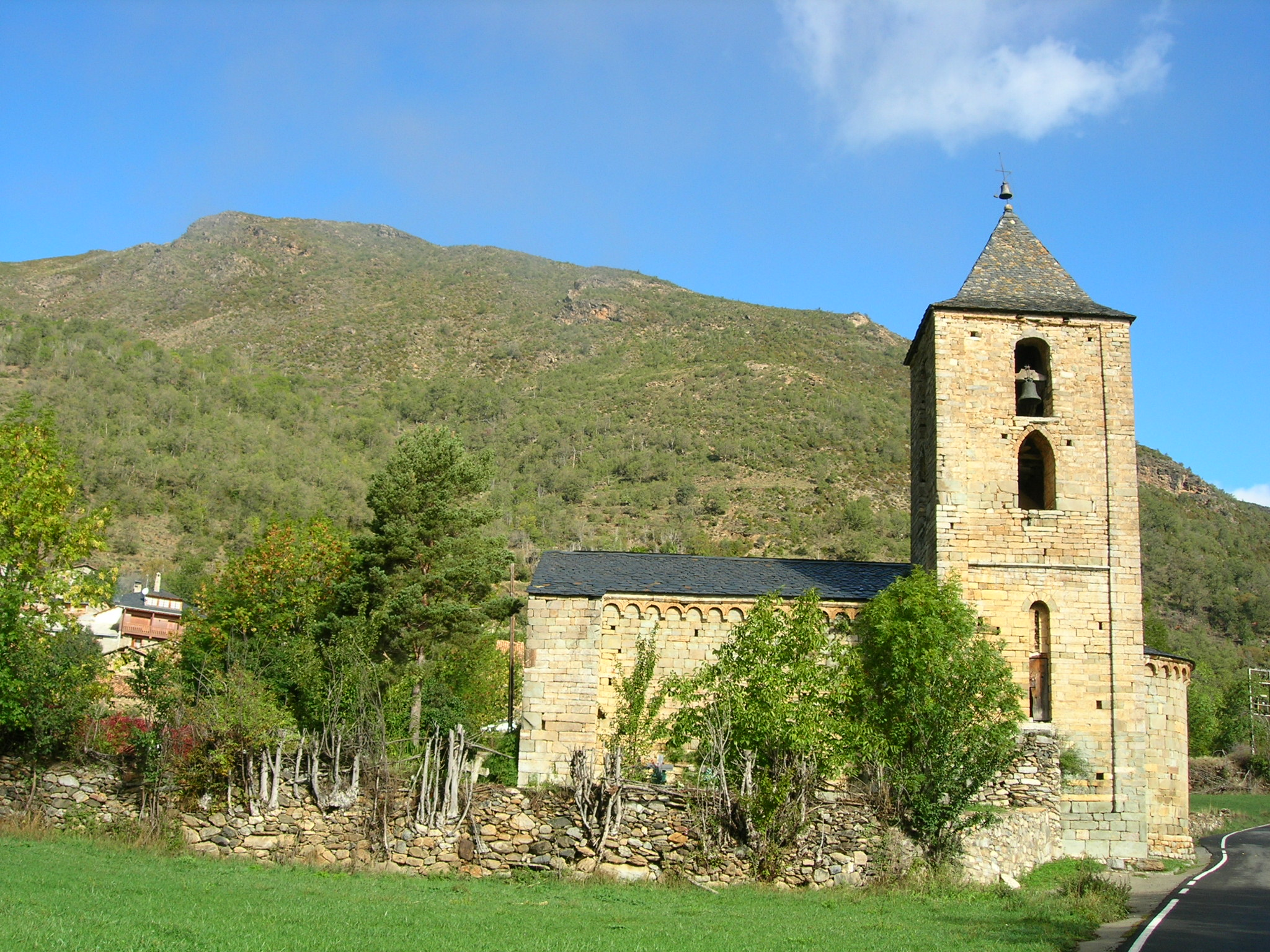
Santa Maria de Cóll

Santa Maria de Cóll is a Romanesque church in Cóll in the municipality of Vall de Boí, Catalonia, Spain. It was consecrated in the year 1110. It became a Bien de Interés Cultural site in 1992, and in 2000 it was declared part of the Vall de Boí UNESCO World Heritage Site.

== Description ==
The church is located at a height of 1,412 m (4,633 ft) in the village of Coll. It is thought to have been built in the 12th century. Its nave, which is not flanked with aisles, is covered with barrel vaulting reinforced by two arches supported by columns without capitals. At the eastern end, there is a semi-circular apse. A quadrangular bell tower with a steeple stands against the south façade.

On the north side, there is a chapel with a barrel vault which, together with the chapel on the south side gives the impression of a transept. The Gothic choir at the back of the church can be reached by a staircase next to the main entrance. The exterior is decorated with a series of blind arches which surround the entire building just below the roof. An oculus in the western gable provides illumination. The main door at the east end is crowned with an arch supported by columns with decorated capitals. Those on the outside are decorated with plant designs while those inside have figures of men fighting with animals symbolizing the fight between good and evil.

Inside the church there is a statue of Our Lady of the Rosary.

== Gallery ==
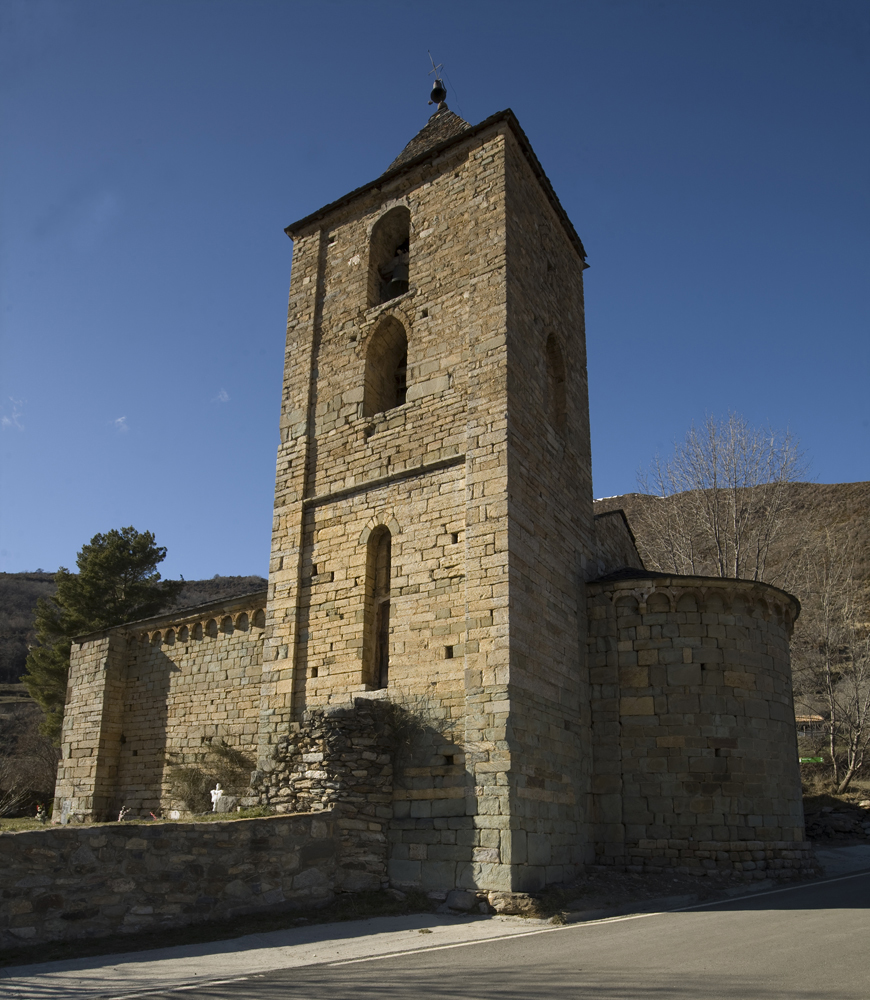
Distant view of Santa Maria de Cóll

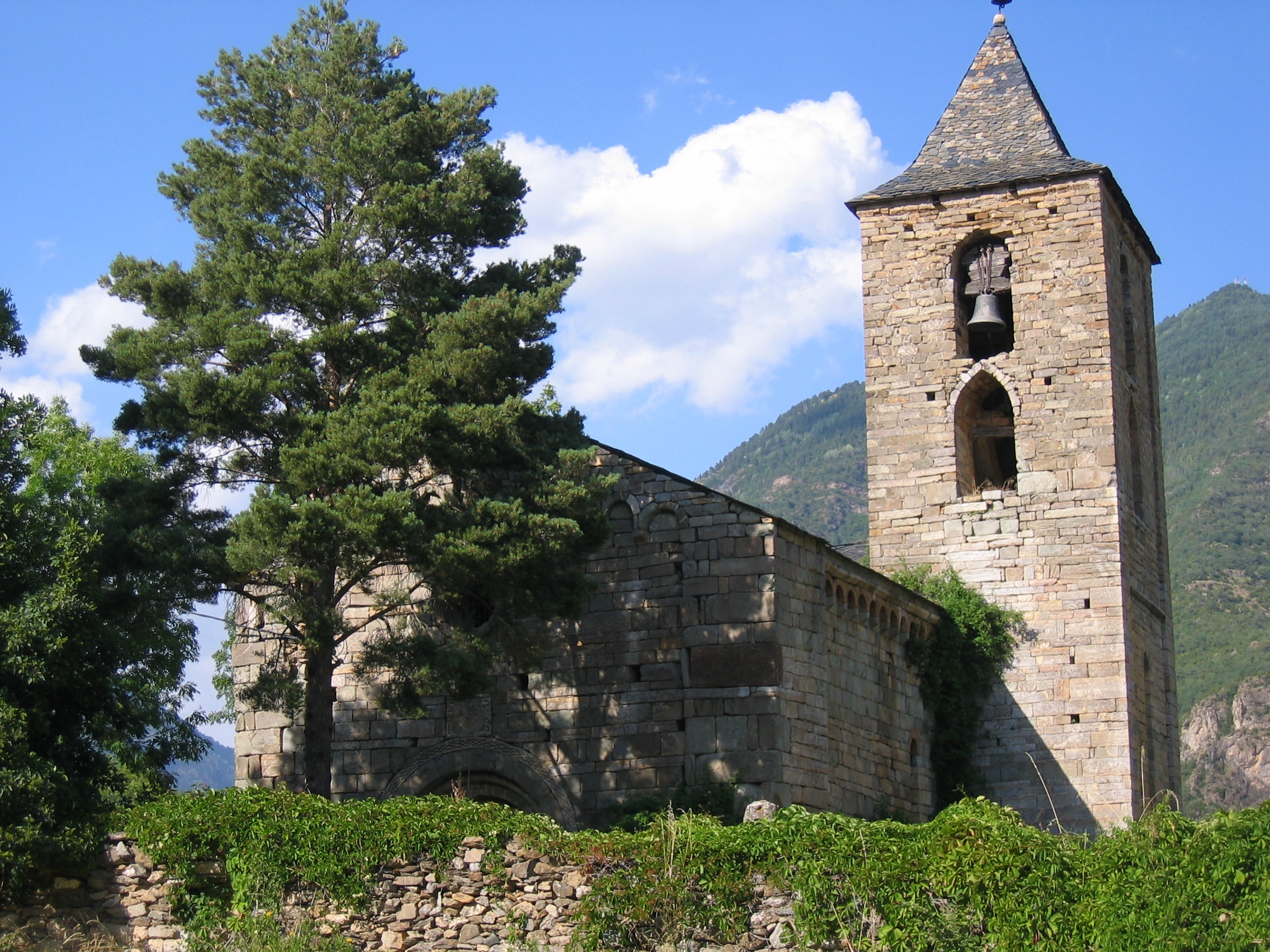
View of Santa Maria de Cóll

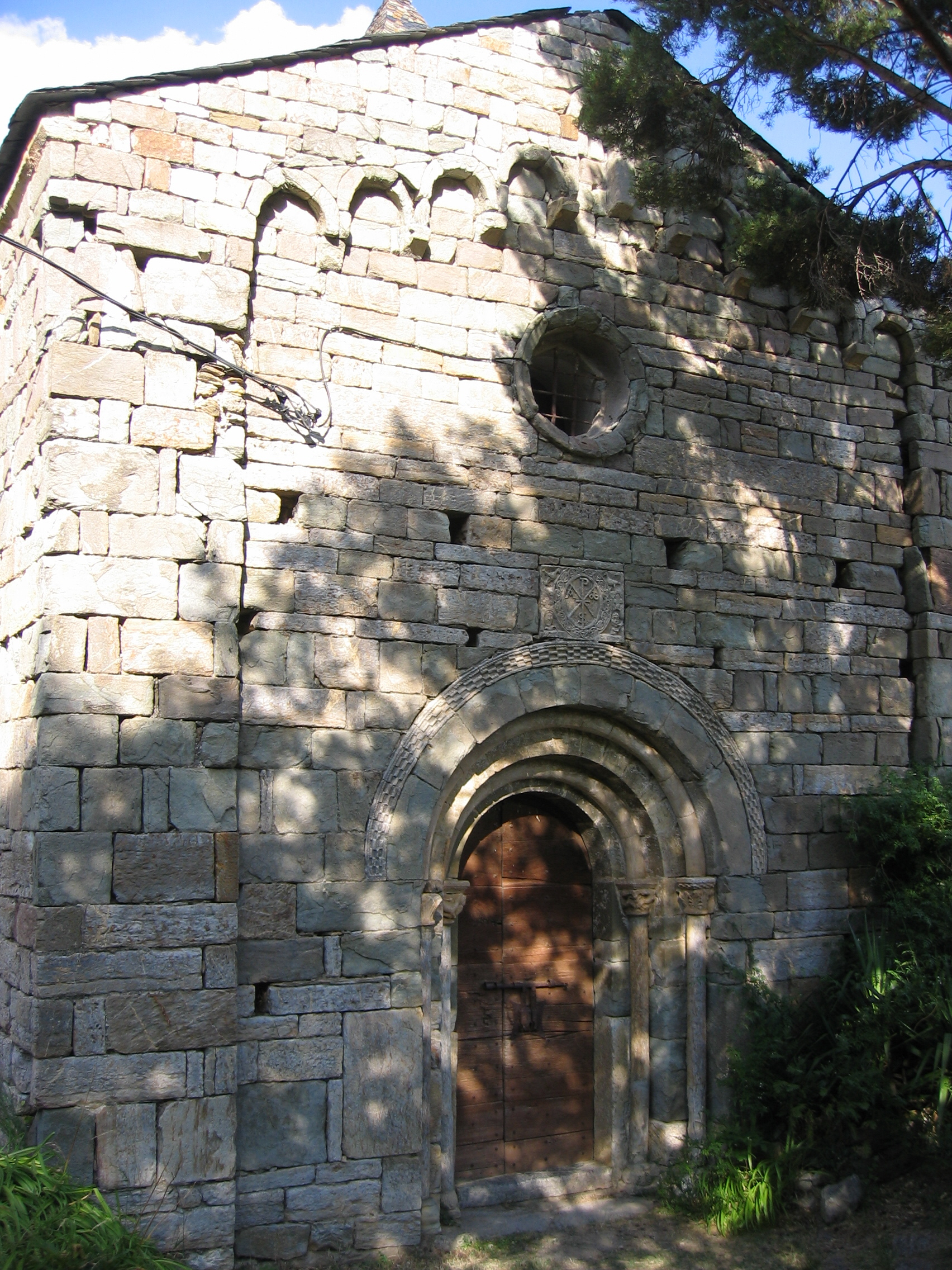
Entrance, Santa Maria de Cóll

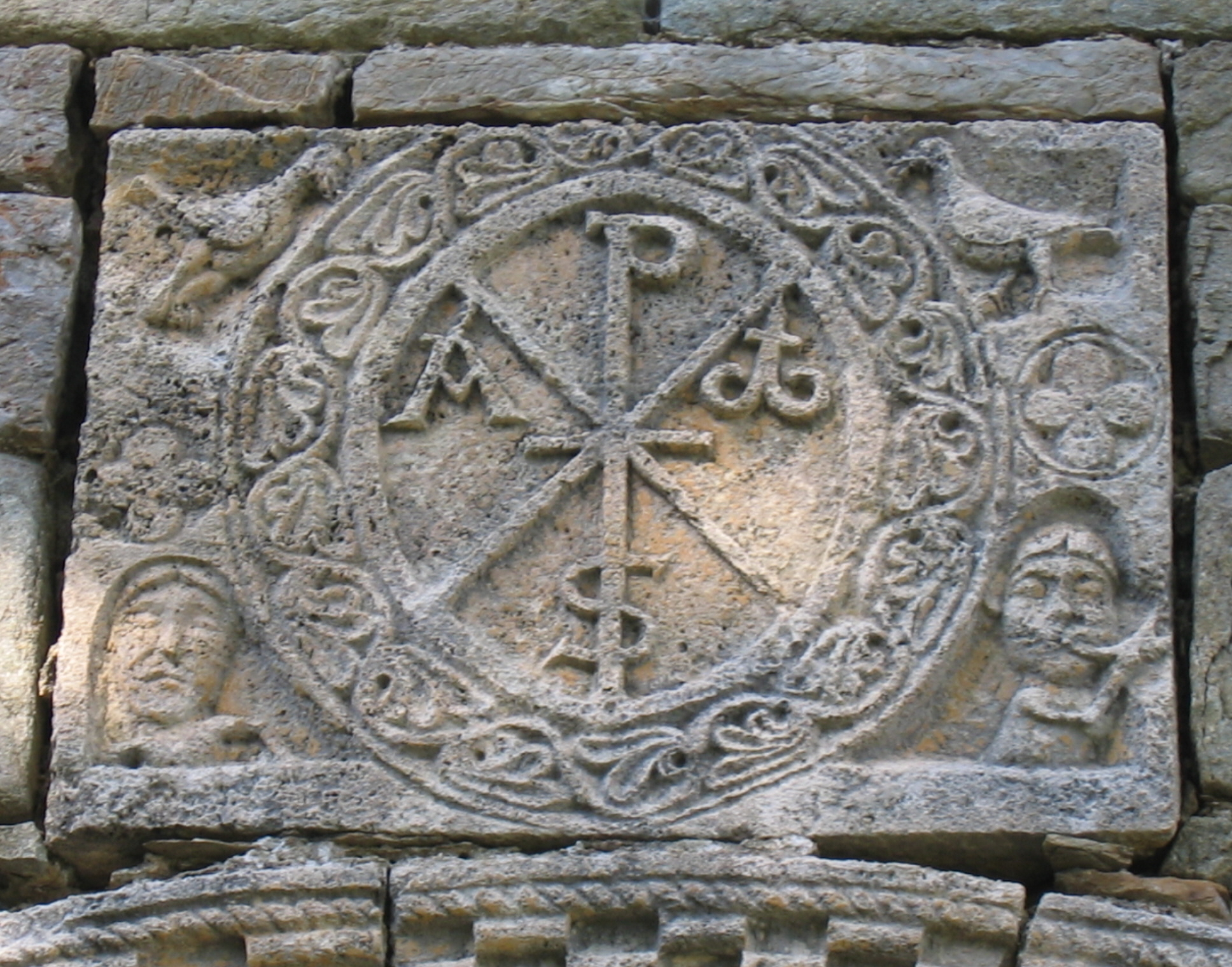
Chi-Rho symbol in relief (12th century), Santa Maria de Cóll church

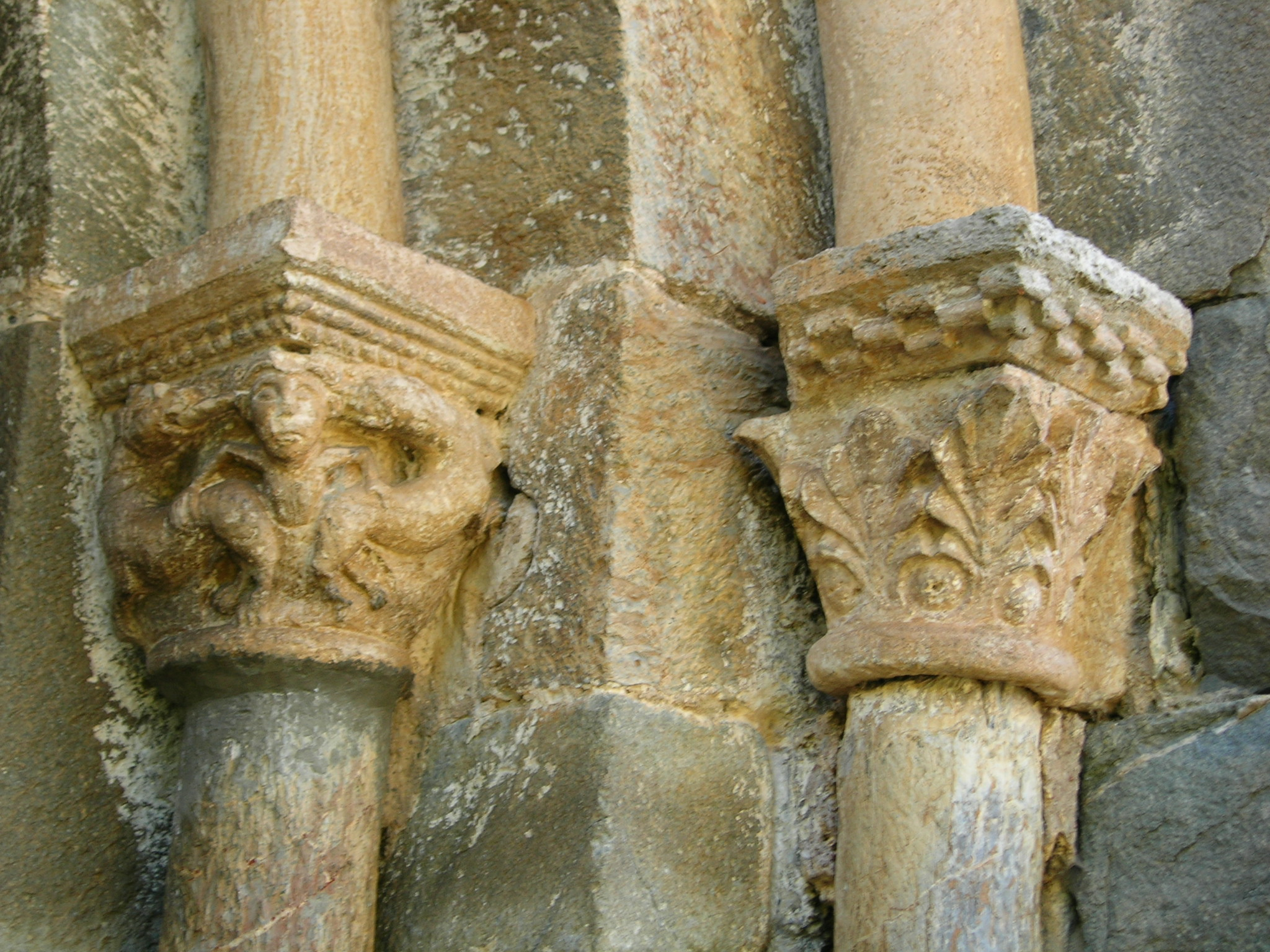
Two capitals on entry door, Santa Maria de Cóll
