= Sant Llorenç prop Bagà =

Former Benedictine monastery in Catalonia, Spain

Coordinates: 42.235164°N 1.875125°E

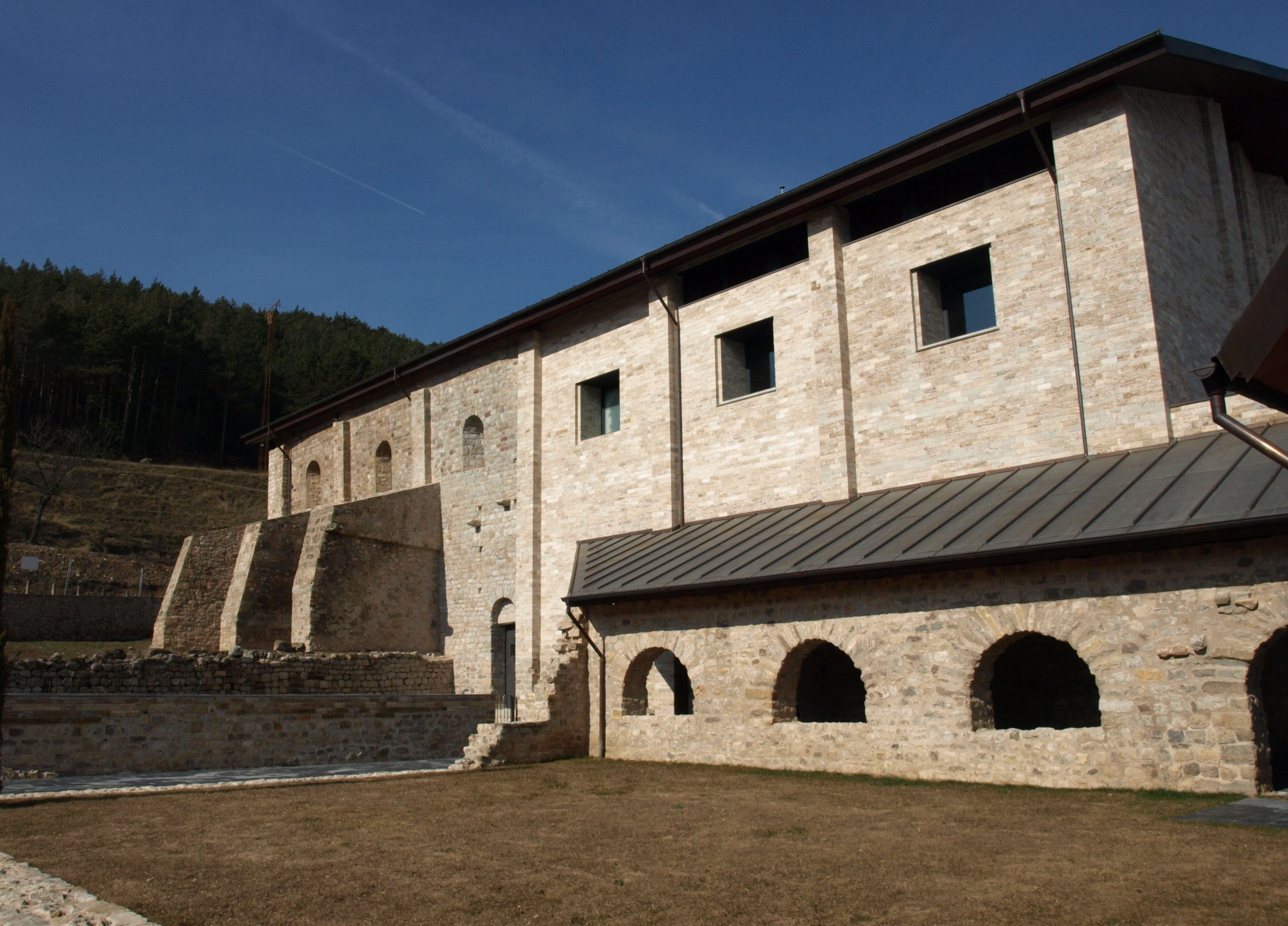
Sant Llorenç prop Bagà

Sant Llorenç prop Bagà is a former Benedictine monastery in Catalonia, Spain. The Romanesque building is located near Guardiola de Berguedà in comarca Berguedà.

== History ==
Documented in the year 898 is a donation of land to a community of monks with an abbot. At the time of its consecration on November 21, 983, there were fifteen monks. It prospered due to large donations made by earls and lords of the area. From the 12th century, the monastery declined. The existence of abbots who did not reside in the monastery added to the debt. In 1592, the priory was converted into the Congregation of Tarragona Claustral and linked to the monastery of Sant Pau del Camp, becoming totally neglected by 1614. Excavation and restoration occurred in the 1980s and 2000s, through Barcelona Provincial Council.

== Architecture and fittings ==
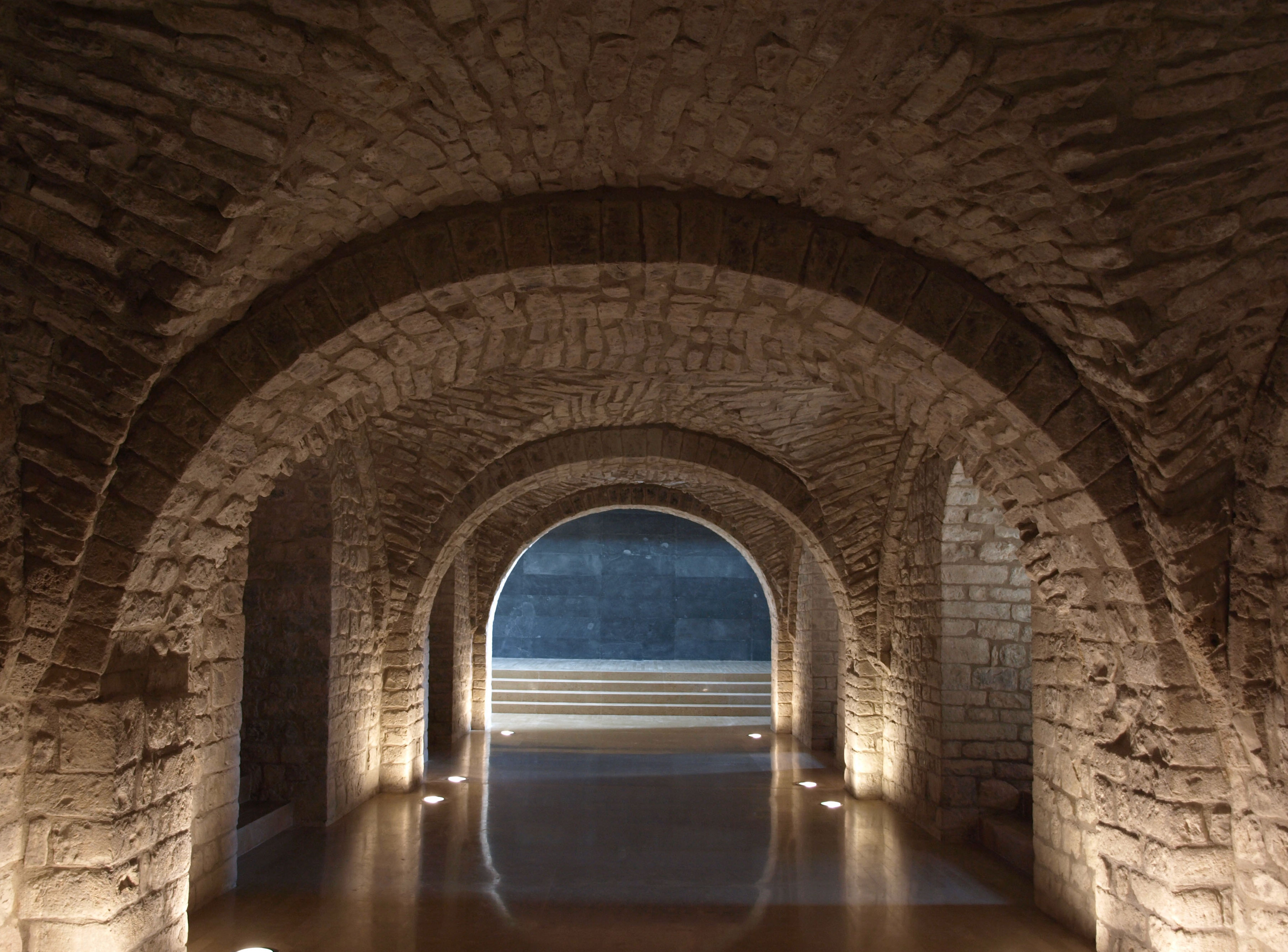
Crypt

The first church was rectangular in shape with three naves separated by columns, a main door on the east side facade, and other building which connected with the monastery. During the 11th century, two semicircular apses were added, the remains of which were found in the excavations of the 1980s. The most important addition occurred in the 12th century which included a platform built in the middle of the nave and beneath it was a crypt adjoining other section various stairwells. Following further reforms in the 18th and 19th centuries, the building was preserved, though half the size of the original. The upper floor is used for worship and the nave has a barrel vault with various windows arches. Only the walls remain of the cloister and monastic rooms.

== Bibliography ==
- Pladevall, Antoni (2001). Guies Catalunya Romànica, El Berguedà. Barcelona, Pòrtic. ISBN 84 7306 697 9 (in Catalán).
