= Pietro di Giacomo Cataneo =

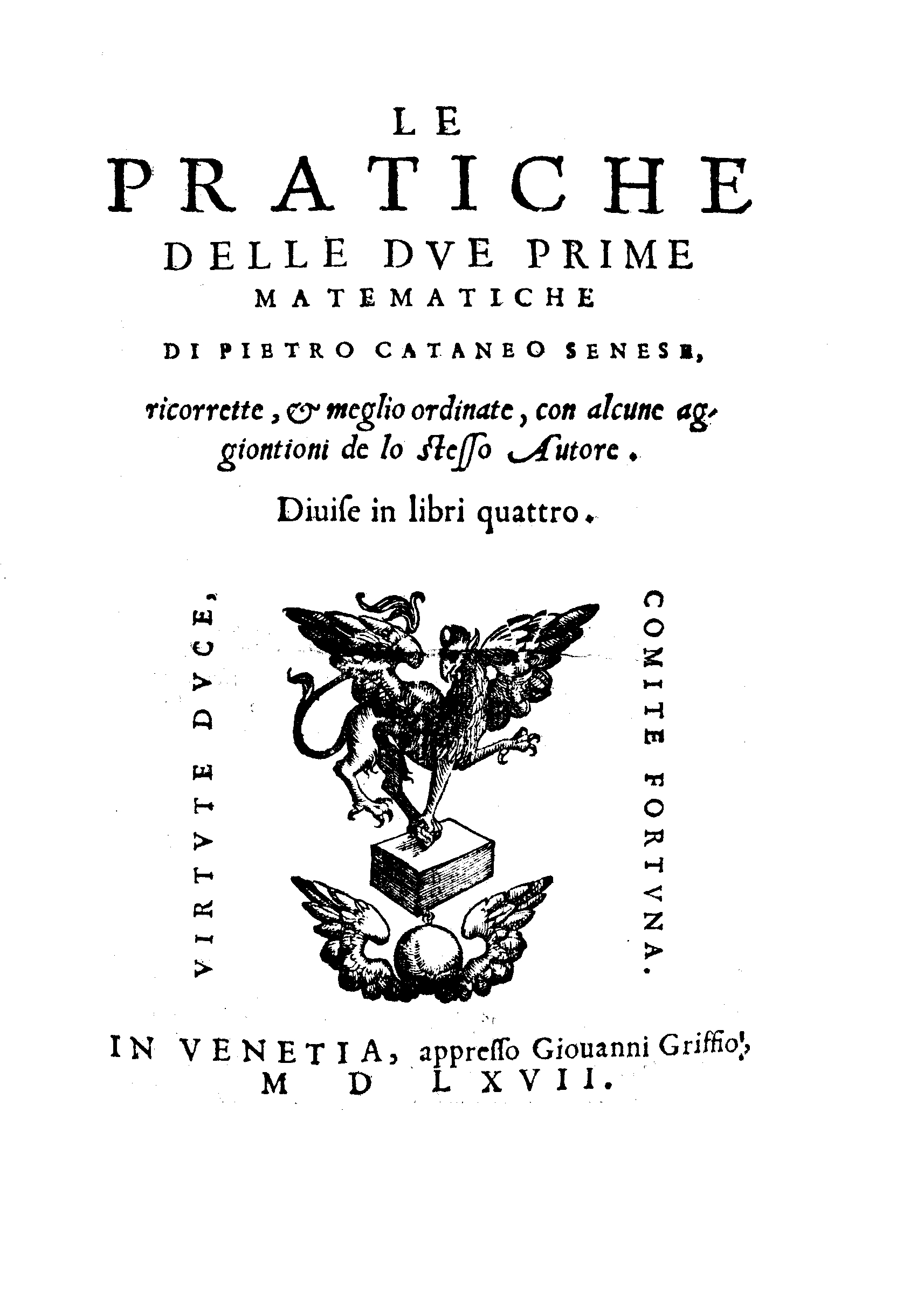
Pratiche delle due prime matematiche, 1567

Pietro di Giacomo Cataneo (c. 1510 in Siena-c. 1574) was a 16th-century Italian architect.

He is principally remembered for his I Quattro Primi Libri di Architettura (1554), a set of four books on architectural theory. In order, the books cover the design of fortified cities, materials, ecclesiastical architecture and domestic architecture. His work on the design of cities was influential, having been cited by Andrea Palladio and elaborated on by Scamozzi and Vasari. His plan for an 'ideal city' is said to have influenced Richard Newcourt's proposal for the rebuilding of London after the Great Fire, as well as the design of cities such as Philadelphia and Savannah. The plan also bears a strong resemblance to the CBD of Adelaide.

== Related links ==
Pietro Cataneo on Wikimedia commons
