= Siege of Lleida (1149) =

Catalan victory in the Reconquista

- Part of the Reconquista
Date	March/April 1149 – 24 October 1149
Location	Lleida
Result	Catalan victory

Belligerents
County of Barcelona; County of Urgell	Almoravid Emirate

Commanders and leaders
Ramon Berenguer IV; Ermengol VI of Urgell	al-Muẓāffar ibn Sulaymān

The siege of Lleida (Lérida, Lārida) by a Catalan army led by Count Ramon Berenguer IV of Barcelona lasted from the spring of 1149 until 24 October, when the Almoravid garrison surrendered on terms, which also included the surrender of the nearby towns of Fraga and Mequinenza (Miknāsa).

== Primary sources ==
Although strategically significant, the capture of Lleida drew less attention than the siege of Tortosa, which involved international contingents as part of the Second Crusade. At least one later source does, however, treat the 1149 siege as a crusade, attributing the victory "to the faith and worship of our Lord Jesus Christ". In fact, the campaign of 1149 was "part of the continuum of armed conflict with Muslims" along the frontier and thus a matter of primarily local interest, although papal policy clearly admitted of spiritual benefits to participants.

No detailed contemporary account of the siege survives. They are mentioned in several chronicles. The Annales Dertusenses anni 1210 date the fall of Lleida and Fraga to the ninth kalends of November (i.e., 24 October) of the Era 1187, AD 1149. The Cronicón Barcinonense segundo agrees, but the Chronicon alterum Riuipullense misdates the event to the ninth kalends of October, which is 23 September. The fall of Mequinenza is mentioned in the Anales Toledanos primeros. In addition to the chronicles, several surviving documents are dated by the siege, showing that the count of Barcelona was present throughout.

== Siege ==
=== Planning ===
Preparations for the conquest of Lleida began in 1148. With the conquest of Tortosa, it formed a single concerted campaign spread across two years. Much of the planning involved the disposition of lands in and around Lleida among the leaders of the army. The Lleidan castles of Montagut, Alcarràs, Soses, Gebut, Aitona, Carratalà, Seròs, Alguaire, Almenar or Alcoletge were all allocated before the conquest.

In accordance with an agreement reached at the siege of Tortosa in 1148, Count Ermengol VI of Urgell took part in the campaign against Lleida in return for a third of the conquered territory. The local Templars were granted one fifth. These rewards continued throughout the siege itself, as when Ponç de Santa Fe received the tower of Avincedel, its appurtenances and some houses in the city.

In July 1149, Ramon Berenguer made peace with Kingdom of Navarre, so as to forestall.

=== Operations ===
In late March or early April 1149, Ramon Berenguer laid siege to the city of Lleida. He probably made his camp in Gardeny. His army consisted of knights drawn from both Catalonia and his fiancée's kingdom of Aragon. He also received assistance from the Templars of Monzón, whose militia may have made up the majority of the army. Nicholas Breakspear, abbot of Saint-Ruf and the future Pope Adrian IV, was present at the siege.

Lleida was defended by its wālī, al-Muẓāffar ibn Sulaymān, who may have belonged to the Banū Hūd. The duration of the siege indicates that there was serious resistance and heavy combat. Lleida itself "must have been half-destroyed". The final resistance of the garrison of Lleida took place in the citadel or suda. The city was captured on 24 October 1149. On the same day as Lleida surrendered, the towns of Fraga and Mequinenza capitulated on the same terms.

== Result ==
The Muslim inhabitants of Lleida were granted the same terms as those of Tortosa the previous year and those of Zaragoza in 1118. This was a contract that stipulated that the Muslims would hand over the mosque and move outside the town walls but otherwise retain their rights and communal autonomy. In January 1150, Ramon Berenguer IV and Ermengol granted fueros to Lleida. Ramon Berenguer took the title marquis of Lleida and, acting as sovereign, granted the city to Ermengol in fief. Other castles in the conquered territory included Alguaire, Albesa, Almenar, Algerri and Alfarràs. The enfeoffment of Ermengol fulfilled the agreement reached in 1148.

== Works cited ==
- Barton, Thomas W. (2019). Victory's Shadow: Conquest and Governance in Medieval Catalonia. Cornell University Press. ISBN 9781501736162.
- Beckmann, Gustav A. (2023). Onomastics of the "Chanson de Roland", Or: Why Gaston Paris and Joseph Bédier Were Both Right. Translated by Linda Archibald. De Gruyter.
- Bolòs, Jordi (2001). "Changes and Survival: The Territory of Lleida (Catalonia) after the Twelfth-century Conquest". Journal of Medieval History. 27 (4): 313–329. doi:10.1016/s0304-4181(01)00017-3.
- Bosch Vilá, Jacinto (1986). "Lārida". In Bosworth, C. E.; van Donzel, E.; Lewis, B. & Pellat, Ch. (eds.). The Encyclopaedia of Islam, Second Edition. Volume V: Khe–Mahi. Leiden: E. J. Brill. pp. 682–683. ISBN 978-90-04-07819-2.
- Catlos, Brian A. (2014). Muslims of Medieval Latin Christendom, c.1050–1614. Cambridge University Press.
- Constable, Giles (1953). "The Second Crusade as Seen by Contemporaries" (PDF). Traditio. 9: 213–279. JSTOR 27830277.
- Fuguet Sans, Joan (2021). "The Templar Castles of Barberà, Gardeny, and Miravet: Status Questionis". In Jochen Burgtorf; Shlomo Lotan; Enric Mallorquí-Ruscalleda (eds.). The Templars: The Rise, Fall, and Legacy of a Military Religious Order. Routledge. pp. 126–157.
- Iranzo Abellán, Salvador; Martín-Iglesias, José Carlos (2015). "Los Annales Dertusenses anni 1210 (olim Chronicon Dertusense II) Díaz 1188): edición, traducción, análisis lingüístico y estudio histórico". Euphrosyne. 43: 265–293.
- Jaspert, Nikolas (2001). "Capta est Dertosa clavis Christianorum: Tortosa and the Crusades" (PDF). In Jonathan Phillips; Martin Hoch (eds.). The Second Crusade: Scope and Consequences. Manchester University Press. pp. 90–100.
- Lladonosa i Pujol, Josep (1974). Lérida medieval. Vol. I: Siglos XII–XIII. Dilagro.
- Pita Mercé, Rodrigo (1974). Lérida árabe. Vol. I. Dilagro.
- Pascual Ramos, Eduardo (2000). "Estudio comparativo de la carta de población de Tortosa (1149), carta de población de Lleida (1150) y la carta de franquicia de Mallorca (1230)". Espacio, Tiempo y Forma. 13: 305–323.
- Smith, D. J. (2003). "The Abbot-Crusader: Nicholas Breakspear in Catalonia". In Bolton, B.; Duggan, A. (eds.). Adrian IV, the English Pope, 1154–1159: Studies and Texts. Aldershot: Ashgate. pp. 29–39. ISBN 978-0-75460-708-3.
- Vones-Liebenstein, Ursula (1996). Saint Ruf und Spanien: Studien zur Verbreitung und zum Wirken der Regularkanoniker von Saint Ruf in Avignon auf der Iberischen Halbinsel (11. und 12. Jahrhundert). Brepols.
- Ubieto Arteta, Antonio (1981). Historia de Aragón, I: La formación territorial. Anubar.
