= House of Santcliment =

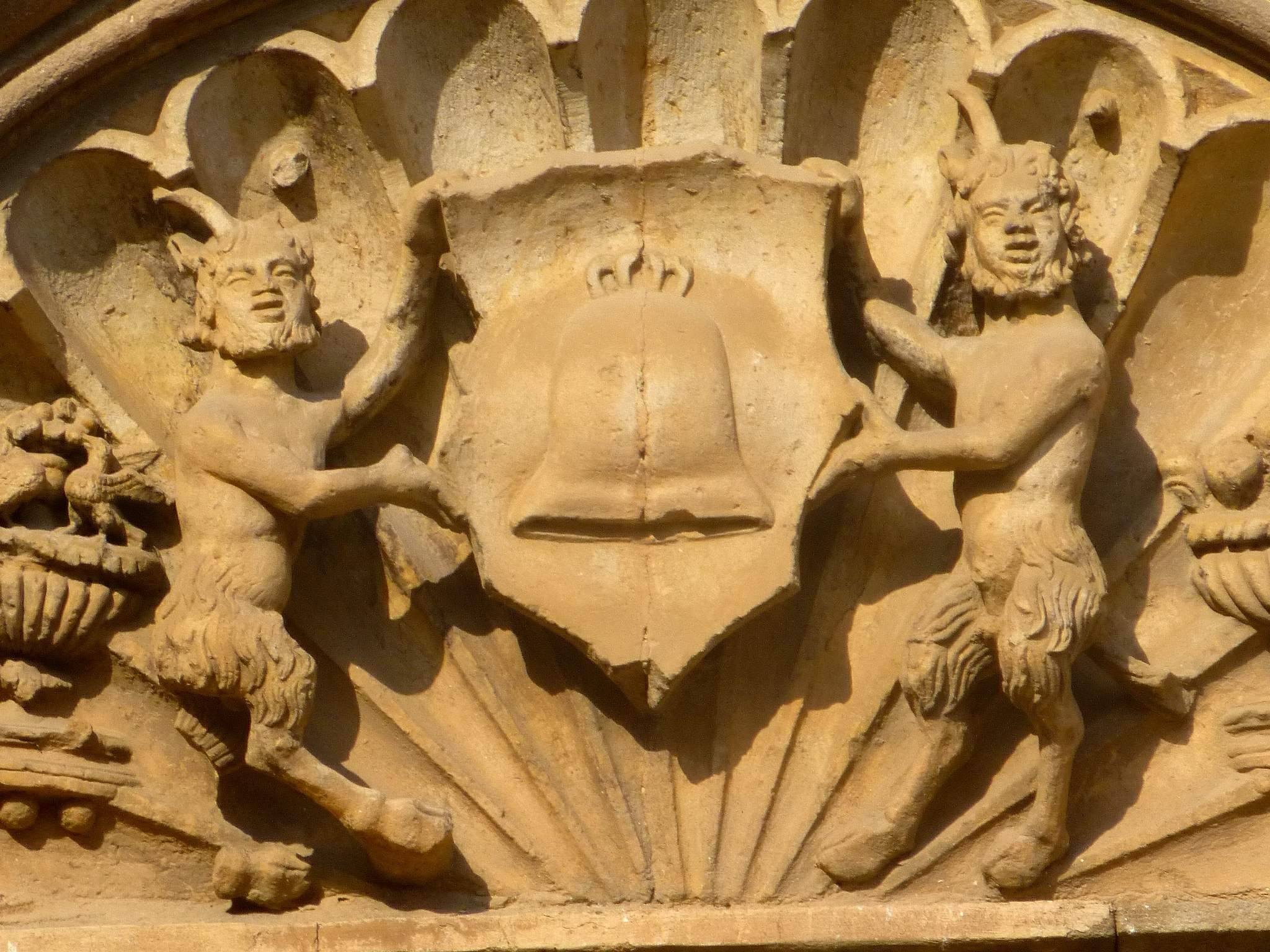
Arms of the House of Santcliment.

The House of Santcliment was an aristocratic and noble Catalan house established by Tomàs de Santcliment, Lord of Mequinenza, between 1230 and 1244. He was granted authority by James I of Aragon over the castles of Cinca, Malda, and Maldanell as a reward for his participation in the conquest of Valencia.

== History ==
=== Lleida branch ===
In the fourteenth century, members of the Leida branch lived on Carrer Major of Lleida and governed territories that included Alcarràs, Montagut, Sarroca de Lleida, Llardecans, and Vilanova de Remolins. The house also owned large estates in Flix and La Palma d'Ebre, which were sold to Barcelona in 1398.

Francesc de Santcliment, a notable figure of the Lleida branch of the House of Santcliment, served under Peter IV of Aragon, who sent him as ambassador to Avignon in 1336 and as a defender of the Aran Valley against the bishop of Comminges. Francesc founded the family chapel in the cathedral of Lleida. One of his children, Pere, was chancellor of the University of Lleida (1387-1403), canon, and then bishop of Lleida. His other son Francesc was paer in 1380 and veguer in 1413. The son of Francesc, Bernat de Santcliment, carried out a long lawsuit against the chapter of Lleida due to a dispute over a property near Montagut, which he lost. He also fought in the war against John II of Aragon in 1467 and was paer. By the sixteenth century, this branch was already in decline after losing Alcarrás, Sarroca, and Llardecans.

=== Barcelona branch ===
Pere de Santcliment was the first prominent member of the Santcliment branch in Barcelona. He was mentioned by James I of Aragon as "our scribe." The members of this branch continued to serve as notari major of the chancery under Peter III of Aragon. The court positions held by the House helped this Barcelona branch amass fortune. The Santcliments continued to invest in the purchase of lands in addition to their small lordship near the Catalan capital in order to ensure their relevance to the group of distinguished citizens. The Barcelona branch of the Santcliment had a rich heritage and their legacy can be traced in their properties in and around Barcelona. These include the '’Torre de Bell-lloc in Sant Andreu de Palomar, consisting of mills and farms; the Torre Vella in Badalona and the casa de la Murtra near Santa Coloma. In addition, the Santcliment were granted land holdings after the conquest of Sardinia, and a member of this house was part of Spain's campaign to control the island.

== Prominent members ==
- Francesc de Santcliment, majordomo of John I of Aragon;
- Pere de Santcliment, bishop of Lleida;
- Guillem de Santcliment, Governor of Minorca;
- Frederic de Santcliment, Governor of Minorca;
- Guillem Ramon de Santcliment, ambassador of the Spanish Crown.

== Titles and lordships ==
- Grandee
- Marquis of Santa María de Barbará
- Marquis of la Manresana
- Baron of Gelida
- Baron of Cervelló
- Baron of Sant Vicent
- Baron of Llinars
- Baron of Altafulla
- Baron of Balsareny
- Baron of Sarroca
- Baron of Flix
- Lord of Alcarràs
- Lord of Badalona
- Lord of La Granadella
- Lord of La Palma
- Lord of Vilablareix
- Lord of Maldà
- Lord of Cinca
- Lord of Montagut
- Lord of Viladecans
