= Consuelo Berges =

Spanish translator, journalist, writer and biographer

- Born: Consuelo Berges Rábago; 1899; Ucieda, Ruente, Spain
- Died: 23 December 1988 (aged 89); Madrid, Spain
- Other name: Yasnaia Poliana
- Occupations: Translator, journalist
- Awards: Fray Luis de León Translation Award (1956)

Consuelo Berges Rábago (1899 – 23 December 1988) was a Spanish translator, journalist, writer, and biographer.

== Biography ==
The daughter of a single mother belonging to a family of freethinkers and republicans, Consuelo Berges did not go to school. She was educated by reading everything in the extensive family library, in Spanish and French.

At 15, she moved to Santander, to the home of her father's family, to prepare for the entrance exam to the Normal School of Teachers, whose instructors came from Madrid's Higher School of Teaching, using methods inspired by the new pedagogical theories of the Institución Libre de Enseñanza.

After finishing her training, she worked in Cabezón de la Sal, where she started at the Torre Academy, an initiative of Matilde de la Torre, who did not have a teaching degree, to prepare high school students. There she met Víctor de la Serna, who was an inspector of primary education, and founder of the Santander afternoon newspaper La Región. There Consuelo Berges published her first articles under the pseudonym Yasnaia Poliana, and later in El Sol of Madrid, La Nación of Buenos Aires, and the Revista de las Españas, published by the Ibero-American Union in Madrid. Her views, always controversial, aroused interest in the intellectuals of the time, and she maintained correspondence and friendship with Clara Campoamor, Ricardo Baeza, Eulalia Galvarriato, Concha Méndez, Azorín, José Ortega y Gasset, Rosa Chacel, Waldo Frank, Francisco Ayala, María Zambrano, Max Nordau, and Rafael Cansinos-Asséns.

In December 1926, fed up with Primo de Rivera's dictatorship, she emigrated to Arequipa, Peru, where she stayed with her cousin Julia Gutierrez, owner of the city's only bookstore. She taught grammar at an academy, contributed literary articles to Las Noticias, and gave lectures. In the latter she created a certain controversy, such as the one she gave at the University of San Agustín in 1927, about "The Indianist Myths", in which she had little tolerance for the indifferent fashion of the indigenism subscribed to by American intellectuals, descendants of Hispanics, "without a hint of indigenous blood or desire to assume their responsibilities, blaming everything on the Spanish colonization."

In November 1928, she traveled from Peru to Bolivia and Argentina. She arrived in Buenos Aires, where she wrote for El Diario Español, financed by the Spanish embassy. The ambassador, Ramiro de Maeztu, did his best to weather the incendiary articles Berges wrote against the attempt – proposed by his embassy – to unite the Spanish residents in Argentina into the Spanish Patriotic Union of the dictator Miguel Primo de Rivera.

In 1929, she was appointed director of the Montañés Center's magazine Cantabria, and collaborated with Dr. Avelino Gutiérrez at the Spanish Cultural Institution. She also contributed to the literary supplement of La Nación, directed by Enrique Méndez Calzada, and whose secretary was Guillermo de Torre. He was married to Norah Borges, who was part of her group of friends, along with Alfonsina Storni, Concha Méndez, and Salvadora Leguina.

In 1931, after the proclamation of the Second Republic, she returned to Europe with Méndez and went to Paris, where she was welcomed by her cousin Julia Gutiérrez, who had come from Arequipa with her four children, and her second cousin, the painter María Blanchard. Blanchard had undergone a conversion to Catholicism, like her friend Paul Claudel, and insistently invited the anarchist and anti-clerical Berges to visit churches and attend mass, so she ended up shying away from their relationship.

In the newspapers and magazines to which she contributed, she defended her liberated ideas and the women's vote advocated in the Congress of Deputies by her friend Clara Campoamor, against the opinion of Victoria Kent and those with her who thought that women – under the powerful influence of the church – were not yet in a position to exercise true public autonomy, and would vote mostly conservatively.

At the end of 1931, she arrived in Madrid, summoned by Campoamor, who proposed several positions and destinations in the new Republic, which Berges rejected. She continued writing articles to be able to live, and also to defend her ideas, while working as a librarian at the Archives of the Provincial Charity Board. She collaborated on the publications of the CNT, FAI, and Mujeres Libres. Under the initiation name of Yasnaia, she was a member of the Masonic lodge of Adopción Amor, constituted in Madrid on 2 December 1931 under the auspices of the Mantua lodge and dependent on the Spanish Grand Lodge. Her activities were focused on the achievement of equality of Masonic rights for men and women. In her article entitled "La mujer y la masonería" (Women and Freemasonry), she states:

I cannot fathom by virtue of what conviction it is possible to affirm that a man, when receiving the Masonic light, owns either more preparation or more excellent aptitude than that of a woman.

In 1935, to avoid the censorship of the "black biennium" of Lerroux and Gil-Robles, she clandestinely published her book Explicación de Octubre about the Revolution of 1934, which was widely disseminated in Masonic and revolutionary circles.

In July 1936, with the military uprising, the Provincial Charity Board sent her to take charge of the Guindalera orphanage, which had been abandoned by the nuns. Together with several volunteers, she was able to evacuate the children to save them from the bombings, crossing half of Spain at war, to get to Granollers. Once there, she left the children in the care of her collaborators and went to Barcelona. There, she worked at the magazine of Mujeres Libres with Baltasar Lobo – who created graphic designs and drawings – Rosa Chacel, Soledad Estorach, Carmen Conde, Pepita Carpeña, Sara Berenguer, Suceso Portales, María Jiménez, Concha Liaño, Lola Iturbe, Antonia Fontanillas, and Mercedes Comaposada. She actively supported literacy initiatives (50% of Spanish women were illiterate), information about contraceptive methods, against forced prostitution, offering dignified labor alternatives, and claiming the labor, social, and family rights of women that her revolutionary associates wanted to leave in the background or ignore.

In February 1939, Berges joined the human tide that fled on foot, under bombing, to France. In Portbou, the group was detained outdoors for more than 24 hours, without warm clothes or food, until they were taken to Cerbère, vaccinated, and put on a train to an unknown destination. In Perpignan she managed to flee, but was arrested and taken to another train which arrived two days later, to the capital of the department of Haute-Loire, where she was interned along with more than 600 men, women, and children who had fled Spain only to end up confined in concentration camps.

She escaped again, without papers or money, and arrived in Paris, where her friends Baltasar Lobo and Mercedes Comaposada welcomed her, aided by Picasso. She lived in Paris, in hiding, for four years, and survived by teaching Spanish and writing articles for newspapers and magazines in Argentina. In 1943 she was arrested by the Germans, who upon learning she was undocumented, believed that she was Jewish. During the months she remained in custody, she deliberated between declaring herself a Jew or a Spaniard to avoid being repatriated to Spain. In the end the Germans decided for her, handing her over to the authorities at the Spanish border, who sent her to a concentration camp with other repatriates.

Thanks to the help of her friend Matilde Marquina and her relative Luis de la Serna, who offered to act as guarantors, Berges avoided jail. However, she was not allowed to work as a teacher, nor to write in the press. She could not sign the articles she sent abroad without fear of serious reprisals, and as a last resort, to survive, she translated works from French, by authors such as Saint-Simon, La Bruyère, Flaubert, Proust, Stendhal, and Jean Descola.

For many years, she lived in "internal exile" for her republican preferences, and she struggled to dignify the working conditions of translators, and to claim copyright for translations. In 1955 she founded, together with the Spanish-Chinese translator Marcela de Juan, the Professional Association of Translators and Interpreters.

In 1956, Berges won the Fray Luis de León Award for her translation of Histoire de l'Espagne chrétienne by Jean Descola.

In 1982, she established the Stendhal Translation Award, which, since 1990, has been given for translations from French into Spanish. However, in 1983 she requested a literary creation scholarship from the Ministry of Culture, as a last resort to facilitate her economic subsistence.

Consuelo Berges died in Madrid at age 89. There is a street dedicated to her in Santander.

== Works ==
- Escalas 1930, Buenos Aires, Talleres Gráficos Argentinos, 1930
- Concepción Arenal: Algunas noticias de su vida y obra, Edit Gráf. Maxera y Cia, 1931
- "La mujer y la masonería", Boletín Oficial de la GLE, August–September 1932
- Explicación de Octubre, 1935
- Stendhal. Su vida, su mundo, su obra, Madrid, Aguilar, 1962
- Stendhal y su mundo, Madrid, Alianza Editorial, 1983

=== Selected translations ===
- René Descartes: Las pasiones del alma (Aguilar)
- Jean de La Bruyère: Los caracteres o las costumbres de este siglo (Aguilar)
- Louis de Rouvroy, duc de Saint-Simon:
  - La corte de Luis XIV (Espasa-Calpe)
  - De Duque de Anjou a Rey de las Españas (Aguilar)
  - La Princesa de los Ursinos (Aguilar)
  - Retratos proustianos de cortesanas (Tusquets)
- Jean-Jacques Rousseau: El contrato social (Aguilar)
- Jean le Rond d'Alembert: Discurso preliminar de la Enciclopedia (Orbis)
- Stendhal:
  - Obras Completas (Aguilar)
  - Armancia (Alianza Editorial)
  - Rojo y negro (Alianza Editorial)
  - La cartuja de Parma (Alianza Editorial)
  - Crónicas italianas (Alianza Editorial)
  - Del amor (Alianza Editorial)
  - Ernestina o El nacimiento del amor (Alianza Editorial)
  - Lamiel (Alianza Editorial)
  - Luciano Leuwen (Alianza Editorial)
  - Paseos por Roma (Alianza Editorial)
  - Vida de Henry Brulard. Recuerdos de egotismo (Alianza Editorial)
  - Vida de Mozart (Alba Editorial)
  - Vida de Rossini followed by Notas de un "dilettante" (Aguilar)
  - Relatos (Salvat)
  - Napoleón (Aguilar)
  - Vanina Vanini y otros cuentos (Bruguera)
  - Una interpretación sensual del arte (Tusquets)
- Honoré de Balzac: Un asunto tenebroso (Salvat)
- Gustave Flaubert:
  - Madame Bovary (Alianza Editorial)
  - Un alma de Dios (Plaza & Janés).
  - Tres cuentos. Diccionario de tópicos (Bruguera)
- Auguste Comte: Curso de filosofía. Discurso sobre el espíritu positivo (Aguilar)
- Marcel Proust:
  - En busca del tiempo perdido. 4: Sodoma y Gomorra; 5: La prisionera; 6: La fugitiva; 7: El tiempo recobrado (Alianza Editorial)
  - Jean Santeuil (2 vols., Alianza Editorial)
  - Los placeres y los días. Parodias y misceláneas (Alianza Editorial)
- Waldemar Bonsels: Viaje a la India (Aguilar)
- Henri Focillon: El año mil (Alianza Editorial)
- Georges Bernanos: Un mal sueño (Luis de Caralt)
- André Breton: Magia cotidiana (Editorial Fundamentos)
- Jean Sermet: España del sur. Andalucía y Extremadura (Editorial Juventud)
- Jean Descola:
  - Historia de la España cristiana (Aguilar)
  - Los conquistadores del Imperio español (Editorial Juventud)
  - Historia de España (Editorial Juventud)
  - Los libertadores (Editorial Juventud)
  - Cristóbal Colón (Editorial Juventud)
  - Hernán Cortés (Editorial Juventud)
- Mouloud Mammeri: La colina olvidada (Luis de Caralt)
- Annette Vaillant: Bonnard o el gozo de ver (Alianza Editorial)
