= Josep Maria Batlle i Farran =

Spanish politician (1949–2021)

Member of the Senate of Spain
- In office 4 September 2002 – 26 September 2011
- Constituency: Lleida

Mayor of Puigverd de Lleida
- In office 20 April 1979 – 24 May 2003

Personal details
- Born: 13 October 1949 Puigverd de Lleida, Spain
- Died: 10 May 2021 (aged 71) Puigverd de Lleida, Spain
- Party: PSC–PSOE

Josep Maria Batlle i Farran (13 October 1949 – 10 May 2021) was a Spanish politician and rancher.

== Biography ==
A member of the Socialists' Party of Catalonia (PSC–PSOE), Farran was elected Mayor of Puigverd de Lleida in the 1979 Spanish local elections, a position he held until 2003. He also served on the Provincial Council of Lleida from 1987 to 2003.

Farran was chosen to represent the Province of Lleida as part of the Catalan Agreement of Progress in the 2000 Spanish general election, as well as 2004 and 2008. He served in the Senate of Spain from 2002 to 2011 and served on the Agriculture, Livestock, and Fisheries Committee. He also served on the joint commission Spanish Ombudsman.

Farran died in a tractor accident in Puigverd de Lleida on 10 May 2021 at the age of 71.
