= Segrià =

Coordinates: 41°37′N 0°37′E

- Comarca
- Flag Coat of arms

- Country: Spain
- Autonomous community: Catalonia
- Region: Ponent
- Province: Lleida
- Capital: Lleida
- Municipalities: List: Aitona, Els Alamús, Albatàrrec, Alcanó, Alcarràs, Alcoletge, Alfarràs, Alfés, Alguaire, Almacelles, Almatret, Almenar, Alpicat, Artesa de Lleida, Aspa, Benavent de Segrià, Corbins, Gimenells i el Pla de la Font, La Granja d'Escarp, Llardecans, Lleida, Maials, Massalcoreig, Montoliu de Lleida, La Portella, Puigverd de Lleida, Rosselló, Sarroca de Lleida, Seròs, Soses, Sudanell, Sunyer, Torre-serona, Torrebesses, Torrefarrera, Torres de Segre, Vilanova de Segrià, Vilanova de la Barca

Government
  - Body: Segrià Comarcal Council
  - President: David Masot (Impulsem Lleida–Junts)

Area
  - Total: 1,396.4 km^{2} (539.2 sq mi)

Population (2014)
  - Total: 209,768
  - Density: 150.22/km^{2} (389.07/sq mi)
- Demonym
- Time zone: UTC+1 (CET)
  - Summer (DST): UTC+2 (CEST)
- Largest municipality: Lleida

Segrià (Western Catalan: [seɣɾiˈa]) is a comarca (county) in Catalonia (Spain). It is located in the western region of Ponent, bordering Aragon. As of 2001, over two thirds of its population live in the capital city of Lleida, which is also Catalonia's sixth largest municipality, and remains the most populated comarca in the Ponent region and the Lleida province. It takes its name from the river Segre.

== Municipalities ==
Municipality	Population (2014)	Area km^{2}
Aitona	2,415	66.9
Els Alamús	769	20.5
Albatàrrec	2,139	10.5
Alcanó	242	21.0
Alcarràs	9,252	114.3
Alcoletge	3,270	16.7
Alfarràs	3,003	11.4
Alfés	315	31.9
Alguaire	3,093	50.1
Almacelles	6,699	49.0
Almatret	333	56.8
Almenar	3,547	66.6
Alpicat	6,297	15.3
Artesa de Lleida	1,508	23.9
Aspa	215	10.2
Benavent de Segrià	1,516	7.4
Corbins	1,400	21.0
Gimenells i el Pla de la Font	1,129	55.8
La Granja d'Escarp	972	38.5
Llardecans	497	66.0
Lleida	139,176	212.3
Maials	959	57.1
Massalcoreig	560	14.1
Montoliu de Lleida	515	7.3
La Portella	750	12.3
Puigverd de Lleida	1,411	12.5
Rosselló	3,021	9.9
Sarroca de Lleida	403	42.2
Seròs	1,887	85.8
Soses	1,754	30.2
Sudanell	872	8.7
Sunyer	307	12.7
Torre-serona	388	5.9
Torrebesses	291	27.4
Torrefarrera	4,512	23.5
Torres de Segre	2,301	50.6
Vilanova de la Barca	1,120	21.6
Vilanova de Segrià	930	8.5
• Total: 38	209,768	1,396.4
