= Oriol Lozano =

Spanish footballer

Oriol
Personal information
- Full name: Oriol Lozano Farrán
- Date of birth: 23 May 1981 (age 45)
- Place of birth: Sudanell, Spain
- Height: 1.83 m (6 ft 0 in)
- Position: Defender

Youth career
- 1997–1998: Lleida

Senior career*
Years	Team	Apps	(Gls)
1998–2001	Lleida	39	(0)
2001–2002	Onda	30	(1)
2002–2003	Hospitalet	28	(0)
2003–2004	Racing B	16	(0)
2004–2010	Racing Santander	119	(1)
2010–2011	Aris	8	(1)
2011–2012	Murcia	23	(0)
2013	Zestaponi	7	(0)
2013–2015	Racing Santander	15	(0)
Total		285	(3)

International career
2001	Spain U20	1	(0)

Managerial career
- 2019–2020: Bengaluru (assistant)
- * Club domestic league appearances and goals

Oriol Lozano Farrán (born 23 May 1981), known simply as Oriol, is a Spanish former footballer who played usually as a central defender.

During a 17-year professional career he played mainly for Racing de Santander, representing the club in all three major levels and appearing in 156 competitive matches whilst competing in six La Liga seasons.

== Club career ==
Born in Sudanell, Lleida, Catalonia, Oriol played spent his early career with UE Lleida, CD Onda (in the fourth division, loaned by Villarreal CF who acted as Onda's parent club) and CE L'Hospitalet. In the 2004–05 season he was promoted from Racing de Santander's reserves, making his La Liga debut on 19 September 2004 in a 1–1 home draw against Villarreal.

Oriol went on to become a relatively important defensive element for the Cantabrians in the subsequent four seasons, playing a total of 75 games and starting 65. On 17 March 2007 he scored one of only three official goals for the club, in a 2–0 away win over Valencia CF.

Oriol appeared in 19 matches in the 2009–10 campaign, as Racing once again narrowly avoided relegation after finishing 16th – he was sent off twice, one of them in the last minute of the 1–0 defeat of Sporting de Gijón. In June 2010, the 29-year-old did not see his contract renewed and signed with Aris Thessaloniki F.C. of the Super League Greece.

Before retiring in 2015 at the age of 34, Oriol represented Real Murcia, FC Zestaponi (Georgian Erovnuli Liga) and Racing again. In September 2019 he joined Indian Super League side Bengaluru FC, as assistant manager under his compatriot Carles Cuadrat. The following January, he was replaced by goalkeeping coach Javier Pinillos.
