= Rosselló, Spain =

Rosselló
- Municipality
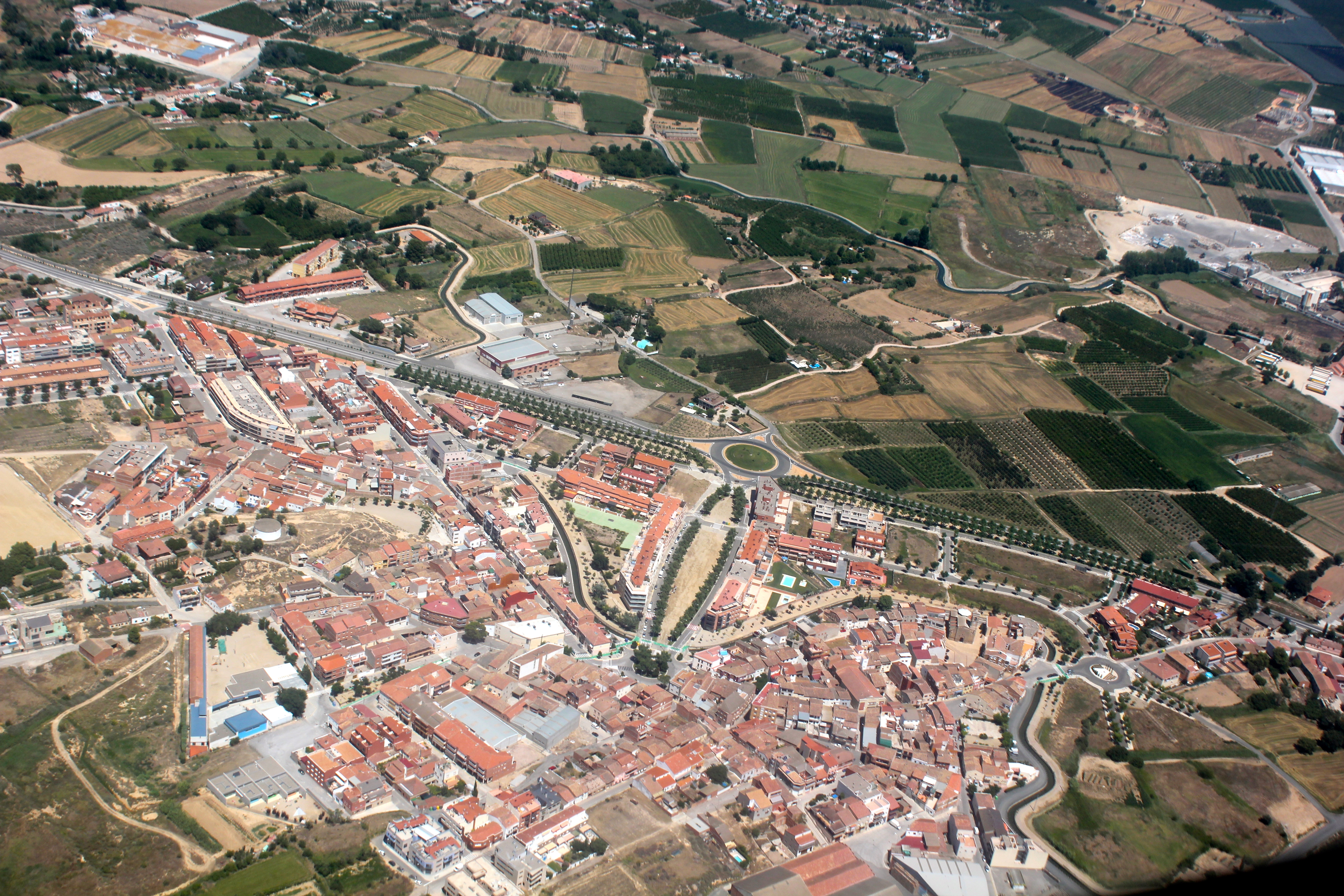

- Flag Coat of arms

- Location in Catalonia
- Coordinates: 41.695°N 0.596°E
- Country: Spain
- Autonomous Community: Catalonia
- Comarca: Segrià
- Province: Lleida

Government
  - Mayor: Josep Abad Fernández (2015)

Area
  - Total: 9.9 km^{2} (3.8 sq mi)
- Elevation: 252 m (827 ft)

Population (2025-01-01)
  - Total: 3,416
  - Density: 350/km^{2} (890/sq mi)
- Postal code: 25124
- Website: www.rossello.cat

Rosselló (Catalan pronunciation: [roseˈʎo]) is a village in the province of Lleida and autonomous community of Catalonia, Spain. It is in the comarca (county) of Segrià.

It has a population of 3,416 (register office, 2025).
