= La Portella =

- Municipality
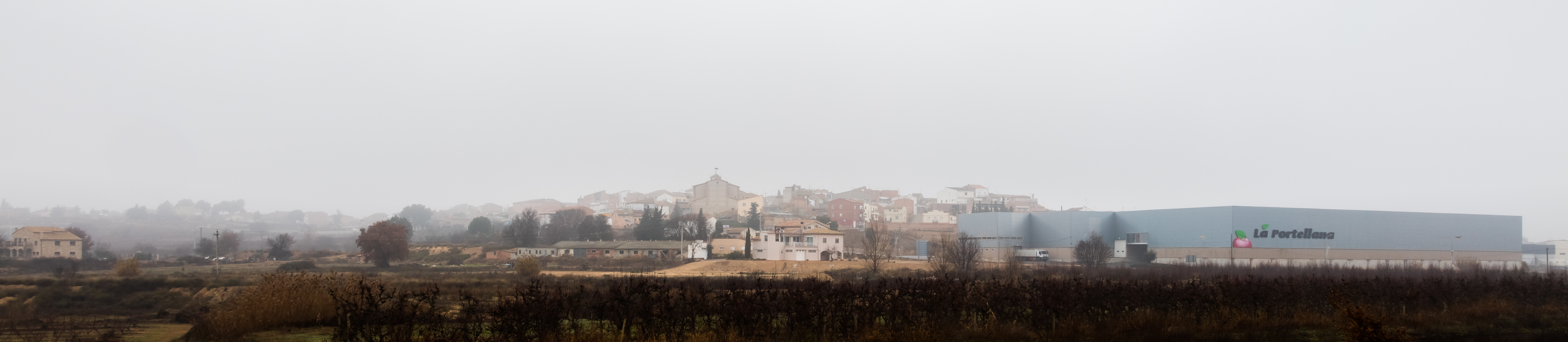

- Flag Coat of arms

- Location in Catalonia
- Coordinates: 41°44′28″N 0°38′30″E
- Country: Spain
- Community: Catalonia
- Province: Lleida
- Comarca: Segrià

Government
  - Mayor: Miquel Carles Català Visa (2015)

Area
  - Total: 12.3 km^{2} (4.7 sq mi)
- Elevation: 259 m (850 ft)

Population (2025-01-01)
  - Total: 731
  - Density: 59.4/km^{2} (154/sq mi)
- Demonym(s): Portellà, portellana
- Website: laportella.cat

La Portella (Catalan pronunciation: [la poɾˈteʎɛ]) is a municipality in the comarca of the Segrià in Catalonia, Spain. It is situated on the right bank of the Noguera Ribagorçana river. A local road links the municipality with Lleida.

== Demography ==
It has a population of 731 (register office, 2025).

1900	1930	1950	1970	1986	2001
520	600	395	720	634	643

== Note ==
1. La Portella became part of the Segrià in the comarcal revision of 1990: previously it formed part of the Noguera.
