= Aspa, Spain =

Aspa
- Municipality
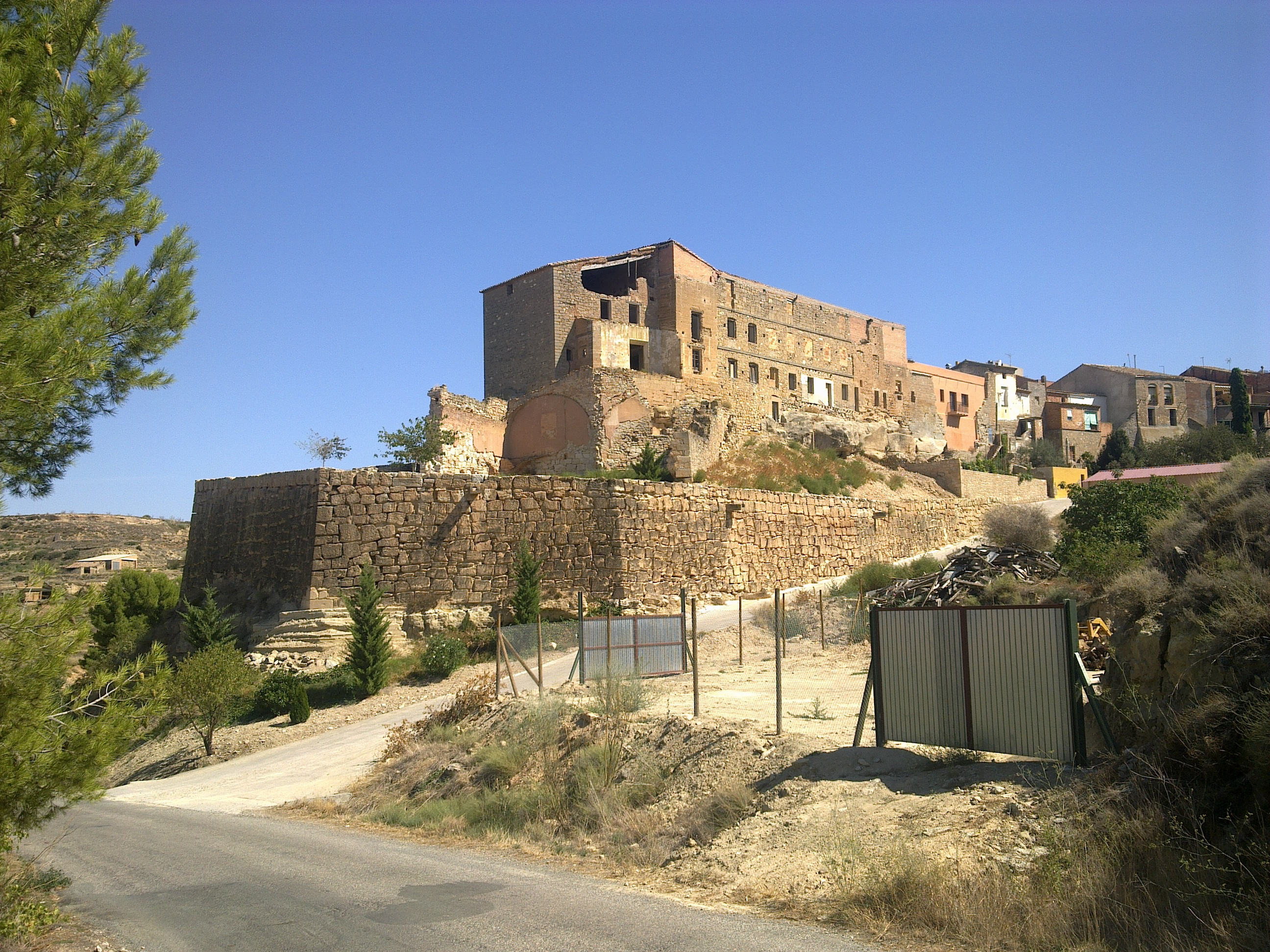
- Castell-palau d'Aspa

- Flag Coat of arms

- Location in Catalonia
- Coordinates: 41°30′N 0°40′E
- Country: Spain
- Community: Catalonia
- Province: Lleida
- Comarca: Segrià

Government
  - Mayor: Maria José Invernon Módol (2015)

Area
  - Total: 10.2 km^{2} (3.9 sq mi)
- Elevation: 256 m (840 ft)

Population (2025-01-01)
  - Total: 233
  - Density: 22.8/km^{2} (59.2/sq mi)
- Website: aspa.ddl.net

Aspa (Catalan pronunciation: [ˈaspa]) is a village in the province of Lleida and autonomous community of Catalonia, Spain.

It has a population of 233 (register office, 2025).
