= Artesa de Lleida =

- Municipality
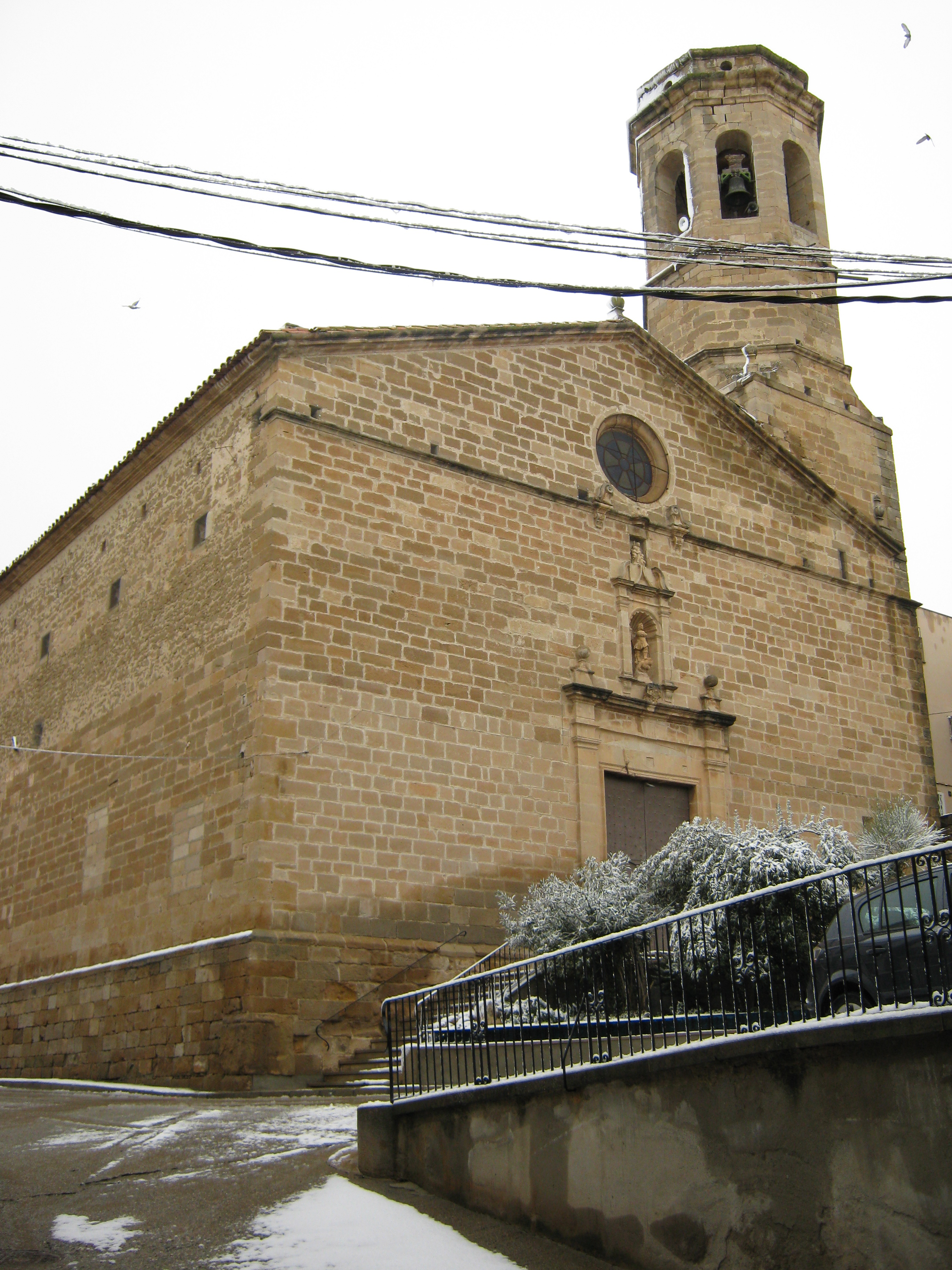
- Artesa church

- Coat of arms

- Location in Catalonia
- Coordinates: 41°33′14″N 0°42′11″E
- Country: Spain
- Community: Catalonia
- Province: Lleida
- Comarca: Segrià

Government
  - Mayor: Pere Puiggrós Compte (2015)

Area
  - Total: 23.9 km^{2} (9.2 sq mi)
- Elevation: 202 m (663 ft)

Population (2025-01-01)
  - Total: 1,543
  - Density: 64.6/km^{2} (167/sq mi)
- Website: artesalleida.ddl.net

Artesa de Lleida (Catalan pronunciation: [aɾˈtezɛ ðe ˈʎejða]) is a village in the comarca of Segrià and autonomous community of Catalonia, Spain.

It has a population of 1,543 (register office, 2025).
