= Soledad Estorach =

Catalan anarcha-feminist

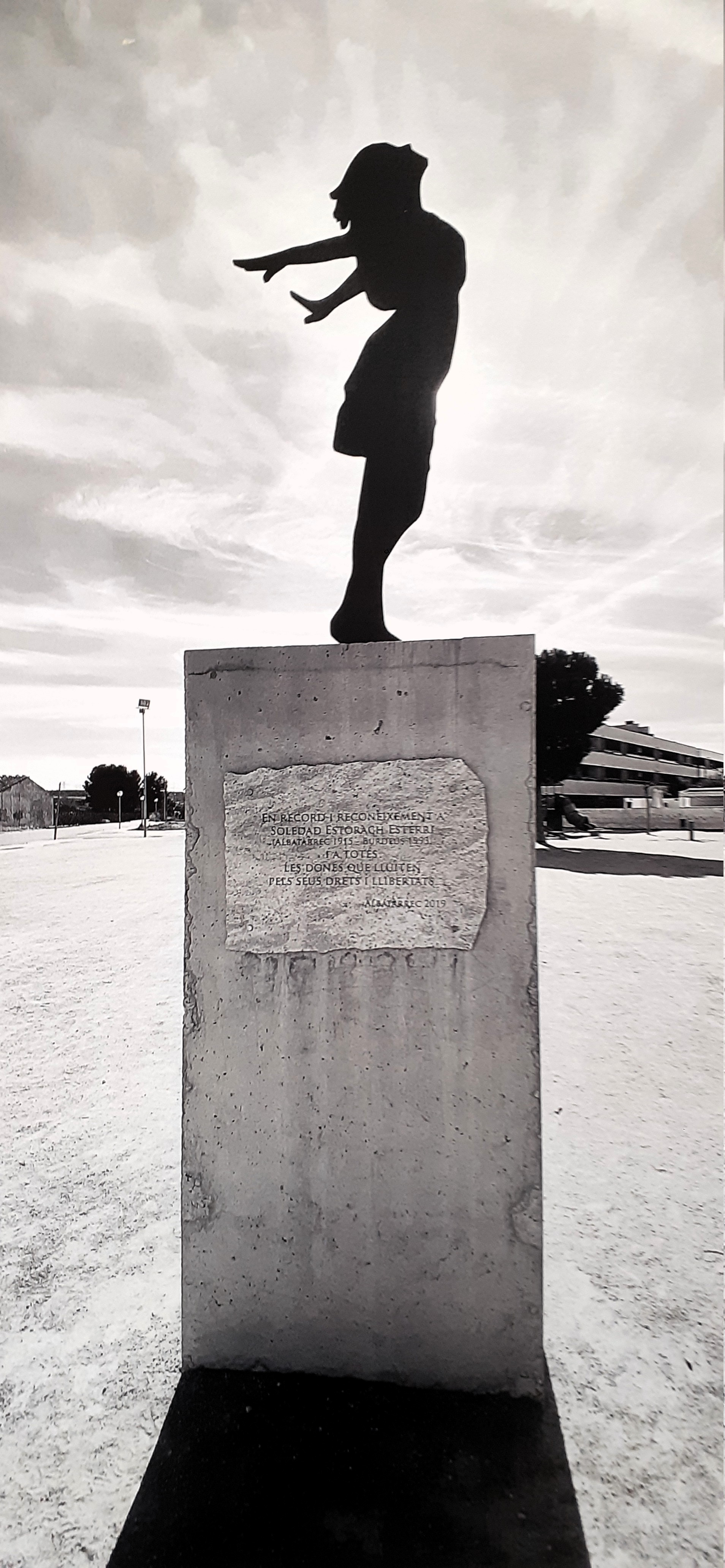
- Born: Soledad Estorach Esterri; 6 February 1915; Albatàrrec, Lleida, Spain
- Died: 14 March 1993 (aged 78); Paris, France
- Organizations: Confederación Nacional del Trabajo; Mujeres Libres; PCI-SFQI
- Movement: Anarcha-feminism

Soledad Estorach Esterri (6 February 1915 – 14 March 1993) was a Catalan anarcha-feminist and activist. She co-founded the Catalan branch of Mujeres Libres, and during part of her French exile was a member of the Trotskyist PCI-SFQI. She contributed to the publications Tierra y Libertad, Mujeres Libres and La Vérité and to the collectively-written book, Mujeres Libres. Luchadoras libertarias.

== Biography ==
=== Early years ===
Estorach was born in Albatàrrec, in the province of Lleida, on 6 February 1915. Her mother came from a religious landowning family while her father, an atheist, was an adult-education teacher who had lived abroad for many years.

Her father taught her read and write, which was uncommon for working-class girls at the time, and shaped her political views through his progressive ideas. When he died, she had to start work at the age of eleven. At fifteen, she persuaded her mother to allow her to move to Barcelona, where she could earn more money and continue her education.

Upon arriving in Barcelona, she initially worked in her uncle's workshop, but it closed during the Great Depression. She then briefly worked as a maid, but the long hours and low pay quickly convinced her to seek work in a factory, which offered better wages and more time for studying.

In 1930, Estorach worked in a factory by day and attended a night school, where she became involved in the trade union activities of the Confederación Nacional del Trabajo (CNT), which was still operating underground because of laws that had been imposed earlier by the Primo de Rivera dictatorship.

=== Activism during the Second Republic and the Civil War ===
After the proclamation of the Second Spanish Republic in 1931, Estorach joined a youth activist group at an ateneo libertario (libertarian cultural group) and began attending and organising meetings.

In 1934, following internal debates about the difficulties faced by women within the CNT, a group of young women, including Estorach, formed a mutual aid network, which they called the Women's Cultural Group (Agrupación Cultural Femenina). In Estorach’s words:

eran compañeras que se habían adherido a una causa, no contra el padre o el hermano, sino con ellos contra la Sociedad

[female comrades who had committed themselves to a cause, not against their fathers or brothers, but together with them against Society]

The group, however, did not have the support of the entire anarchist community, as some sectors considered it unnecessary.

In 1936, the group held a rally at the Teatre Circ Olympia. Although the other libertarian organisations did little to publicise it, the theatre was packed, and those present laid the foundations for a regional women's organisation. They later made contact with the Mujeres Libres group in Madrid and became the organisation's Catalan branch. Estorach was appointed coordinator of activities in Barcelona, and, with her colleagues, she launched an awareness-raising and direct-action campaign that included women’s networks, meetings to analyse problems and devise strategies for tackling them, and home-based childcare services to encourage mothers’ participation. She was also responsible for raising funds for the group’s activities from the CNT and the Federación Anarquista Ibérica (FAI), which she obtained, although this proved difficult.

That year, she also joined the Iberian Federation of Libertarian Youth (FIJL) and participated in the revolutionary committee in the El Clot neighbourhood, where she helped lead the resistance to the coup attempt of July 1936 in Barcelona. On the night of 18–19 July, she was at the Construction Workers’ Union on Carrer Mercaders, together with other women from the CNT. While the men went to lay siege to the Atarazanas shipyard, where the coup plotters had entrenched themselves, the women occupied the Casa Cambó, barricaded it and turned it into the headquarters of the CNT-FAI. During the rest of the Spanish Civil War, Estorach requisitioned cinemas to turn them into soup kitchens, provided support on the front line, organised mutual aid initiatives, and travelled around the regions of Aragon, Catalunya and parts of the Valencian region as a representative of the CNT, FAI and FIJL.

In late 1936, together with Mujeres Libres, she helped to establish the House of the Woman Worker (Catalan: Casal de la Dona Treballadora) which aimed to provide technical training and social education. She also wrote for both the FAI’s Tierra y Libertad and the Mujeres Libre magazine.

=== Exile and her Trotskyist period ===
On 26 January 1939, while on her way to France to escape capture by the Francoist troops that were approaching Barcelona, she learned that two members of Mujeres Libres, one of whom was Pepita Carpena, remained in the city. According to Dupuy, she risked her life to return by car and collect and take them to safety across the French border.

After crossing into France, she was held in an internment camp and later imprisoned in Orléans, from where she escaped with the help of French anarchists.

The German occupation of France during the Second World War forced Estorach to return to Spain and go underground. There she met the Trotskyist Andrés García de la Riva, known as Colombo. In 1940 they illegally crossed the border back into France and joined a group of exiled Spanish Trotskyists in Bordeaux. Later, García de la Riva returned to Spain on a clandestine mission where he was arrested and imprisoned. Estorach attempted to return to Spain in 1945, but was again forced to flee because of political repression.

She was later sent to the Fourth International’s school for cadres, where she met Michel Lequenne, whom she married out of fear that the Spanish refugees would be deported.

Estorach became a member of the Internationalist Communist Party – French Section of the Fourth International (PCI-SFQI) and wrote in its journal La Vérité under the pseudonym María about the situation in Franco’s Spain. Although her writings on Spain were well received, her background as an anarchist led some of her comrades to view them with suspicion, according to the Dictionnaire international des militantes anarchistes (DIMA).

She worked as a translator and editor, and was employed as a secretary by the publishing house Éditions Érasme, where she met Daniel Guérin, who helped her reconcile Marxism with anarchism.

Estorach broke with Trotskyism following the crisis of the Fourth International in 1952–53 and her expulsion from the faction led by Marcel Bleibtreu. In 1957, she divorced Lequenne, although they stayed on good terms and collaborated on publishing projects.

=== Final years and writings on Mujeres Libres ===
She contributed to the magazine Mujeres Libres en el exilio (Mujeres Libres in exile), published from 1964 to 1976 under the initiative of Sara Berenguer based in Montady, France, and Suceso Portales based in London. She also contributed to the unpublished book on Mujeres Libres organised by Mercedes Comaposada following Franco’s death. The original manuscript was lost at the time of Comaposada’s death in 1994, and in 1999, the surviving members of Mujeres Libres published, in collaboration with the Anselmo Lorenzo Foundation, Mujeres Libres. Luchadoras libertarias which included a posthumous text by Estorach.

Estorach did not live to see it published. She died in Paris on 14 March 1993.

== See also ==
- Anarchism in Spain
- Mujeres Libres

== Bibliography ==
- Abejon Olivera, Maria Soledad (12 October 2010). "Soledad Estorach Esterri" [Biographical Dictionary of Women]. Diccionari Biogràfic de Dones (in Catalan). Archived from the original on 26 January 2020.
- Ackelsberg, Martha (2018). "Activism, Revolution and War: Mujeres Libres Addressing the Personal and the Political". Revista Universitaria de Historia Militar. 7 (13). Centro de Estudios de la Guerra-RUHM: 81–103. ISSN 2254-6111.
- "Soledad Estorach Esterri". Biblioteca Anarquista Maria Rius (in Catalan). 2024.
- Berenguer, Sara (November 2004). Entre el sol y la tormenta [Between the sun and the storm] (in Spanish). L'Eixam Edicions and Fundación Salvador Seguí.
- Dupuy, Daniel “Rolf”. "ESTORACH ESTERRI, Soledad". Dictionnaire international des militantes anarchistes (DIMA) (in French).
- Íñiguez Campos, Miguel (2008). Enciclopedia histórica del anarquismo español [Historical Encyclopedia of Spanish Anarchism] (in Spanish). Asociación Isaac Puente. ISBN 978-84-612-4049-4.
- Kaplan, Temma (1971). "Spanish Anarchism and Women's Liberation". Journal of Contemporary History. 6 (2): 101–110. Archived from the original on 15 April 1971 – via SAGE Journals.
- Lequenne, Michel (9 December 2008). "ESTORACH Soledad [épouse LEQUENNE]. Pseudonyme: "Maria"". Dictionnaire biographique Le Maitron (in French).
- Heath, Nick (2 January 2008). "Estorach, Soledad, 1915-1993". Libcom.org.
- Sanchez Blanco, Laura (2017). "Mujeres Libres en la Guerra Civil española. La capacitación cultural y profesional en la región de Cataluña" [Mujeres Libres in the Spanish Civil War: Cultural and Professional Training in the Region of Catalonia]. Historia Social y de la Educación (in Spanish). 6 (3).
- S.O.V. de CNT Puerto Real. "SOLEDAD ESTORACH ESTERRI - MUJERES LIBRES". CNT Puerto Real. Archived from the original on 6 March 2017.
