= Torrebesses =

- Municipality
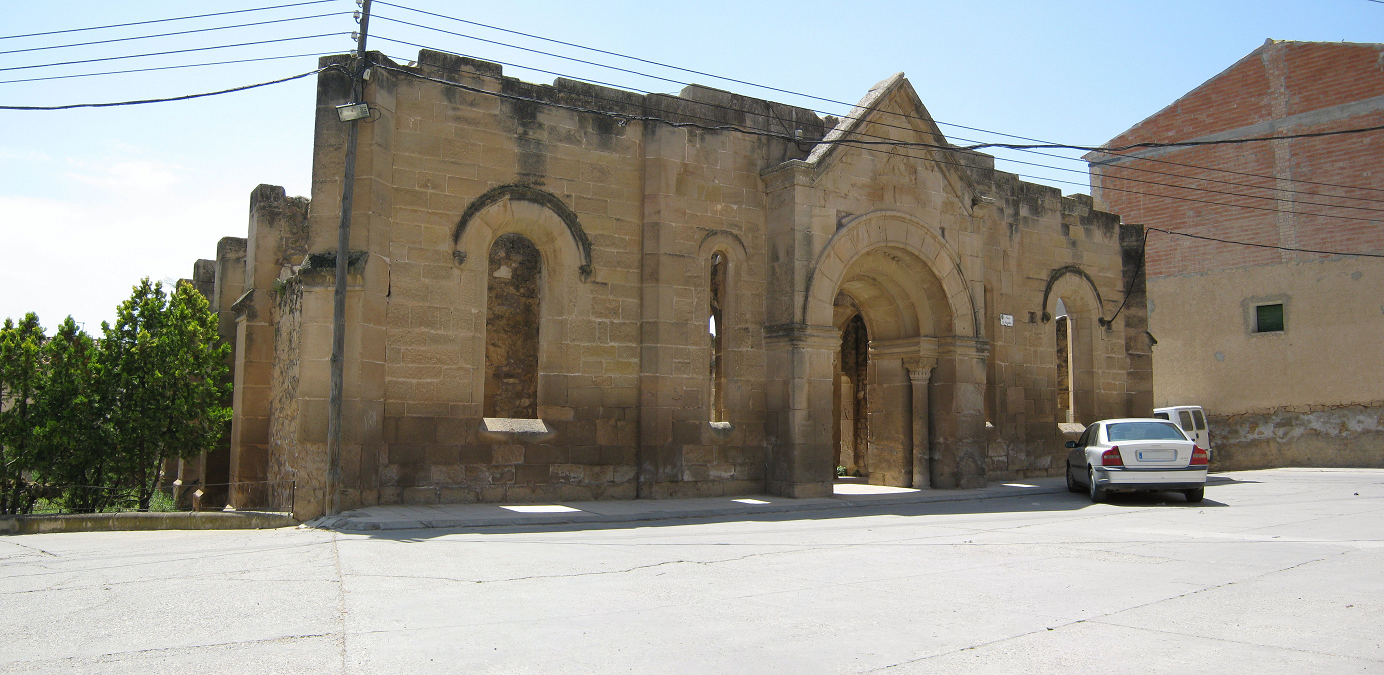
- New church of Torrebesses

- Flag Coat of arms

- Location in Catalonia
- Coordinates: 41°25′41″N 0°35′42″E
- Province: Lleida
- Comarca: Segrià

Government
  - Mayor: Mario Urrea Marsal (2015)

Area
  - Total: 27.4 km^{2} (10.6 sq mi)
- Elevation: 287 m (942 ft)

Population (2025-01-01)
  - Total: 278
  - Density: 10.1/km^{2} (26.3/sq mi)
- Demonym(s): Torrebessí, torrebessina
- Postal code: 25226
- Website: torrebesses.cat

Torrebesses (Catalan pronunciation: [ˌtoreˈβeses]) is a municipality in the comarca of Segrià in Catalonia, Spain.

The name of the town comes from Catalan: Torres Bessones, meaning "Twin Towers".

It has a population of 278 (register office, 2025). Its population has been declining since 1877 when it had 944 inhabitants.

== Demography ==
1900	1930	1950	1970	1986	2009
855	758	631	415	n/a	300

== See also ==
- Battle of Almenar
