= Sunyer, Spain =

Sunyer
- Municipality
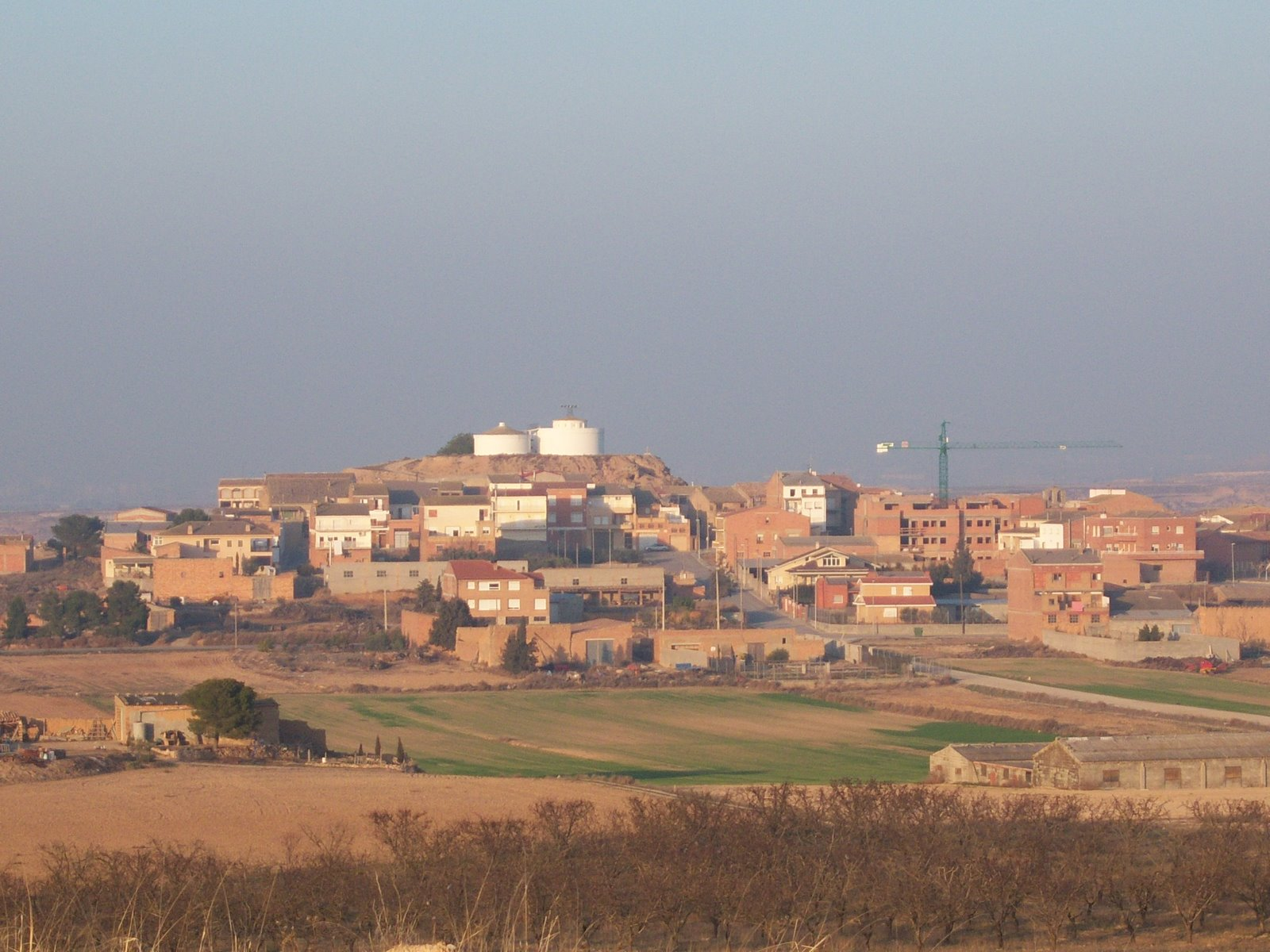
- Sunyer

- Flag Coat of arms

- Location in Catalonia
- Coordinates: 41°31′29″N 0°35′37″E
- Country: Spain
- Community: Catalonia
- Province: Lleida
- Comarca: Segrià

Government
  - Mayor: Margarita Bosch López (2015)

Area
  - Total: 12.7 km^{2} (4.9 sq mi)
- Elevation: 211 m (692 ft)

Population (2025-01-01)
  - Total: 310
  - Density: 24/km^{2} (63/sq mi)
- Website: sunyer.ddl.net

Sunyer (Catalan pronunciation: [suˈɲe]) is a village in the province of Lleida and autonomous community of Catalonia, Spain.

It has a population of 310 (register office, 2025).
