= Els Alamús =

- Municipality
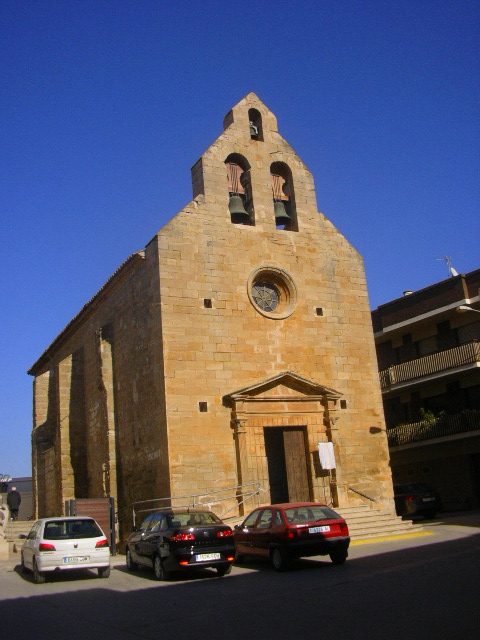
- Els Alamús parish church

- Location in Catalonia
- Coordinates: 41.614°N 0.740°E
- Country: Spain
- Community: Catalonia
- Province: Lleida
- Comarca: Segrià

Government
  - Mayor: Celestí Panavera Altisent (2015) (PSC)

Area
  - Total: 20.5 km^{2} (7.9 sq mi)
- Elevation: 212 m (696 ft)

Population (2025-01-01)
  - Total: 835
  - Density: 40.7/km^{2} (105/sq mi)
- Website: alamus.ddl.net

Els Alamús (Catalan pronunciation: [elz alaˈmus]) is a town situated in the comarca of Segrià in Lleida, Catalonia, Spain. It has a population of 835 (register office, 2025).
