= Montoliu de Lleida =

- Municipality
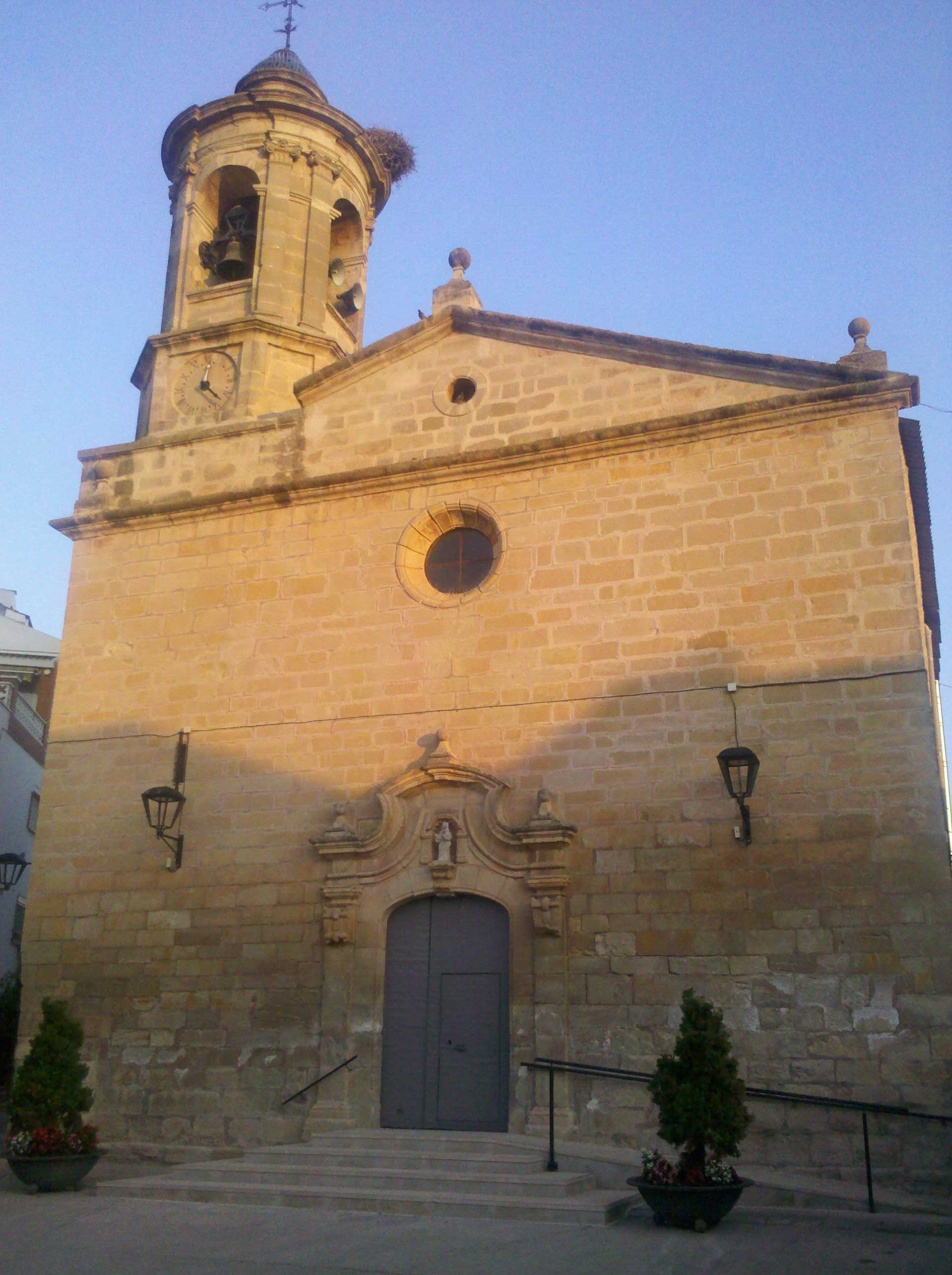
- Parish church

- Coat of arms

- Location in Catalonia
- Coordinates: 41°33′41″N 0°35′27″E
- Country: Spain
- Community: Catalonia
- Province: Lleida
- Comarca: Segrià

Government
  - Mayor: Daniel Farré Gort (2015)

Area
  - Total: 7.3 km^{2} (2.8 sq mi)
- Elevation: 166 m (545 ft)

Population (2025-01-01)
  - Total: 488
  - Density: 67/km^{2} (170/sq mi)
- Website: montoliulleida.ddl.net

Montoliu de Lleida (Catalan pronunciation: [montoˈliw ðe ˈʎejðɛ]) is a village and municipi (municipality) in the province of Lleida and autonomous community of Catalonia, Spain.

It has a population of 488 (register office, 2025).
