= Corbins =

- Municipality
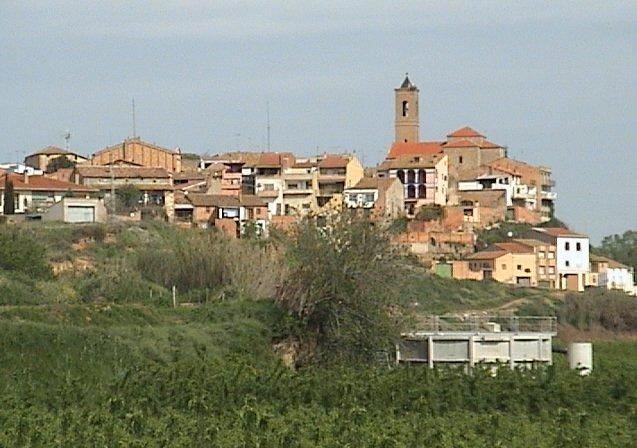

- Flag Coat of arms

- Location in Catalonia
- Coordinates: 41.691°N 0.693°E
- Country: Spain
- Community: Catalonia
- Province: Lleida
- Comarca: Segrià

Government
  - Mayor: Jaume Camarasa Lesan (2015)

Area
  - Total: 21.0 km^{2} (8.1 sq mi)
- Elevation: 211 m (692 ft)

Population (2025-01-01)
  - Total: 1,502
  - Density: 71.5/km^{2} (185/sq mi)
- Demonym(s): Corbinenc, corbinenca
- Website: corbins.cat

Corbins (Catalan pronunciation: [koɾˈβins]) is a municipality in the comarca of the Segrià in Catalonia, Spain. It is situated at the confluence of the Segre and Noguera Ribagorçana rivers and is linked to Lleida by a local road running parallel to the Segre.

== Demography ==
It has a population of 1,502 (register office, 2025).

| 1900 | 1930 | 1950 | 1970 | 1986 | 2007 |
|---|---|---|---|---|---|
| 959 | 1105 | 1009 | 1067 | 1034 | 1340 |
