= Maials =

- Municipality
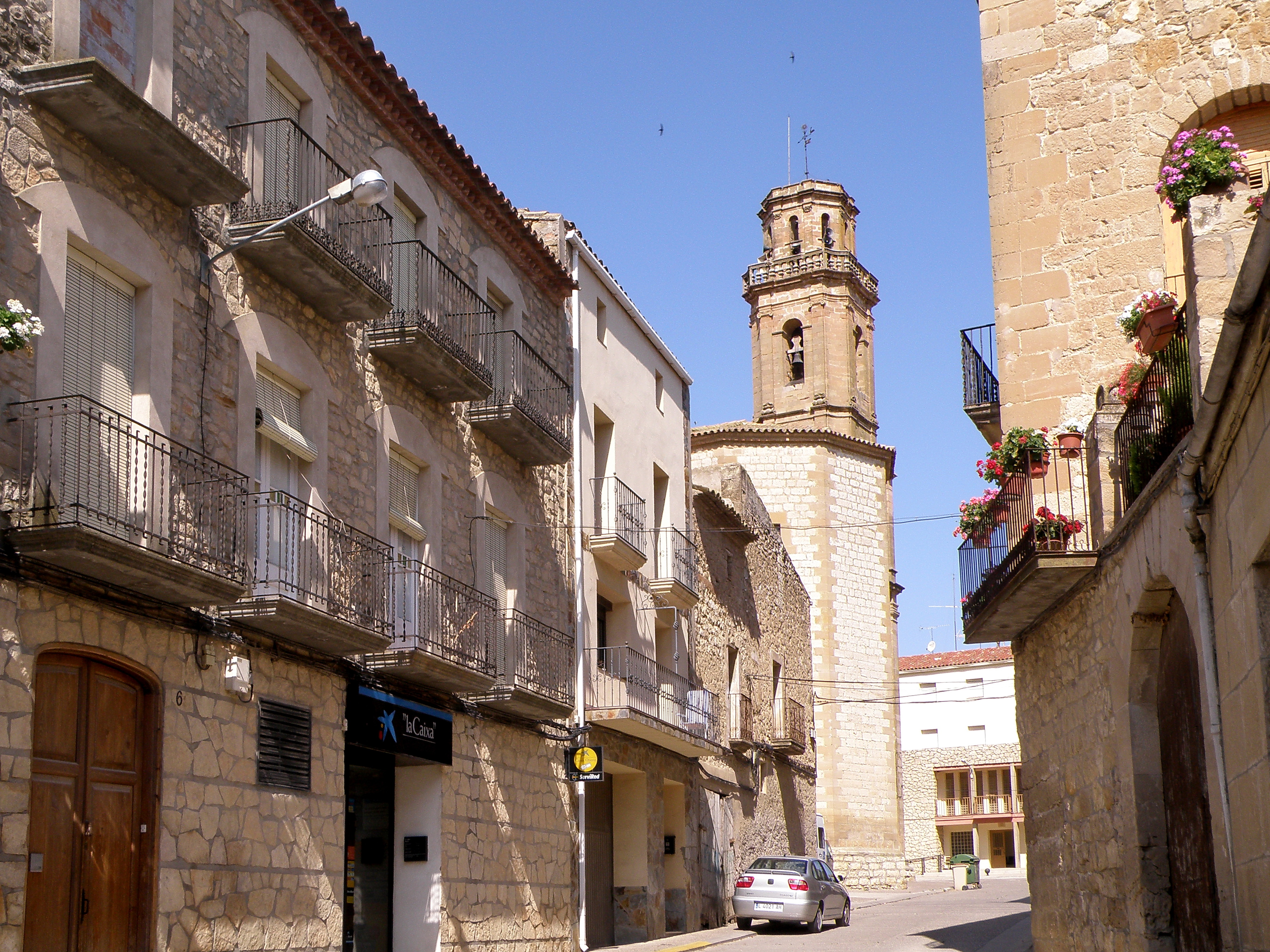
- Carrer de Maials, with the church of the Assumption

- Flag Coat of arms

- Location in Catalonia
- Coordinates: 41°21′57″N 0°30′19″E
- Country: Spain
- Community: Catalonia
- Province: Lleida
- Comarca: Segrià

Government
  - mayor: David Masot Florensa (2015)

Area
  - Total: 57.1 km^{2} (22.0 sq mi)
- Elevation: 395 m (1,296 ft)

Population (2025-01-01)
  - Total: 951
  - Density: 16.7/km^{2} (43.1/sq mi)
- Demonym(s): Maialenc, maialenca
- Postal code: 25133
- Website: maials.cat

Maials (Catalan pronunciation: [maˈjals]) is a municipality in the comarca of the Segrià in Catalonia, Spain. It used to be the centre of the Maials Barony (Baronia de Maials).

It has a population of 951 (register office, 2025).

== Demography ==
1900	1930	1950	1970	1986	2007
2271	2366	1983	1067	n/a	973
