= Alfés =

- Municipality
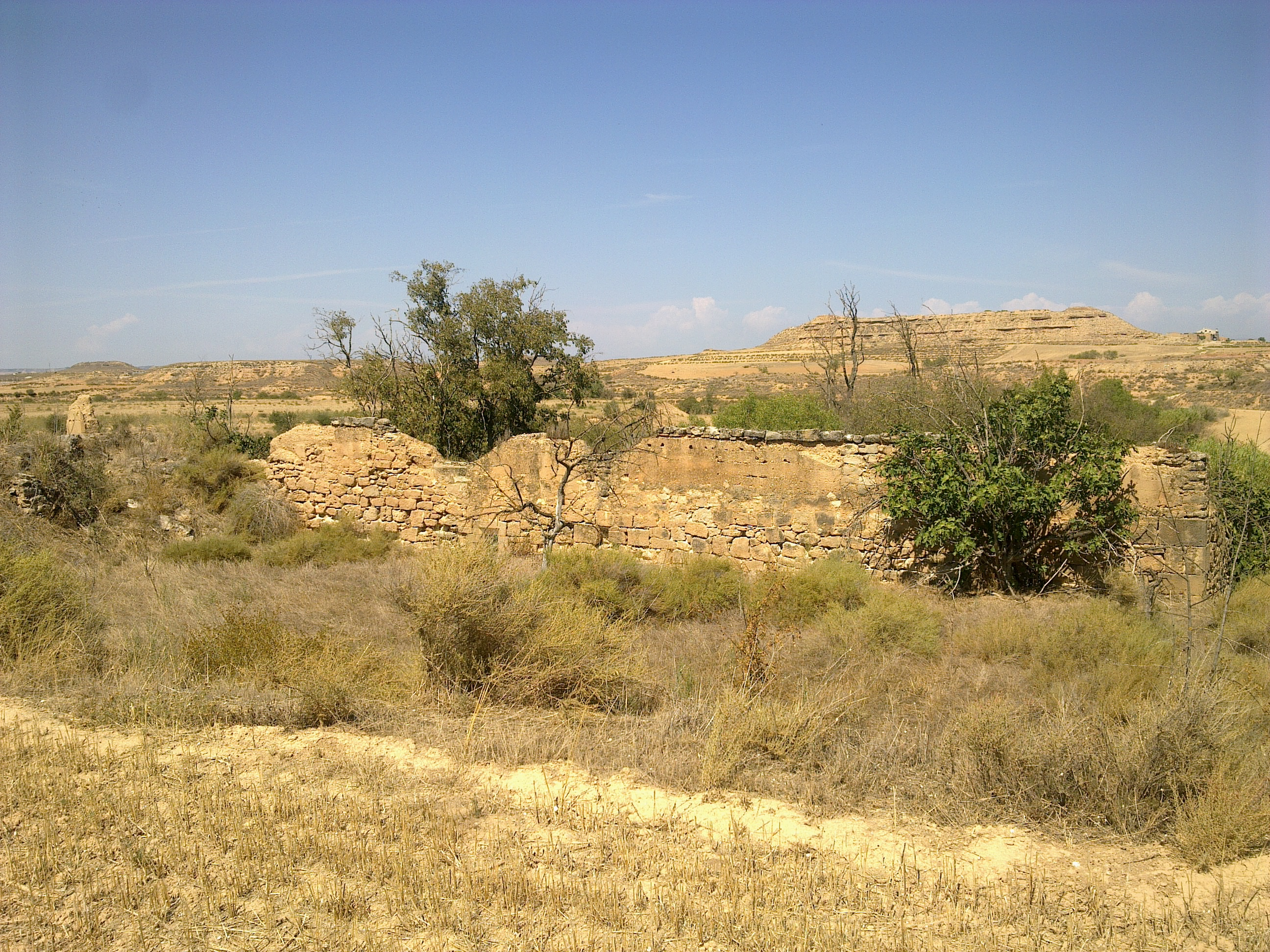
- Vinfaro castle, Alfés

- Flag Coat of arms

- Location in Catalonia
- Coordinates: 41°31′N 0°37′E
- Country: Spain
- Community: Catalonia
- Province: Lleida
- Comarca: Segrià

Government
  - Mayor: Hilari Guiu Sentís (2015)

Area
  - Total: 31.9 km^{2} (12.3 sq mi)

Population (2025-01-01)
  - Total: 284
  - Density: 8.90/km^{2} (23.1/sq mi)
- Website: alfes.cat

Alfés (Catalan pronunciation: [alˈfes]) is a village in the province of Lleida and autonomous community of Catalonia, Spain.

It has a population of 284 (register office, 2025).

== Local politics ==
In 2007-2011 a Belgian resident, Ann Gyles, from the Republican Left of Catalonia, became mayor of Alfés. She had already been adjunct mayor in 2003–2007.
