= Vilanova de Segrià =

- Municipality
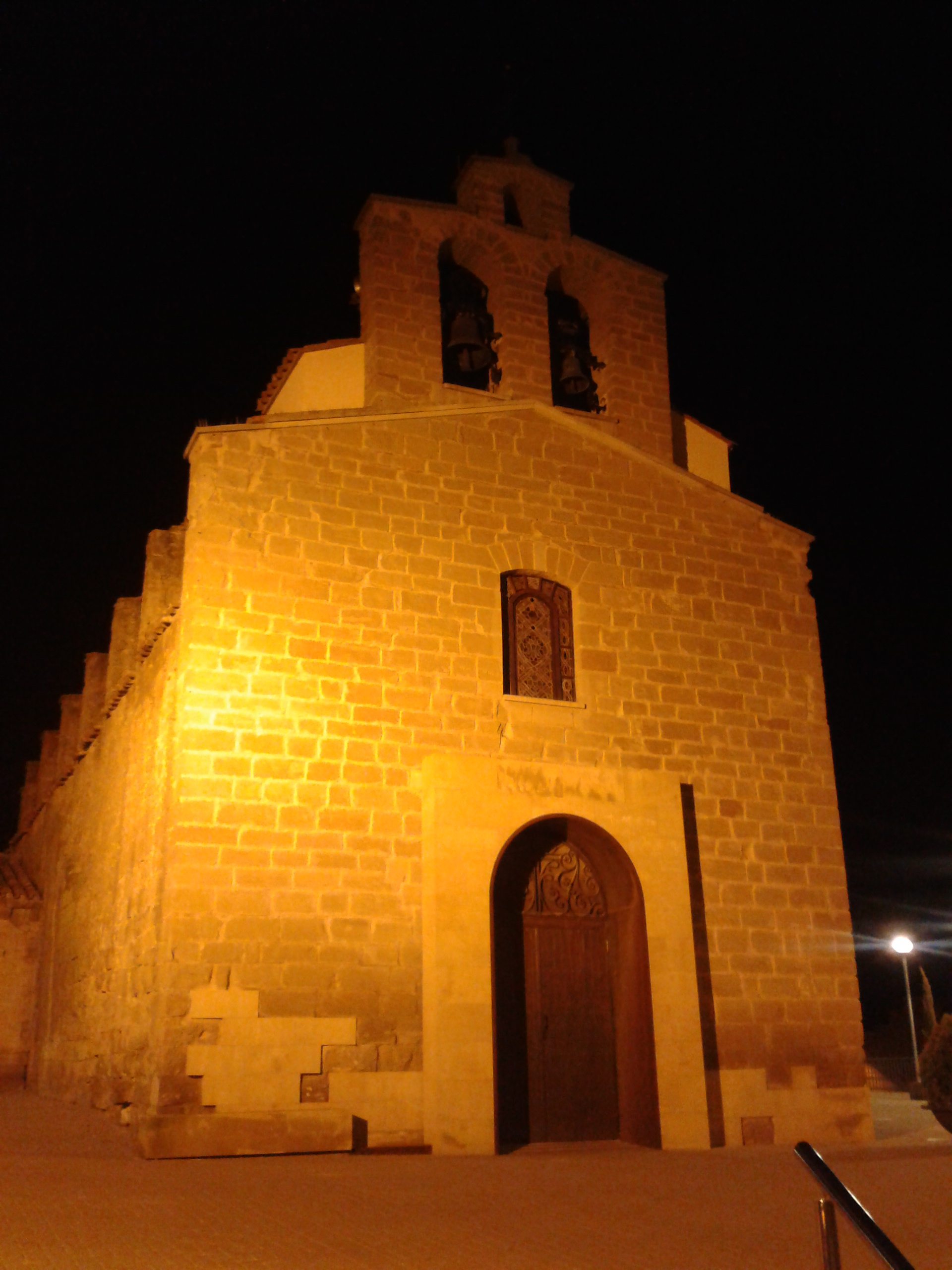
- St. Sebastian's church

- Coat of arms

- Location in Catalonia
- Coordinates: 41°42′50″N 0°37′11″E
- Country: Spain
- Community: Catalonia
- Province: Lleida
- Comarca: Segrià

Government
  - Mayor: Josep Vila Cabalé (2015)

Area
  - Total: 8.5 km^{2} (3.3 sq mi)
- Elevation: 255 m (837 ft)

Population (2025-01-01)
  - Total: 1,094
  - Density: 130/km^{2} (330/sq mi)
- Website: www.vilanovasegria.cat

Vilanova de Segrià (Catalan pronunciation: [ˌbilaˈnɔβɛ ðe seɣɾiˈa]) is a village in the province of Lleida and autonomous community of Catalonia, Spain.

It has a population of 1,094 (register office, 2025).
