= Vilanova de la Barca =

- Municipality
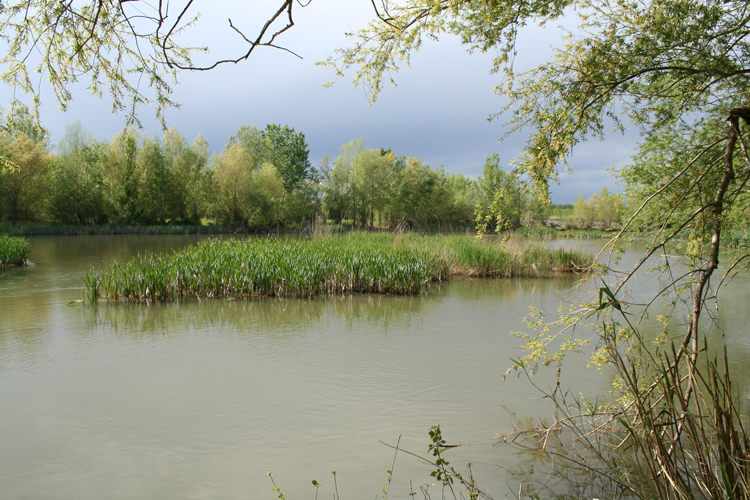
- The Corb and Segre rivers joining at Vilanova

- Flag Coat of arms

- Location in the Province of Lleida Location in Catalonia Location in Spain
- Coordinates: 41°41′28″N 0°43′43″E
- Country: Spain
- Community: Catalonia
- Province: Lleida
- Comarca: Segrià

Government
  - Mayor: Josep Ramon Solsona i Oliva (2016)

Area
  - Total: 21.6 km^{2} (8.3 sq mi)
- Elevation: 195 m (640 ft)

Population (2025-01-01)
  - Total: 1,163
  - Density: 53.8/km^{2} (139/sq mi)
- Demonym(s): Vilanoví, vilanovina
- Website: vilanovabarca.ddl.net

Vilanova de la Barca (Catalan pronunciation: [ˌbilaˈnɔβɛ ðe la ˈβaɾkɛ]) is a municipality in the comarca of Segrià in Catalonia, Spain. It is situated at the confluence of the Segre and Corb rivers. The Urgell canal provides irrigation water for growing cereals and forage plants. The municipality is linked to Lleida and Balaguer by the C-1313 road and a FGC railroad.

== Demography ==
It has a population of 1,163 (register office, 2025).

1900	1930	1950	1970	1986	2007
779	878	1030	976	871	1105
