= Torre-serona =

- Municipality
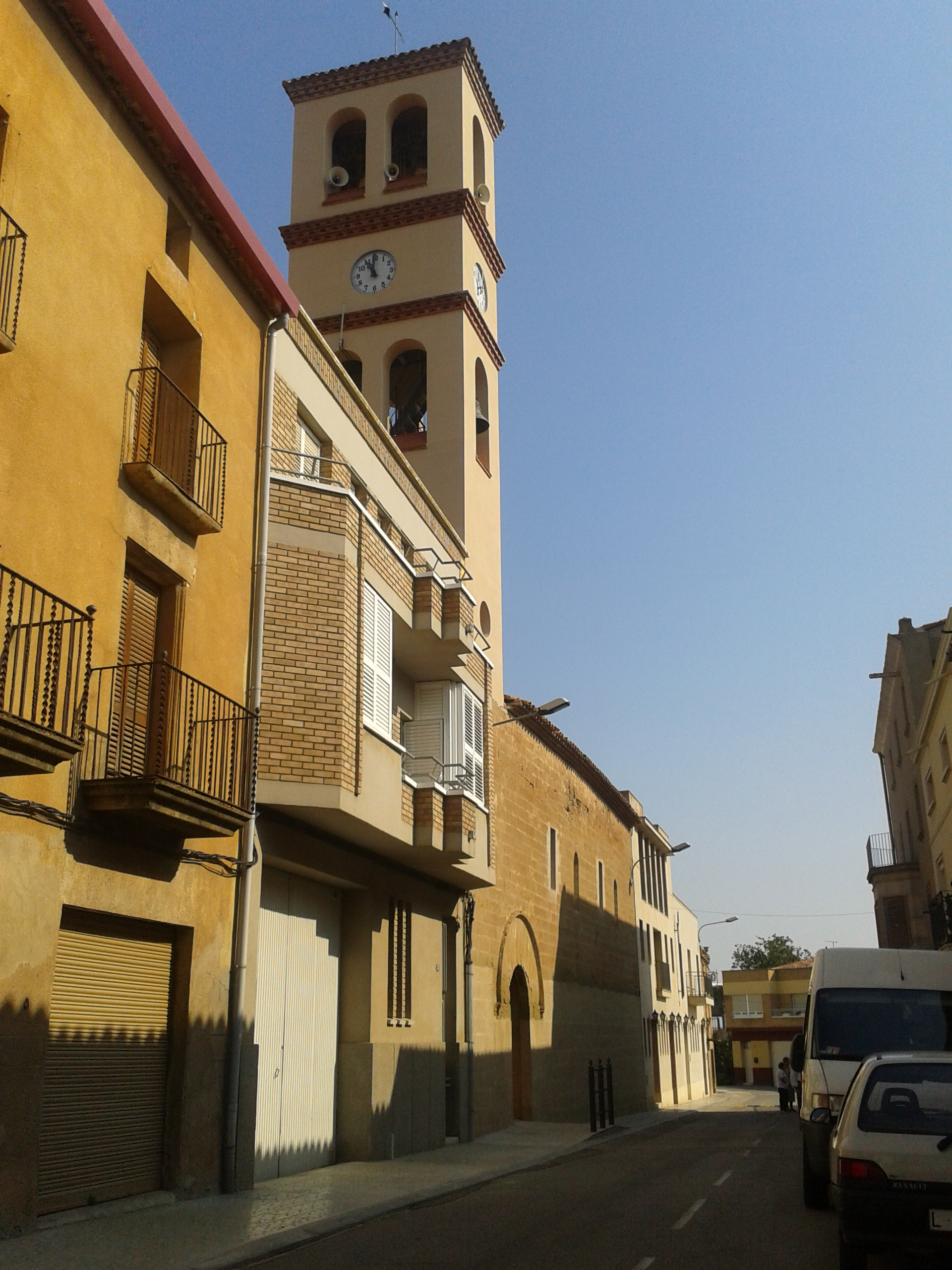
- Church of the Assumption

- Location in Catalonia
- Coordinates: 41°40′27″N 0°37′55″E
- Country: Spain
- Community: Catalonia
- Province: Lleida
- Comarca: Segrià

Government
  - Mayor: Enric Colom Sandiumenge (2015)

Area
  - Total: 5.9 km^{2} (2.3 sq mi)
- Elevation: 197 m (646 ft)

Population (2025-01-01)
  - Total: 405
  - Density: 69/km^{2} (180/sq mi)
- Website: torreserona.ddl.net

Torre-serona (Catalan pronunciation: [ˌtoreseˈɾonɛ]) is a village in the province of Lleida and autonomous community of Catalonia, Spain.

It has a population of 405 (register office, 2025).

== Toponymy ==
From Catalan torre "(the) tower" and the Pyrenean Celt Serona, goddess Sirona.
