= Massalcoreig =

- Municipality
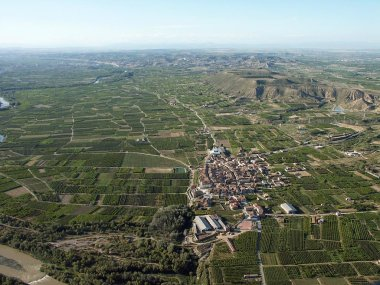
- Massalcoreig

- Coat of arms

- Location in Catalonia
- Coordinates: 41°27′40″N 0°21′37″E
- Country: Spain
- Community: Catalonia
- Province: Lleida
- Comarca: Segrià

Government
  - Mayor: Francisco Juste Guardiola (2015)

Area
  - Total: 14.1 km^{2} (5.4 sq mi)
- Elevation: 94 m (308 ft)

Population (2025-01-01)
  - Total: 592
  - Density: 42.0/km^{2} (109/sq mi)
- Website: massalcoreig.cat

Massalcoreig (Catalan pronunciation: [masalkoˈɾetʃ]) is a village in the province of Lleida and autonomous community of Catalonia, Spain.

It has a population of 592 (register office, 2025).
