= Albatàrrec =

- Municipality
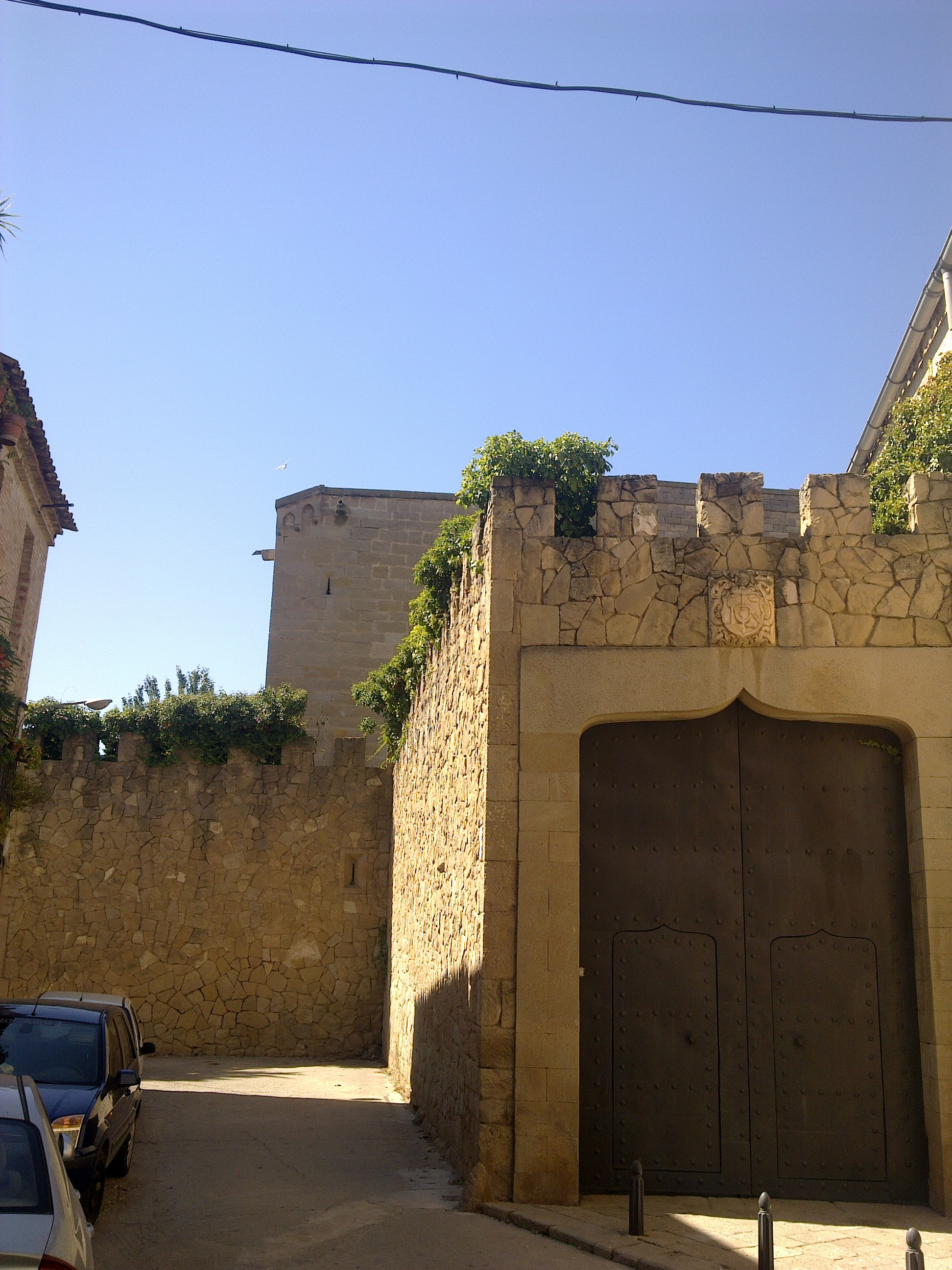
- Castell-palau dels Espolters, Albatàrrec

- Coat of arms

- Location in Catalonia
- Coordinates: 41°34′30″N 0°36′23″E
- Country: Spain
- Community: Catalonia
- Province: Lleida
- Comarca: Segrià

Government
  - Mayor: Victor Falguera Pascual (2015) (CiU)

Area
  - Total: 10.5 km^{2} (4.1 sq mi)
- Elevation: 147 m (482 ft)

Population (2025-01-01)
  - Total: 2,331
  - Density: 222/km^{2} (575/sq mi)
- Demonyms: Batarrenc, batarrenca
- Website: albatarrec.cat

Albatàrrec (Catalan pronunciation: [alβaˈtarek]) is a municipality in the comarca of the Segrià in Catalonia. It has a population of 2,331 (register office, 2025).

== Demography ==
1900	1930	1950	1970	1986	2008
564	840	807	1050	n/a	1749
