= Sudanell =

- Municipality
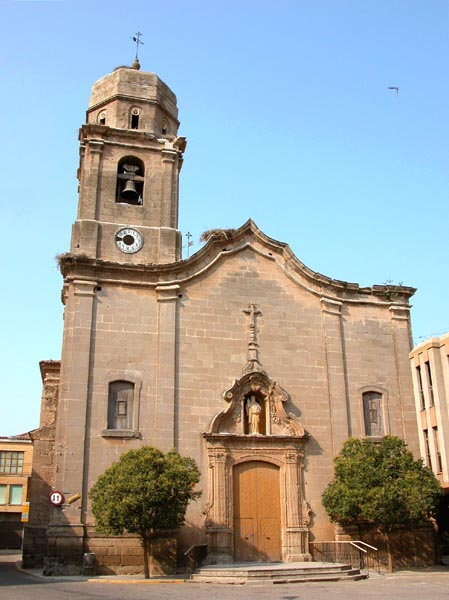
- St. Peter's church

- Location in Catalonia
- Coordinates: 41°33′N 0°34′E
- Country: Spain
- Community: Catalonia
- Province: Lleida
- Comarca: Segrià

Government
  - Mayor: Josep Maria Sanjuan Cornadó (2015) (CIU)

Area
  - Total: 8.7 km^{2} (3.4 sq mi)
- Elevation: 152 m (499 ft)

Population (2025-01-01)
  - Total: 915
  - Density: 110/km^{2} (270/sq mi)
- Demonym(s): Sudanellenc, sudanellenca
- Website: sudanell.cat

Sudanell (Catalan pronunciation: [suðaˈneʎ]) is a municipality in the comarca of the Segrià in Catalonia. It is located by the junction of two rivers: the Segre and the Set. Agriculture is Sudanell's principal economic activity (peaches, apples, pears, corn). Two canals: Canal de Seròs and Acèquia de Torres irrigate the area.

It has a population of 915 (register office, 2025).

== Elements of touristic interest ==
- Cross Head (Creu del Terme). Made from stone and dated from the 14th century.
- Parish church of Sant Pere (Saint Peter). The primitive parish church of Sant Pere, Romanesque, was replaced in the 18th century for an extense Baroque building, with a monumental façade.
- The Muladar. The graves of Muladar constitute the first necropolis excavated in the region of the Segrià.
- The Official town's Holy Day is on the first weekend in October.
