= Llardecans =

- Municipality
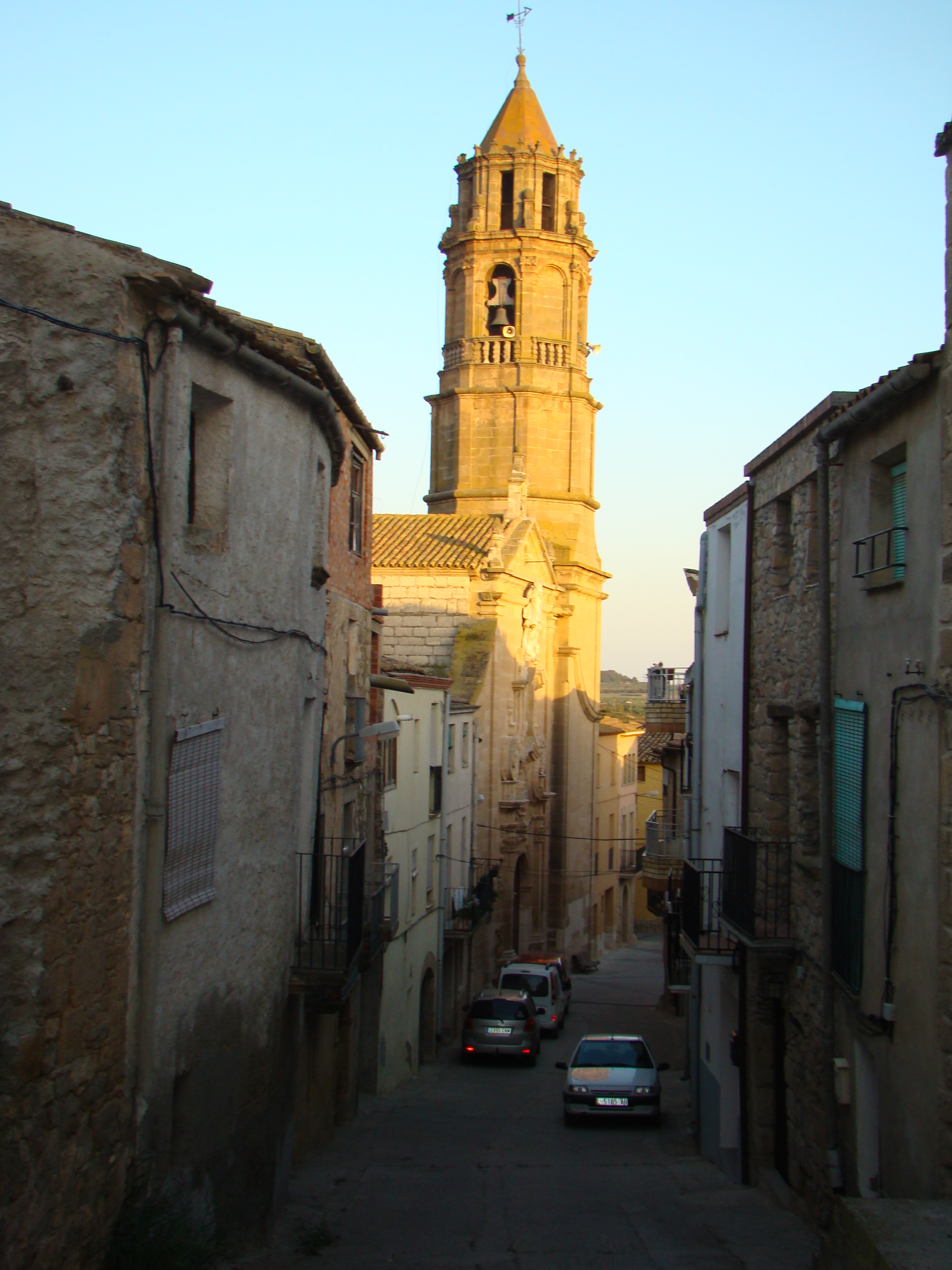
- Carrer del Clos Murallat

- Flag Coat of arms

- Location in Catalonia
- Coordinates: 41°22′N 0°33′E
- Country: Spain
- Community: Catalonia
- Province: Lleida
- Comarca: Segrià

Government
  - Mayor: Carme Pinyol Oró (2015)

Area
  - Total: 66.0 km^{2} (25.5 sq mi)
- Elevation: 397 m (1,302 ft)

Population (2025-01-01)
  - Total: 444
  - Density: 6.73/km^{2} (17.4/sq mi)
- Website: llardecans.ddl.net

Llardecans (Catalan pronunciation: [ʎaɾðeˈkans]) is a village in the province of Lleida and autonomous community of Catalonia, Spain.

It has a population of 444 (register office, 2025).
