= Alfarràs =

- Municipality
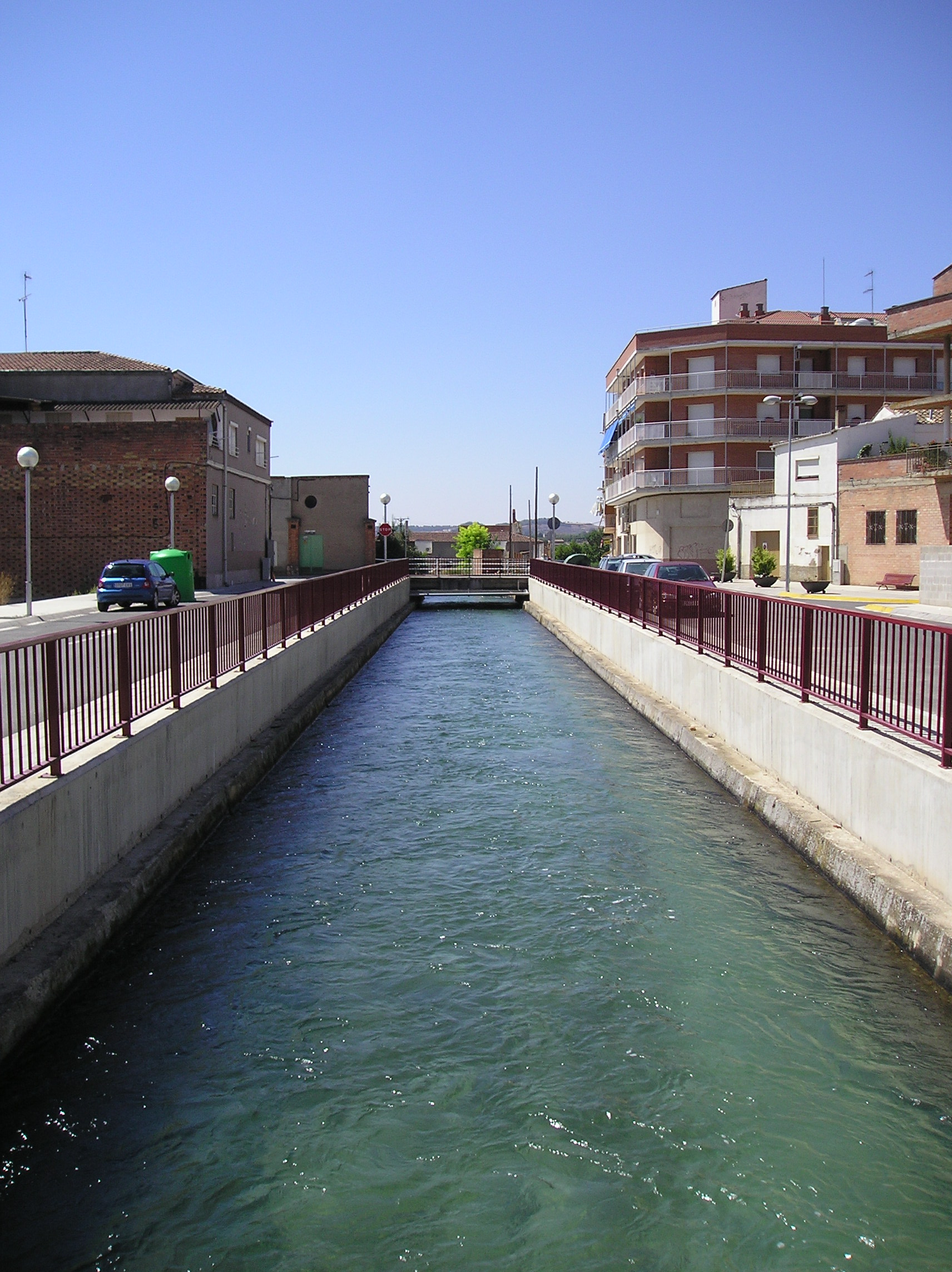
- Pinyana Canal passing Alfarràs

- Flag Coat of arms

- Location in Catalonia
- Coordinates: 41°49′58″N 0°34′20″E
- Country: Spain
- Community: Catalonia
- Province: Lleida
- Comarca: Segrià

Government
  - Mayor: Joan C. Garcia Guillamon (2019) (Alfarràs: Unitat i Progrés)

Area
  - Total: 11.4 km^{2} (4.4 sq mi)
- Elevation: 281 m (922 ft)

Population (2025-01-01)
  - Total: 2,805
  - Density: 246/km^{2} (637/sq mi)
- Demonyms: Alfarrasí, alfarrasina
- Postal code: 25120
- Website: ajuntamentalfarras.cat

Alfarràs (Catalan pronunciation: [alfaˈras]) is a municipality in the comarca of the Segrià in Catalonia, Spain. It is situated on the right bank of the Noguera Ribagorçana river, and receives irrigation water from the Aragon and Catalonia canal. The town is served by the N-230 road between Balaguer and Binéfar (comarca of La Llitera, Aragon).

== Demography ==
It has a population of 2,805 (register office, 2025).

| 1900 | 1930 | 1950 | 1970 | 1986 | 2007 |
|---|---|---|---|---|---|
| 741 | 1541 | 1709 | 3126 | 3141 | 3228 |

== Note ==
1. Alfarràs became part of the Segrià in the comarcal revision of 1990: previously it formed part of the Noguera.
