= Sarroca de Lleida =

- Municipality
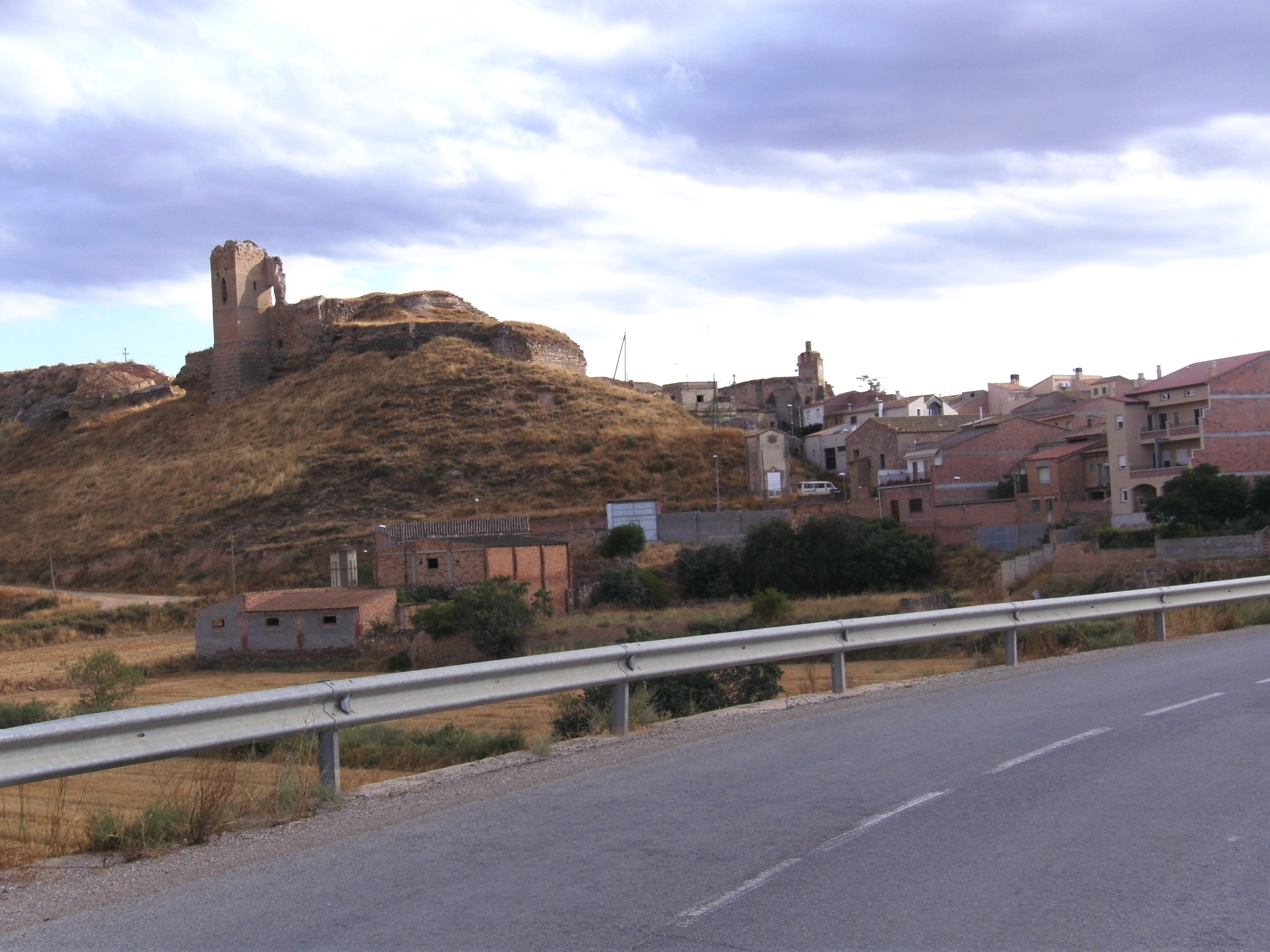

- Coat of arms

- Location in Catalonia
- Coordinates: 41°27′39″N 0°33′46″E
- Country: Spain
- Community: Catalonia
- Province: Lleida
- Comarca: Segrià

Government
  - Mayor: Jaume Reves Esteve (2015)

Area
  - Total: 42.2 km^{2} (16.3 sq mi)
- Elevation: 201 m (659 ft)

Population (2025-01-01)
  - Total: 383
  - Density: 9.08/km^{2} (23.5/sq mi)
- Website: sarrocalleida.ddl.net

Sarroca de Lleida (Catalan pronunciation: [saˈrɔkɛ ðe ˈʎejðɛ]) is a village in the province of Lleida and autonomous community of Catalonia, Spain.

It has a population of 383 (register office, 2025).
