= Pepita Carpena =

Catalan feminist and trade unionist

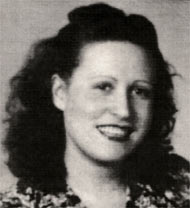
- Born: Josefa Carpena Amat; 19 December 1919; Barcelona, Catalonia, Spain
- Died: 5 June 2005 (aged 85); Marseille, Occitania, France
- Occupations: Seamstress, archivist
- Organizations: Libertarian Youth (1933–1937); Mujeres Libres (1937–1939)
- Movement: Anarchism in Spain

Josefa Carpena Amat (19 December 1919 – 5 June 2005), known by the pseudonym Pepita Carpena, was a Catalan trade unionist and anarchist feminist activist.

== Biography ==
=== Early life and activism ===
Pepita Carpena was born into a working class family in Barcelona in December 1919. At the age of 11, following the proclamation of the Second Spanish Republic, she left school and went into the workforce. She was first introduced to anarchism in 1933, when she attended a number of Libertarian Youth (FIJL) events, held to attract young members into the Spanish anarchist movement. Through these events, she attended book discussion clubs, which she said gave her a dialogic education. She became a young member of the metalworkers' union of the Confederación Nacional del Trabajo (CNT), which initially worried her parents, but after taking her father to a meeting he approved of her joining the workers' organisation. When she went into work as a seamstress, her union encouraged her to organise other women in her workplace. Her boss dismissed her from the firm for her trade union activism, but the metalworkers' union intervened and her job was reinstated. Over the subsequent years, she continued organising with the CNT and the FIJL.

=== Feminist organising in the Spanish Revolution ===
When she was only 15 years old, she witnessed the Spanish Revolution, which she described as having a transformative effect on her. When her partner was killed fighting in the Spanish Civil War, she was paid his salary as a stipend to continuing organising working women. She initially refused to join the ranks of the anarchist women's organisation Mujeres Libres, as she believed there was no need for separation between men and women in the anarchist movement. At this time, she became disillusioned with the chauvinism expressed by some of her male comrades in the FIJL. On one occasion, a male FIJL member confronted her on her views on women's liberation, insisting that she was not a liberated woman as she refused his unwanted sexual advances. She told him that, as a liberated woman, she could decide who she slept with and that he did not interest her. She reported that scenarios like this occurred regularly with their male counterparts, and that it was even worse with men that were not part of the anarchist movement. Through these experiences, she came to believe that a specific women's organisation was necessary, and in 1937, she joined the Mujeres Libres. Later that year, the FIJL established its own women's bureau. Carpena opposed the "counterproductive" decision, believing that it threatened to negate the work which the Mujeres Libres had already done, and left the organisation to continue her work in the Mujeres Libres. Many other young activists within the Mujeres Libres shared her concerns, worrying that the FIJL would drain the anarchist movement's resources by duplicating the Mujeres Libres.

Together with other new members of the organisation, such as Conchita Guillén and Amada de Nó, Carpena studied anarchist feminist ideas on gender equality and women's empowerment under the tutelage of Mercè Comaposada, who sought to teach them new ideas on what it meant to be a woman. After completing her education with Comaposada, Carpena participated in a number of "propaganda tours" organised by the Catalan branch of the Mujeres Libres. She later became the Propaganda Secretary of the Catalan Regional Committee of the Mujeres Libres. In towns throughout Catalonia, Carpena would call local women to a meeting and explain feminist principles to them; some of these women had never before heard the ideas of gender equality and women's empowerment. Carpena herself said that their attempts to educate other women on feminist principles were based in dialogue and understanding, rather than coming at it from a position of intellectual superiority. She discovered that many of these women already desired to be free from machismo, which was dominating them through force rather than through their own submission.

Carpena also appealed to sex workers to quit their jobs and join the feminist movement, convincing one to attend her classes and eventually join her cadre of the Mujeres Libres. They also taught women about women's sexuality, although Carpena noted that the Mujeres Libres did not focus attention on sexual orientation, as they believed this was not a political issue. Together with Sara Berenguer and Conchita Guillén, Carpena also visited soldiers on the front lines of the civil war, on trips organised by Solidaridad Internacional Antifascista. And together with Soledad Estorach, Carpena organised agricultural collectives throughout Catalonia and Aragon.

=== Exile ===
In January 1939, as the Nationalist Catalonia Offensive closed in on Barcelona, Carpena and other Mujeres Libres activists began organising their evacuation. They destroyed all of the organisation's documents, to prevent them from falling into enemy hands, and scheduled a truck to pick them up at 05:00 on 25 January. But their truck did not arrive, as the driver had panicked and driven north by himself, so Carpena went to the Mujeres Libres offices and found another truck to pick them up. The Mujeres Libres activists left the city only hours before the Nationalists entered. Carpena then went into exile in France. There, she became an archivist for the International Center for Research on Anarchism (CIRA) in Marseille. She travelled throughout Europe, speaking about the Spanish Revolution and her time in the Mujeres Libres. Historian Martha Ackelsberg interviewed her about the Mujeres Libres in Montpellier in December 1981 and in Barcelona in May 1988, during which she became a key primary source for Ackelsberg's book Free Women of Spain. Carpena died in Marseille on 5 June 2005.

== Bibliography ==
- Ackelsberg, Martha A. (2005) [1991]. Free Women of Spain: Anarchism and the Struggle for the Emancipation of Women. Oakland, California: AK Press. ISBN 1-902593-96-0. LCCN 2003113040. OCLC 63382446.
- Duque, Elena (2015). "Collective Biography of Female Anarchists Participating in the Free Women and Libertarian Movements". Qualitative Inquiry. 21 (10): 934–940. doi:10.1177/1077800415611692.
- Gemie, Sharif (2006). "The Ballad of Bourg-Madame: Memory, Exile, and the Spanish Republican Refugees of the Retirada of 1939". International Review of Social History. 51 (1): 1–40. doi:10.1017/s0020859005002300.
- Ruiz, Laura (2010). Free Women (Mujeres Libres): Voices and Memories for a Libertarian Future. Sense Publishers. ISBN 978-94-6091-087-6.
