= Alguaire =

- Municipality
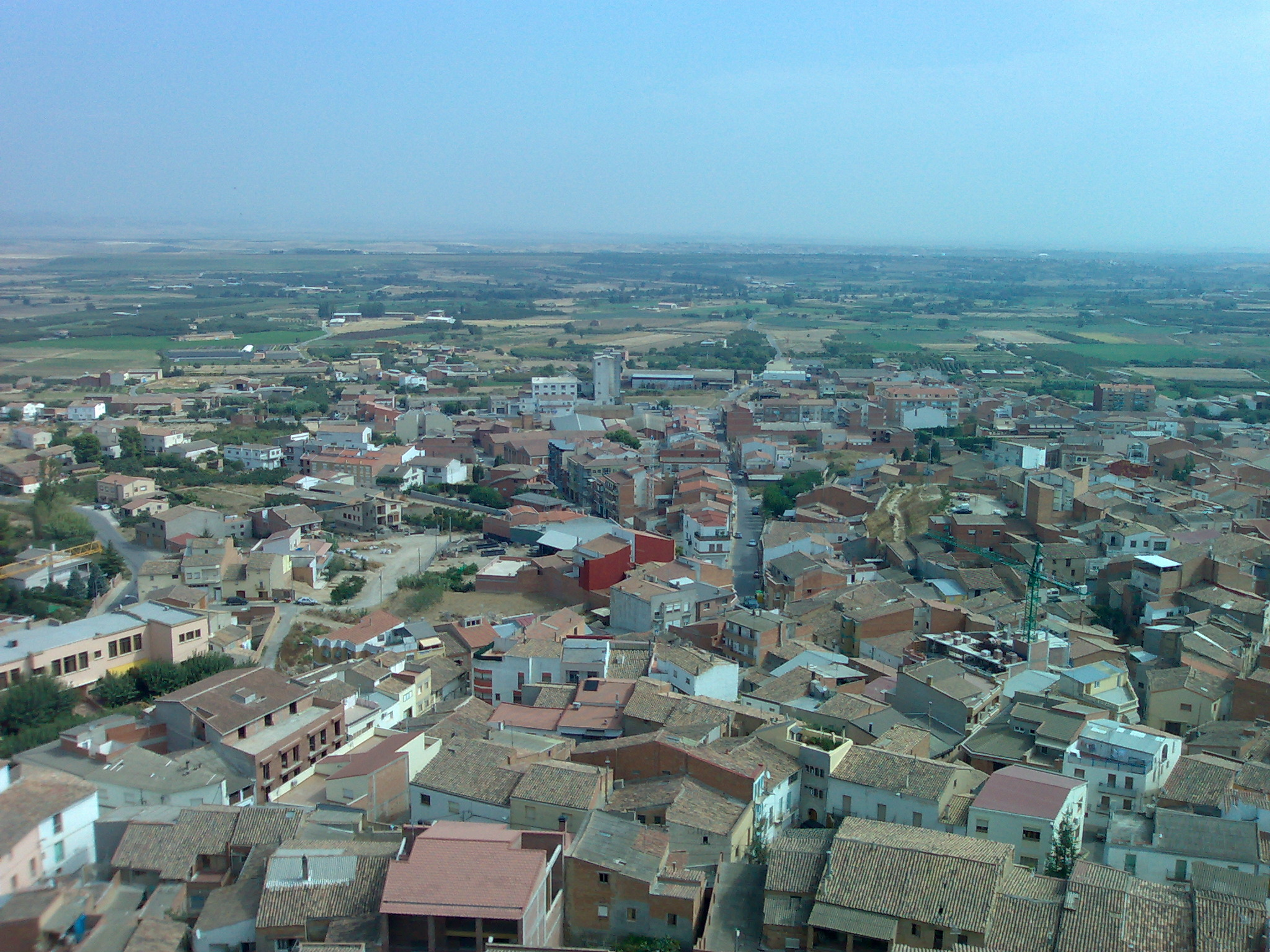

- Coat of arms

- Location in Catalonia
- Coordinates: 41°44′19″N 0°35′8″E
- Country: Spain
- Community: Catalonia
- Province: Lleida
- Comarca: Segrià

Government
  - Mayor: Antoni Perea Hervera (2015) (PSC)

Area
  - Total: 50.1 km^{2} (19.3 sq mi)
- Elevation: 304 m (997 ft)

Population (2025-01-01)
  - Total: 3,060
  - Density: 61.1/km^{2} (158/sq mi)
- Demonyms: Alguairenc, Alguairenca
- Website: www.alguaire.cat

Alguaire (Catalan pronunciation: [alˈɣwajɾe]) is a municipality in the comarca of the Segrià in Catalonia. A portion of its municipal limits are occupied by the Lleida–Alguaire Airport.

== Demography ==
It has a population of 3,060 (register office, 2025).

1900	1930	1950	1970	1986	2008
2346	2390	2565	2782	n/a	3129
