= Alcanó =

- municipality
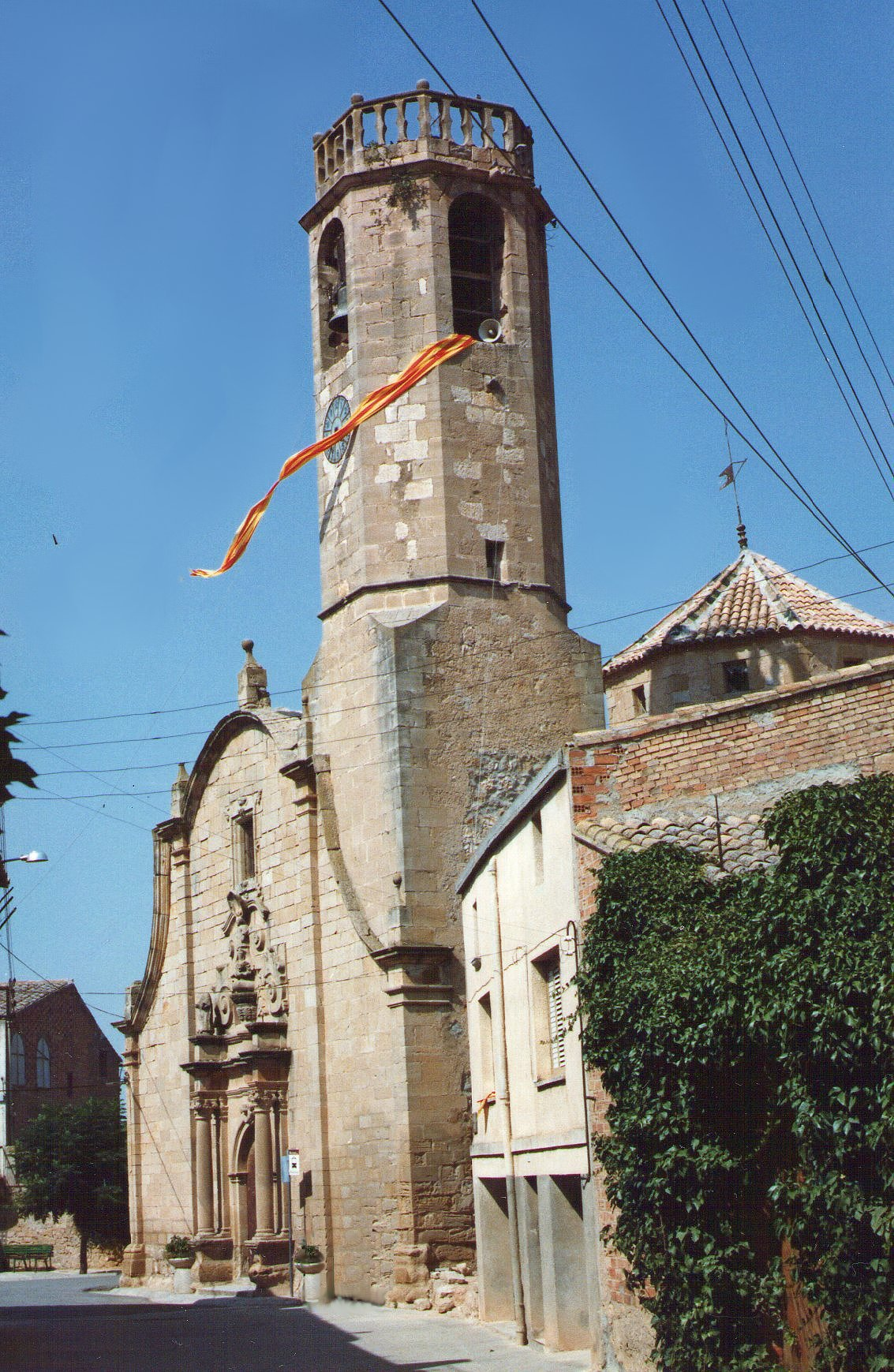
- St. Peter's church, Alcanó

- Flag Coat of arms

- Location in Catalonia
- Coordinates: 41°29′N 0°37′E
- Country: ESP
- Comarca: Segriá

Government
  - Mayor: Sebastià Manuel Ricart Florensa (2015)

Area
  - Total: 21.0 km^{2} (8.1 sq mi)
- Elevation: 214 m (702 ft)

Population (2025-01-01)
  - Total: 244
  - Density: 11.6/km^{2} (30.1/sq mi)
- Postal code: 25162
- Website: alcano.ddl.net

Alcanó (Catalan pronunciation: [alkaˈno]) is a village in the province of Lleida and autonomous community of Catalonia, Spain.

It has a population of 244 (register office, 2025).

== History ==
The municipality was first mentioned in a 1203 document which detailed the acquisition of a palace by Gombau of Camporrells, bishop of Lerida in exchange for the rights to the Alcanó Almunia. The Alcanó Almunia is of a Saracen origin.

In documents from 1267 it appeared under the name Alcanó de la Frontera. The lordship of the castle belonged to Hug de Tolosa and later to Pere de Sanahuja. In 1450 he became the Clergy of Lleida.

== Symbols ==
The coat of arms of Alcanó is defined by the following blazon: "Losanjado Shield: Vert, a canyon of gold. For stamps a mural crown of the people."

It was approved on August 17, 1993. The canyon is a popular traditional signal symbolizing the name of the people.

== Culture ==
Close to the Plaza Mayor there is a building which corresponds to the ancient castle of the town. The building was renovated but original features such as an arched shaped window or some of the interior walls are still visible.

The parish church is dedicated to Saint Peter. It is eighteenth century baroque. It has an oversized dome and its belfry has an octagonal base. In 1936 two Baroque altarpieces that were kept inside were destroyed, both from the eighteenth century.

Alcanó celebrates its main festival in the month of August.

== Economy ==
The main economic activity is agriculture, especially rainfed. Crops include cereal crops, almonds and olives.
