= Soses =

- Municipality
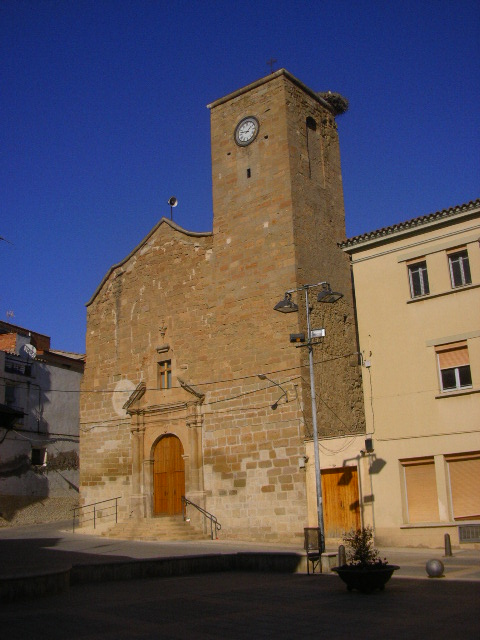
- Soses parish church

- Coat of arms

- Location in Catalonia
- Coordinates: 41°32′N 0°29′E
- Country: Spain
- Community: Catalonia
- Province: Lleida
- Comarca: Segrià

Government
  - Mayor: Isidre Mesalles Mayora (2015)

Area
  - Total: 30.2 km^{2} (11.7 sq mi)
- Elevation: 118 m (387 ft)

Population (2025-01-01)
  - Total: 1,892
  - Density: 62.6/km^{2} (162/sq mi)
- Website: soses.cat

Soses (Catalan pronunciation: [ˈsɔzes]) is a village in the province of Lleida and autonomous community of Catalonia, Spain.

It has a population of 1,892 (register office, 2025).
