= Puigverd de Lleida =

- Municipality
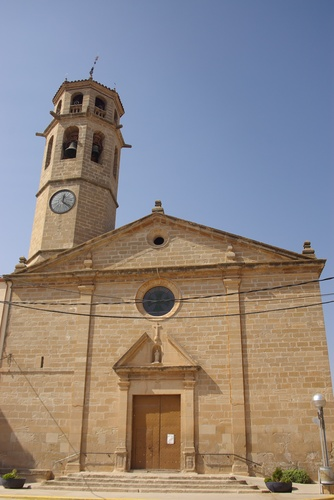
- St. Peter's church, Puigverd

- Coat of arms

- Location in Catalonia
- Coordinates: 41°32′35″N 0°44′3″E
- Country: Spain
- Community: Catalonia
- Province: Lleida
- Comarca: Segrià

Government
  - Mayor: Benjamí Bosch Torres (2015)

Area
  - Total: 12.5 km^{2} (4.8 sq mi)
- Elevation: 219 m (719 ft)

Population (2025-01-01)
  - Total: 1,409
  - Density: 113/km^{2} (292/sq mi)
- Website: puigverdlleida.cat

Puigverd de Lleida (Catalan pronunciation: [pudʒˈβɛɾd de ˈʎejðɛ]) is a village in the province of Lleida and autonomous community of Catalonia, Spain.

It has a population of 1,409 (register office, 2025).
