= Alcoletge =

- Municipality
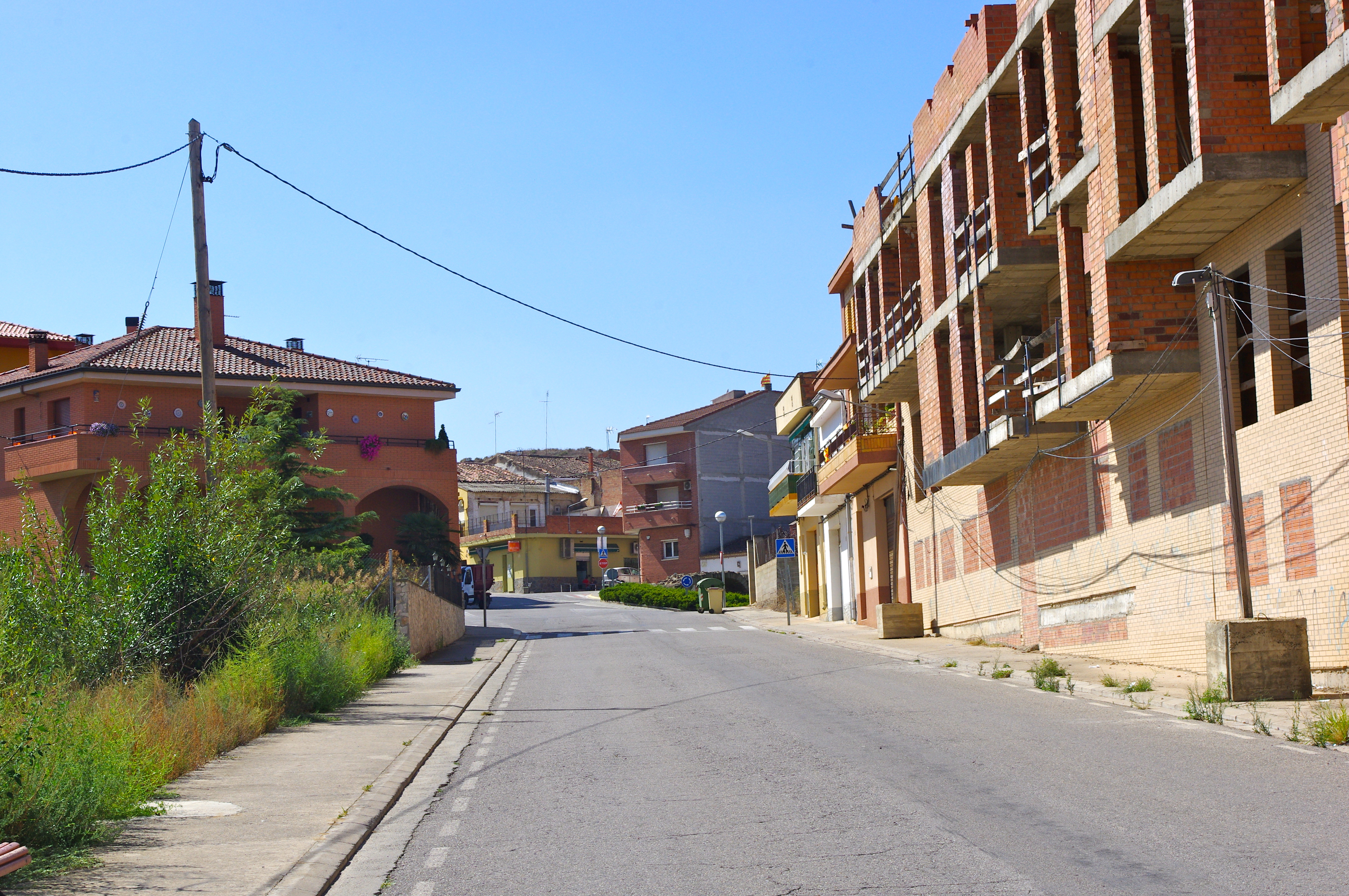

- Flag Coat of arms

- Location in Catalonia
- Coordinates: 41°39′N 0°42′E
- Country: Spain
- Autonomous Community: Catalonia
- Comarca: Segrià
- Province: Lleida

Government
  - Mayor: M. Lluîsa Prat Boneta (2015)

Area
  - Total: 16.7 km^{2} (6.4 sq mi)
- Elevation: 213 m (699 ft)

Population (2025-01-01)
  - Total: 3,640
  - Density: 218/km^{2} (565/sq mi)
- Postal code: 25660
- Website: alcoletge.cat

Alcoletge (Catalan pronunciation: [alkoˈledʒe]) is a village in the province of Lleida and autonomous community of Catalonia, Spain.

It has a population of 3,640 (register office, 2025).

== History ==
Alcoletge was first mentioned in documents from the year 1118, in an agreement between Ramón Berenguer III and Arnau Berenguer of Anglesola. This Count of Barcelona received the castle from Alcoletge de Ibn Hilal (Avifelel), the Almoravid from Lleida. It is precisely the name of this document (al-Kolaia) from which the town received its name. It seems that there was a Visigothic village in the area that was the foundation of the Muslim nucleus. The parish was documented in 1168 and in 1200 it formed part of Lleida. Part of the municipality belonged to the monastery of Junqueras of Barcelona until the end of the feudal system.

During the Catalan Revolt the castle was destroyed and the sixteenth-century shrine which depended on the Junqueras convent, Barcelona, was sacked and in 1665 the location was listed as deserted. The Spanish War of Succession in 1707 caused a second disaster and a second depopulation. The city council of Lleida, which emerged from the Nueva Planta decrees in 1719, appointed a mayor from within the criminal jurisdiction of the location and municipal area of Alcoletge, and this served as the origin of the independent municipality.

== Symbols ==
The coat of arms of Alcoletge is defined by the following blazon:

Losanjado Shield: gold, an open saber castle within two 2 saber elms. For a bell, a mural crown of the people.

It was approved on March 12, 1991.

== Culture ==
The parish church is dedicated to St. Michael. It was built in the eighteenth century, in the neoclassical style, taking the new cathedral of Lleida as a model. It has three naves covered with a groin vault and an ornate façade. In 1936 a Baroque altarpiece from the Old Cathedral of Lleida was destroyed and is kept in this temple.

There is no trace of the old building, which was located on the hill overlooking the village. Arabic pottery from the medieval period was found here. There is also no remnants of the Renaissance manor (Cal Mo) which was used by the Jonqueres nuns and which had a beautiful gallery with arches in the back.

== Celebrations ==
Alcoletge celebrates its major festival in May. The second festival takes place in September.

== Economy ==
The main economic activity is agriculture, with the cultivation of fruit trees, especially pear and apple being the most common. Agricultural cooperative are also present. In recent years, the proximity to the capital (Lleida) has determined the working life of the residents, while agriculture remains the backbone of the economy of the municipality. Cultivated land, some 1,100 ha, represents two-thirds of the municipality. All crops are irrigated, thanks to the Fontanet irrigation and other sources such as from the Segre River, and Canals, which carries water from the Urgell canal.
