= Alcarràs =

- Municipality
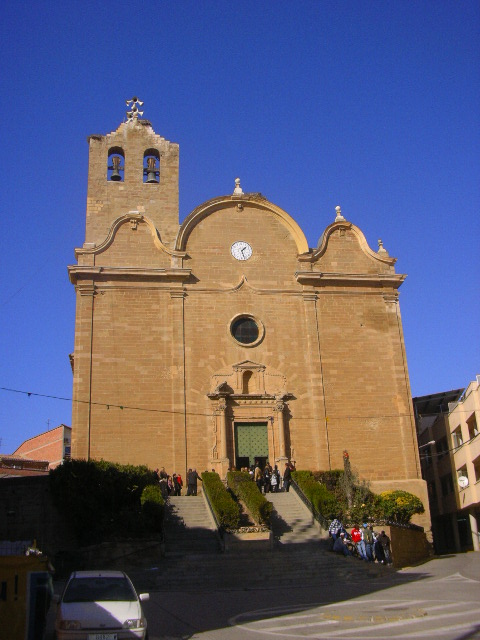

- Flag Coat of arms

- Location in Province of Lleida Location in Catalonia Location in Spain
- Coordinates: 41°33′58″N 0°31′34″E
- Country: Spain
- Community: Catalonia
- Province: Lleida
- Comarca: Segrià

Government
  - Mayor: Miquel Serra Godia (2015)

Area
  - Total: 114.3 km^{2} (44.1 sq mi)
- Elevation: 137 m (449 ft)

Population (2025-01-01)
  - Total: 10,256
  - Density: 89.73/km^{2} (232.4/sq mi)
- Demonyms: Alcarrassí, Alcarrassina
- Website: alcarras.cat

Alcarràs (Western Catalan: [alkaˈras]) is a municipality in the comarca of the Segrià in Catalonia. It includes a small exclave to the south.

It has a population of 10,256 (register office, 2025).

== Etymology ==
Of Arabic origin, in ancient documents (12th century) it appears with the form Alcaraz. According to Arabist Miguel Asín, it would come from the Arabic "al-Karas" with the meaning of "cherry".

== History ==
In the 17th century the population again suffered the consequences of the Reapers' War and the French governor of M. de Rogles occupied the castle (1642), where they put a garrison, and then the castle was definitely disabled as confirmed by Marquis Filipo de Corsini, who accompanied Cosimo de' Medici in 1668, when he says that they found a very ruined population called Alcarràs, belonging to Marquis "di Lafuente" (the successors of the Fernández de Heredia were counts of Fuentes), where the remains of a small castle were barely visible. By inheritance from the aforementioned Heredia, the domain of the place passed to the dukes of Solferino at the beginning of the 18th century, who maintained it until the abolition of the lordships.

Alcarràs also suffered the War of Succession, but in 1721 it had partially recovered and constituted a town hall (since 1500 a small municipal council had been run with three jurats or paers). In the 18th century, coinciding with a notable demographic increase, the great church was built and the nucleus extended along the Madrid road (1777), the current Raval de Lleida.

In the Peninsular War, the residents of Alcarràs became sometent and fought under the orders of Colonel Baget in the Sierra de Alcubierre and the Bruc. The French army occupied the town in 1810, facing the capture of Lleida. The town hosted liberal detachments in the first and third Carlist wars.

Madoz, in the middle of the 19th century, still speaks of some towers of the old castle, which was demolished at the end of the same century. In 1840, with the constitutional town hall, schools were created and in the summer of 1896 the spa of Alcarràs appeared, with ferruginous sodium chloride waters, good for skin diseases until the doors closed in 1920. New industries also appeared (flour, sulfides, brandy, etc.).

Historically irrigated with the Pinyana Canal, at the beginning of the 20th century, the waters of the Aragon and Catalonia Canal also arrived.

=== Referendum of 1 October 2017 ===
During the Catalan Referendum for the Independence on 1 October 2017, Alcarràs was one of the populations where the Spanish police beat the citizens in order to impede the voting. However, the citizens voted with a total of 2,799 votes (53,4% of the registered population), from which 2,578 voted for yes (92.6%) and 171 voted for no (6.1%). A total of 80 anti-riot agents from the Spanish Civil Guard showed up at the voting center at 8:45 am and found 500 people who were peacefully blocking their way. They attacked the people without warning nor previous mediation thus hurting 20 people. The mayor of Alcarràs, Miquel Serra, was judged and sentenced to 3 months of political disqualification and a fine because he "did allow" the referendum.

In September 2022, a few hours after the announcement that the film Alcarràs was elected by the Spanish Academy of Cinema to go to the Oscars, a Wikipedia user with an IP from the Ministry of Defense of the Spanish Government modified the entry in Wikipedia in order to eliminate the data about the violence of the police and to add the quality of "illegal" to the Referendum for the Independence.

=== Alcarràs film ===
In 2022, the town became famous due to the film Alcarràs, of Carla Simón, which won the Golden Bear at the 72nd edition of Berlinale and became the first film in Catalan to receive this award. The film was filmed in the town with its ponentins inhabitants as non-professional actors.

== Symbols ==
The official coat of arms of the municipality was approved in 2007 with the description "caironet coat of arms: argent, a vert holm oak. The timbre, a town crown", which is why it belongs to the category of canting shields, even if it is also considered to represent the centenary oak located within the town. During the 19th and 20th centuries, oval shields alternated with a tree or a castle.

The flag reproduces the old oval shield with a tree on a maroon background.

== Geography ==
The town is connected via the A-2 highway (exit 451: L-800 Vallmanya/Alcarràs) and the AP-2 highway (exit 5: Alcarràs).

The distances from Alcarràs to other cities are: to Lleida 8 km (5 mi), to Barcelona 150 km (93 mi), to Zaragoza 140 km (87 mi), to Huesca 100 km (62 mi), to Tarragona 100 km (62 mi), to Madrid 450 km (280 mi), to France 270 km (170 mi), and to Valencia 325 km (202 mi).

== Population ==
1900–2020

Year	1900	1930	1950	1970	1986	2003	2004	2005	2006	2007	2008	2009	2010	2011	2012	2013	2014	2015	2016	2017	2018	2019	2020
Population	2,342	3,053	3,394	3,969	n/a	4,903	5,027	5,241	5,970	6,510	7,281	7,776	8,029	8,350	8,755	9,026	9,252	9,372	9,297	9,363	9,422	9,514	9,707

== Places of interest ==
- The Centenary Oak is the image of the symbol and municipal shield of the town.
- The Old House of Canonges and Ermita de Santa Anna, a scattered house of the 18th century.
- Montagut Castle, of Saracen origin and of which only a few vestiges remain.
- The Circuit d'Alcarràs, is a motorsport race track inaugurated in May 2007.
- The Church of Mare de Déu de l'Assumpció, built between 1760 and 1765, with a baroque-style facade.
- Joaquim Montoy Library, inaugurated in 2006, has a surface area of 493 m^{2} (5,310 sq ft) and a collection of 18,000 documents.
- Cal Macià, 17th-century farmhouse, the manor house of Eugènia Lamarca, wife of President Francesc Macià.

== Culture and holidays ==
The Municipal Institute of Culture of Alcarràs (IMCA) hosts all the cultural and festive entities and associations of the town. It meets a couple of times a year in order to program and coordinate all the events and activities that will be developed by all these entities and groups.

Holidays specific to the town:

- The major winter holiday, in honor of Saint Sebastian: January 20 (although it lasts four days before or after this date, as appropriate).
- The major summer holiday: the last weekend in August.
