= Tossal Gros (disambiguation) =

Tossal Gros may refer to:

- El Tossal Gros, Mont-ral, Alt Camp
- Tossal Gros, Figuerola del Camp, Alt Camp and Montblanc, Conca de Barberà
- Tossal Gros, Vallclara and Vimbodí i Poblet, Conca de Barberà and Prades, Baix Camp
- Tossal Gros, Juneda, Garrigues
- Tossal Gros, Juncosa, Garrigues
- Tossal Gros, Vinebre and La Palma d'Ebre, Ribera d'Ebre
- Tossal Gros, el Cogul, Garrigues
- Tossal Gros, Arbeca, Garrigues
- Tossal Gros, Vallbona de les Monges, Urgell
- Tossal Gros, Àger, Noguera
- Tossal Gros, Castelló de Farfanya, Noguera
- Tossal Gros, Os de Balaguer, Noguera
- Tossal Gros, Torrelameu, Noguera
- Tossal Gros, l'Espluga Calba, Garrigues
- Tossal Gros, Os de Balaguer, Noguera
- Tossal Gros, Bellver de Cerdanya, Cerdanya
- Tossal Gros, Castell de Mur, Pallars Jussà
- Tossal Gros, formerly in Espluga de Serra, Alta Ribagorça, now in Tremp, Pallars Jussà
- Tossal Gros, La Pobla de Segur, Pallars Jussà
- Tossal Gros, Sarroca de Bellera, Pallars Jussà
- Tossal Gros, Senterada and la La Torre de Cabdella, Pallars Jussà
- Tossal Gros, Tremp, Pallars Jussà
- Tossal Gros, Sanaüja and Biosca, Segarra
- Tossal Gros, Massoteres, Segarra
- Tossal Gros, Alfés and Alcanó, Segrià
- Tossal Gros, Alfés, Segrià
- Tossal Gros, Almatret, Segrià
- Tossal Gros, Alpicat, Segrià
- Tossal Gros, Sarroca de Lleida, Segrià
- Tossal Gros, La Pobla de Massaluca, Terra Alta
- Tossal Gros, Blancafort, Conca de Barberà and Vallbona de les Monges, Urgell
- Tossal Gros, Montagut and Oix, Montagut and Oix, Garrotxa
- Tossal Gros, Serra del Turmell, also known as El Turmell, highest point of the Serra del Turmell, Baix Maestrat, Valencian Community
- Tossal Gros de Vallbona, l'Espluga de Francolí, Conca de Barberà and Vallbona de les Monges, Urgell
- Tossal Gros d'Ollers, Barberà de la Conca, Conca de Barberà
- Tossal Gros, Ulldecona, Montsià
