= Urgell (disambiguation) =

Urgell is a comarca (county) in Ponent, Catalonia, Spain.

Urgell may also refer to:

== People ==
- Modest Urgell, Spanish painter

== Places in Lleida Province, Catalonia, Spain ==
=== Comarcas ===
- Urgell
- Alt Urgell
- Pla d'Urgell

=== Municipalities ===
- Bellcaire d'Urgell, La Noguera
- Bell-lloc d'Urgell, Pla d'Urgell
- Bellmunt d'Urgell, Noguera
- Ivars d'Urgell, Pla d'Urgell
- La Seu d'Urgell, Alt Urgell

=== Other places ===
- County of Urgell, a historic Catalan county

== Other uses ==
- Urgell Beatus, a 10th-century illuminated manuscript
- Urgell (Barcelona Metro), a station in the Barcelona Metro network

== See also ==
- Urgel (disambiguation)
- Urgellet, a historical territory and a natural region of Catalonia
