= Tossal de les Torretes =

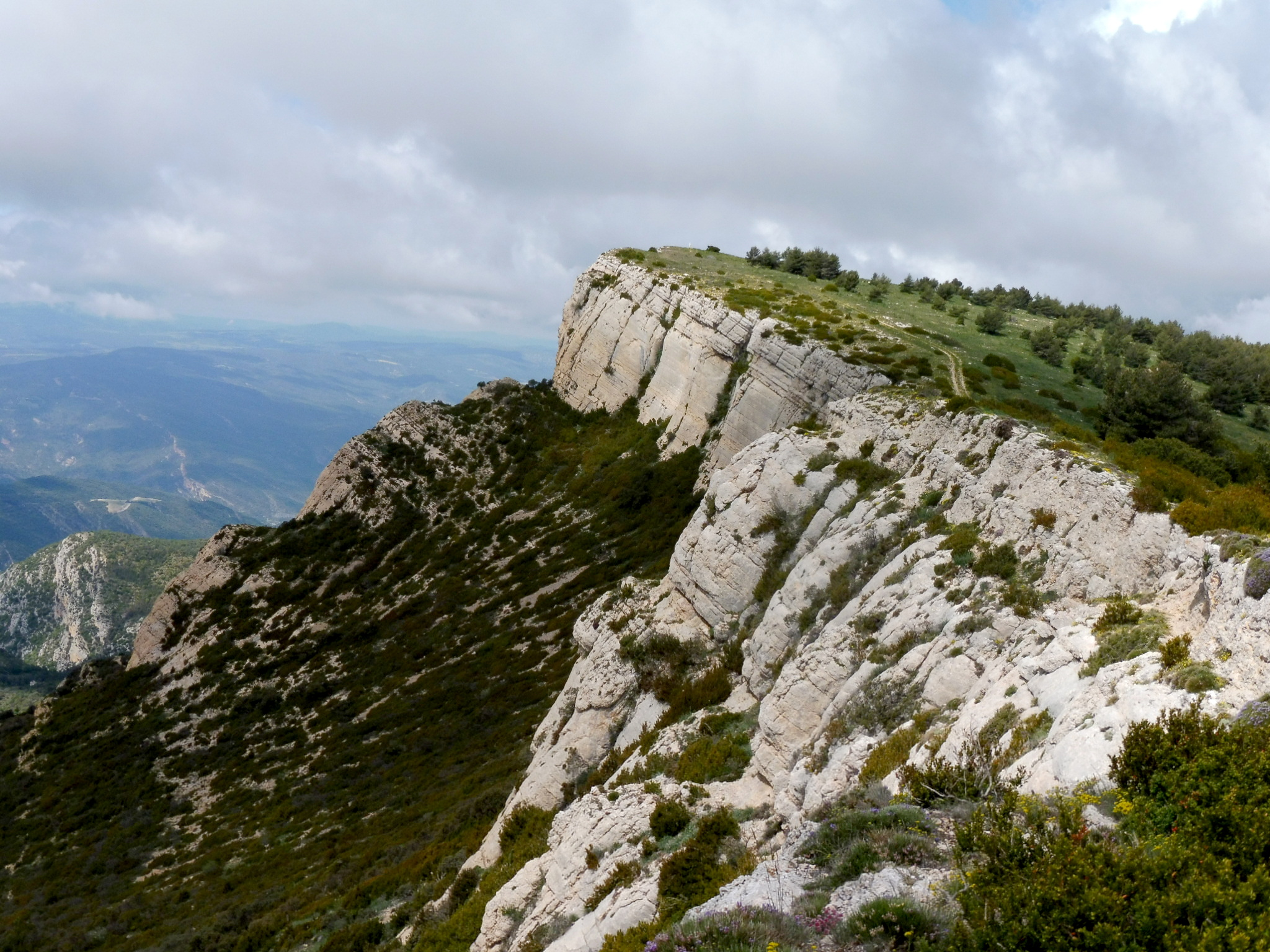

Highest point
- Coordinates: 42°01′19″N 0°56′18″E

Geography
- Location within Catalonia
- Location: Vilanova de Meià (Noguera); Llimiana (Pallars Jussà), Catalonia
- Parent range: Montsec de Rúbies

Climbing
- First ascent: unknown

Tossal de les Torretes is a mountain of Catalonia, Spain. It has an elevation of 1,676 metres above sea level.

== See also ==
- Mountains of Catalonia
