= Vallfogona =

Vallfogona may refer to several places in Catalonia, Spain:

- Vallfogona de Balaguer
- Vallfogona de Ripollès
- Vallfogona de Riucorb
- Vallfogona, in the municipality of La Pobla de Lillet
