= Bellcaire =

Bellcaire may refer to:

- Bellcaire d'Empordà
- Bellcaire d'Urgell
