= Meritxell Serret =

Catalan politician

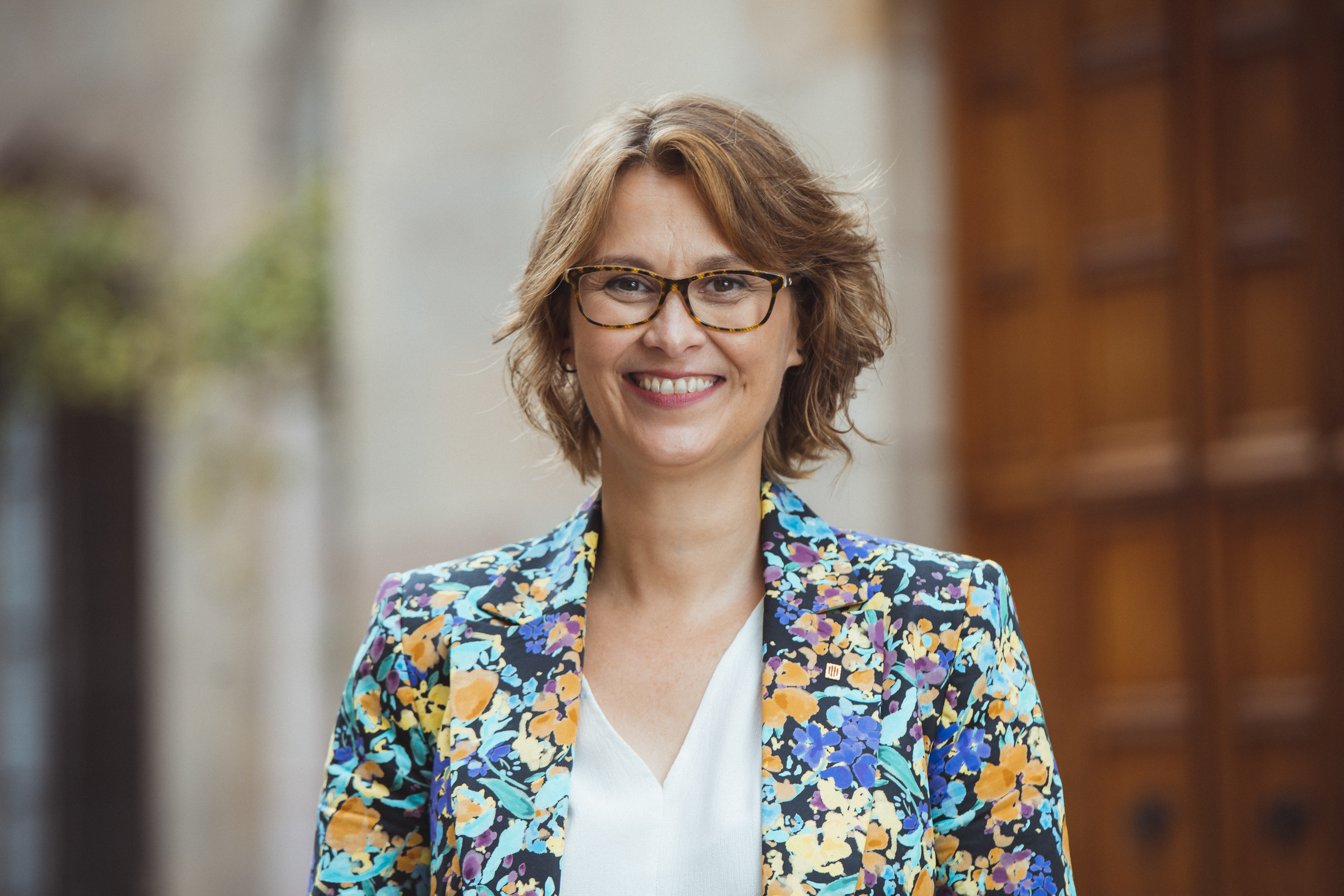

Minister of Foreign Action and European Union of Catalonia
- In office 10 October 2022 – 12 August 2024
- President: Pere Aragonès
- Preceded by: Victòria Alsina
- Succeeded by: Jaume Duch

Minister of Agriculture, Livestock, Fisheries and Food of Catalonia
- In office 14 January 2016 – 27 October 2017
- President: Carles Puigdemont
- Preceded by: Jordi Ciuraneta Riu
- Succeeded by: Teresa Jordà (Direct rule until 2 June 2018)

Member of the Vallfogona de Balaguer Municipal Council
- In office 2007–2011

Personal details
- Born: Meritxell Serret Aleu; 19 June 1975 (age 51) Vallfogona de Balaguer, Catalonia, Spain
- Education: Autonomous University of Barcelona

Meritxell Serret Aleu (born 19 June 1975) is a Catalan politician, who served as Minister of Foreign Action and European Union of Catalonia and Minister of Agriculture, Livestock, Fisheries and Food.

== Life and career ==
Serret was born in Vallfogona of Balaguer, Catalonia, Spain. She has a degree in Political Sciences and Administration from the Autonomous University of Barcelona and has additional degrees in General Management from the Open University of Catalonia. She speaks four languages: Spanish, English, French and Catalan.

In her career, Serret has held a managerial position for Provedella, a centre that promotes beef, has been in charge of organizational tasks in the Unió de Pagesos (Farmers Union), and as a technical coordinator for the Fundació del Mon Rural (Rural World Foundation).

She has been president of the Cultural Association The Xop of Vallfogona of Balaguer since 2009.

Serret was councillor of the City council of Vallfogona of Balaguer as an independent for Republican Left of Catalonia.

As an activist she has been a member of the national secretariat and coordinator of the political incidence committee of the Catalan National Assembly.

On January 13, 2016, Serret was appointed Minister of Agriculture, Livestock, Fisheries and Food by the President of the Catalan Government, Carles Puigdemont. She was sworn in on January 14.

Serret moved to Belgium with Carles Puigdemont and three other Catalan ex-ministers after the declaration of independence of Catalonia. She returned to Spain in 2021.
