= Montgai =

- Municipality
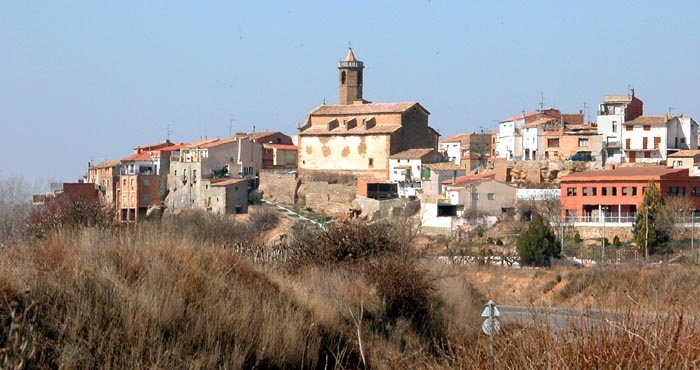
- Butsènit d'Urgell village

- Coat of arms

- Location in Catalonia
- Coordinates: 41°47′59″N 0°57′39″E
- Country: Spain
- Community: Catalonia
- Province: Lleida
- Comarca: Noguera

Government
  - Mayor: Jaume Gilabert Torruella (2015)

Area
  - Total: 28.9 km^{2} (11.2 sq mi)
- Elevation: 286 m (938 ft)

Population (2025-01-01)
  - Total: 640
  - Density: 22/km^{2} (57/sq mi)
- Postal code: 25616
- Website: www.montgai.cat

Montgai (Catalan pronunciation: [moŋˈgaj]) is a municipality in the province of Lleida and autonomous community of Catalonia, Spain. It is situated in the valley of the river Sió among the hills of Bellmunt in the south and the mountains of Montclar in the north.

It has a population of 640 (register office, 2025).

The municipality consists of two villages: Montgai and Butsènit d'Urgell.

== Economy ==
The economy is based in the agricultural activities. The expansion of cultivated land is quite divided between dry and irrigated land.

== Population ==
In the 20th century Montgai had 27 houses, and increased the number of inhabitants until the 1930s. Then, it started a decrease because of economic crisis in the agriculture, and today there are 663 citizens.

Historical population

Year	Pop.	±%
1718	119	—
1787	212	+78.2%
1857	1,013	+377.8%
1877	1,139	+12.4%
1887	1,083	−4.9%
1900	1,205	+11.3%
1910	1,270	+5.4%
1920	1,351	+6.4%
1930	1,520	+12.5%
1940	1,168	−23.2%
1950	1,198	+2.6%

Year	Pop.	±%
1960	1,178	−1.7%
1970	1,013	−14.0%
1980	915	−9.7%
1990	862	−5.8%
2000	789	−8.5%
2001	790	+0.1%
2002	795	+0.6%
2003	819	+3.0%
2004	793	−3.2%
2005	780	−1.6%
2006	772	−1.0%

Year	Pop.	±%
2007	740	−4.1%
2008	731	−1.2%
2009	727	−0.5%
2010	718	−1.2%
2011	720	+0.3%
2012	701	−2.6%
2013	688	−1.9%
2014	671	−2.5%
2015	663	−1.2%

== Montgai: the village ==
In the middle of the village there is the church Mare de Déu de l'Assumpció, built in the mid-eighteenth century.

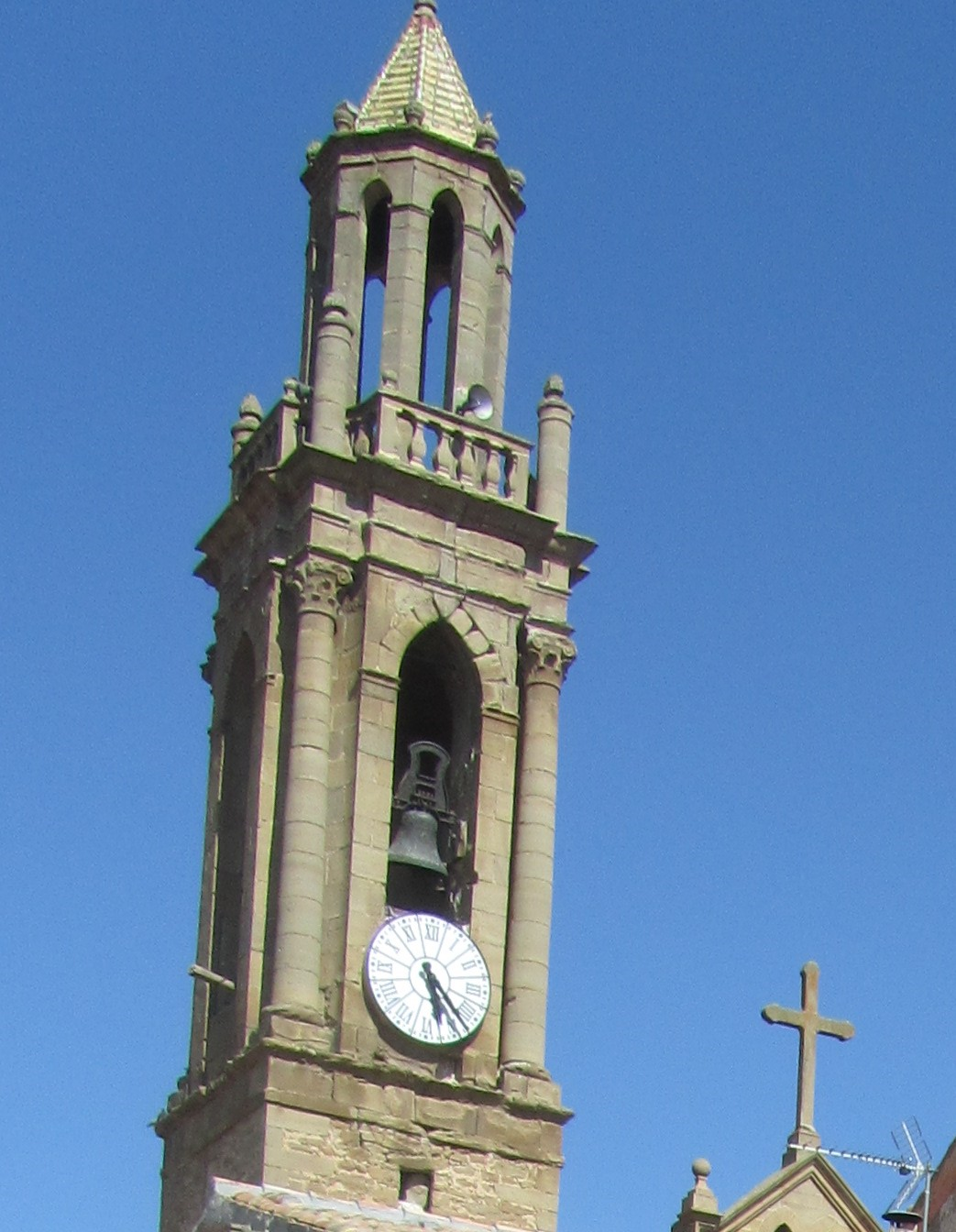
The Bell tower of the church Mare de Déu de l'Assumpció.

== Butsènit d'Urgell ==
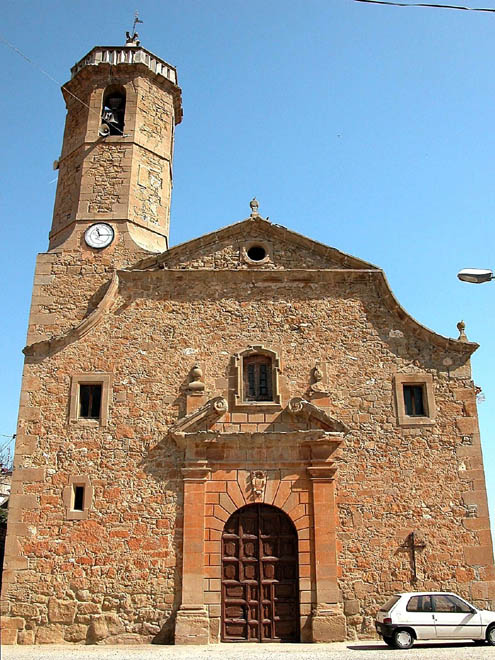
Church of Butsènit built in the 18th century
