= Foradada =

- Municipality
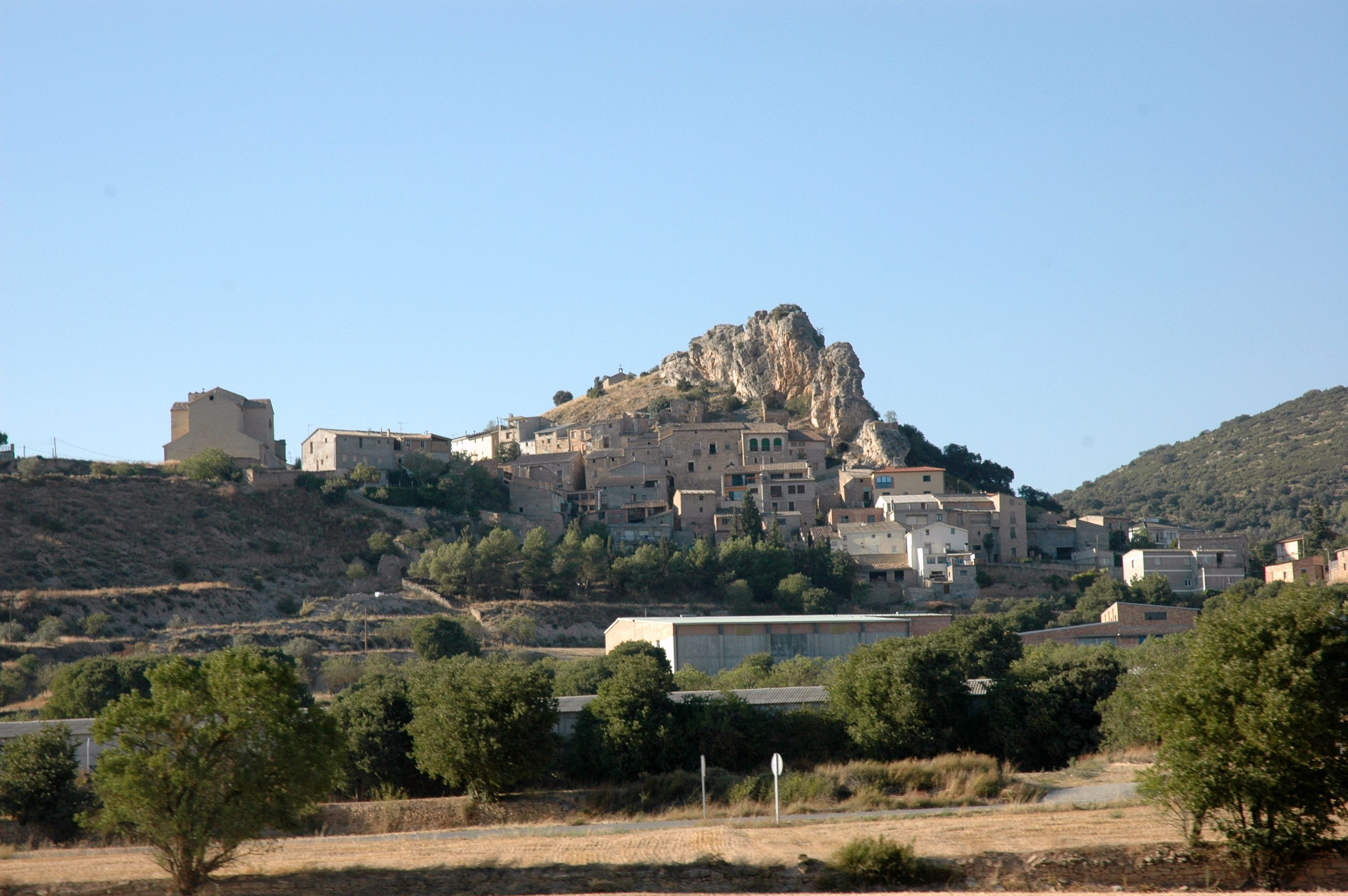

- Flag Coat of arms

- Location in Catalonia
- Coordinates: 41°52′44″N 1°0′50″E
- Country: Spain
- Community: Catalonia
- Province: Lleida
- Comarca: La Noguera

Government
  - Mayor: Maricel Segú Peralba (2015)

Area
  - Total: 28.6 km^{2} (11.0 sq mi)
- Elevation: 455 m (1,493 ft)

Population (2025-01-01)
  - Total: 193
  - Density: 6.75/km^{2} (17.5/sq mi)
- Postal code: 25737
- Website: www.ccnoguera.cat/foradada

For people with the surname, see Foradada (surname).

Foradada (Catalan pronunciation: [foɾaˈðaða]) is a municipality in the comarca of Noguera, in the province of Lleida, Catalonia, Spain. It has a population of 193 (register office, 2025).
