= Gaspar de Portolá =

Spanish Army officer and colonial administrator

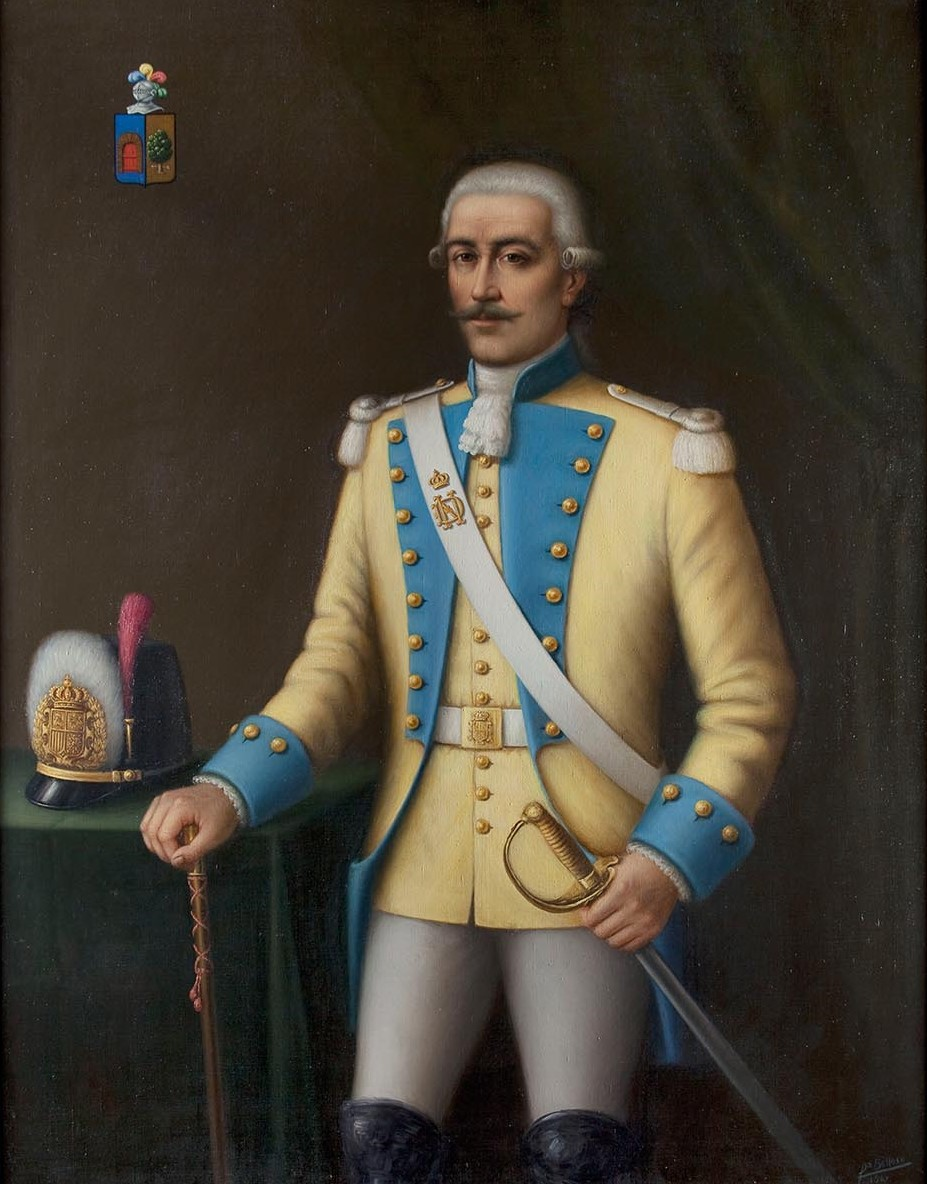

Governor of the Californias
- In office November 30, 1767 – July 9, 1770
- Monarch: Charles III
- Preceded by: Office established
- Succeeded by: Pedro Fages

Personal details
- Born: Gaspar de Portolà i Rovira; January 1, 1716 Os de Balaguer, Catalonia
- Died: October 10, 1786 (aged 70) Lleida, Catalonia
- Resting place: Lleida, Catalonia

Military service
- Allegiance: Spain
- Branch/service: Spain Army
- Rank: Captain

Don Gaspar de Portolá y Rovira (Spanish pronunciation: [ɡasˈpaɾ ðe poɾtoˈla i roˈβiɾa] gas-PAR de por-to-LA i ro-BI-ra) was a Spanish Army officer and colonial administrator who served as the first governor of the Californias from 1767 to 1770. Born in Catalonia into an aristocratic family, he is best known for leading the Portolá expedition into California, which laid the foundations of Spanish rule in the region Californian cities like San Diego and Monterey, and bestowed names to geographic features throughout California, many of which are still in use.

== Early life ==
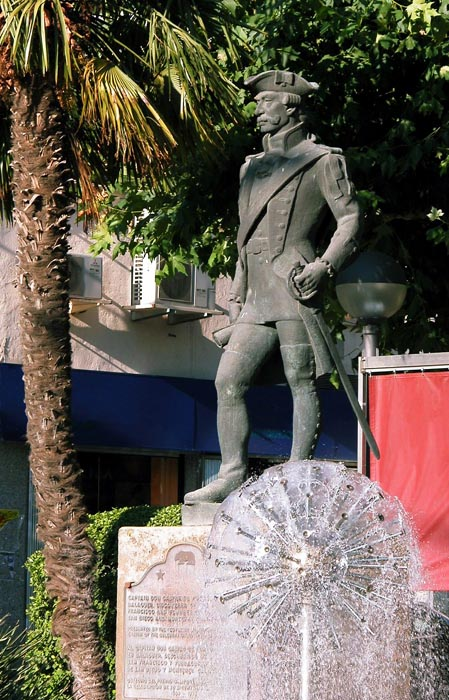
Monument to Portolá in Balaguer, Catalonia.

Gaspar de Portolá y Rovira was born on January 1, 1716 in Os de Balaguer, Catalonia, into a family of minor Catalan nobility. After he came of age, Portolá joined the Spanish Army, being commissioned as an ensign in 1734 and a lieutenant in 1743. He saw service in Italy during the War of the Austrian Succession and participated in the Spanish invasion of Portugal during the Fantastic War. Following the expulsion of the Jesuits from the Spanish Empire, Portolá was tasked with removing the Jesuits from Spanish missions in Baja California. He then ensured the missions were turned over to the Franciscans and later to the Dominicans.

== Expedition to Las Californias ==
Spain was driven to establish missions and other outposts on the Pacific Coast north of the Baja California Peninsula by fears that the territory would be claimed by competing foreign powers, in addition to its Catholic proselytizing mission and need for additional sources of income. The British, who had established several colonies on the East Coast of North America, had also sent explorers into the Pacific. Russian fur hunters were pressing east from Siberia across the Bering Strait into the Aleutian Islands and beyond.

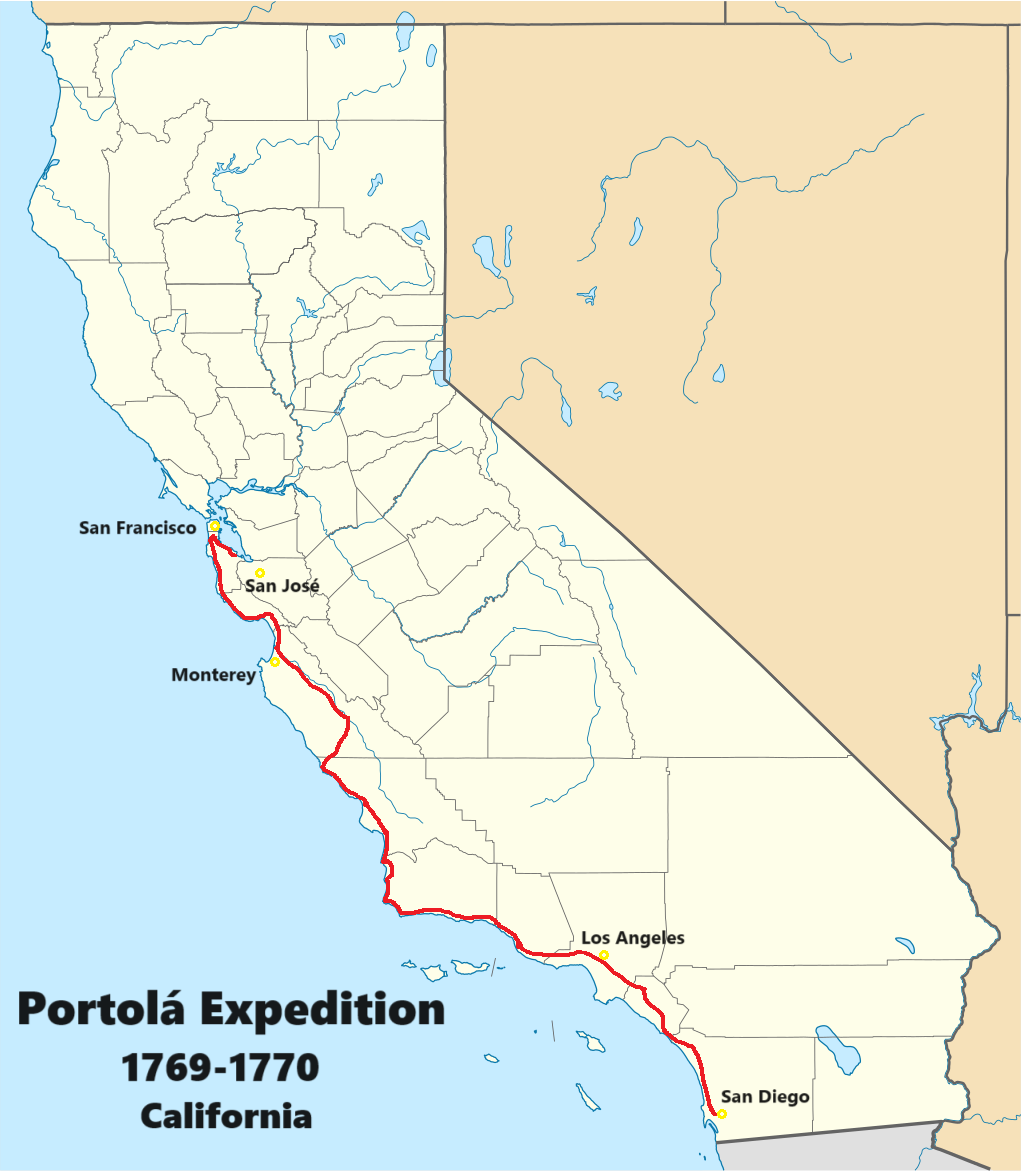
Map of the Portolá expedition

Dispatches of January 23, 1768, exchanged between King Carlos and the viceroy, set the wheels in motion to extend Spain's control up the Pacific Coast and establish colonies and missions at San Diego Bay and Monterey Bay, which had been discovered and described in reports by earlier explorers Juan Cabrillo and Sebastián Vizcaíno. Vizcaíno had mapped the California coastline as far north as Monterey in 1602, but no significant Spanish settlement or even trading station had followed because those earlier explorations had failed to find a good harbor that the Spanish could have used for their long-standing Pacific maritime trade between Asia and Mexico: Monterey Bay, sighted by both Cabrillo and Vizcaíno, was exposed to rough currents and winds.

In May 1768, the Spanish Visitor General, José de Gálvez, began to organize an expedition, by sea and by land. Portolá was created "Governor of the Californias" and given overall command. Junípero Serra, leader of the expedition's Franciscan missionaries, took command of spiritual matters. Sea and land detachments were to meet at San Diego Bay.

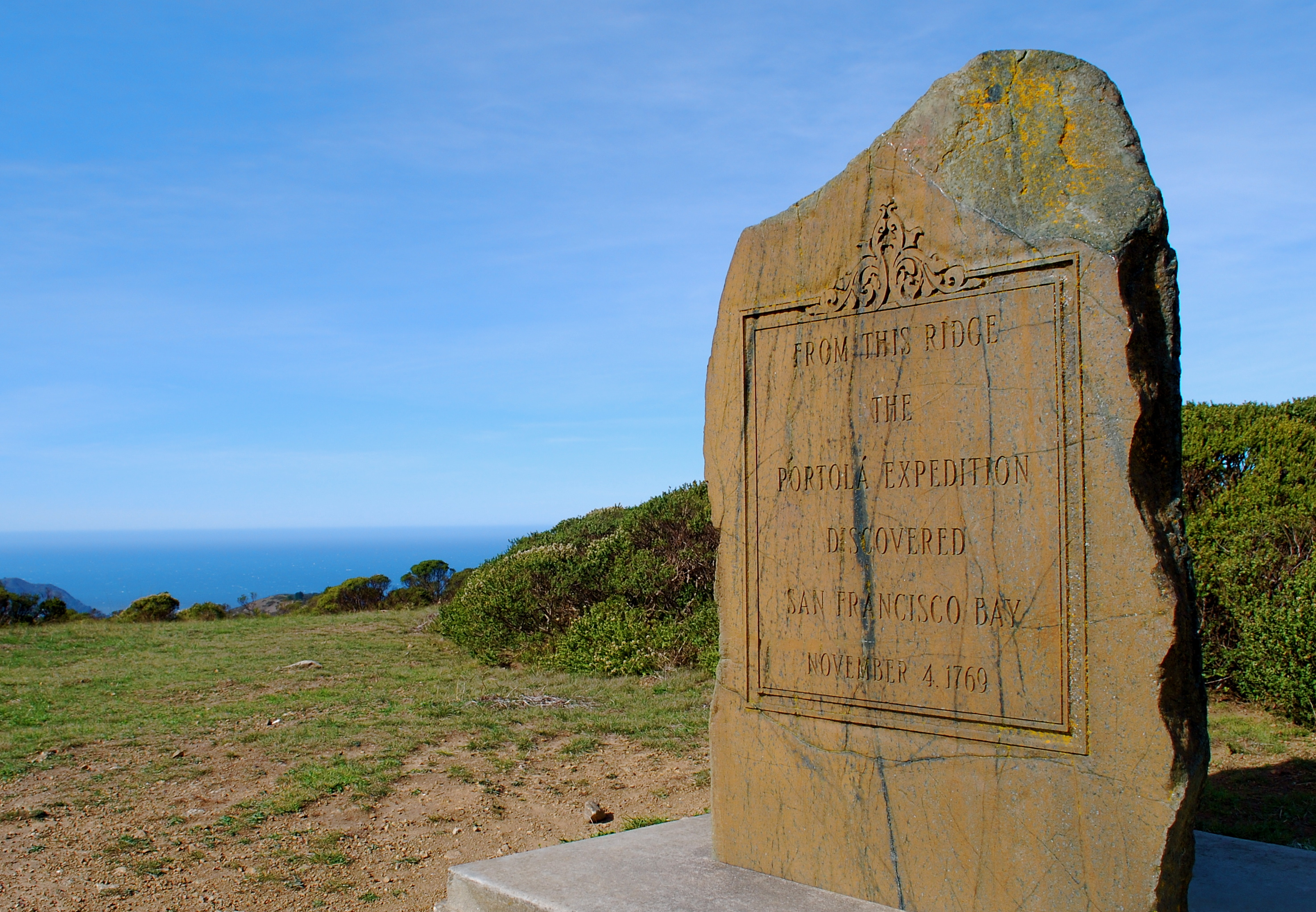
Portolá expedition monument in Pacifica, California honoring Portolá's first sighting of San Francisco Bay.

The first ship, the San Carlos, sailed from La Paz on January 10, 1769 and a second, the San Antonio sailed from Cabo San Lucas on February 15. At the same time, the various elements of the land parties began to move north from Loreto, Baja California Sur. The land expedition was assembled at Velicatá, where Serra established his first new mission. From there, Portolá's plan called for splitting the land expedition in two. The lead group, charged with building a wagon trail and pacifying the natives, was led by Captain Fernando Rivera y Moncada, and departed from Velicatá on March 24. With Rivera was the priest Juan Crespí, diarist for the Franciscans. The expedition led by Portolá, which included Junípero Serra (the President of the Missions), along with a combination of missionaries, settlers, and leather-jacket soldiers, including José Raimundo Carrillo, left Velicatá on May 15. Junípero Serra founded two more missions during the expedition: San Diego de Alcalá on July 16, 1769 and Mission San Carlos Borromeo de Carmelo on June 3, 1770.

Rivera reached the site of present-day San Diego in May, established a camp in the area that is now Old Town and awaited the arrival of the others. Because of an error by Vizcaíno in determining the latitude of the San Diego Harbor, the ships passed by it and landed too far north before finding their way back. The San Antonio arrived on April 11 and the San Carlos, the first ship to leave La Paz, having met with fierce winds and storms on the journey, arrived on April 29. A third vessel was to follow with supplies, but it was probably lost at sea. The land expedition of Portolá arrived on June 29. After their arduous journeys, most of the men aboard ship were ill, chiefly from scurvy, and many had died. Out of a total of 219 who left Baja California, little more than 100 now survived.

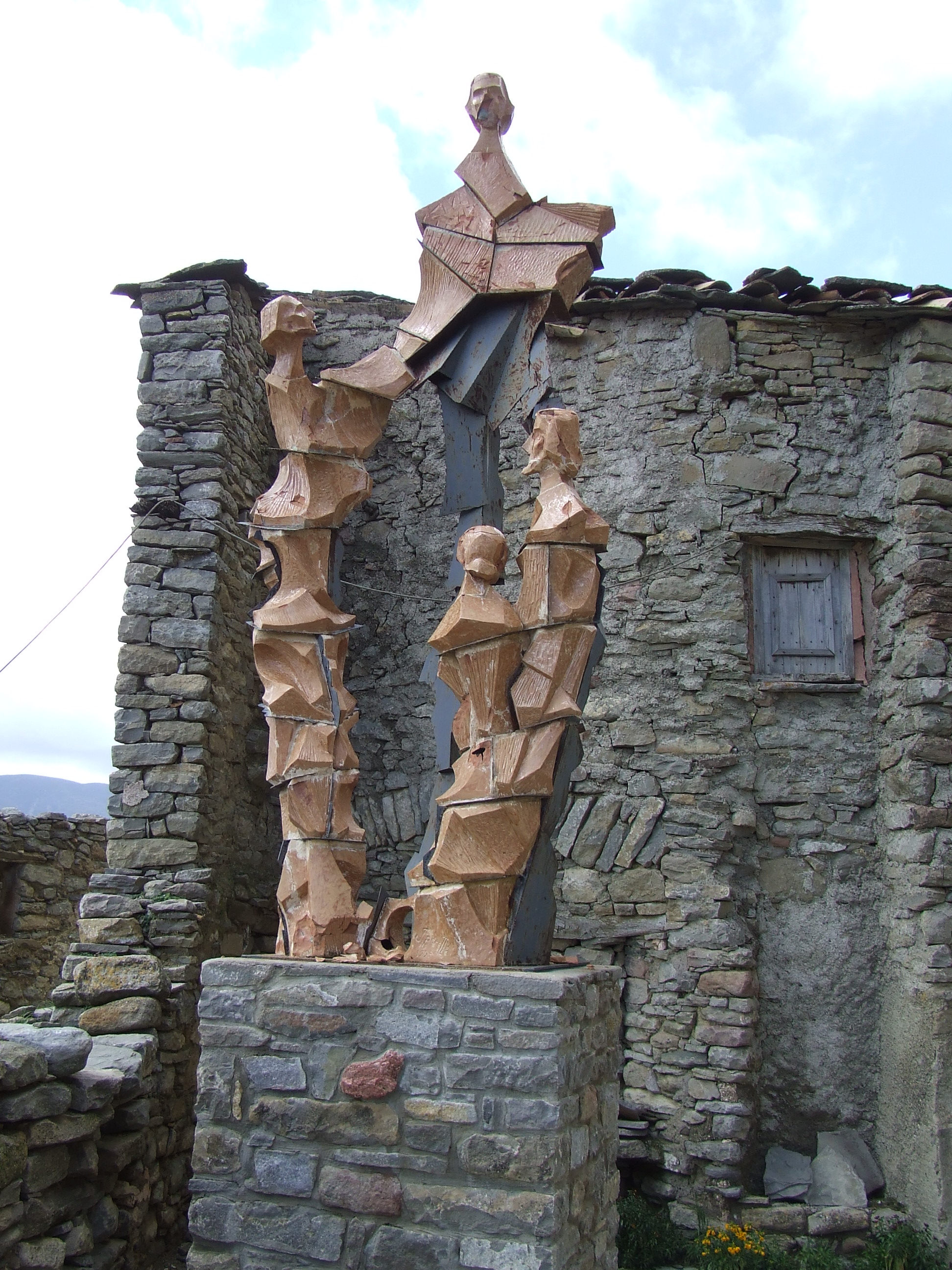
Monument to Portolá in Sant Esteve de la Sarga, Catalonia.

Eager to press on to Monterey Bay, Portolá and his expedition, consisting of Juan Crespí, 63 leather-jacket soldiers and 100 mules loaded down with provisions, headed north on July 14, 1769, marching two to four leagues (1 league = 2.6 miles) a day. The expedition recorded an earthquake on July 28 at the Santa Ana River. On July 29 they reached the site of present-day Fullerton, California at Hillcrest Park. On July 30, the expedition crossed the Puente Hills at a pass in La Habra (North Harbor Boulevard). They moved north-west to the San Gabriel River (near El Monte) where they built a bridge to cross over. This bridge ('La Puente' in Crespi's diary) is remembered in the name of today's nearby city of La Puente. They arrived in what is now Los Angeles on August 2 (where the Los Angeles River and Arroyo Seco river meet). The following day, they marched out the Indian trail that would one day become Wilshire Boulevard to the present site of Santa Monica. Winding around to the area of later Saugus, now part of Santa Clarita, they reached the area to become Santa Barbara on August 19, and the present-day San Simeon area on September 13. Unable to remain on the coast due to the steep, difficult terrain, the party turned inland. They marched through the San Antonio Valley and on October 1, Portolá's party emerged from the Santa Lucia Mountains and reached the mouth of the Salinas River.

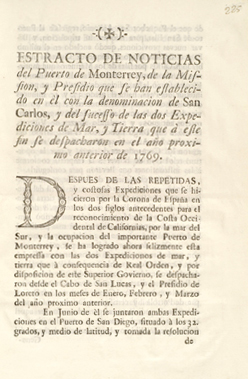
The famous Estracto de Noticias written by Portolá in 1770 is the first published account of Spanish settlements in California.

After a march of some 400 miles (640 km) from San Diego and about 1,000 miles (1,600 km) from Velicatá, they had reached the bay they were seeking. But they failed to discern the coastline's semi-circular shape, described by Vizcaíno as round like an "O", even though members of the party had twice marched along its beach. Having failed to find their goal, they marched on north and reached the area at the north end of the bay, where Crespí named a creek Santa Cruz on October 18. Pushing on, they reached a creek in the present-day town of Pacifica on October 31.

On November 4, having crossed the low coastal mountain range above the creek, the party was stunned to catch a glimpse of the enormous San Francisco Bay from the mountain range, as the bay was previously unknown to the Spanish. This sighting was crucial to the later settlement of California because unlike Monterey Bay, it was surrounded by land on all sides except the Golden Gate, and thus it was not exposed to rough ocean currents as was Monterey Bay, which had been known to the Spanish since Cabrillo's exploration in the sixteenth century. Despite the earlier explorations of Cabrillo and Vizcaíno, and despite two centuries of Spanish sailing the Pacific for trade between Asia and Mexico, the San Francisco Bay had been missed because of the fog that frequently shrouded its entrance. If the San Francisco Bay had been discovered earlier, the region surrounding would have been settled by the Spanish earlier since it would have provided a safe, convenient harbor for Spain's Pacific maritime trade.

Portolá's party then headed back to San Diego, exploring and naming many localities in the region south of what eventually became known as the Golden Gate. Surviving on mule meat for most of the journey, they arrived on January 24, 1770.

On their way past Monterey Bay, they again failed to recognize it as the same bay that Vizcaíno had described in 1602.

== Second expedition ==
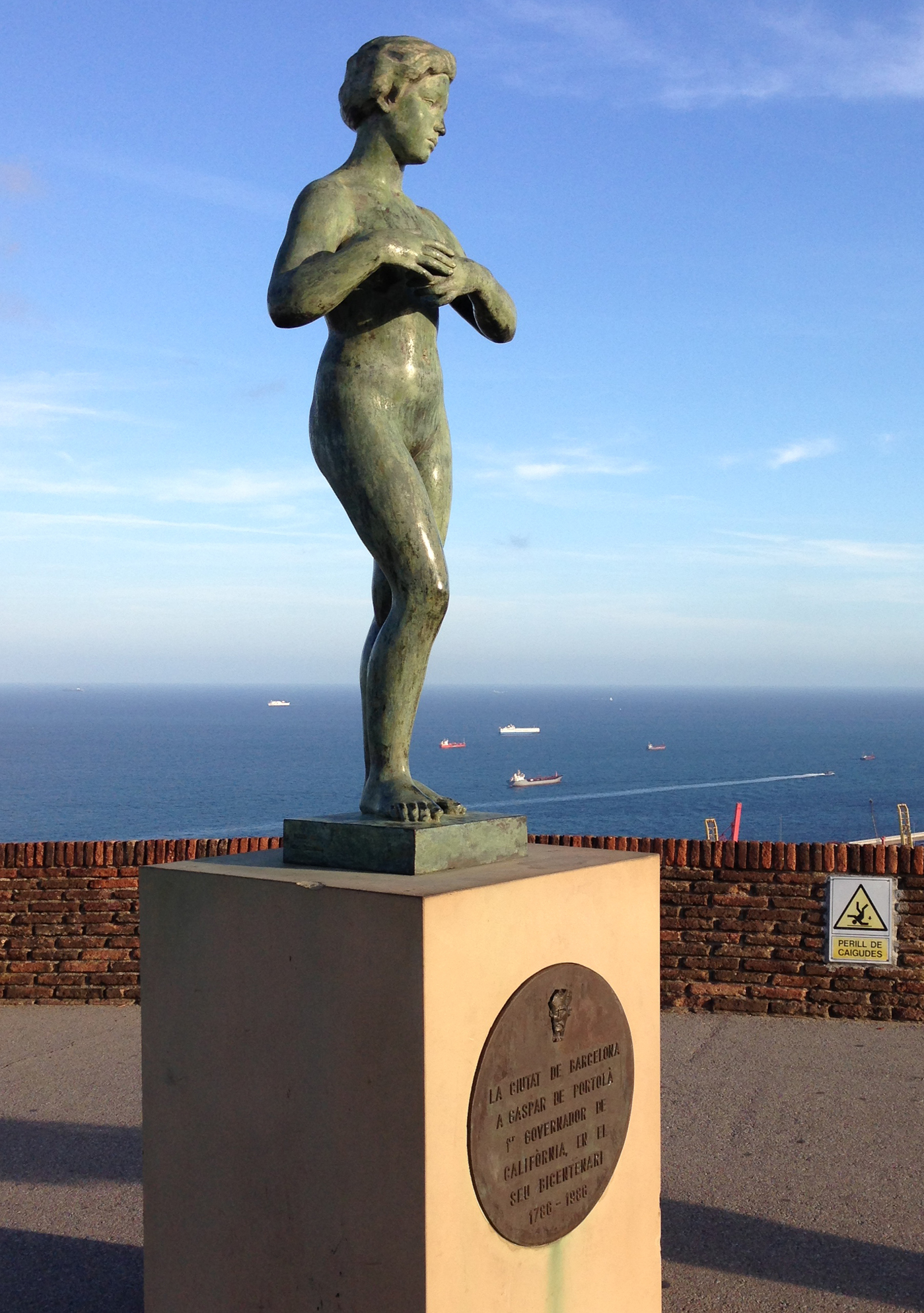
Monument to Portolá at Montjuïc Castle in Barcelona, by Catalan sculptor Lluís Montané i Mollfulleda.

One of Portolá's officers, Captain Vicente Vila, convinced him that he had actually been exactly on the Bay of Monterey when he placed his second cross at what later became Pacific Grove. After replenishing supplies at San Diego, Portolá and Serra decided on a joint expedition by land and sea to again search for the bay and establish a colony if they were successful. The San Antonio sailed on April 16, 1770. On board were Serra, Miguel Costansó, military engineer and cartographer, and Doctor Pedro Prat, army surgeon, along with a cargo of supplies for the new mission at Monterey. On April 17, after mustering what forces he could, Portolá's land expedition, which included lieutenant Pedro Fages, 12 Spanish volunteers, seven leather-jacket soldiers, five Baja California Indians, two muleteers, and Juan Crespí serving as the expedition's chaplain, again marched north.

The expedition followed the same route they had the previous winter while returning to San Diego. After 36 days on the road, with only two days of rest, Portolá arrived at his second cross on May 24, 1770. He then saw that on a clear day and from a certain point of view the round harbor assumed the proportions described by the earlier enthusiastic explorers. Having recognized the bay, a Mass was conducted near the oak tree that the Carmelite missionaries with Vizcaíno had worshiped under in 1603, and possession was officially taken. On June 3, 1770, they laid the beginnings of the Mission San Carlos Borromeo de Carmelo and founded the Presidio of Monterey.

== Later life ==
Governor Portolá's task was finished. He then left Captain Pedro Fages in charge, and on June 9 he sailed for San Blas, never to return to Upper California. In 1776, Portolá was appointed the governor of Puebla. After the appointment of his successor in 1784, he was advanced money for expenses and returned to Spain, where he served as commander of the Numancia cavalry dragoon regiment. On February 7, 1786 he was appointed King's Lieutenant for the strongholds and castles of Lleida. He died that same year, in October.

== Memorials ==
A 9-foot (3 m) statue in Pacifica, California was sculpted by the Catalan sculptor Josep Maria Subirachs and his associate, Francesc Carulla. It was gifted to the people of California by the Catalan government in 1988. The statue was taken down on January 18, 2024, after years of liberal complaints that the statue was honoring European colonization in the area. A ten-foot high oil-on-canvas portrait of Portolá by Albert Herter in 1929 hangs in the Los Angeles Central Library's History Room.

In California, Portolà's namesake was given to the city of Portola in Plumas County, the town of Portola Valley in San Mateo County, the area of Portola Springs in Irvine and the Portola District in San Francisco.

A number of schools in California were also named after him, including Portola Hills Elementary School in Portola Hills, Portola Elementary School in San Bruno, Gaspar de Portola Middle School in Tierrasanta, Portola Middle School in Tarzana, Portola Middle School in Orange, and Portola Springs Elementary School and Portola High School in Irvine. The school in Orange is close to the spot where the expedition crossed the Santa Ana River, and the school has a 60-foot mural depicting the Portolà Expedition.

Portola Parkway running through Irvine and Lake Forest (though not connected as of 2018), was also named after Portolà. It is said that Portolà used the same route Portola Parkway now runs across. Portola Drive, which runs parallel to and near the Monterey Bay shoreline, is the main street of the Pleasure Point area of Santa Cruz County. Portola Avenue is also a north-south street located in Palm Desert in the Coachella Valley.

In World War II, the United States Liberty ship SS Gaspar de Portola was named in his honor.

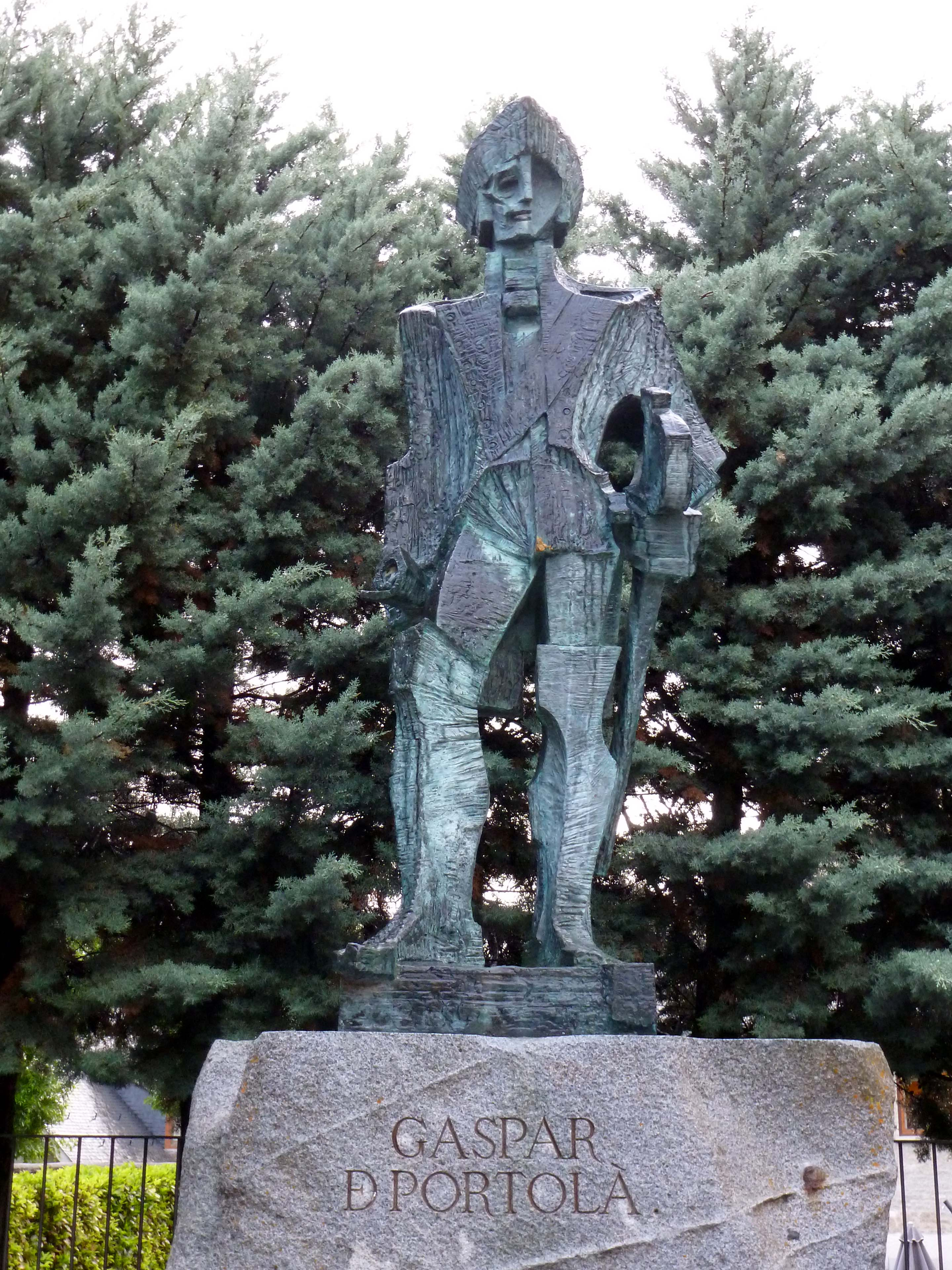
Twin statues of Gaspar de Portolá by Catalan sculptor Josep Maria Subirachs located in Arties, Catalonia

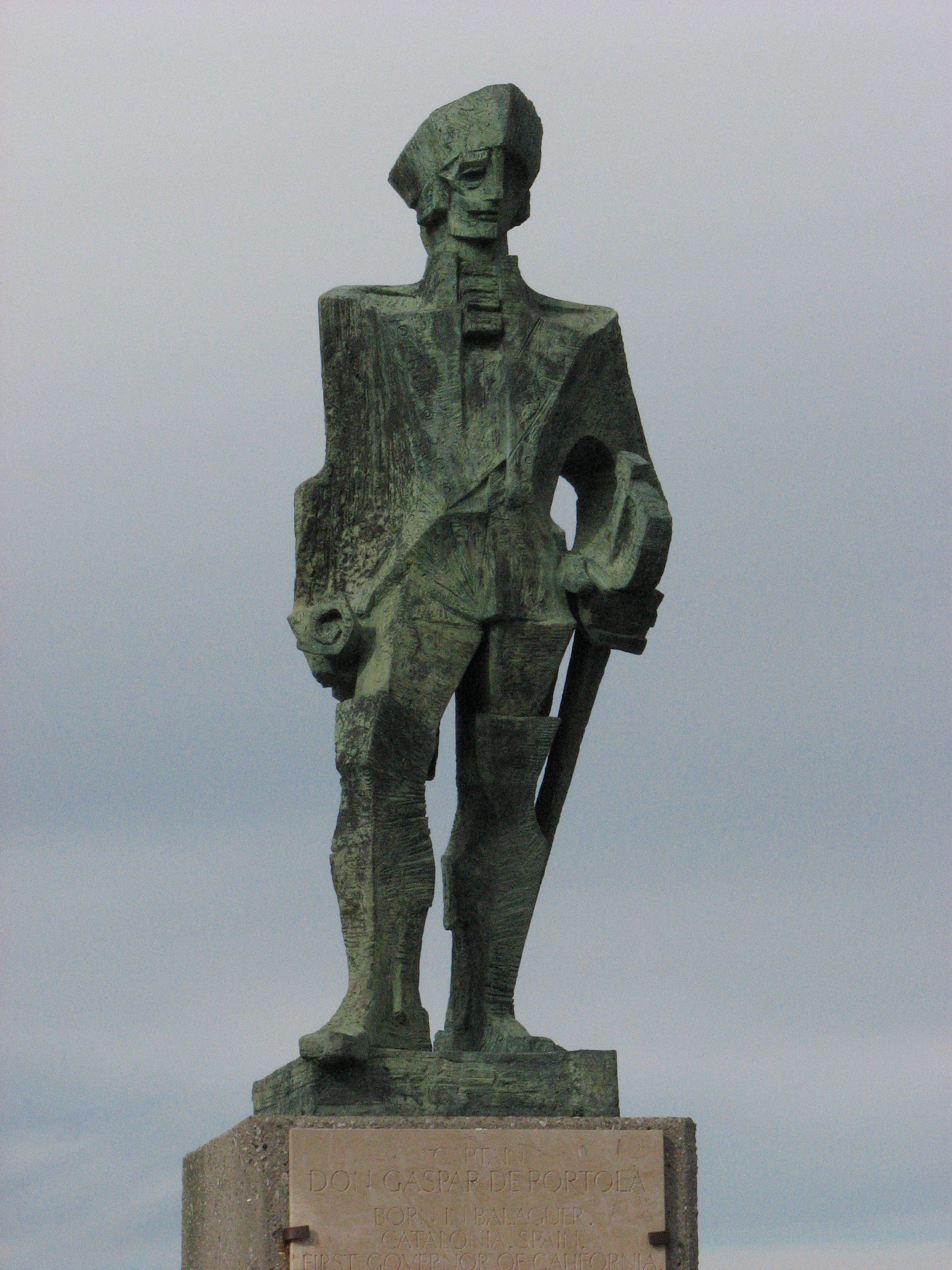
& Pacifica, California gifted to Californians by the Generalitat of Catalonia in 1988.

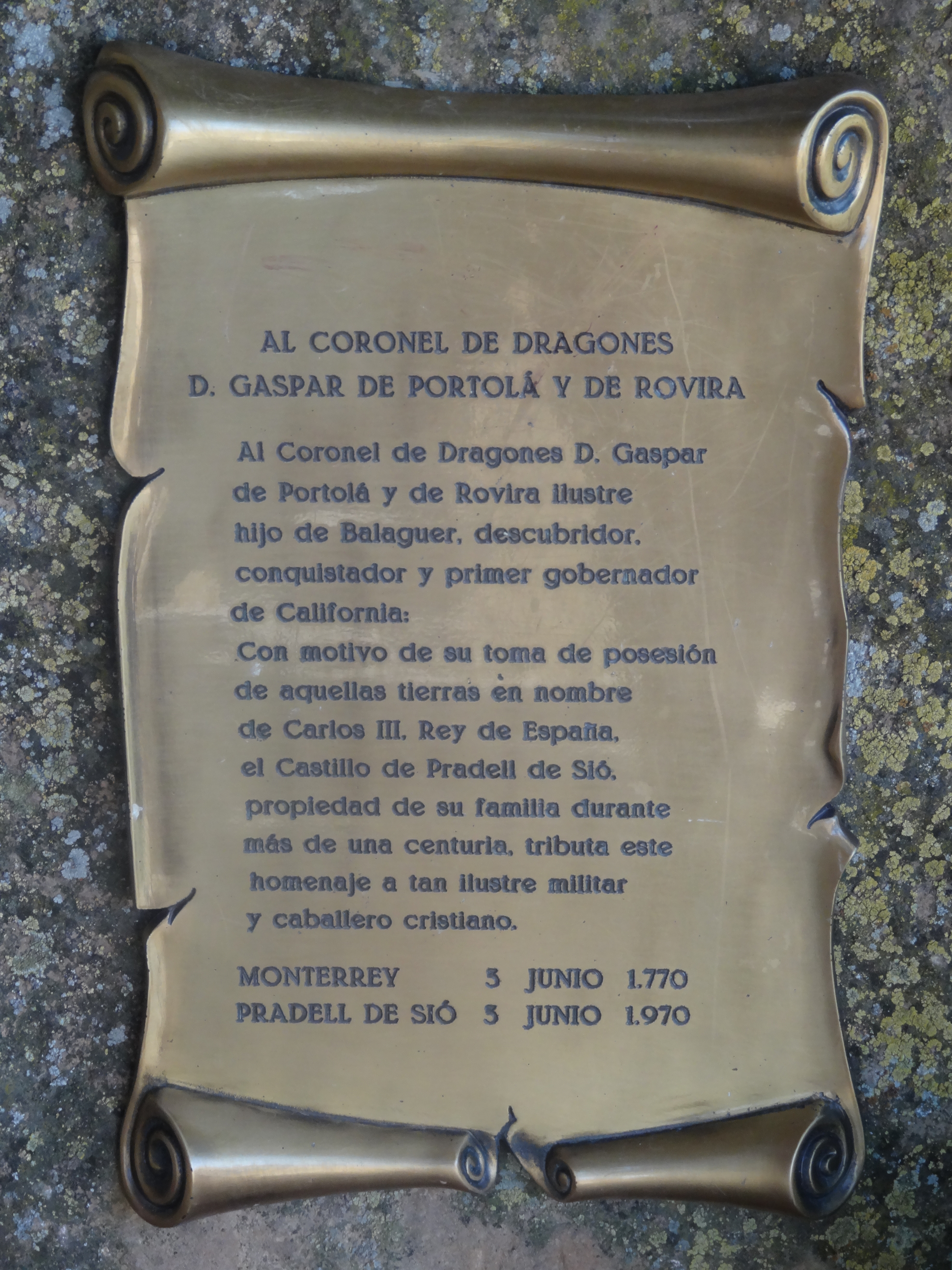
Plaque at Portolà's family ancestral home, Castle of Pradell de Sió, in Preixens.

== Further information ==
- Alvarez, Jose Manuel Serrano. "Gaspar de Portolá and Rovira". Real Academia de la Historia (in Spanish).
- Crespí, Juan; Alan K Brown (2001). A Description of Distant Roads: Original Journals of the First Expedition into California, 1769–1770. San Diego: San Diego State University Press. ISBN 1-879691-64-7.
- Howgego, Raymond John, ed. (2003). "Portola, Gaspar de". Encyclopedia of Exploration to 1800. Hordern House. pp. 853–854. ISBN 1875567364.
- Nuttall, Donald A. (1971). "Gaspar de Portolá: Disenchanted Conquistador of Spanish Upper California". Southern California Quarterly. 53 (3): 185–198. doi:10.2307/41170367. JSTOR 41170367.
