= Ivars de Noguera =

- Municipality
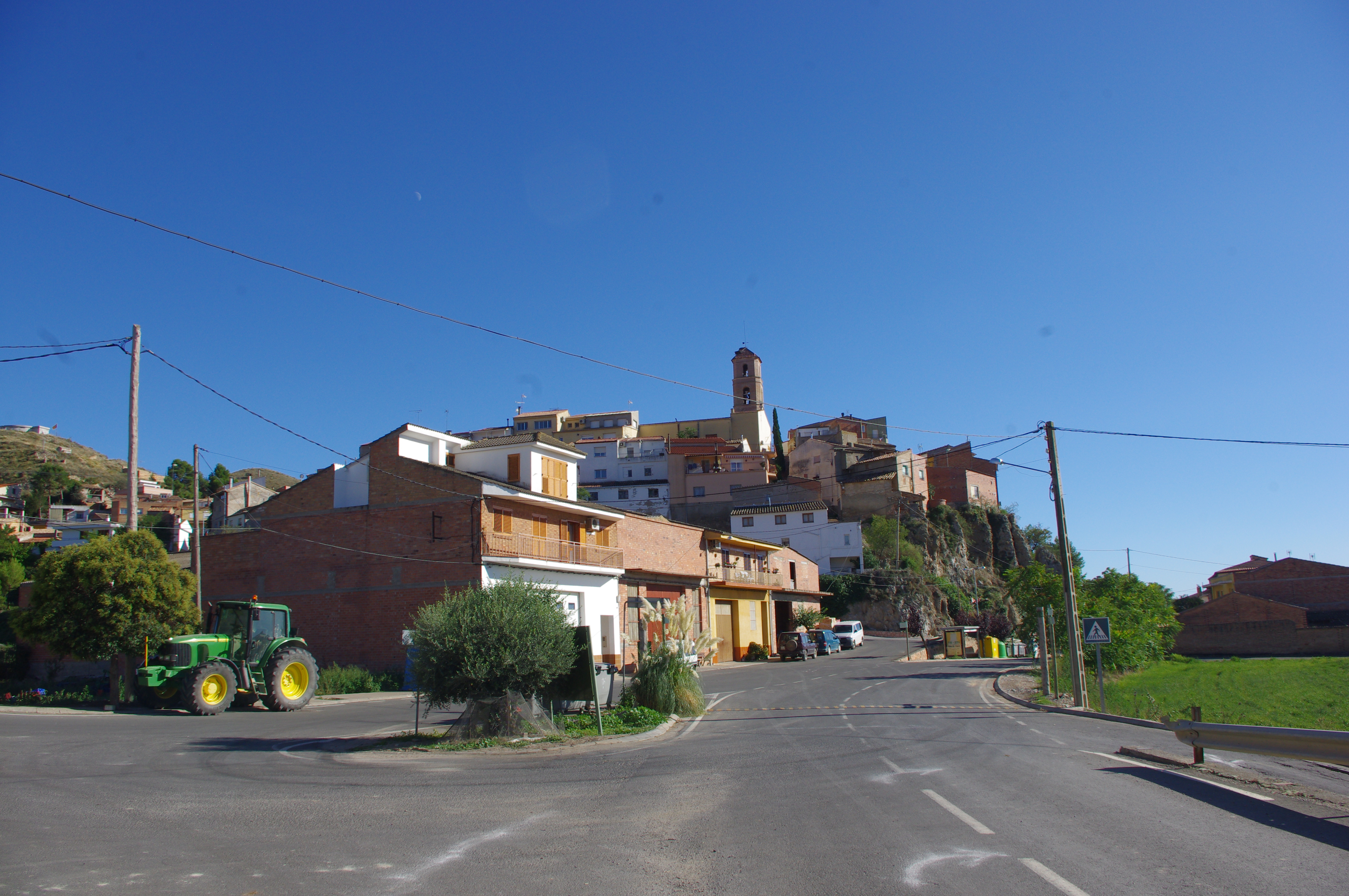

- Flag Coat of arms

- Location in the Province of Lleida Location in Catalonia Location in Spain
- Coordinates: 41.850°N 0.586°E
- Country: Spain
- Community: Catalonia
- Province: Lleida
- Comarca: Noguera

Government
  - Mayor: Josep Magrí Mangues (2015)

Area
  - Total: 27.1 km^{2} (10.5 sq mi)
- Elevation: 314 m (1,030 ft)

Population (2025-01-01)
  - Total: 317
  - Density: 11.7/km^{2} (30.3/sq mi)
- Demonym(s): Ivarset, ivarseta
- Website: www.ccnoguera.cat/ivars

Ivars de Noguera (Catalan pronunciation: [iˈβaɾz ðe noˈɣeɾa]) is a municipality in the comarca of the Noguera in Catalonia, Spain. It is situated on the left bank of the Noguera Ribagorçana river below the Santa Anna reservoir. The village is served by the L-903 road, which joins the C-148 road to Balaguer.

== Demography ==
It has a population of 317 (register office, 2025).

1900	1930	1950	1970	1986	2007
477	471	415	393	365	340
