= La Sentiu de Sió =

- Municipality
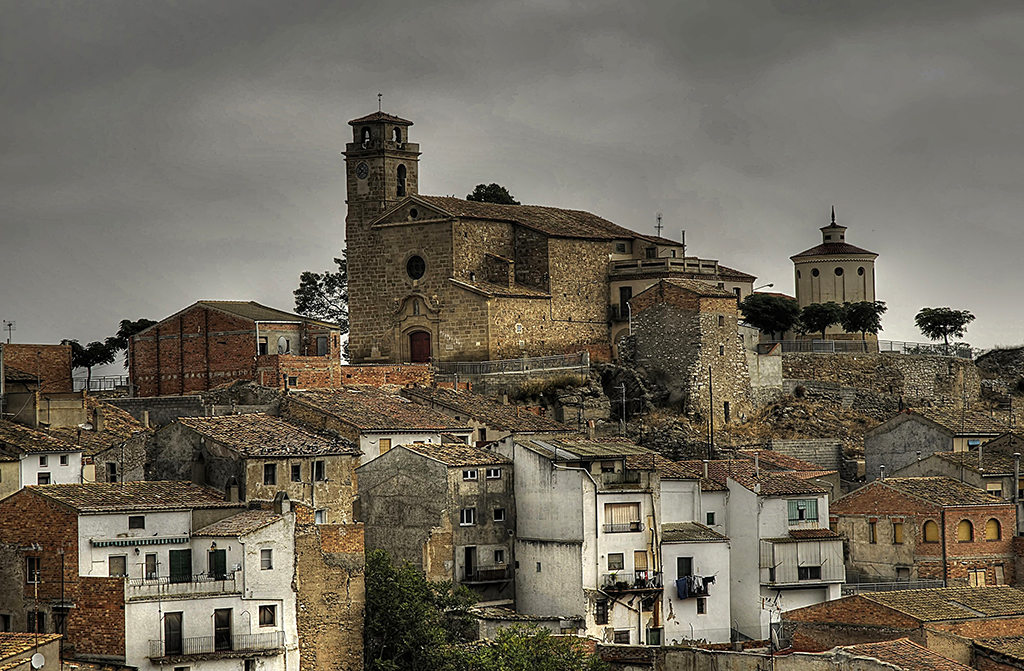

- Flag Coat of arms

- Location in Catalonia
- Coordinates: 41°48′23″N 0°52′48″E
- Country: Spain
- Community: Catalonia
- Province: Lleida
- Comarca: La Noguera

Government
  - Mayor: Antonio López Trabalón (2015)

Area
  - Total: 29.6 km^{2} (11.4 sq mi)
- Elevation: 281 m (922 ft)

Population (2025-01-01)
  - Total: 448
  - Density: 15.1/km^{2} (39.2/sq mi)
- Postal code: 25617
- Website: sentiu.cat

La Sentiu de Sió (Catalan pronunciation: [la senˈtiw ðe siˈo]) is a municipality in the comarca of Noguera, in the province of Lleida, Catalonia, Spain. It has a population of 448 (register office, 2025).
