= Cubells =

- Municipality
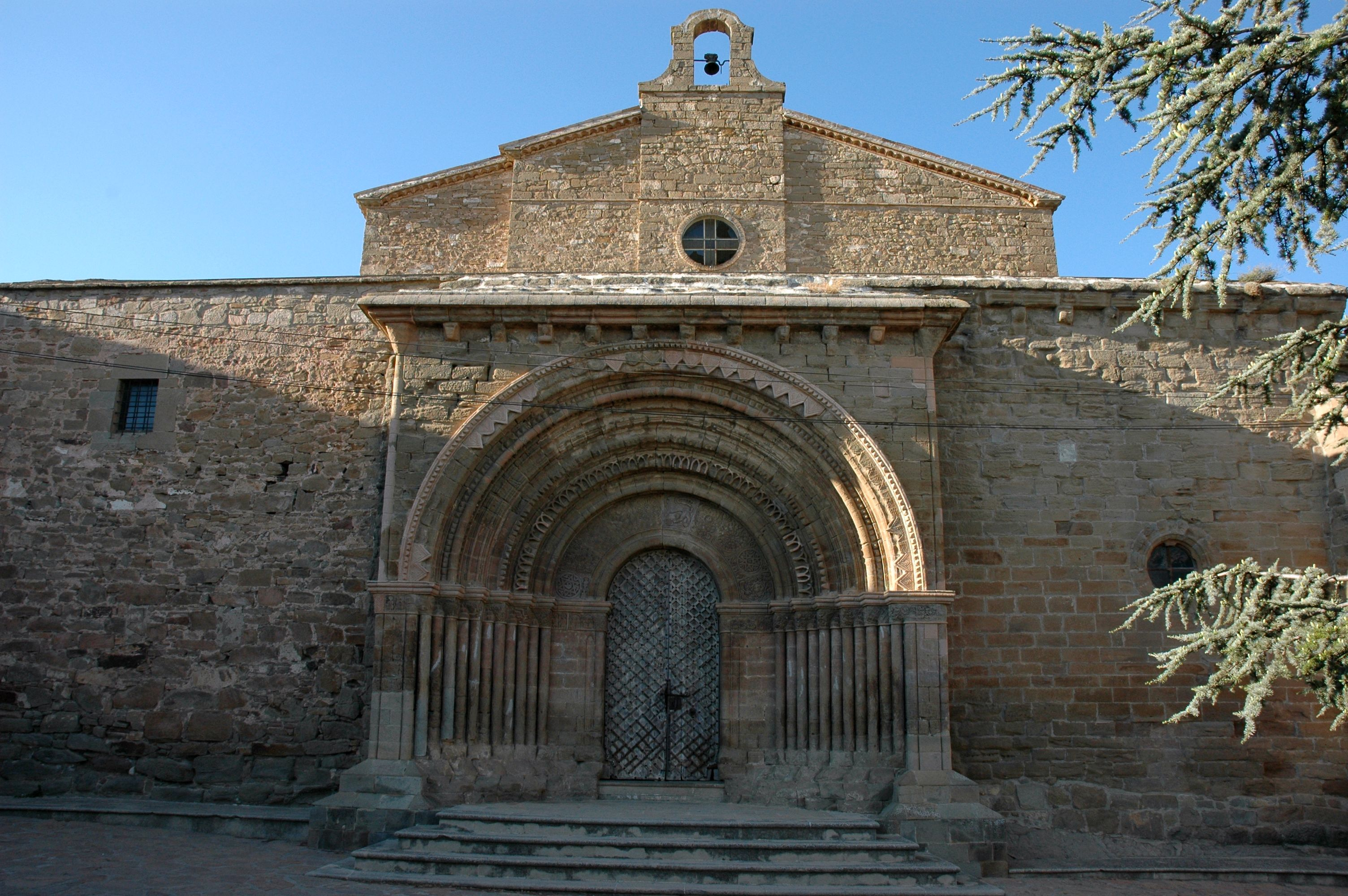
- Cubells castle, Santa Maria church

- Location in Catalonia
- Coordinates: 41°51′13″N 0°57′35″E
- Country: Spain
- Community: Catalonia
- Province: Lleida
- Comarca: Noguera

Government
  - Mayor: Josep Regué Montserrat (2015)

Area
  - Total: 39.2 km^{2} (15.1 sq mi)

Population (2025-01-01)
  - Total: 354
  - Density: 9.03/km^{2} (23.4/sq mi)
- Website: www.ccnoguera.cat/cubells

Cubells (Catalan pronunciation: [kuˈβeʎs]) is a village in the province of Lleida and autonomous community of Catalonia, Spain. It has a population of 354 (register office, 2025).
