= Ponts, Spain =

Ponts
- Municipality
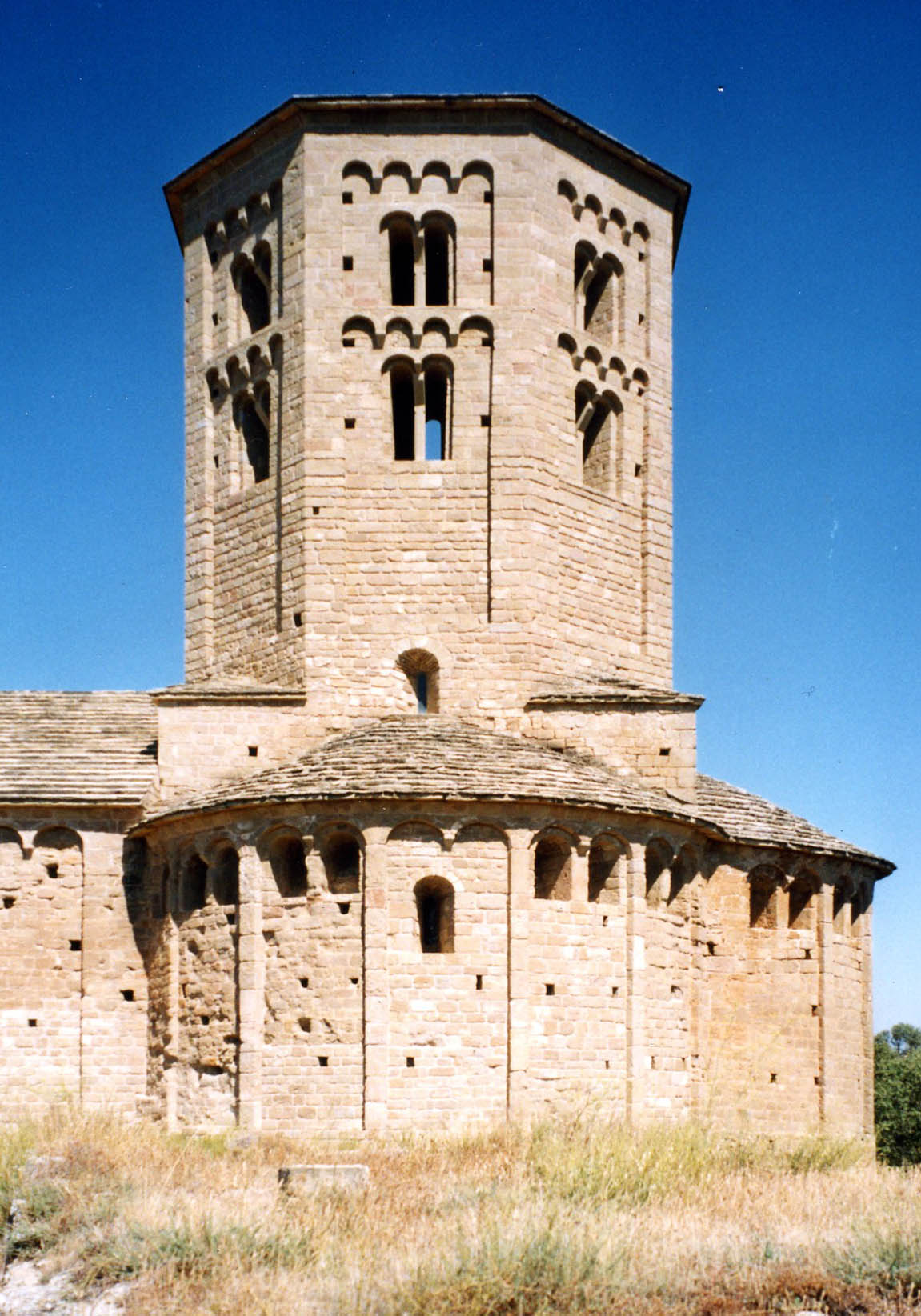
- Romanesque art in Sant Pere Church in Ponts

- Location in Catalonia
- Coordinates: 41°54′53.28″N 1°11′6.00″E
- Country: Spain
- Autonomous Community: Catalonia
- Province: Lleida
- Comarca: Noguera

Government
  - Mayor: Francisco Garcia Cañadas (2015)

Area
  - Total: 30.5 km^{2} (11.8 sq mi)
- Elevation: 363 m (1,191 ft)

Population (2025-01-01)
  - Total: 2,653
  - Density: 87.0/km^{2} (225/sq mi)
- Demonym: Pontsicans
- Postal code: 25740
- Website: www.ccnoguera.cat/ponts

Ponts (Catalan pronunciation: [ˈpɔns]) is a municipality and a town in the comarca of the Noguera in the province of Lleida, Catalonia, Spain. It is situated on the left bank of the Segre river near its confluence with the Llobregós river and at the point where the routes from Calaf (currently the C-1412 road) and Cervera (currently the L-313 road) meet the route from Lleida to La Seu d'Urgell (currently the C-1313 road).

It has a population of 2,653 (register office, 2025).

Economy is based on agriculture (cereals, olives, vine, potato, sunflowers) and animal husbandry (domestic sheep, pigs, birds). The industry sector comprises food processing and textiles.

== Main sights ==
- Sant Pere de Ponts, a Romanesque church built in the 11th century.
- Old quarter of Ponts. With the typical portico of the Major Street.
- Rialb reservoir. This is the biggest dam in Catalonia.
- Segarra-Garrigues Canal. It is the name of an important water line that supplies part of Lleida.
- Parc La Roca del Call. It is an outdoor multi-sports complex, especially canoeing and kayaking.
- Circuit del Bosquet (also known as Circuit de Ponts). It is one of the best motocross circuits in Catalonia.
- Boncompte Museum. It is a private collection of firearms.
