= Algerri =

- Municipality
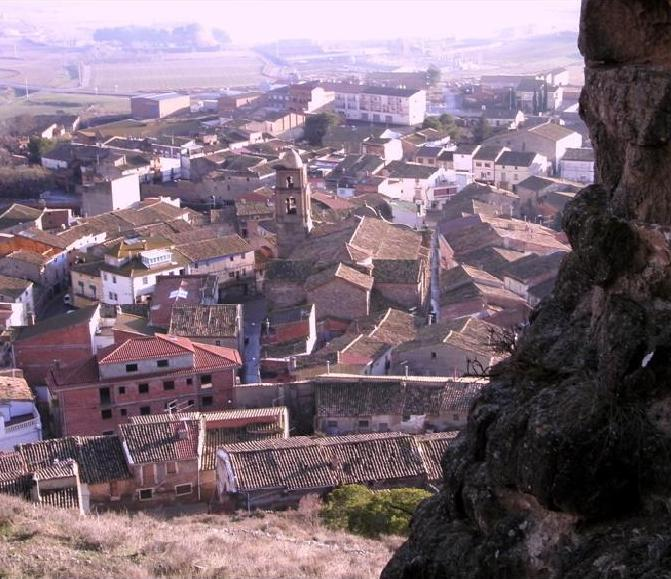
- View from the castle

- Coat of arms

- Location in Catalonia
- Coordinates: 41°49′3″N 0°38′22″E
- Country: Spain
- Community: Catalonia
- Province: Lleida
- Comarca: Noguera

Government
  - Mayor: Miquel Plensa Martínez (2015)

Area
  - Total: 54.3 km^{2} (21.0 sq mi)
- Elevation: 345 m (1,132 ft)

Population (2025-01-01)
  - Total: 424
  - Density: 7.81/km^{2} (20.2/sq mi)
- postal code: 25130
- Website: www.ccnoguera.cat/algerri

Algerri (Catalan pronunciation: [alˈdʒɛri]) is a municipality in the comarca of Noguera, in the province of Lleida, Catalonia, Spain. It has a population of 424 (register office, 2025).

Agriculture is a principal economy activity, dedicated mainly to dryland farming. Cultivation of cereals, olives, almonds and sheep husbandry are of importance.
