= Alòs de Balaguer =

- Municipality
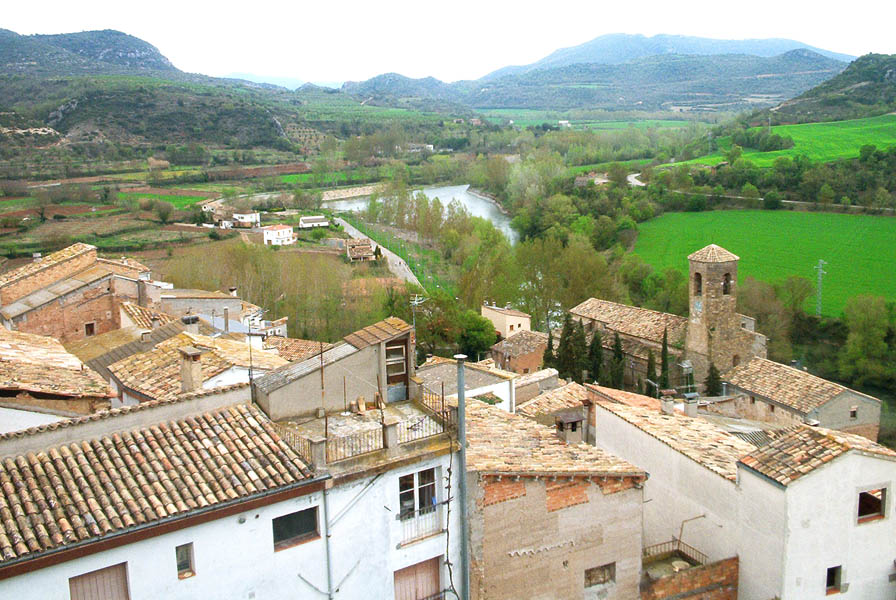

- Location in Catalonia
- Coordinates: 41°54′49″N 0°57′44″E
- Country: Spain
- Community: Catalonia
- Province: Lleida
- Comarca: La Noguera

Government
  - Mayor: Lluis Soldevila Cuadrat (2015)

Area
  - Total: 69.1 km^{2} (26.7 sq mi)
- Elevation: 297 m (974 ft)

Population (2025-01-01)
  - Total: 118
  - Density: 1.71/km^{2} (4.42/sq mi)
- Demonyms: Alosenc, alosenca
- Postal code: 25135
- Area code: +34
- Website: www.ccnoguera.cat/alosbalaguer

Alòs de Balaguer (Catalan pronunciation: [aˈlɔz ðe βalaˈɣe]) is a municipality in the comarca of Noguera, in the province of Lleida, Catalonia, Spain.

Alòs de Balaguer has a very scant population of 118 (register office, 2025). With such a small population, there is an average of 2.2 people per km^{2} and only 5.8 people per square mile. With only one vineyard, one restaurant and the Rio Segre river nearby. The Riu Segre is up to 50+ feet deep in some spots in the middle of the river. In Alos de Balaguer, in the Segre sector, the watercourse leaves the normal north–south direction from the South Pyrenean river and heads towards the towns and bridges of Camarasa. The river runs through, firstly, a sector composed of tertiary sediments. This comprises the northern margin of the Central Catalan Depression to be introduced later in the Pyrenees mountains. Outside through the narrow and deep gorge (Gorge wall) on the basis of Alos de Balaguer, it then goes back to the depression of the Ebro. From Ebro, it then stretches to Camarasa-Balaguer.
