= Penelles =

- Municipality
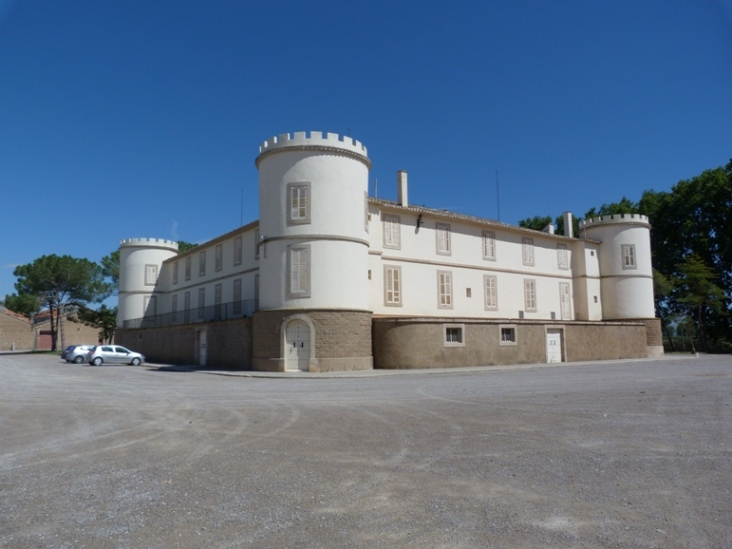
- Remei castle

- Flag Coat of arms

- Location in Catalonia
- Coordinates: 41°45′28″N 0°57′50″E
- Country: Spain
- Community: Catalonia
- Province: Lleida
- Comarca: Noguera

Government
  - Mayor: Eloi Bergós Farràs (2015)

Area
  - Total: 25.5 km^{2} (9.8 sq mi)

Population (2025-01-01)
  - Total: 431
  - Density: 16.9/km^{2} (43.8/sq mi)
- Website: penelles.cat

Penelles (Catalan pronunciation: [peˈneʎes]) is a village in the province of Lleida and autonomous community of Catalonia, Spain. It has a population of 431 (register office, 2025).
