= Menàrguens =

- Municipality
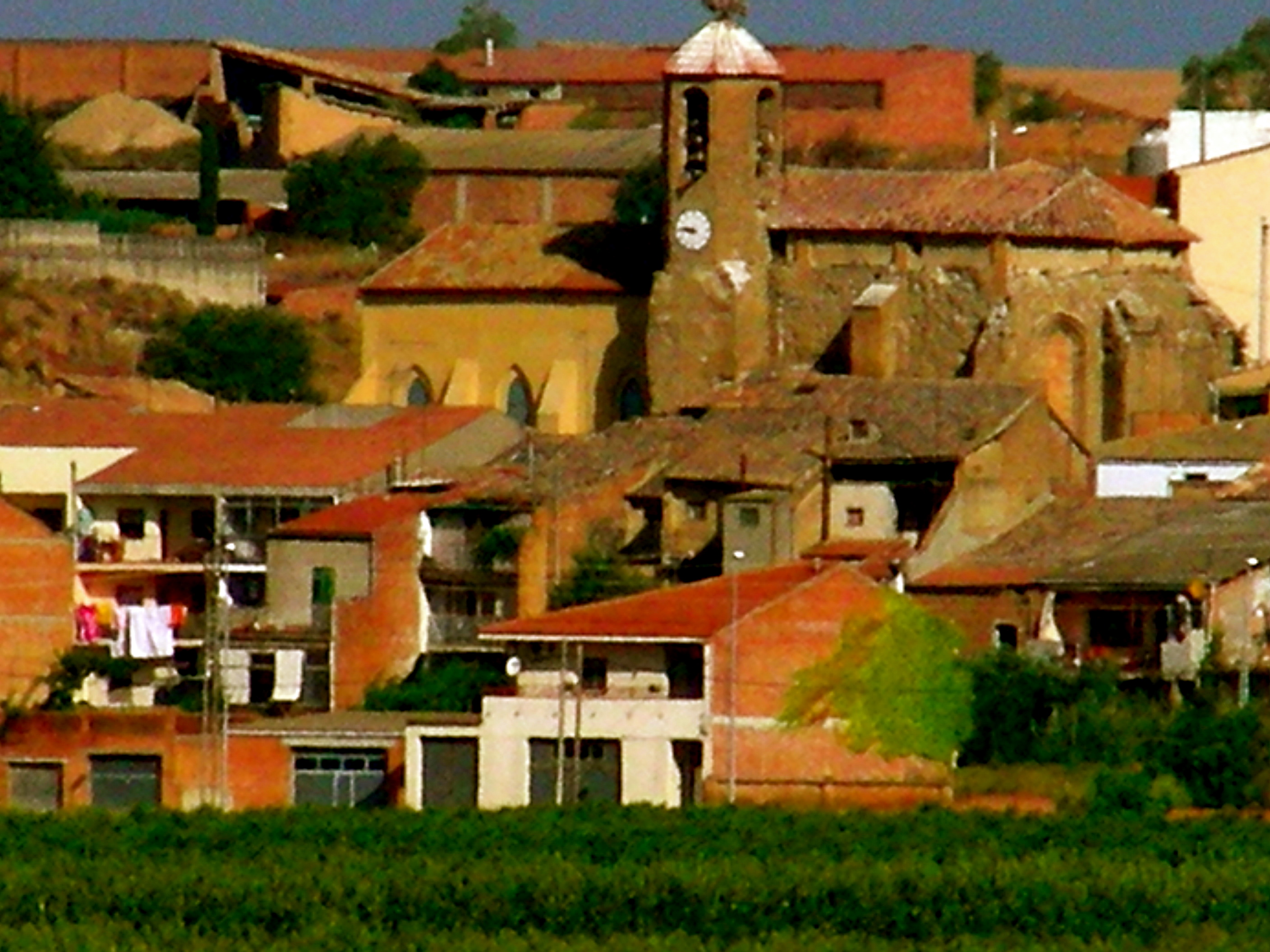

- Flag Coat of arms

- Location in Catalonia
- Coordinates: 41°43′55″N 0°44′43″E
- Country: Spain
- Community: Catalonia
- Province: Lleida
- Comarca: Noguera

Government
  - Mayor: Anna Maria Calvis Munsó (2015)

Area
  - Total: 20.2 km^{2} (7.8 sq mi)
- Elevation: 205 m (673 ft)

Population (2025-01-01)
  - Total: 798
  - Density: 39.5/km^{2} (102/sq mi)
- Demonym: Menarguí
- Postal code: 25139
- Website: www.ccnoguera.cat/menarguens

Menàrguens (Catalan pronunciation: [meˈnaɾɣens]) is a municipality in the comarca of Noguera, in the province of Lleida, Catalonia, Spain.

It has a population of 798 (register office, 2025).
