= Portola, San Francisco =

Portola
- Neighborhood of San Francisco
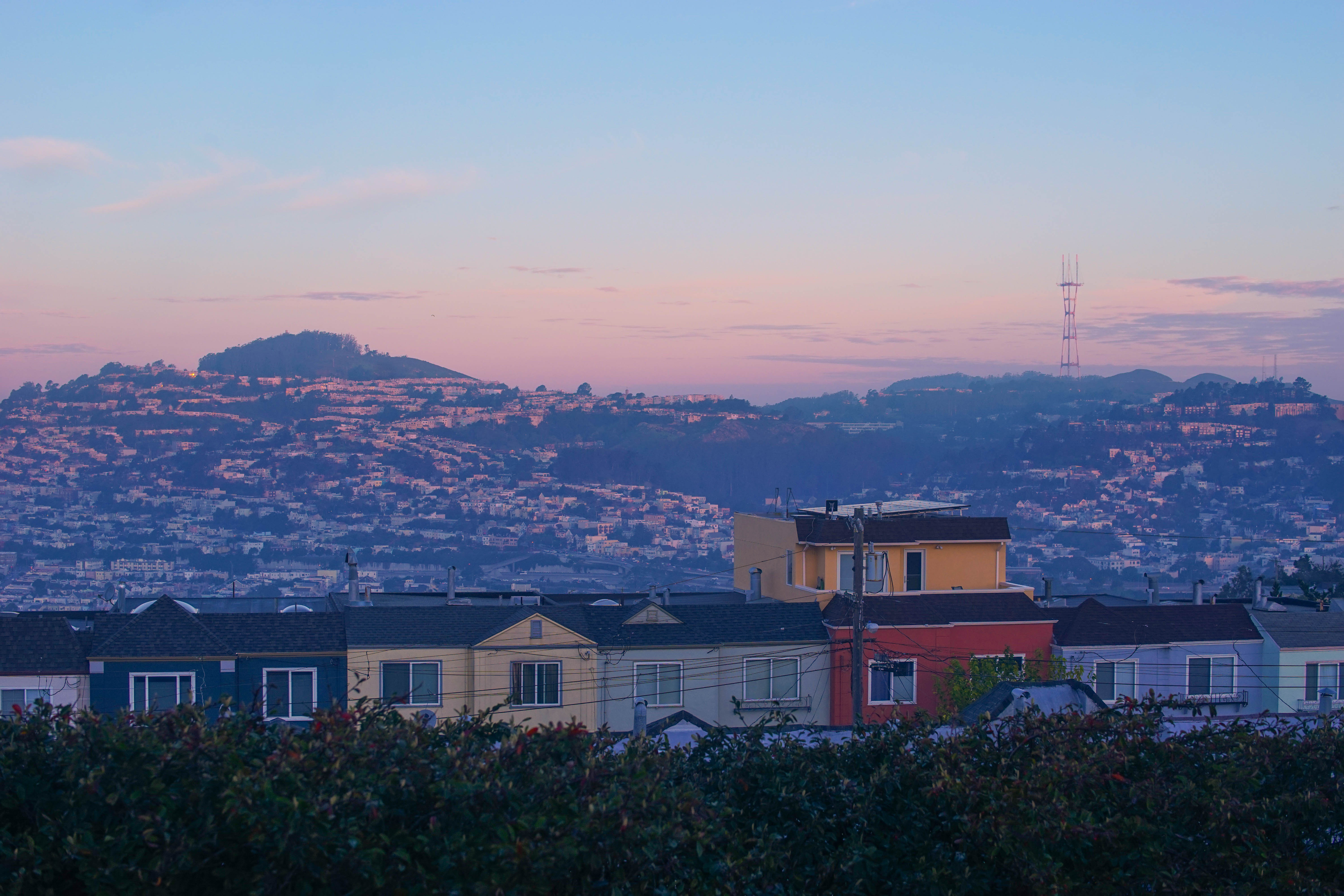
- Nickname: Garden District
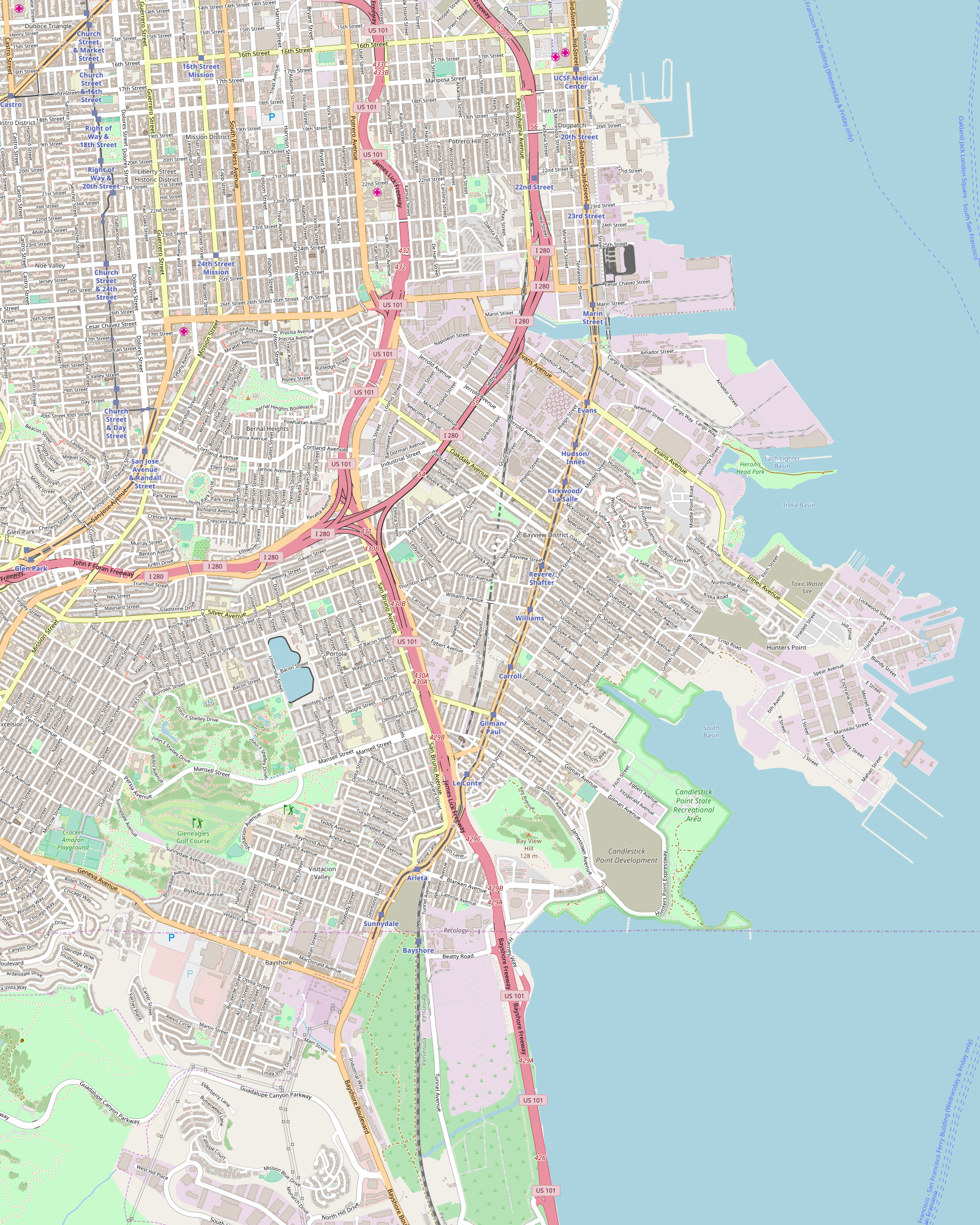
- Location within San Francisco Portola (San Francisco County) Portola (San Francisco Bay Area)
- Coordinates: 37.72740°N 122.40653°W
- State: California
- City: San Francisco

Government
  - Supervisor: Jackie Fielder
  - CA Assembly: Matt Haney (D)
  - State Senator: Scott Wiener (D)
  - U.S. Rep.: Kevin Mullin (D)

Area
  - Total: 1.582 sq mi (4.10 km^{2})

Population (2022)
  - Total: 16,410
  - Density: 16,500/sq mi (6,400/km^{2})
- Time zone: UTC-8 (PST)
  - Summer (DST): UTC-7 (PDT)
- ZIP Code: 94134
- Area codes: 415/628

Portola (Por-to-la, also known as Portola District) is a neighborhood located in the southeastern quadrant of San Francisco, California.

Portola is a neighborhood in the southeastern part of San Francisco, northeast of McLaren Park. It is roughly bordered by San Bruno Avenue and the James Lick Freeway (U.S. Route 101) to the east, Mansell Street to the south, University Street to the west and the Southern Freeway (Interstate 280) to the north. The adjacent Portola Heights extension lies west uphill from University Street to the Excelsior District, bordering McLaren Park to the south.

== Name ==
Portola (pronounced PORE-toe-luh, by denizens) was named after the old Portola School, which in turn was named after the Spanish explorer Gaspar de Portolà (credited by some as the discoverer of San Francisco Bay).

It earned the nickname Garden District for its history of urban farming dating back to the early 1900s. The neighborhood once had over 20 functioning commercial farms and greenhouses.

== Characteristics ==
Portola is a quiet residential neighborhood with low-slung single family homes popular with growing or established families. Housing prices is on the rise driven by the popularity of homes with a yard in an urban city where dwellings often lack such amenities. The local residents have plans to resurrect the neighborhood's heritage as a garden district.

According to the U.S. Census, the Asian population in the Portola has been steadily increasing since the 1990s. The Portola is marked by Census Tract 257.

== History ==
Originally settled after the 1906 earthquake by Jewish and Italian immigrants, the area evolved into a community populated by nurserymen and their families who grew much of the city's flower crop there and uphill to the west in the Portola Heights extension. "The Road", as San Bruno Avenue was affectionately referred to by the locals, still hosts businesses that include bakeries, grocery stores, pharmacies, and in earlier times the Avenue Theater, now a church. The Portola was also once home to a significant population of Maltese immigrants and settlers and at one time the Maltese Consulate.

== Demographics ==
According to the 2020 census data gathered by the San Francisco Planning Dept.

Population
| Total Population | 16,243 |
| 2010 to 2020 Population Growth | 10.7% |

Income
| Median Household Income | $104,452 |
| 2010-20 Income Growth | 52.7% |

Housing
| Median Home Value | $959,000 |
| Median Rent Value | $1,861 |

Race/Ethnicity
| Asian | 54% |
| Latino (of any race) | 26% |
| Not listed/Multi-racial | 23% |
| White | 18% |
| African American | 4% |
| American Indian | 1% |

Households
| Family Households | 72% |
| Households with 60 years and older | 51% |
| Households with Children | 27% |
| Non-Family Households | 22% |
| Single Person Households | 20% |
| Single Senior (65+) Households | 8% |
| Avg. Household Size | 3.3 |
| Avg. Family Household Size | 3.9 |

Educational Attainment (Residents 25 years and older)
| Less than high school degree | 23% |
| High school degree or equivalent | 21% |
| Some College/Associate Degree | 28% |
| Bachelor degree or higher | 28% |

== Education ==
=== Elementary ===
- E.R. Taylor Elementary School

=== High school ===
- Philip and Sala Burton Academic School

== Gallery ==
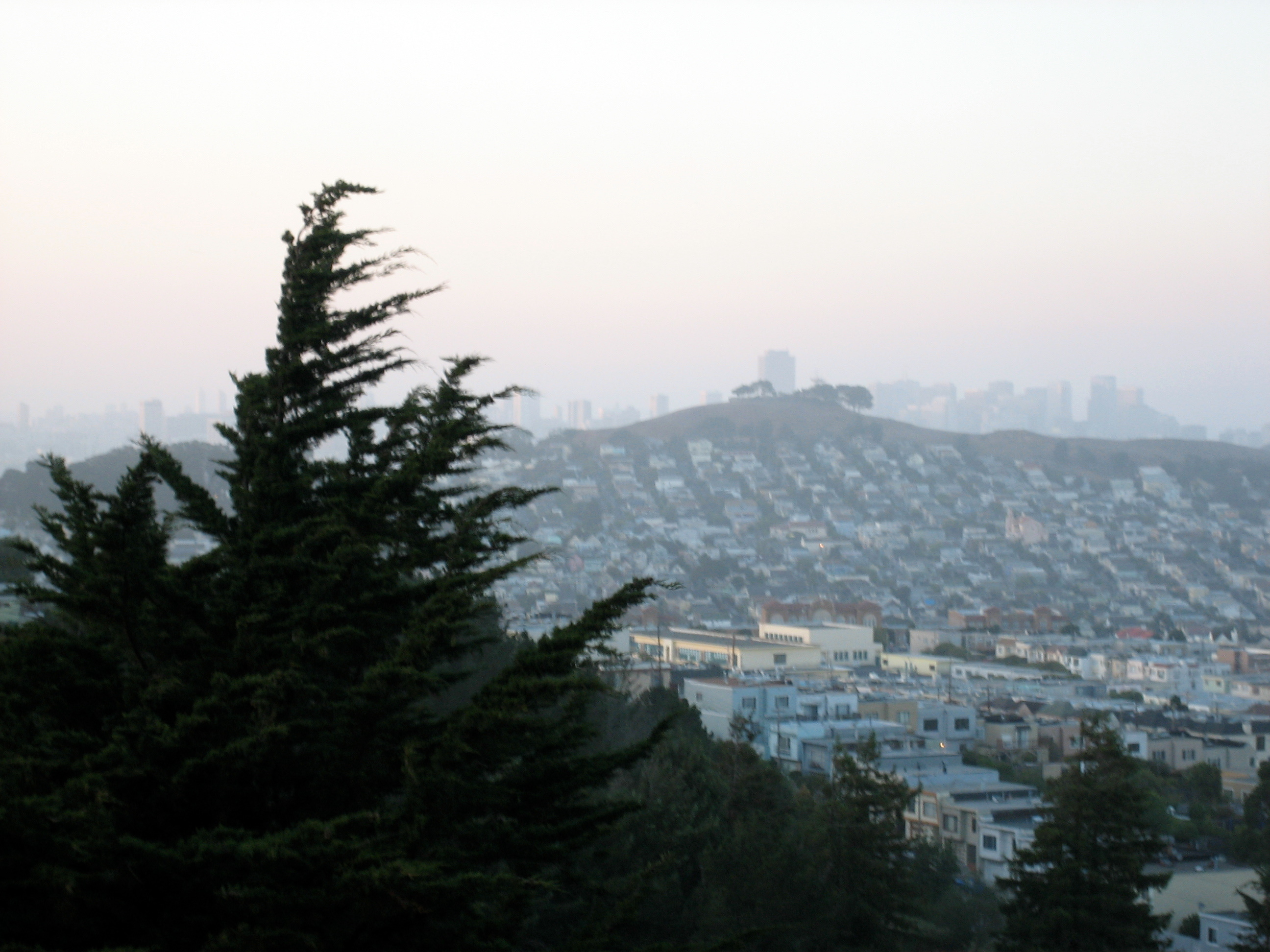
Portola viewed from John McLaren Park
