= Cabanabona =

- Municipality
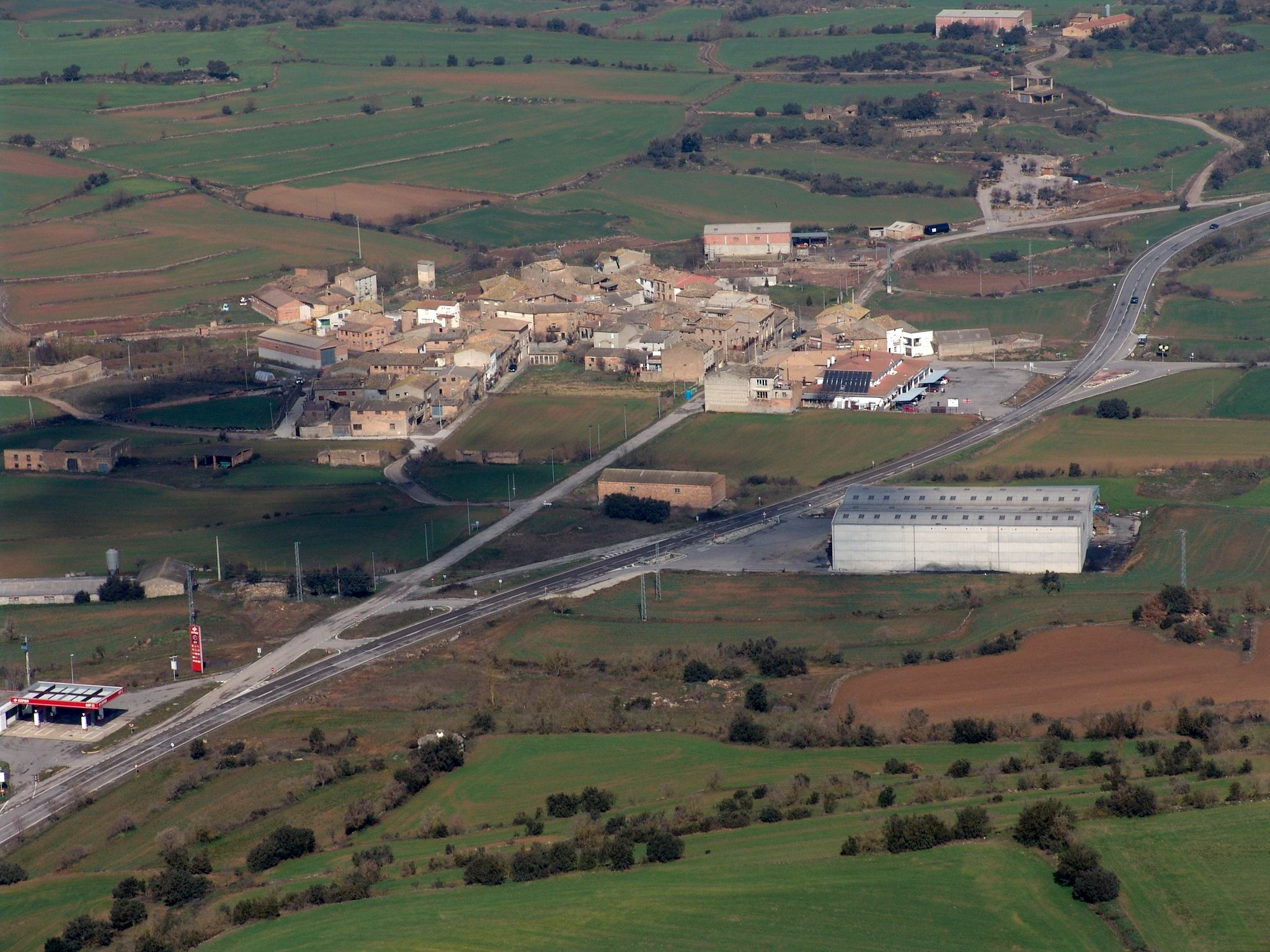
- Cabanabona

- Flag Coat of arms

- Location in Catalonia
- Coordinates: 41°51′9″N 1°12′58″E
- Country: Spain
- Community: Catalonia
- Province: Lleida
- Comarca: Noguera

Government
  - Mayor: Lluís Clotet Oliva (2015)

Area
  - Total: 14.2 km^{2} (5.5 sq mi)

Population (2025-01-01)
  - Total: 70
  - Density: 4.9/km^{2} (13/sq mi)
- Website: www.ccnoguera.cat/cabanabona

Cabanabona (Catalan pronunciation: [kaˌβanaˈβɔna]) is a village in the province of Lleida and autonomous community of Catalonia, Spain. It has a population of 70 (register office, 2025). It has a population of 70 (register office, 2025).
