= Tiurana =

- Municipality
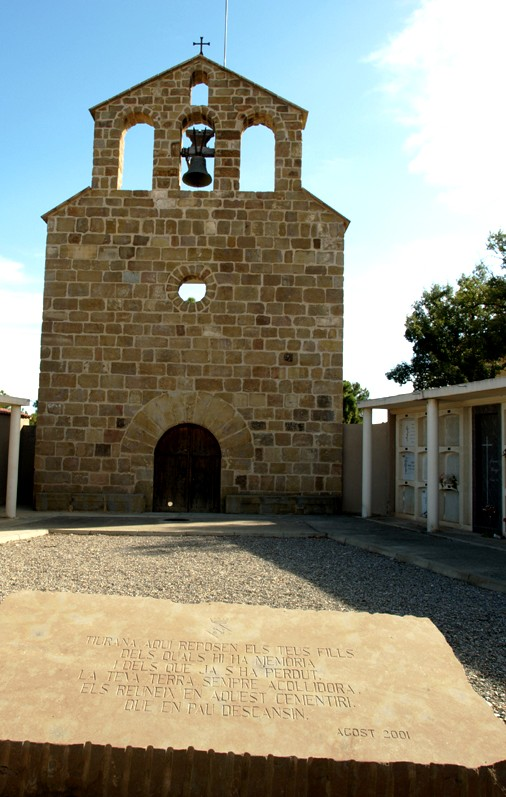
- St. Peter's church, Tiurana

- Flag Coat of arms

- Location in Catalonia
- Coordinates: 41°58′40″N 1°15′21″E
- Country: Spain
- Community: Catalonia
- Province: Lleida
- Comarca: Noguera

Government
  - Mayor: Àngel Villarte Canes (2015) (PSC)

Area
  - Total: 15.9 km^{2} (6.1 sq mi)
- Elevation: 633 m (2,077 ft)

Population (2025-01-01)
  - Total: 69
  - Density: 4.3/km^{2} (11/sq mi)
- Demonym: Tiuranenc
- Postal code: 25791
- Website: www.ccnoguera.cat/tiurana

Tiurana (Catalan pronunciation: [tiwˈɾana]) is a municipality in the comarca of Noguera, in the province of Lleida, Catalonia, Spain. It has a population of 69 (register office, 2025).

It is home to a late-Gothic parish church, built in 1545. Outside the hamlet is a Romanesque hermitage dedicate to St. Ermengol.

The economy is based on agriculture (wheat, potatoes, alfalfa, and vegetables).
