= Vilanova de l'Aguda =

- Municipality
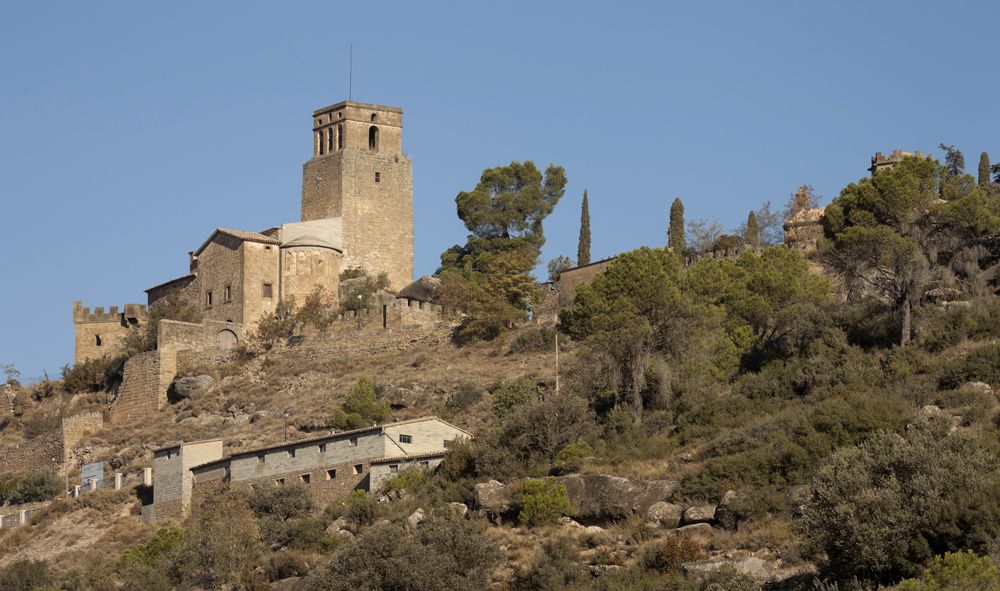
- Ribelles castle

- Coat of arms

- Location in Catalonia
- Coordinates: 41°54′47″N 1°15′14″E
- Country: Spain
- Community: Catalonia
- Province: Lleida
- Comarca: Noguera

Government
  - Mayor: Montserrat Fornells Solé (2015)

Area
  - Total: 53.7 km^{2} (20.7 sq mi)
- Elevation: 409 m (1,342 ft)

Population (2025-01-01)
  - Total: 192
  - Density: 3.58/km^{2} (9.26/sq mi)
- Postal code: Montserrat Fornells Solé
- Website: www.ccnoguera.cat/vilanovadelaguda

Vilanova de l'Aguda (Catalan pronunciation: [ˌbilaˈnɔβa ðe laˈɣuða]) is a municipality in the comarca of Noguera, in the province of Lleida, Catalonia, Spain.

It has a population of 192 (register office, 2025).
