= Oliola =

- Municipality
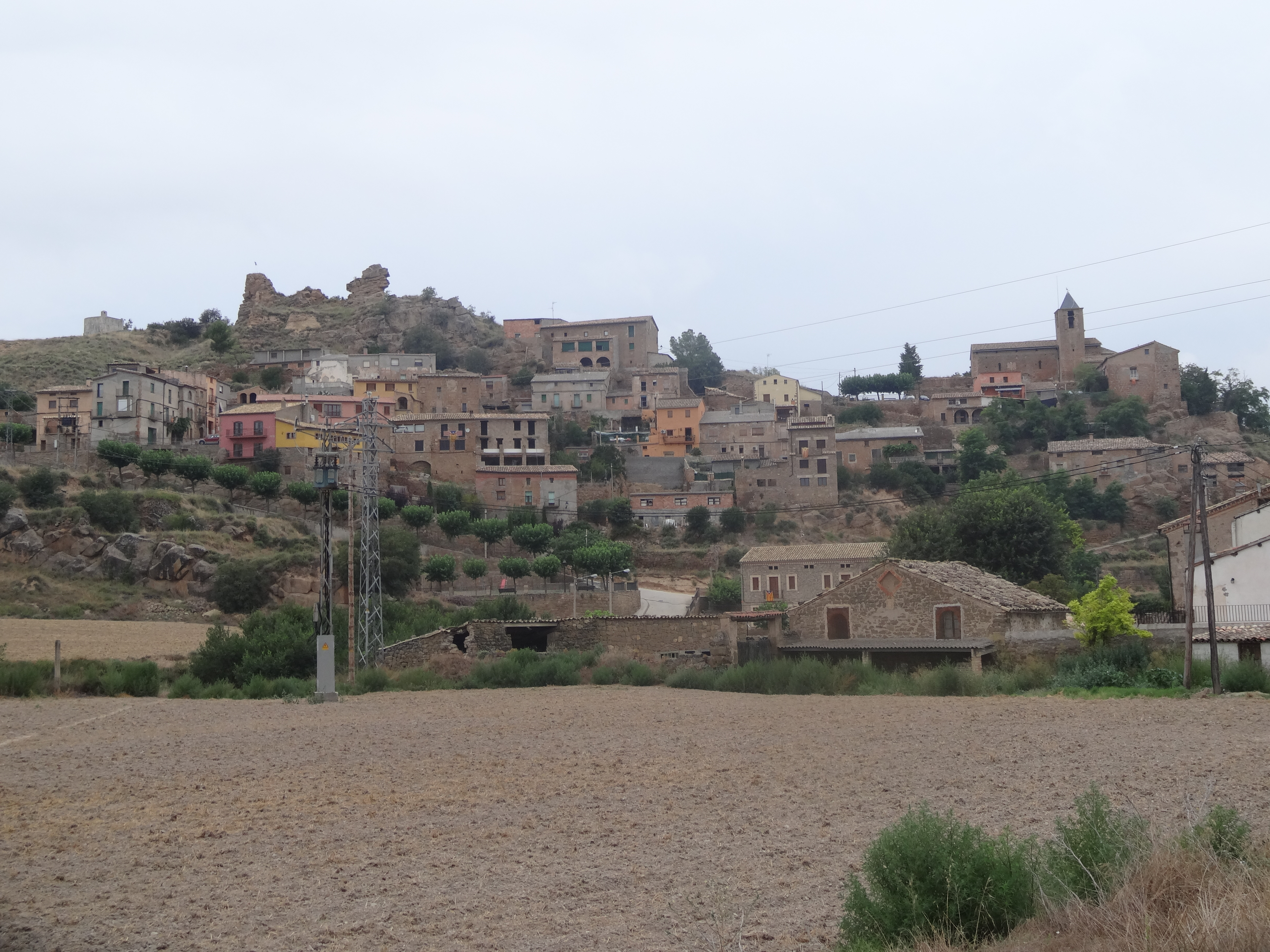
- Oliola

- Flag Coat of arms

- Location in Catalonia
- Coordinates: 41°52′39″N 1°10′33″E
- Country: Spain
- Community: Catalonia
- Province: Lleida
- Comarca: Noguera

Government
  - Mayor: Santiago Cisquella Finestres (2015)

Area
  - Total: 86.3 km^{2} (33.3 sq mi)

Population (2025-01-01)
  - Total: 192
  - Density: 2.22/km^{2} (5.76/sq mi)
- Website: www.ccnoguera.cat/oliola

Oliola (Catalan pronunciation: [oliˈɔla]) is a village in the province of Lleida and autonomous community of Catalonia, Spain. It has a population of 192 (register office, 2025).
