= Vilanova de Meià =

- Municipality
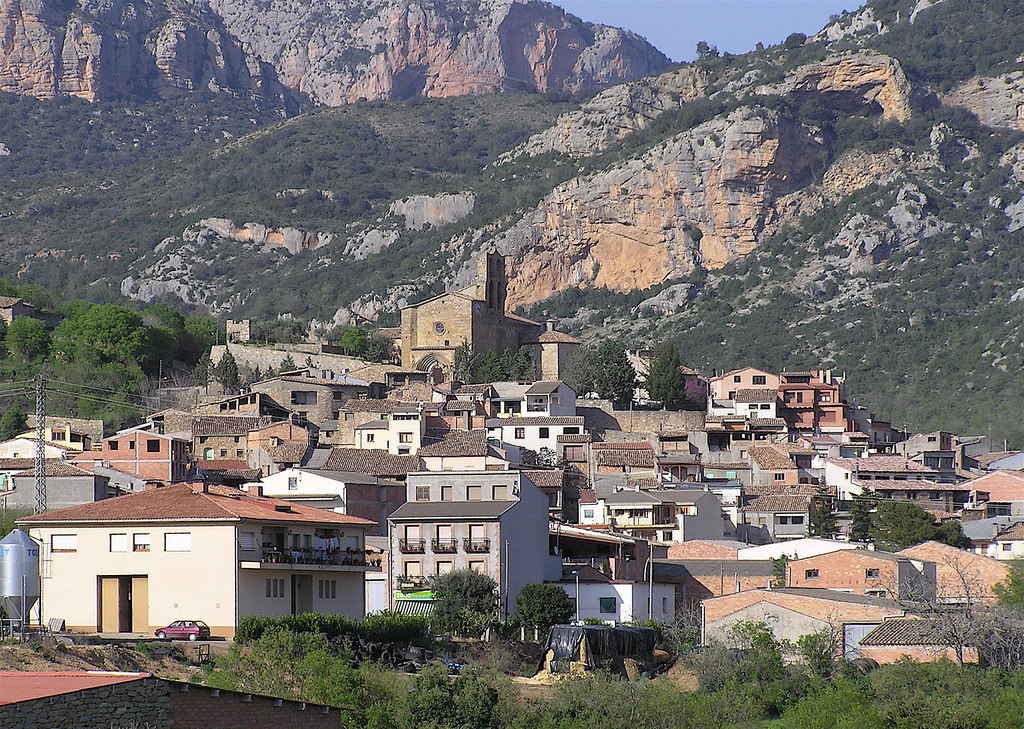
- Vilanova de Meià

- Location in Catalonia
- Coordinates: 41°59′45″N 1°1′25″E
- Country: Spain
- Community: Catalonia
- Province: Lleida
- Comarca: La Noguera

Government
  - Mayor: Xavier Terré Boliart (2015)

Area
  - Total: 105.2 km^{2} (40.6 sq mi)
- Elevation: 633 m (2,077 ft)

Population (2025-01-01)
  - Total: 479
  - Density: 4.55/km^{2} (11.8/sq mi)
- Postal code: 25735
- Website: www.ccnoguera.cat/vilanovademeia

Vilanova de Meià (Catalan pronunciation: [ˌbilaˈnɔβa ðe meˈja]) is a municipality in the comarca of Noguera, in the province of Lleida, Catalonia, Spain. It has a population of 479 (register office, 2025).
