= Foradada (surname) =

Foradada is a surname. Notable people with the surname include:

- Juan Antonio Bolea Foradada (1930–2021), Spanish politician
- Mercè Foradada (born 1947), Spanish writer and former Catalan teacher
