= Torrelameu =

- Municipality
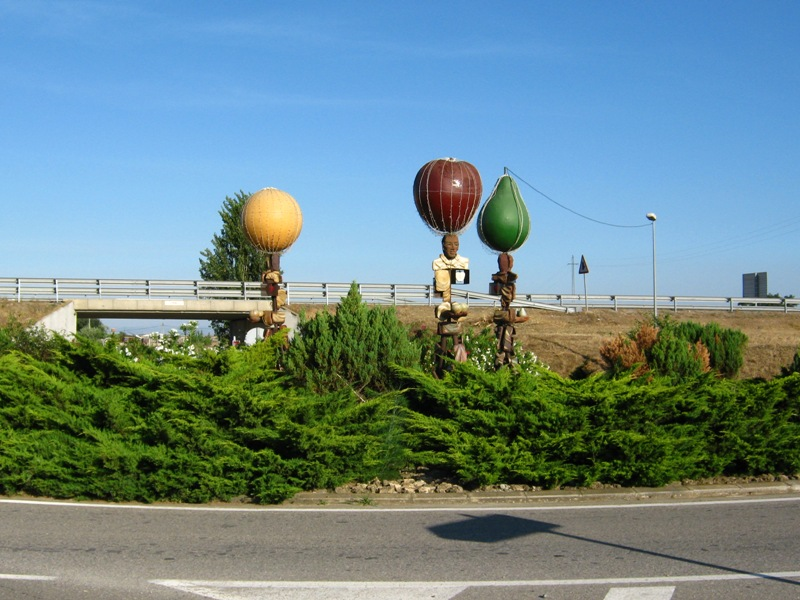
- Fruit Roundabout at village entrance

- Flag Coat of arms

- Location in Catalonia
- Coordinates: 41°42′24″N 0°42′11″E
- Country: Spain
- Community: Catalonia
- Province: Lleida
- Comarca: Noguera

Government
  - Mayor: Carles Comes Marco (2015)

Area
  - Total: 10.9 km^{2} (4.2 sq mi)
- Elevation: 201 m (659 ft)

Population (2025-01-01)
  - Total: 788
  - Density: 72.3/km^{2} (187/sq mi)
- Postal code: 25138
- Website: www.ccnoguera.cat/torrelameu

Torrelameu (Catalan pronunciation: [torelaˈmɛw]) is a municipality in the comarca of Noguera, in the province of Lleida, Catalonia, Spain. It has a population of 788 (register office, 2025).

Economy is based on agriculture (cereals, wheat, maize, potatoes, vegetables, alfalfa, vines and others) and animal husbandry.
