= Preixens =

- Municipality
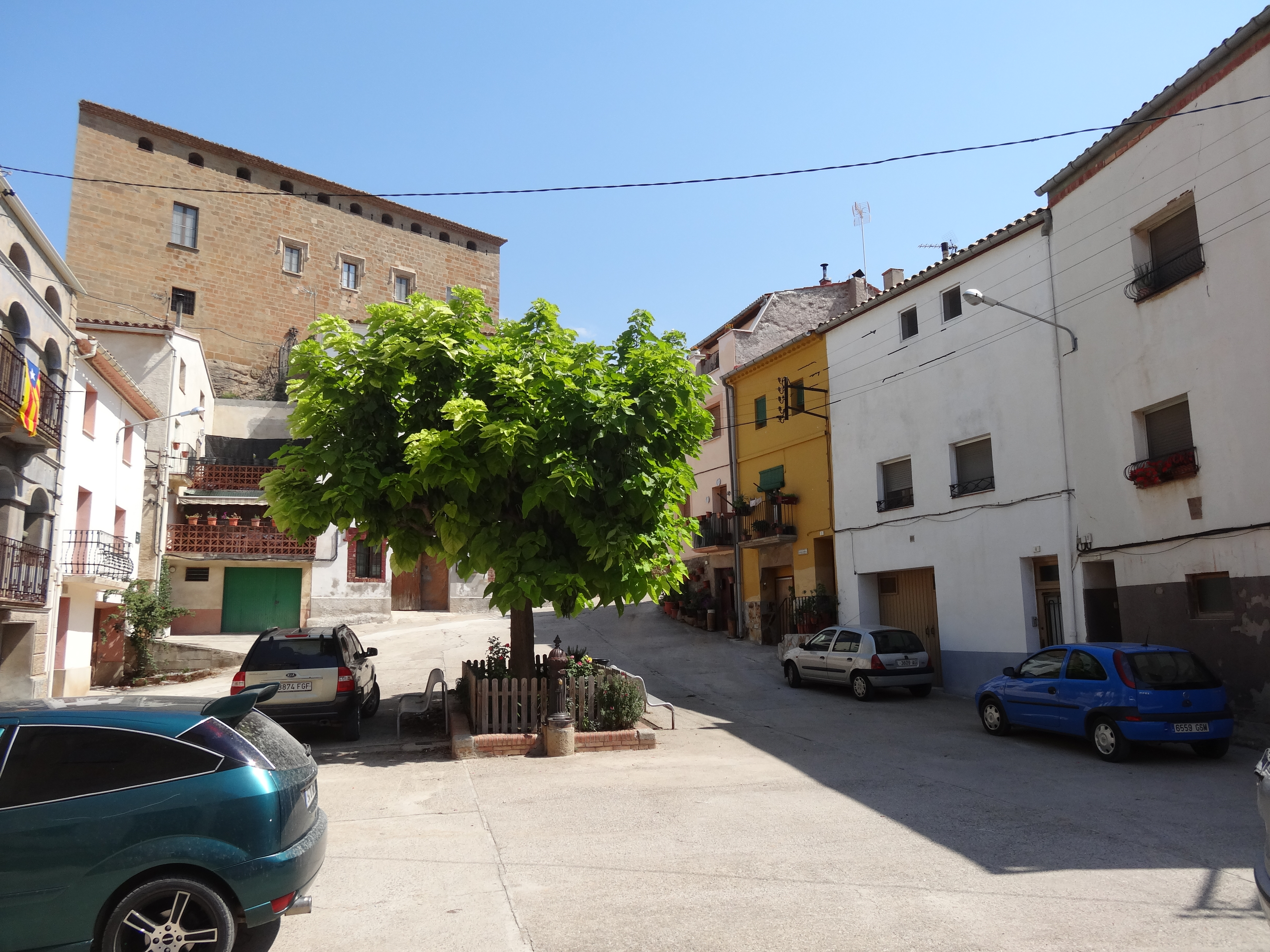
- Centre of Preixens

- Coat of arms

- Location in Catalonia
- Coordinates: 41°47′45″N 1°3′7″E
- Country: Spain
- Community: Catalonia
- Province: Lleida
- Comarca: Noguera

Government
  - Mayor: Joan Eroles Viles (2015)

Area
  - Total: 28.7 km^{2} (11.1 sq mi)
- Elevation: 315 m (1,033 ft)

Population (2025-01-01)
  - Total: 399
  - Density: 13.9/km^{2} (36.0/sq mi)
- Demonym: Preixenaires
- Postal code: 25316
- Website: www.ccnoguera.cat/preixens

Preixens (Catalan pronunciation: [pɾejˈʃɛns]) is a municipality in the comarca of Noguera, in the province of Lleida, Catalonia, Spain. It has a population of 399 (register office, 2025).
