= Urgel =

Urgel may refer to:

- Urgel (Madrid Metro), a station on Line 5
- Urgell, a comarca in Catalonia, Spain
- Urgell (Barcelona Metro), a station on Line 1
