= Os de Balaguer =

- Municipality
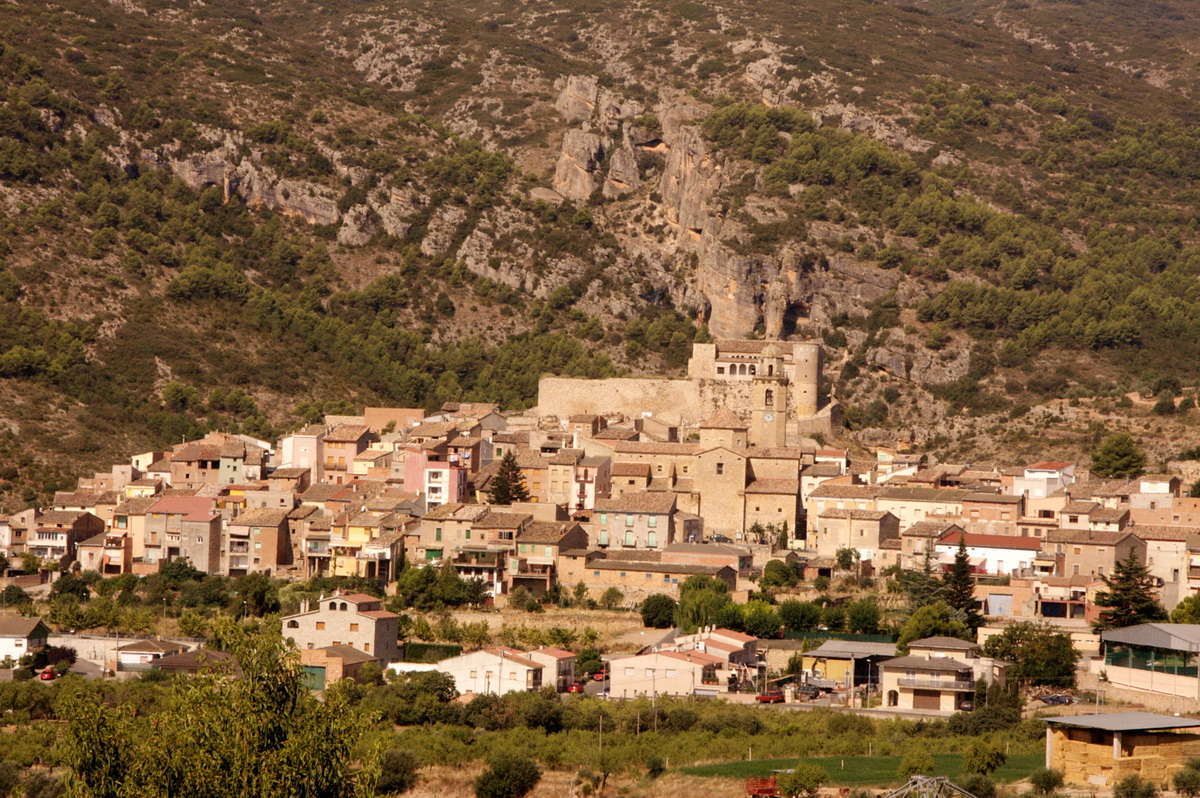
- Os de Balaguer

- Coat of arms

- Location in Province of Lleida Location in Catalonia Location in Spain
- Coordinates: 41°52′21″N 0°43′12″E
- Country: Spain
- Community: Catalonia
- Province: Lleida
- Comarca: Noguera

Government
  - Mayor: Estefania Rufach Fontova (2015)

Area
  - Total: 136.0 km^{2} (52.5 sq mi)
- Elevation: 463 m (1,519 ft)

Population (2025-01-01)
  - Total: 1,088
  - Density: 8.000/km^{2} (20.72/sq mi)
- Postal code: 25610
- Website: www.ccnoguera.cat/osbalaguer

Os de Balaguer (Catalan pronunciation: [ˈɔz ðe βalaˈɣe]) is a municipality in the comarca of Noguera, in the province of Lleida, Catalonia, Spain. It has a population of 1,088 (register office, 2025).

Economy is based on agriculture, with, in particular, the cultivation of vegetables, cereals and olive, and on animal husbandry as well.

Sights in the municipality include the rock paintings of Balma dels Vilars (included in the UNESCO World Heritage List and the former Augustianian monastery of Santa Maria de Bellpuig de les Avellanes.

Os de Balaguer was the birthplace of Gaspar de Portolá (1716–1784), governor of Baja and Alta California (1767–1770), explorer and founder of San Diego and Monterey.

The municipality is split into two parts, the bigger north-western part containing the village of Os de Balaguer, the smaller south-eastern part containing the village of Gerb.
