= Castelló de Farfanya =

- Municipality
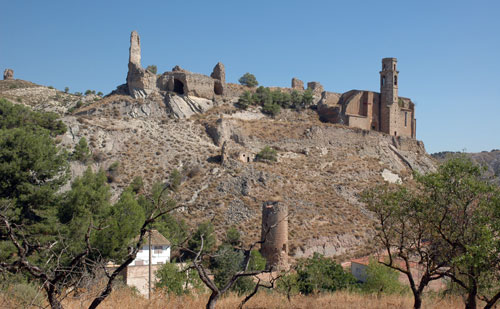
- The remains of the castle.

- Coat of arms

- Location in Catalonia
- Coordinates: 41°49′16″N 0°43′45″E
- Country: Spain
- Community: Catalonia
- Province: Lleida
- Comarca: Noguera

Government
  - Mayor: Omar Noumri i Coca

Area
  - Total: 52.6 km^{2} (20.3 sq mi)
- Elevation: 358 m (1,175 ft)

Population (2025-01-01)
  - Total: 548
  - Density: 10.4/km^{2} (27.0/sq mi)
- Postal code: 25136
- Website: www.ccnoguera.cat/castellofarfanya

Castelló de Farfanya (Catalan pronunciation: [kasteˈʎo ðe faɾˈfaɲɛ]) is a municipality in the comarca of the Noguera in Catalonia, Spain. It has a population of 548 (register office, 2025).

== History ==
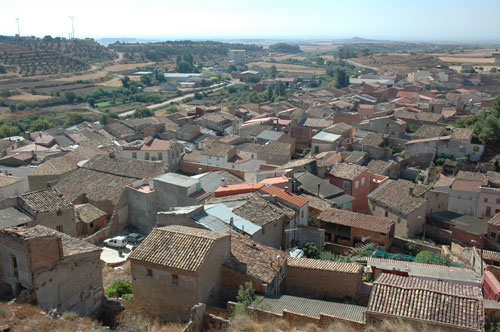
Overhead image of the village

Castelló de Farfanya is home to remains of a medieval castle owned by the Counts of Urgell. In 2023, the city council of the municipality announced it would be seeking funding for the restoration of the castle.

In 2018, the municipal government ordered the removal of a local monument commemorating Julià Babia i Poble Lliure, a militant who was a member of the Movement for Defence of the Land (MDT). The order came following judicial decisions that concluded the monument glorified terrorism.

== Government ==
The current mayor of Castelló de Farfanya is Omar Noumri i Coca, a member of the Republican Left of Catalonia (ERC). First elected in 2019, he is the first mayor in Catalonia with a Muslim and Maghrebi background.
