= Vallfogona de Balaguer =

- Municipality
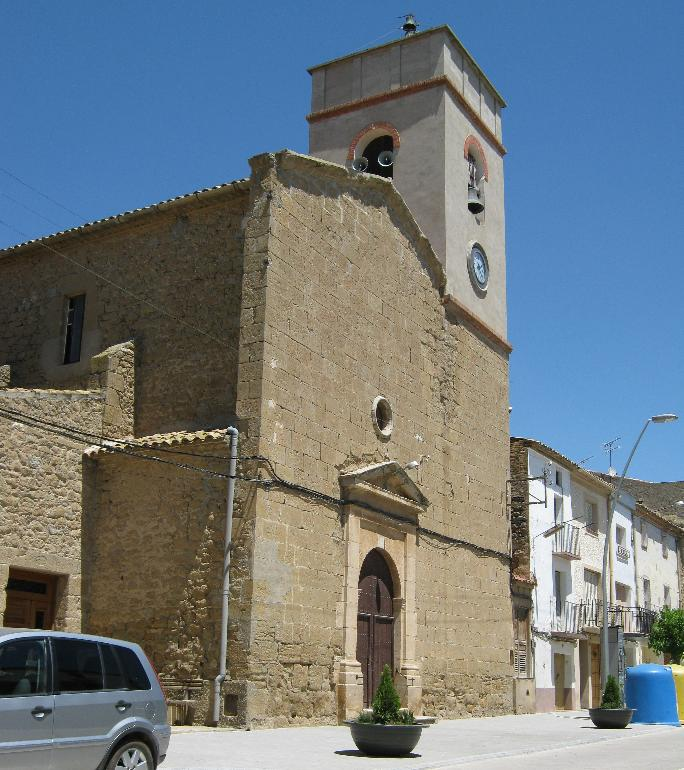
- Church of St. Michael Archangel

- Coat of arms

- Location in Catalonia
- Coordinates: 41.754°N 0.816°E
- Country: Spain
- Community: Catalonia
- Province: Lleida
- Comarca: La Noguera

Government
  - Mayor: Maria Sarret Pijuan (2015)

Area
  - Total: 27.0 km^{2} (10.4 sq mi)
- Elevation: 235 m (771 ft)

Population (2025-01-01)
  - Total: 2,009
  - Density: 74.4/km^{2} (193/sq mi)
- Postal code: 25680
- Website: www.vallfogona.net

Vallfogona de Balaguer (Catalan pronunciation: [ˌbaʎfoˈɣona ðe βalaˈɣe]) is a municipality in the comarca of Noguera, in the province of Lleida, Catalonia, Spain.

It has a population of 2,009 (register office, 2025).

Economy is based on agriculture, with, in particular, the cultivation of cereals. Sights include the parish church of St. Michael Archangel (18th century) and a castle, with a Romanesque chapel (renovated in the 18th century) and a square tower of Islamic origin.
