= Bellmunt d'Urgell =

- Municipality
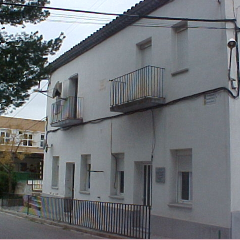
- School in Bellmunt d'Urgell

- Flag Coat of arms

- Location in Catalonia
- Coordinates: 41°46′22″N 0°57′5″E
- Country: Spain
- Community: Catalonia
- Province: Lleida
- Comarca: Noguera

Government
  - Mayor: Sònia Valero Dencas (2015)

Area
  - Total: 5.1 km^{2} (2.0 sq mi)

Population (2025-01-01)
  - Total: 174
  - Density: 34/km^{2} (88/sq mi)
- Website: www.ccnoguera.cat/bellmunt

Bellmunt d'Urgell (Catalan pronunciation: [ˌbeʎˈmun duɾˈdʒeʎ]) is a village in the province of Lleida and autonomous community of Catalonia, Spain.

It has a population of 174 (register office, 2025).
