= Noguera (comarca) =

Coordinates: 41°54′12″N 0°56′00″E

- Comarca
- Flag Coat of arms

- Country: Spain
- Autonomous community: Catalonia
- Region: Ponent
- Province: Lleida
- Capital: Balaguer
- Municipalities: List: Àger, Albesa, Algerri, Alòs de Balaguer, Artesa de Segre, Les Avellanes i Santa Linya, Balaguer, La Baronia de Rialb, Bellcaire d'Urgell, Bellmunt d'Urgell, Cabanabona, Camarasa, Castelló de Farfanya, Cubells, Foradada, Ivars de Noguera, Menàrguens, Montgai, Oliola, Os de Balaguer, Penelles, Ponts, Preixens, La Sentiu de Sió, Tiurana, Torrelameu, Térmens, Vallfogona de Balaguer, Vilanova de Meià, Vilanova de l'Aguda

Government
  - Body: Noguera Comarcal Council
  - President: Miquel Plensa (ERC)

Area
  - Total: 1,784.1 km^{2} (688.8 sq mi)

Population (2014)
  - Total: 39,376
  - Density: 22.071/km^{2} (57.162/sq mi)
- Demonym
- Time zone: UTC+1 (CET)
  - Summer (DST): UTC+2 (CEST)
- Largest municipality: Balaguer

Noguera (Western Catalan: [noˈɣeɾa]) is a comarca (county) in Ponent, Catalonia, Spain. It is the largest comarca and its area represents some 5,56% of Catalonia. Noguera is part of the historical county of Urgell and its capital is Balaguer.

== Municipalities ==
Municipality	Population (2014)	Area km^{2}
Àger	594	160.6
Albesa	1,608	37.6
Algerri	423	54.3
Alòs de Balaguer	126	69.1
Artesa de Segre	3,656	175.9
Les Avellanes i Santa Linya	479	103.0
Balaguer	16,485	57.3
La Baronia de Rialb	235	145.1
Bellcaire d'Urgell	1,305	31.4
Bellmunt d'Urgell	192	5.1
Cabanabona	88	14.2
Camarasa	911	157.1
Castelló de Farfanya	565	52.6
Cubells	395	39.2
Foradada	182	28.6
Ivars de Noguera	350	27.1
Menàrguens	887	20.2
Montgai	671	28.9
Oliola	235	86.3
Os de Balaguer	1,008	136.0
Penelles	504	25.5
Ponts	2,701	30.5
Preixens	450	28.7
La Sentiu de Sió	467	29.6
Térmens	1,536	27.5
Tiurana	76	15.9
Torrelameu	709	10.9
Vallfogona de Balaguer	1,888	27.0
Vilanova de l'Aguda	228	53.7
Vilanova de Meià	422	105.2
• Total: 30	39,376	1,784.1
