= Bellcaire d'Urgell =

- Municipality
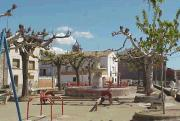
- Plaça del Mercat

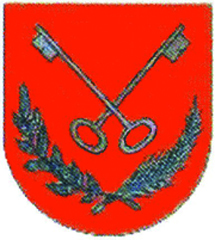
- Coat of arms

- Location in Catalonia
- Coordinates: 41°45′40″N 0°54′20″E
- Country: Spain
- Community: Catalonia
- Province: Lleida
- Comarca: La Noguera

Government
  - Mayor: Jaume Montfort Samà (2015)

Area
  - Total: 31.4 km^{2} (12.1 sq mi)
- Elevation: 267 m (876 ft)

Population (2025-01-01)
  - Total: 1,275
  - Density: 40.6/km^{2} (105/sq mi)
- Demonym: Bellcairenc
- Postal code: 25691
- Website: bellcairedurgell.cat

Bellcaire d'Urgell (Catalan pronunciation: [ˌbeʎˈkajɾe ðuɾˈdʒeʎ]) is a municipality in the comarca of the Noguera in Catalonia, Spain.

It has a population of 1,275 (register office, 2025).

== See also ==
- Urgell
