= Su, Catalonia =

Su
- Village
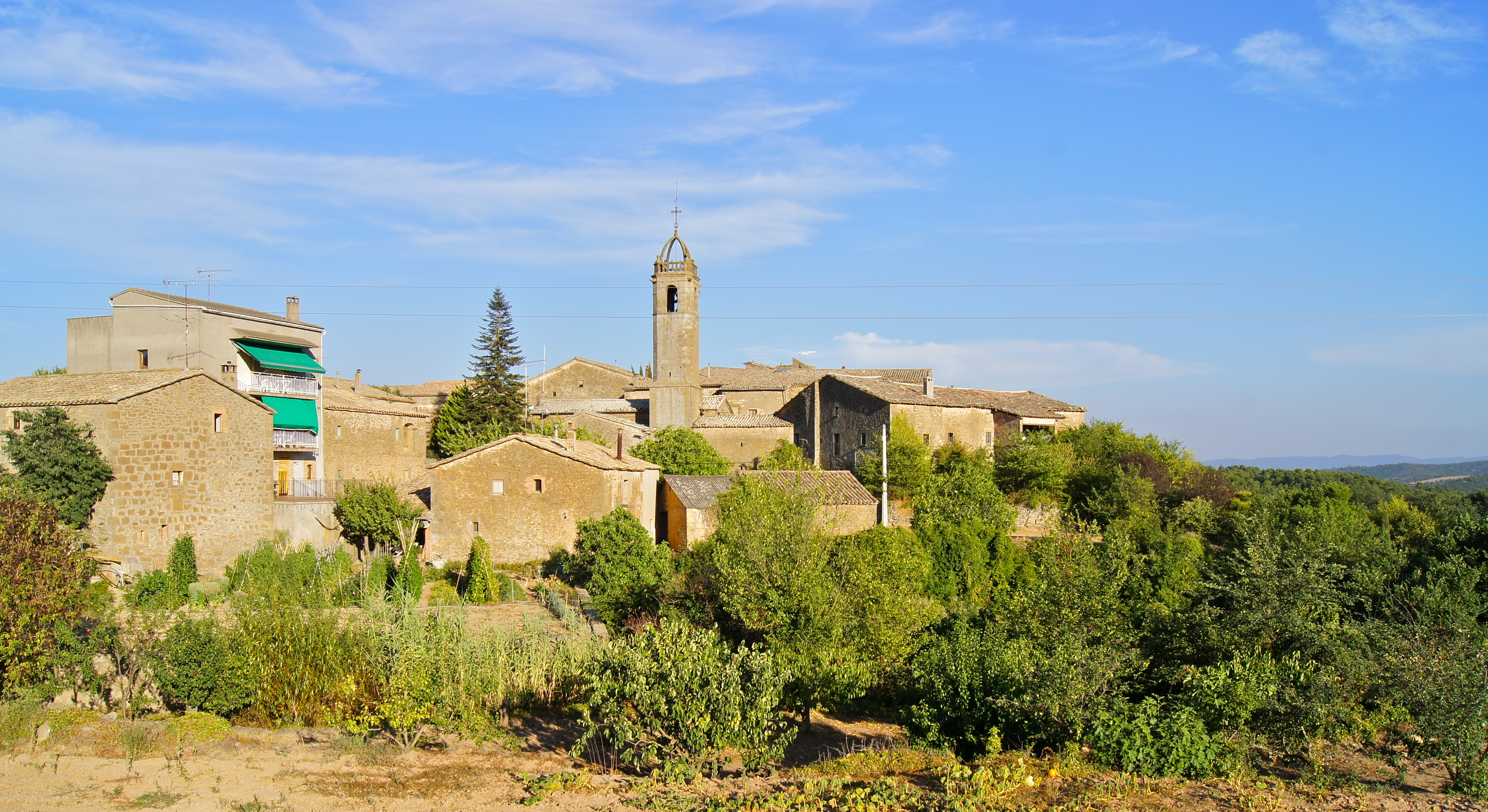

- Location in Catalonia Su (Spain)
- Coordinates: 41°53′18″N 1°33′51″E
- Country: Spain
- Autonomous community: Catalonia
- Province: Lleida
- Vegueria: Comarques Centrals
- Comarca: Solsonès
- Municipality: Riner
- Elevation: 726 m (2,382 ft)

Population (2017)
  - Total: 37
- Time zone: UTC+1 (CET)
  - Summer (DST): UTC+2 (CEST)
- Postal code: 25287
- Linguistic Predominance: Catalan

Su is a small village in Catalonia, Spain.

== Geographical area ==
Su, belongs to the municipality of Riner, in the comarca of Solsonès, vegueria of Comarques Centrals (Catalonia). Su is situated at an elevation of 726 meters above sea level.

== Population ==
In the year 2017, this rural community was recorded to have 37 residents.

== Outdoor Activities in Su ==
•Hiking in Su, Catalonia (Spain).

•Mountain Biking in Su, Catalonia (Spain).

•Road Biking in Su, Catalonia (Spain).

•Running in Su, Catalonia (Spain).

•Walking in Su, Catalonia (Spain).

•Trail Running in Su, Catalonia (Spain).

•Road trips in Su, Catalonia (Spain).

•Road Motorbiking in Su, Catalonia (Spain).
