= Sant Llorenç de Morunys =

- Municipality
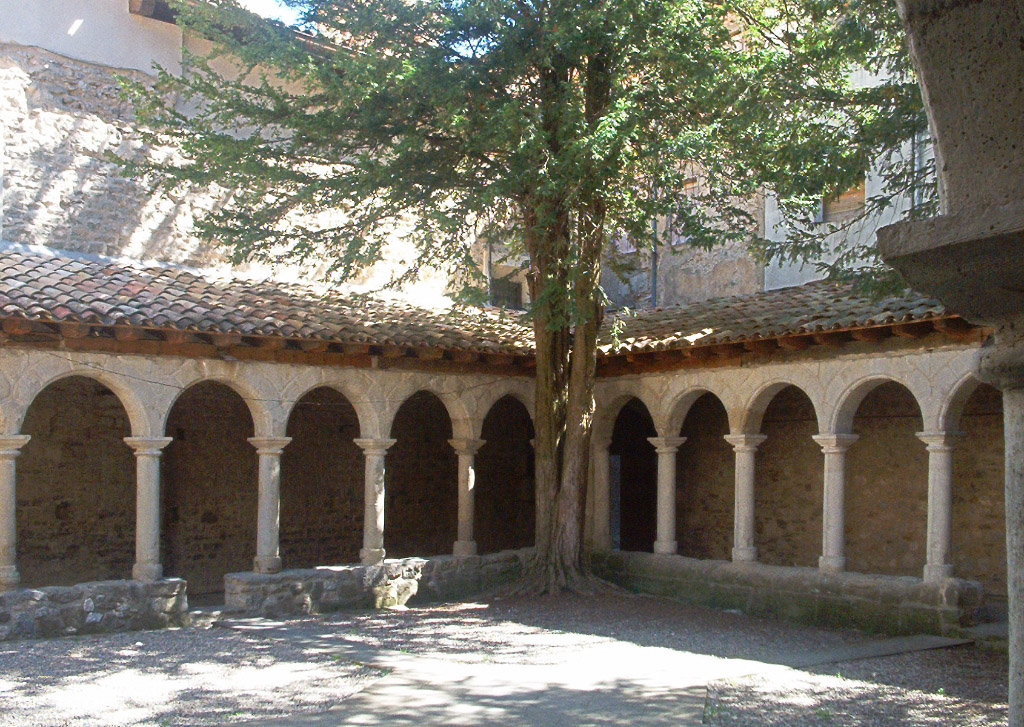

- Flag Coat of arms

- Location in Catalonia
- Coordinates: 42°08′19″N 1°35′30″E
- Country: Spain
- Community: Catalonia
- Province: Lleida
- Comarca: Solsonès

Government
  - Mayor: Francesc Xavier Mas Pintó (2015)

Area
  - Total: 4.3 km^{2} (1.7 sq mi)
- Elevation: 925 m (3,035 ft)

Population (2025-01-01)
  - Total: 983
  - Density: 230/km^{2} (590/sq mi)
- Demonym(s): Piteu, pitea
- Website: santllorens.ddl.net

Sant Llorenç de Morunys (Catalan pronunciation: [ˈsaɲ ʎuˈɾɛnz ðə muˈɾuɲs]) is a municipality in the comarca of the Solsonès in Catalonia, Spain. It has a population of 983 (register office, 2025).

It is situated in the Lord valley in the north of the comarca below the pyrenean massif of Port del Comte. The shrine of Lord is located in an exclave of the municipality between Guixers and Navès. The town is served by the L-401 road between Coll de Nargó and Berga.

The medieval walls of the town and four of the gateways have been preserved. The eleventh-century church of Sant Llorenç is a protected historico-artistic monument.

A Benedictine Monestir de Sant Llorenç de Morunys was built in the 11th century, continuing the romanesque architecture.

== Demography ==
1900	1930	1950	1970	1986	2007
769	653	665	811	885	1004
