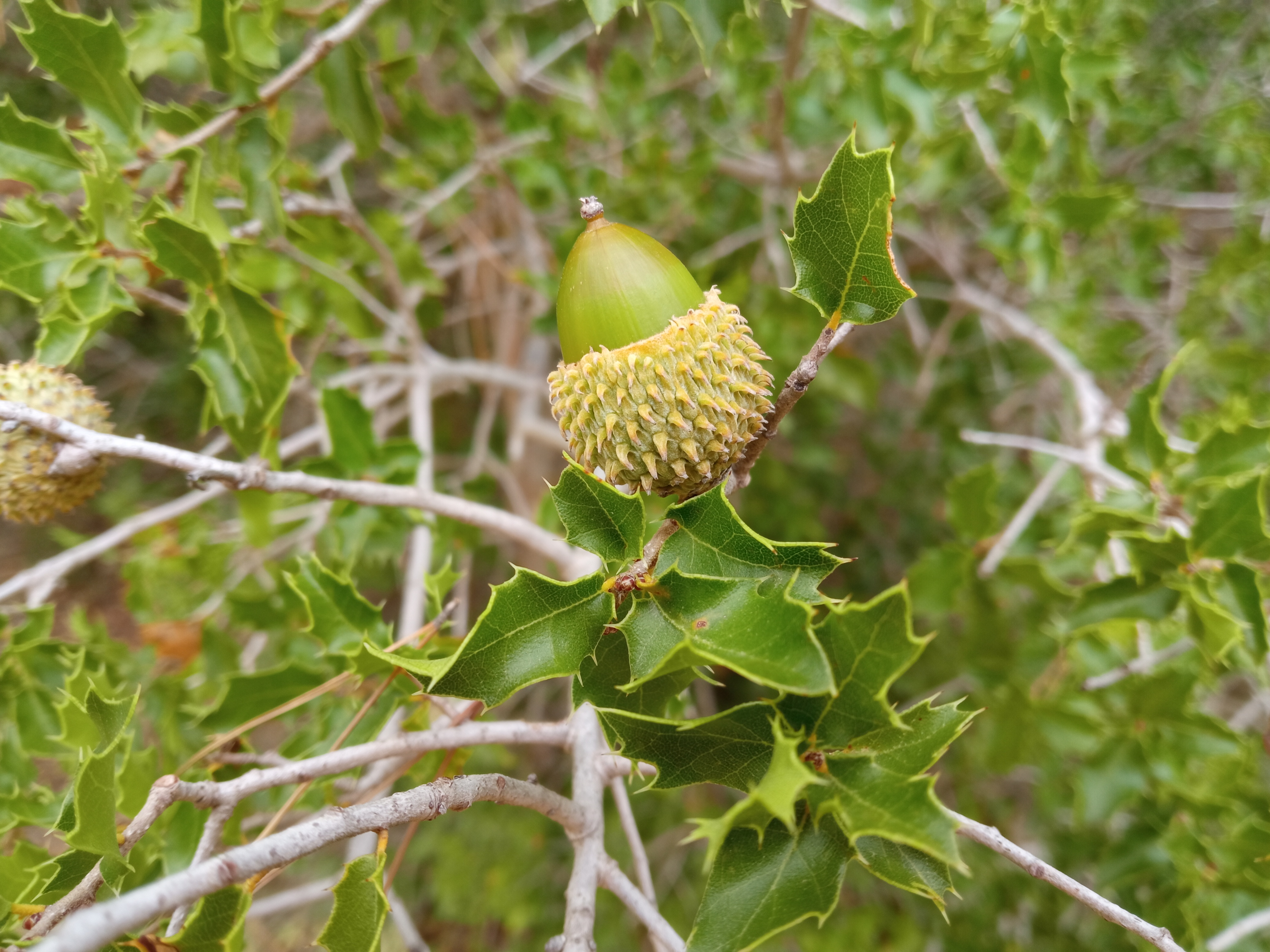

Conservation status
- Least Concern (IUCN 3.1)

Scientific classification
- Kingdom: Plantae
- Clade: Tracheophytes
- Clade: Angiosperms
- Clade: Eudicots
- Clade: Rosids
- Order: Fagales
- Family: Fagaceae
- Genus: Quercus
- Subgenus: Quercus subg. Cerris
- Section: Quercus sect. Ilex
- Species: Q. coccifera

Binomial name
- Quercus coccifera L.
- Distribution map

Synonyms
- List: Ilex aculeata Garsault; Quercus aquifolia Kotschy ex A.DC., nom. subnud.; Quercus arcuata Kotschy ex A.DC.; Quercus brachybalanos Kotschy ex A.DC.; Quercus calliprinos Webb; Quercus chainolepis Kotschy ex A.DC.; Quercus coccifera subsp. calliprinos (Webb) Holmboe; Quercus coccifera subsp. cryptocarpa Svent. & Marcet; Quercus coccifera subsp. kryptocarpa Svent. & Marcet; Quercus coccifera subsp. palaestina (Kotschy) Holmboe; Quercus consobrina Kotschy ex A.DC.; Quercus cretica Raulin ex A.DC., pro syn.; Quercus dipsacina Kotschy ex A.DC.; Quercus dispar Kotschy ex A.DC., nom. illeg.; Quercus echinata Kotschy ex A.DC., not validly publ.; Quercus fenzlii Kotschy; Quercus inops Kotschy ex A.DC., not validly publ.; Quercus mesto Boiss.; Quercus obtecta Poir.; Quercus palaestina Kotschy; Quercus pentadactyla Bosc; Quercus pseudorigida Kotschy ex A.Camus; Quercus recurvans Kotschy ex A.DC.; Quercus rigida Willd.; Quercus sibthorpii Kotschy ex Boiss.; Quercus valida Kotschy ex A.DC.; Scolodrys rigida (Willd.) Raf.

= Quercus coccifera =

Kermes oak

Species of tree

Quercus coccifera, commonly known as kermes oak, holly oak, or Palestine oak, is an evergreen oak shrub or tree in section Ilex of the genus. It has many synonyms, including Quercus calliprinos. It is native to the Mediterranean region and Northern African Maghreb, south to north from Morocco to France and west to east from Portugal to Cyprus, Anatolia, and the Levant, crossing Spain, Italy, Libya, the Balkans, and Greece, including Crete. The Kernes oak was historically important as the food plant of Kermes scale insects, from which a red dye called crimson was obtained. The etymology of the specific name coccifera is related to the production of red cochineal (crimson) dye and derived from Latin coccum which was from Greek κόκκος, the kermes insect. The Latin -fera means 'bearer'.

== Description ==
Quercus coccifera is usually a shrub less than 2 metres (6 1/2 feet) high, rarely a small tree, reaching 1–6 metres (3 1/2–19 1/2 ft) tall (with 10 m or 33 ft specimens recorded in Kouf, Libya).

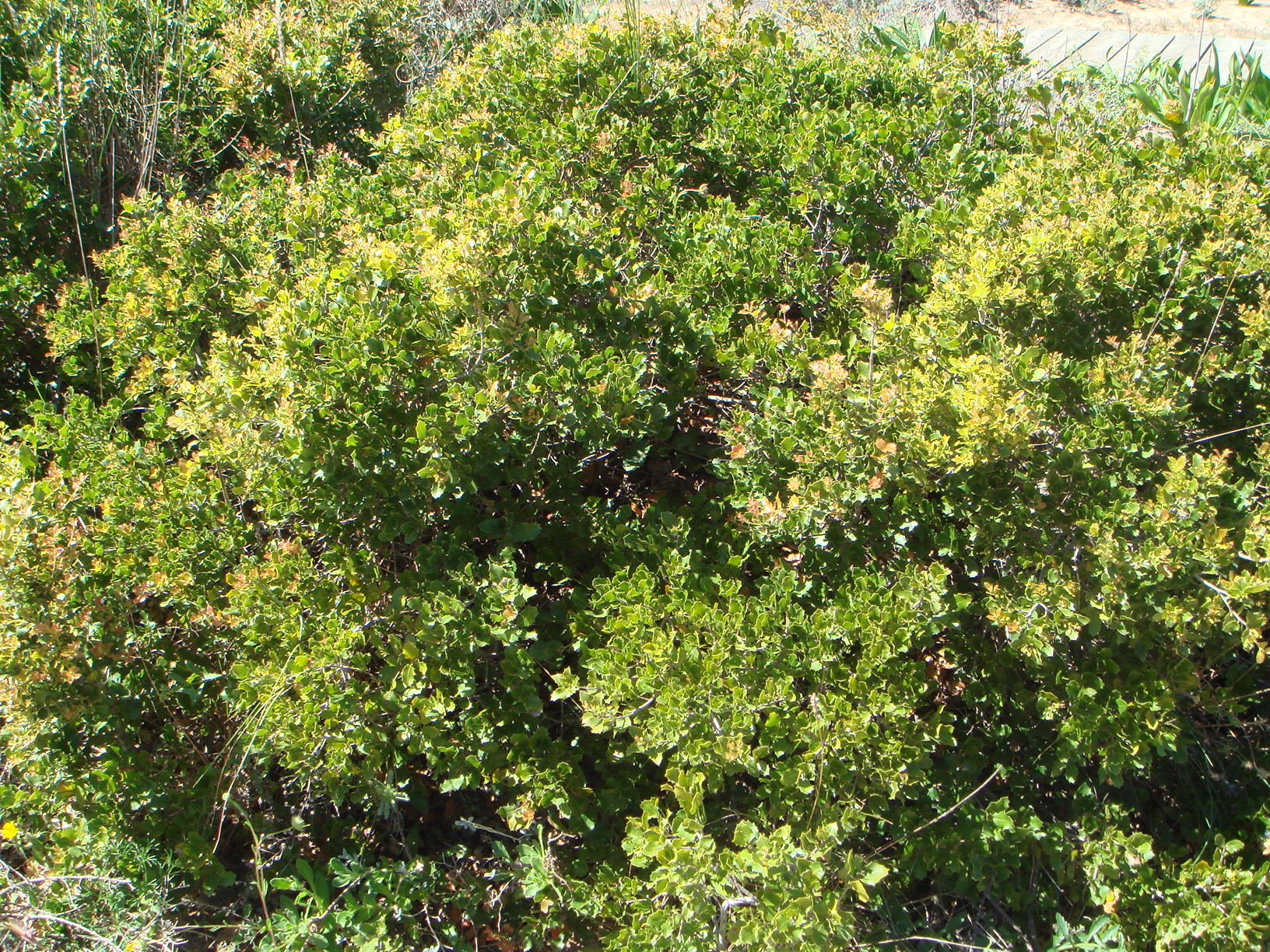
Lush Q. coccifera bush in coastal area, with easier growing consitions

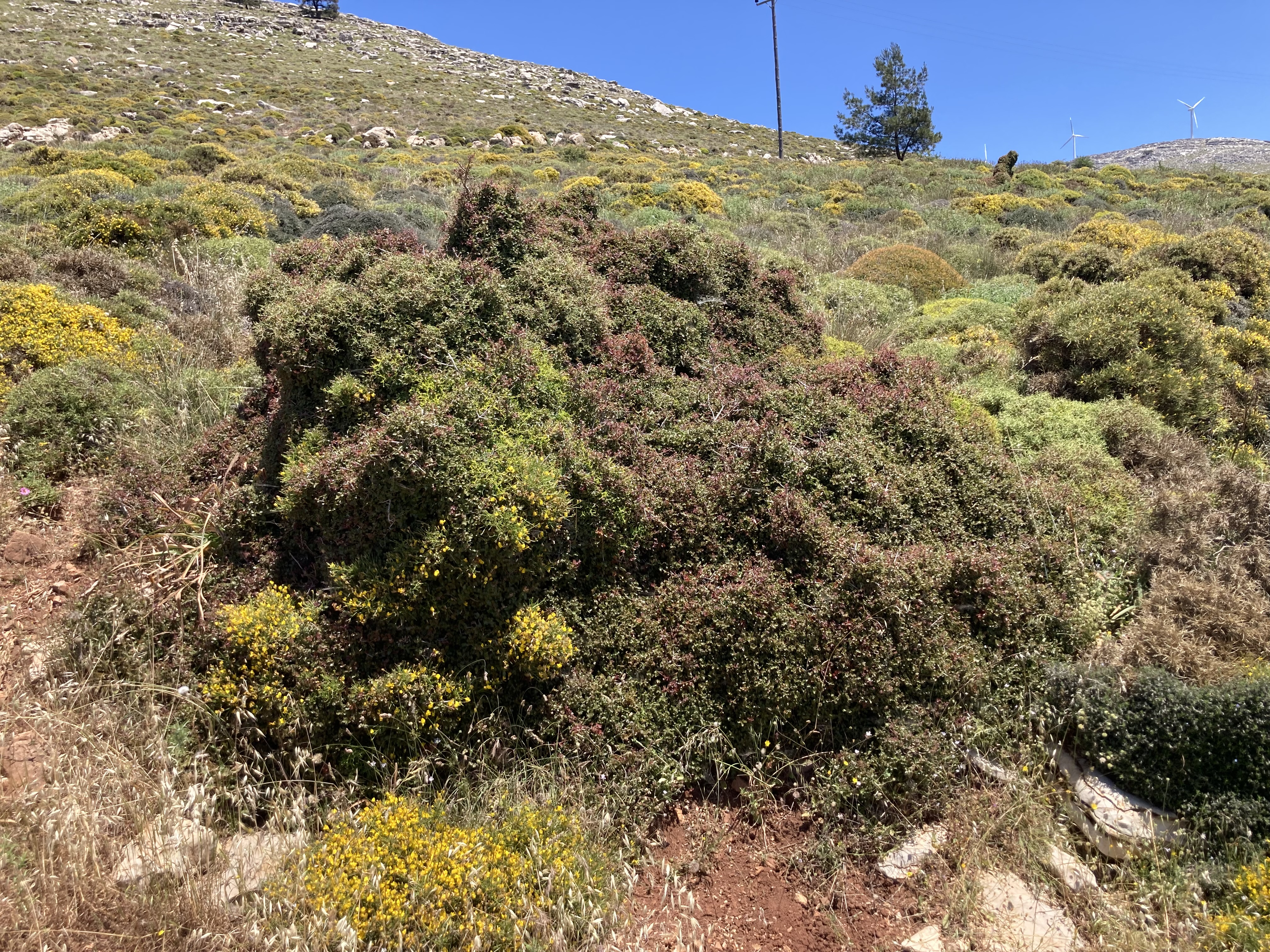
Severely stunted Q. coccifera due to intense wind and grazing pressure on Mount Attavyros, Rhodes. ( It is the reddish tipped shrub)

== Taxonomy ==
=== Quercus coccifera ===
Quercus coccifera was first described by Carl Linnaeus in 1753. It is called "chêne des garrigues" (garrigue oak) in French. The term "garrigue" comes from Catalan or Occitan "garric" (meaning "twisted") the name for Q. coccifera in those languages. A common Spanish name of Q. coccifera is chaparro, which refers to its small size, a feature it shares with other oak species in similar habitats in other parts of the world, such as the chaparral communities from various parts of the Americas. The word chaparro comes from the Basque txapar meaning "little thicket". Quercus coccifera is placed in section Ilex.

=== Quercus calliprinos ===
As of February 2023, Plants of the World Online regards it as a synonym of Quercus coccifera, but this is widely disputed, with many authors, particularly in the eastern Mediterranean, considering it distinct at least at subspecies rank, if not as a species.

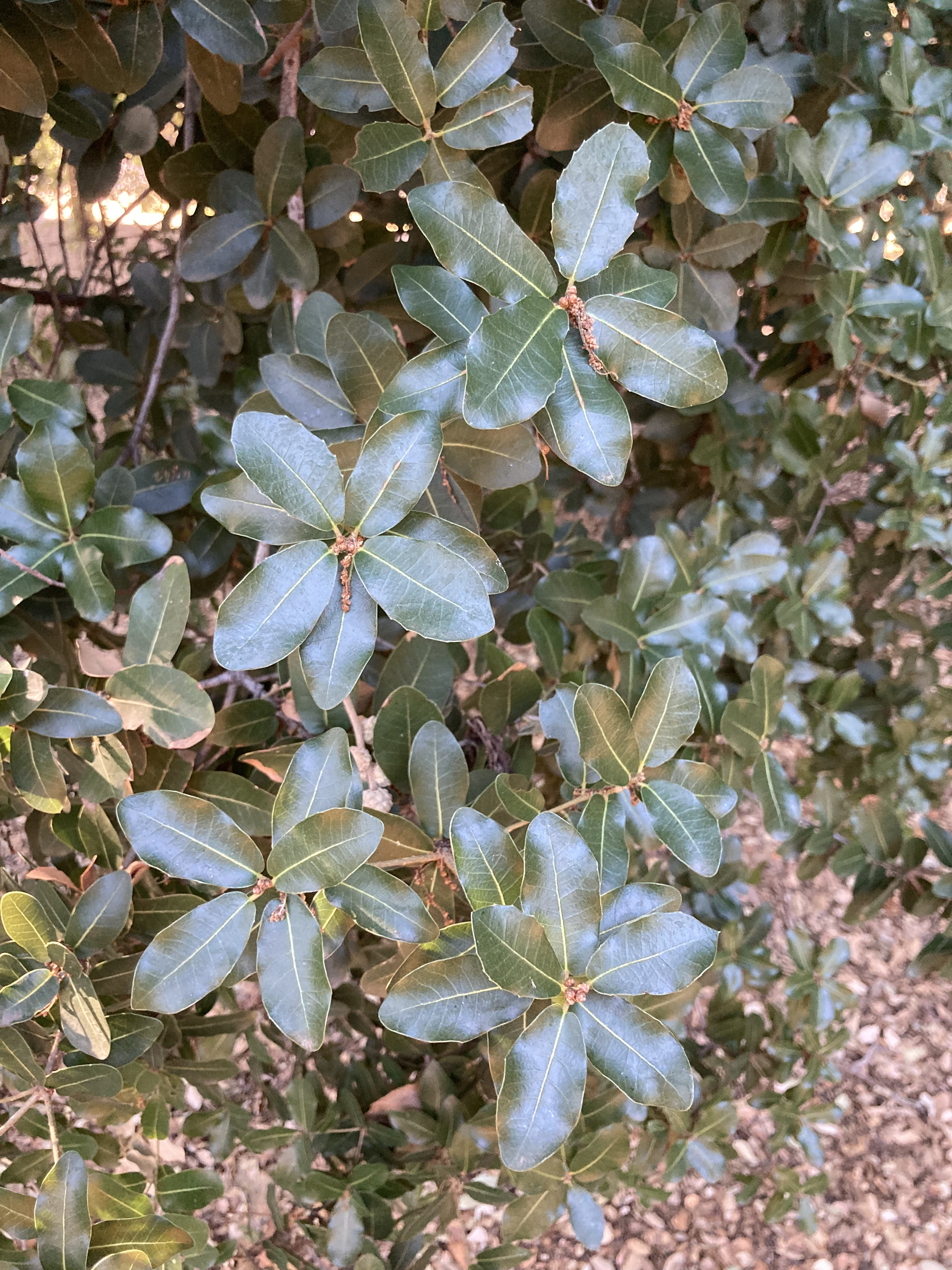
Quercus calliprinos subspecies has flatter leaves.

== Conservation ==
It is included as an endangered species in the Red Book of Bulgaria.

== Gallery ==
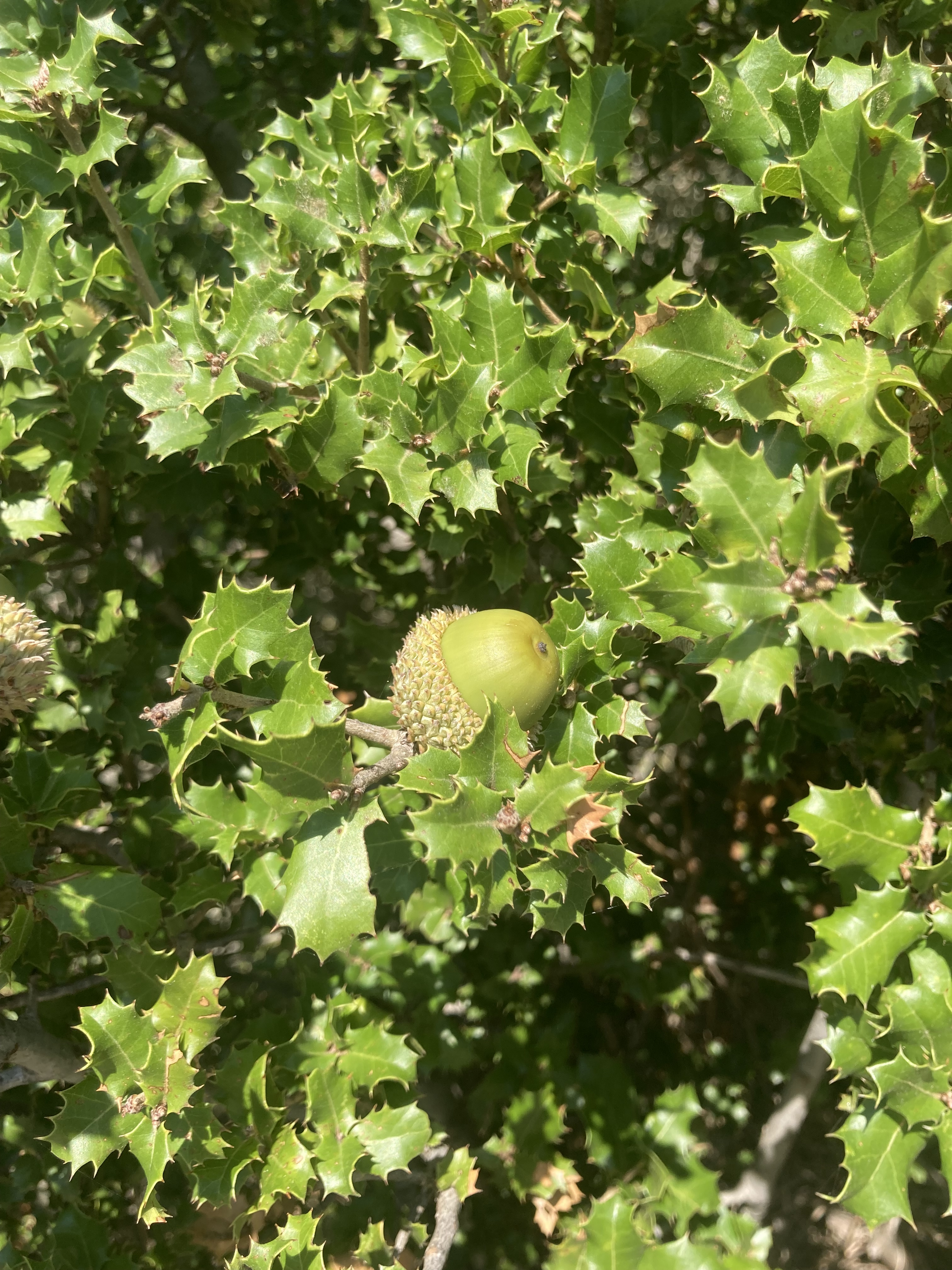
Kermes oak in Kythera

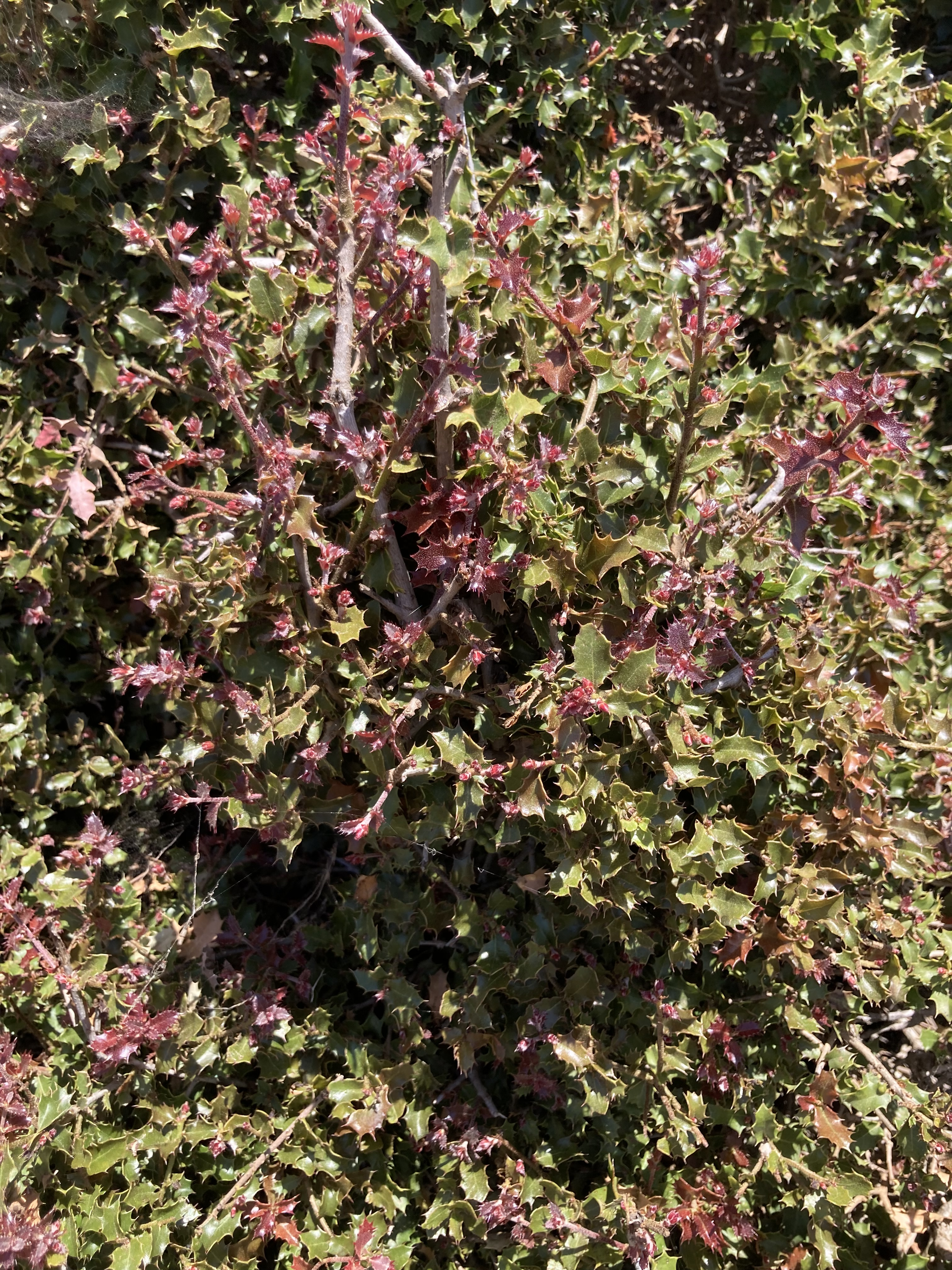
Under intense grazing pressure leaves are very small and spines proportionally larger.

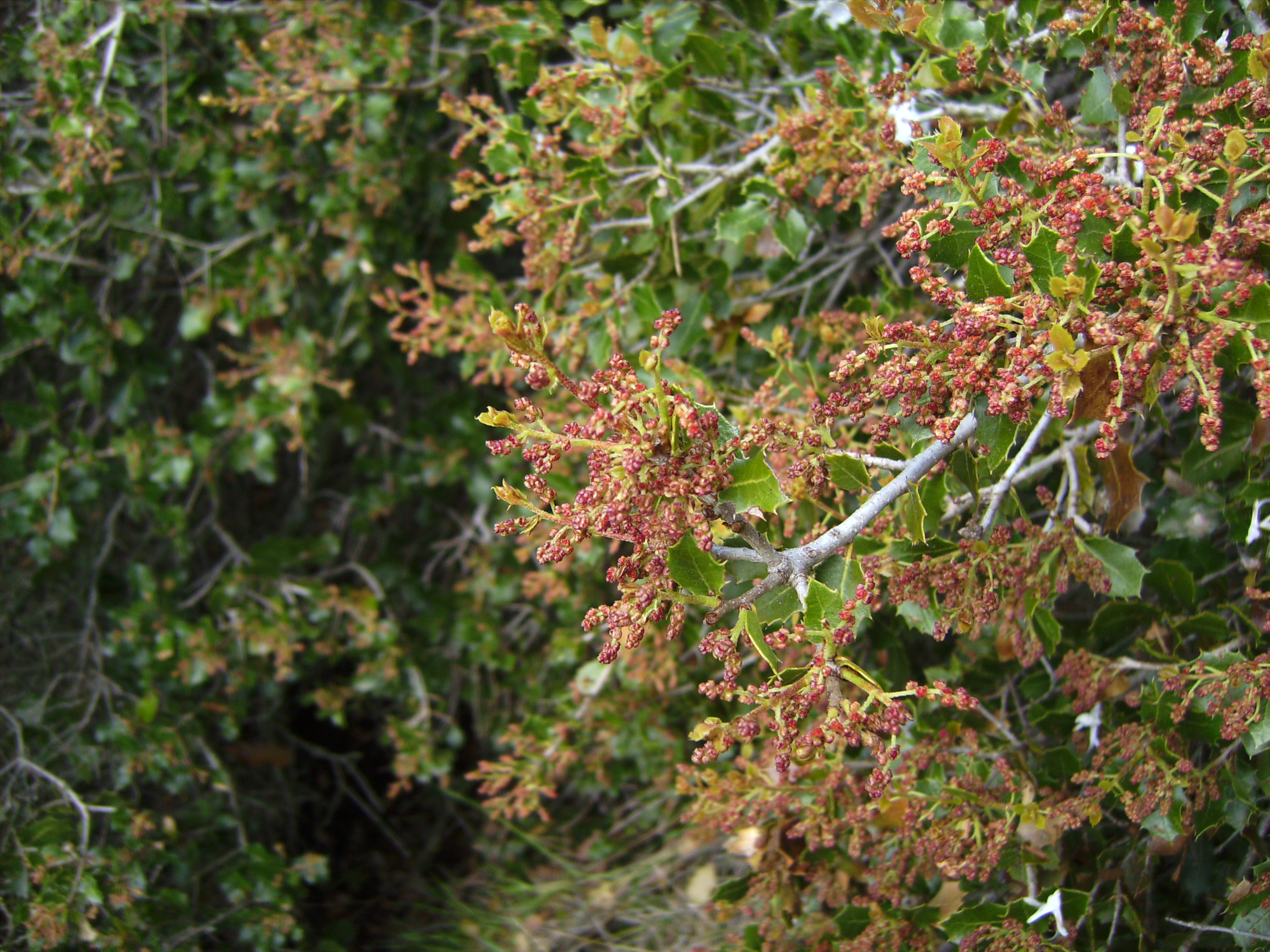
Flowering in the Castelltallat range

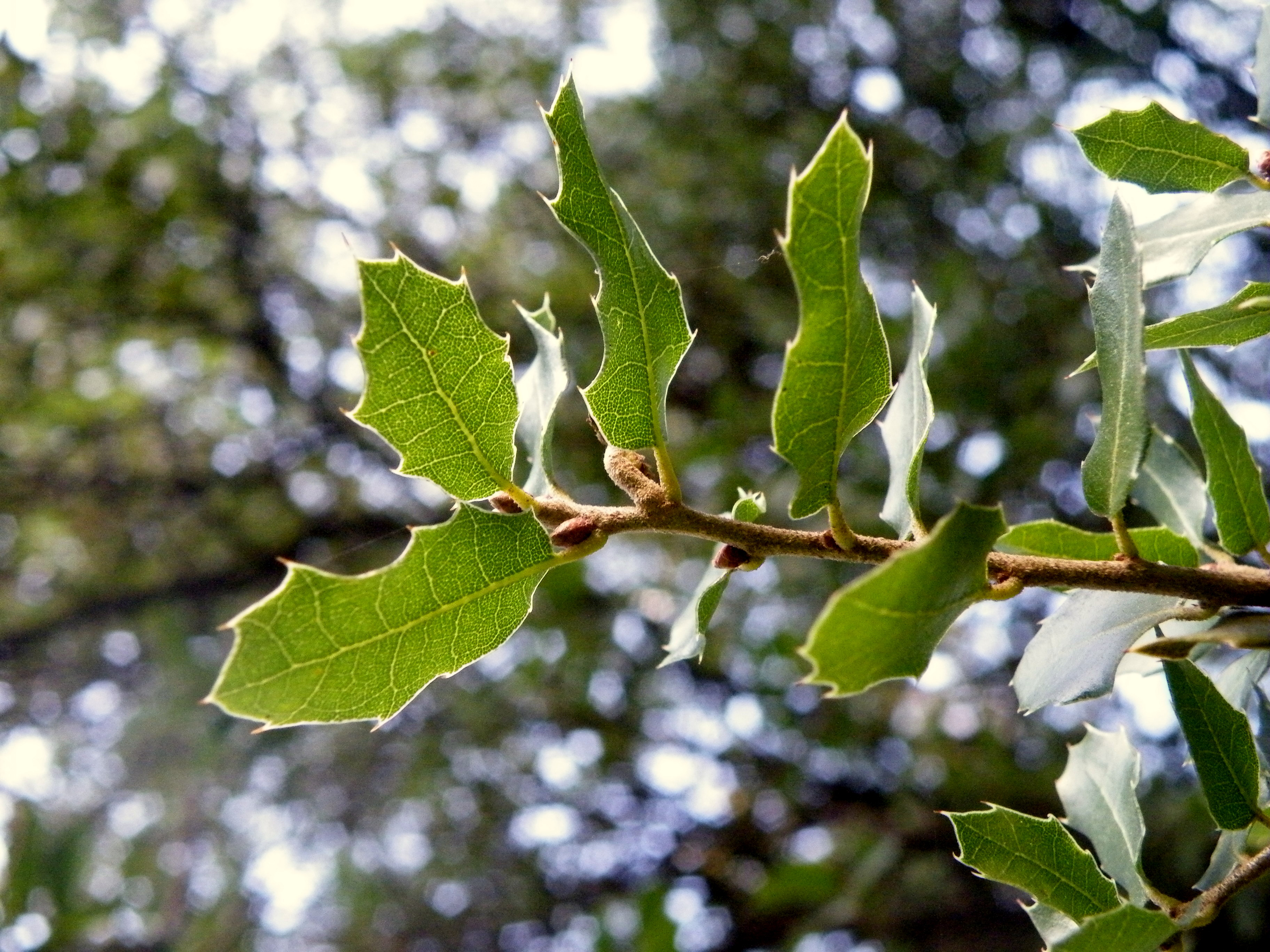
Leaves on branch

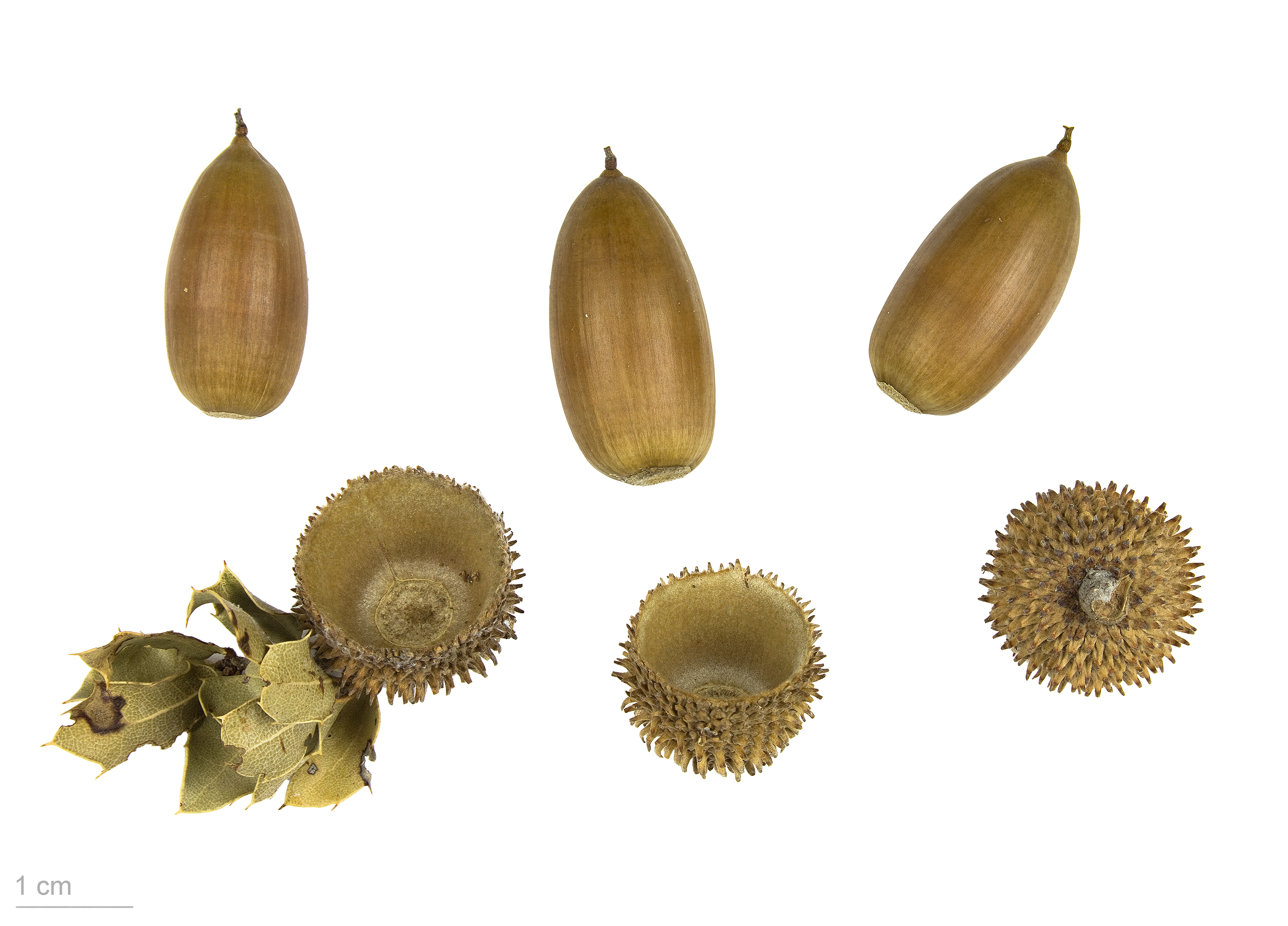
Acorns

== See also ==
- Mediterranean forests, woodlands, and scrub
- Kermes (dye)
