= La Coma i la Pedra =

- Municipality
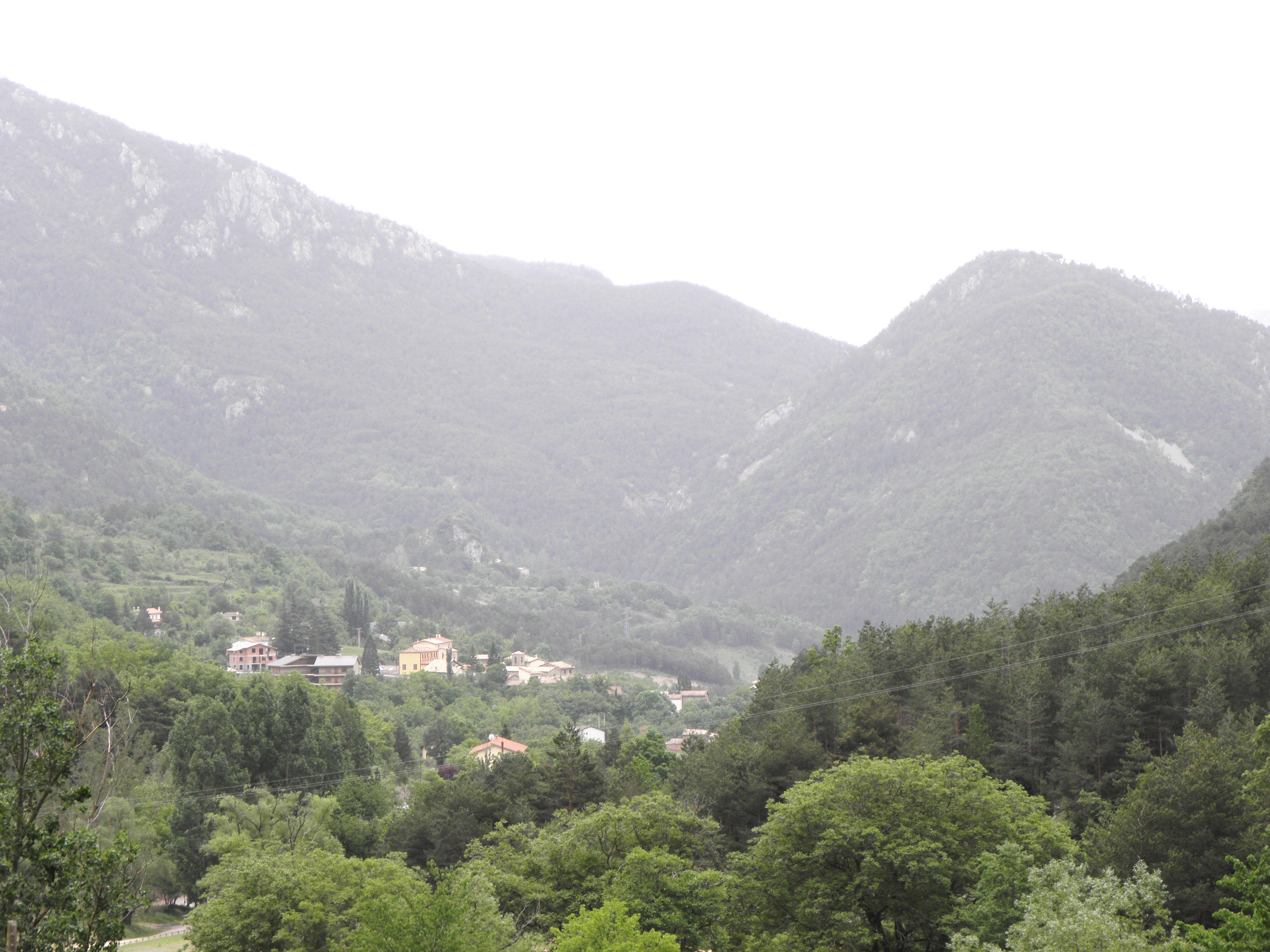
- The two villages

- Flag Coat of arms

- Location in Catalonia
- Coordinates: 42°10′40″N 1°35′27″E
- Country: Spain
- Community: Catalonia
- Province: Lleida
- Comarca: Solsonès

Government
  - Mayor: Jaume Oriol Grau (2015)

Area
  - Total: 60.6 km^{2} (23.4 sq mi)
- Elevation: 1,004 m (3,294 ft)

Population (2025-01-01)
  - Total: 277
  - Density: 4.57/km^{2} (11.8/sq mi)
- Demonym(s): Comardí, comardina
- Website: comapedra.cat

La Coma i la Pedra (Catalan pronunciation: [lə ˈkoməj lə ˈpeðɾə]) is a municipality in the comarca of the Solsonès in Catalonia, Spain. It has a population of 277 (register office, 2025).

It is situated in the Lord valley in the north of the comarca. The Cardener river has its source in the territory of the municipality. The local economy is traditionally based on livestock raising, although there is also a ski resort in the pyrenean massif of Port del Comte and a power station at Gafa. Local roads link the municipality with Sant Llorenç de Morunys and Josa i Tuixén.

== Subdivisions ==
The municipality of La Coma i la Pedra is formed by three villages. Populations are given as of 2005:

- La Coma (137)
- La Pedra (64), at the foot of the Pratformiu range
- El Port del Comte (69)

== Demography ==
1900	1930	1950	1970	1986	2007
487	482	437	427	254	252
