= Terrassola =

- Locality
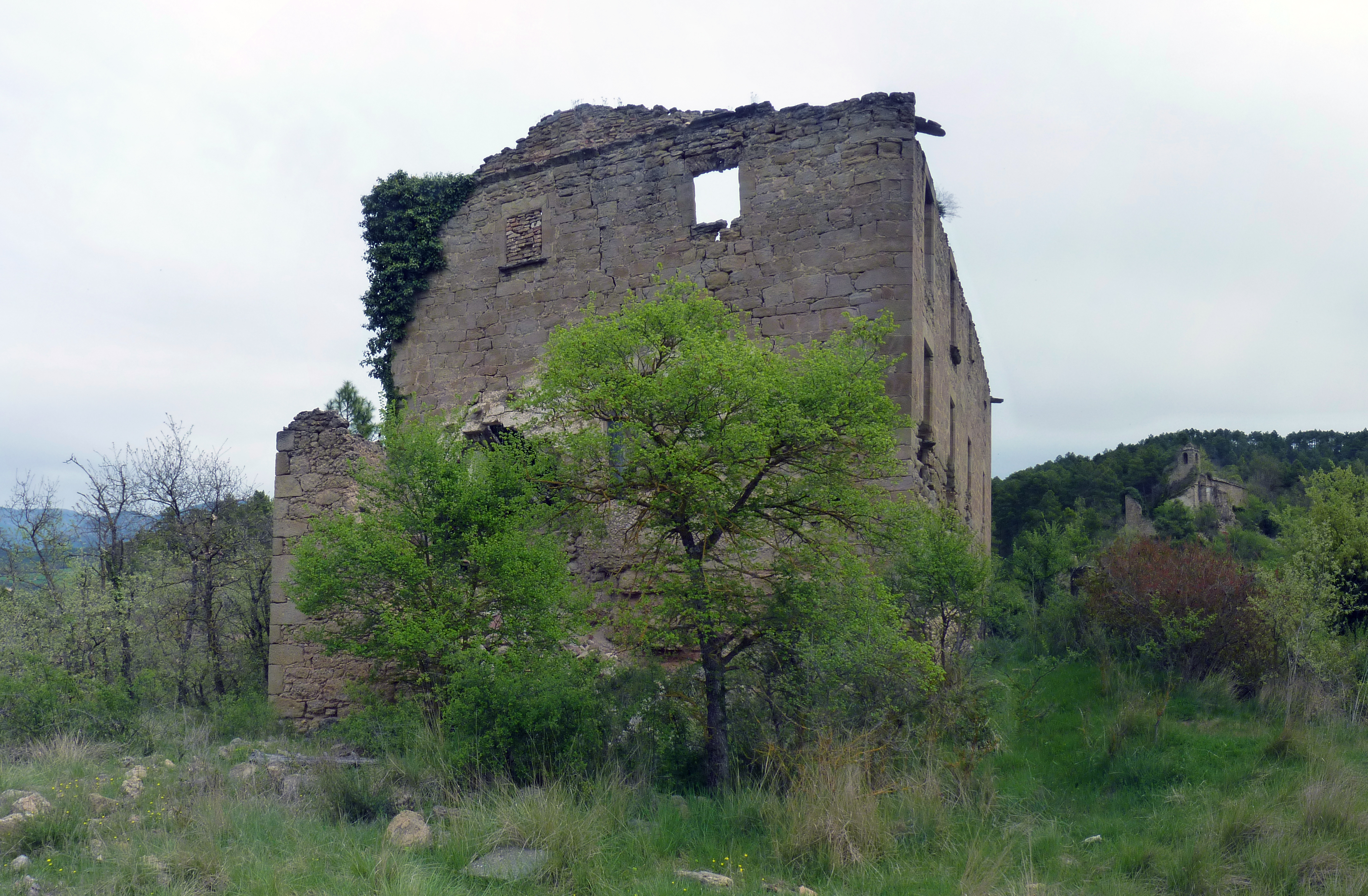

- Location within Province of Lleida Location within Catalonia Location within Spain
- Coordinates: 42°3′49″N 1°26′4″E
- Country: Spain
- Community: Catalonia
- Province: Lleida
- Municipality: Lladurs
- Elevation: 640 m (2,100 ft)

Population
  - Total: 21

Terrassola is a locality located in the municipality of Lladurs, in Province of Lleida province, Catalonia, Spain. As of 2020, it has a population of 21.

== Geography ==
Terrassola is located 123km northeast of Lleida.
