= Castelltallat range =

Mountain range in Spain

Castelltallat Range
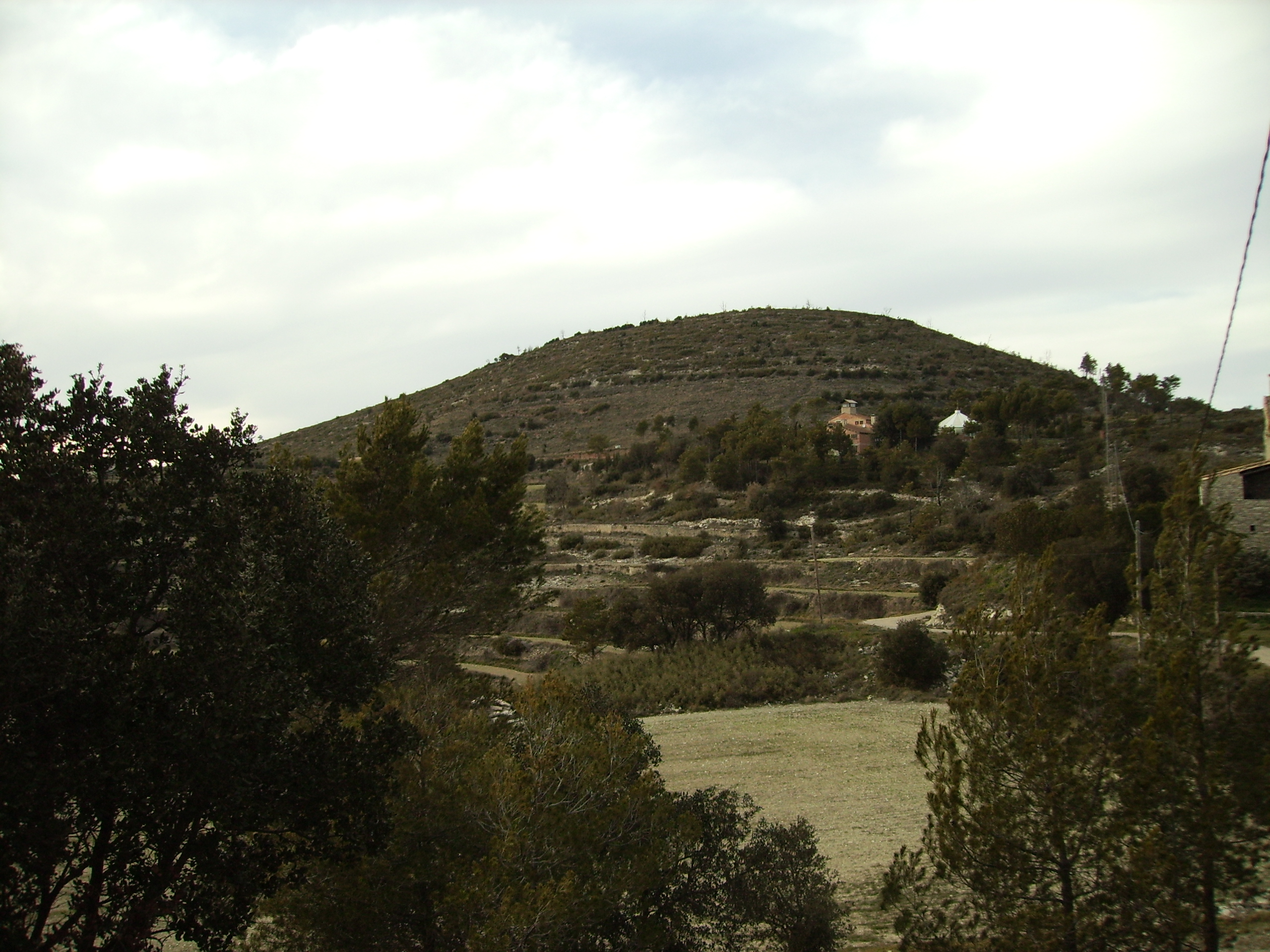
- El Tossal, Castelltallat's highest summit

Highest point
- Elevation: 887 m (2,910 ft)
- Coordinates: 41°47′30″N 1°38′00″E

Geography
- Location: Bages, Solsonès, Catalonia
- Parent range: Catalan Central Depression

Geology
- Mountain type(s): Limestone and marl

Climbing
- First ascent: Unknown
- Easiest route: From Sant Mateu de Bages

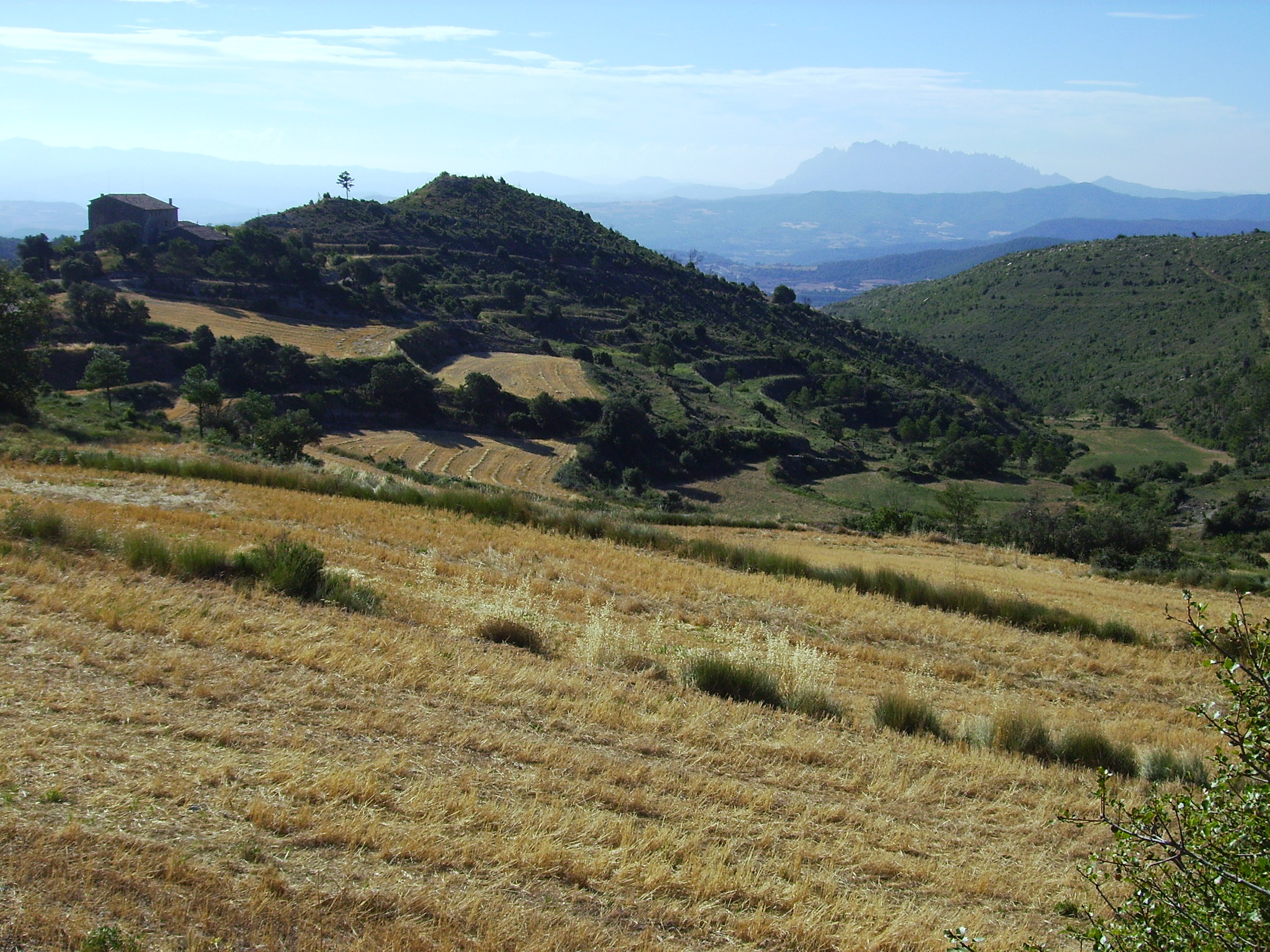
Castelltallat range with Montserrat, located south, in the background

The Castelltallat range (Catalan: Serra de Castelltallat) is located in central Catalonia (Spain) between the comarcas of Bages and Solsonès, extending over the provinces of Barcelona and Lleida, and occupying an area of about 65 square kilometres. It is one of the isolated hills of the Catalan Central Depression and is located at its southwestern end.

== Description ==
Geologically the Castelltallat range is made up of limestone and marl mountains oriented WSW-ENE. The highest point of the range is the 936 m high "Tossal". The northern slopes are steep and forested, while the southern slopes are used for agriculture owing to their lesser inclination.

Most of the mountain belongs to the municipality of Sant Mateu de Bages while the western part lies within the municipalities of Pinós and La Molsosa. The village of Castelltallat was a municipality until 1840 when it became part of San Mateu de Bages municipality. The parish church of Sant Miquel has been documented since 1031 and is located at an altitude of 887 m. The Church contains samples of Romanesque, Renaissance, Baroque and neoclassical architectural styles. It was built at the feet of the now ruined 10th or 11th century Castelltallat castle which gave its name to the mountain range, for "Castell talaiat" comes from the words "Castell", castle, and "Talaia", watchtower.

== Climate ==
Submediterranean climate with a mean annual temperature of 12 °C, January is the coldest month (3'5 °C) and July and August the warmest (21'5 °C) and annual precipitation of about 600 liters with little or no snow. Most of the range is part of an "Areas of Natural Interest Plan" (PEIN) of the government of Catalonia.

== Fauna and flora ==
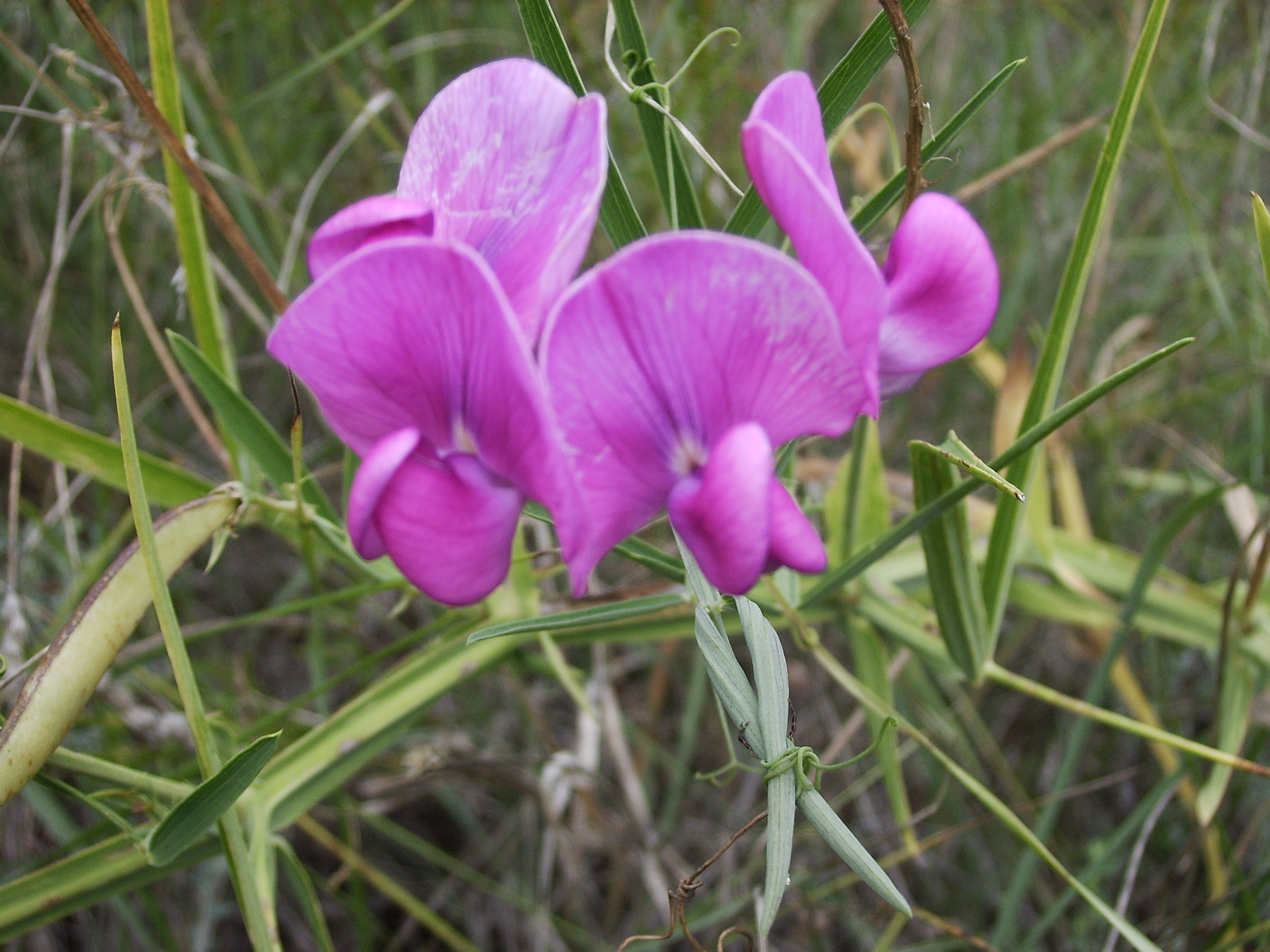
Lathyrus latifolius blooms from spring to autumn

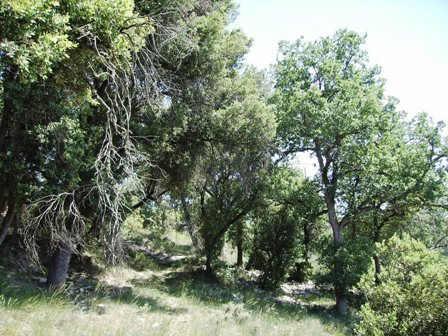
Wooded pastureland with Quercus ilex and Quercus pubescens

Before the wildfires of 1994 and 1998, pines dominated the landscape: Pinus nigra, Pinus halepensis Pinus sylvestris and a lesser extent Pinus pinea. After the fires Quercus humilis and Quercus ilex sprouts became the most visible trees. Where there is no forest predominate meadow Aphyllantion or Brachypodium and shrubs specially Dorycnum pentaphyllum and rosemary. It is remarkable for the presence of the gypsophilous plant named ruac (Ononis tridentata) in some small gypsum patches and the bastard balm (Melittis melissophyllum). Also interesting are the examples of yellow foxglove (Digitalis lutea), Primulas (Primula acaulis) and the broom (Genista cinerea).

The bird population seems to have been little affected by wildfires. Among the birds Eurasian eagle-owl ( Bubo bubo) is the greatest between the nesting birds. Since a few years it can see the griffon vulture (Gyps fulvus) fly, coming from the neighboring county of upper Solsonès. The number of partridges do not seem to have changed after wildfires.

Between feral mammals the number of wild boars and foxes is increasing. The population of rabbits in contrast, is highly variable.

== The astronomical observatory ==
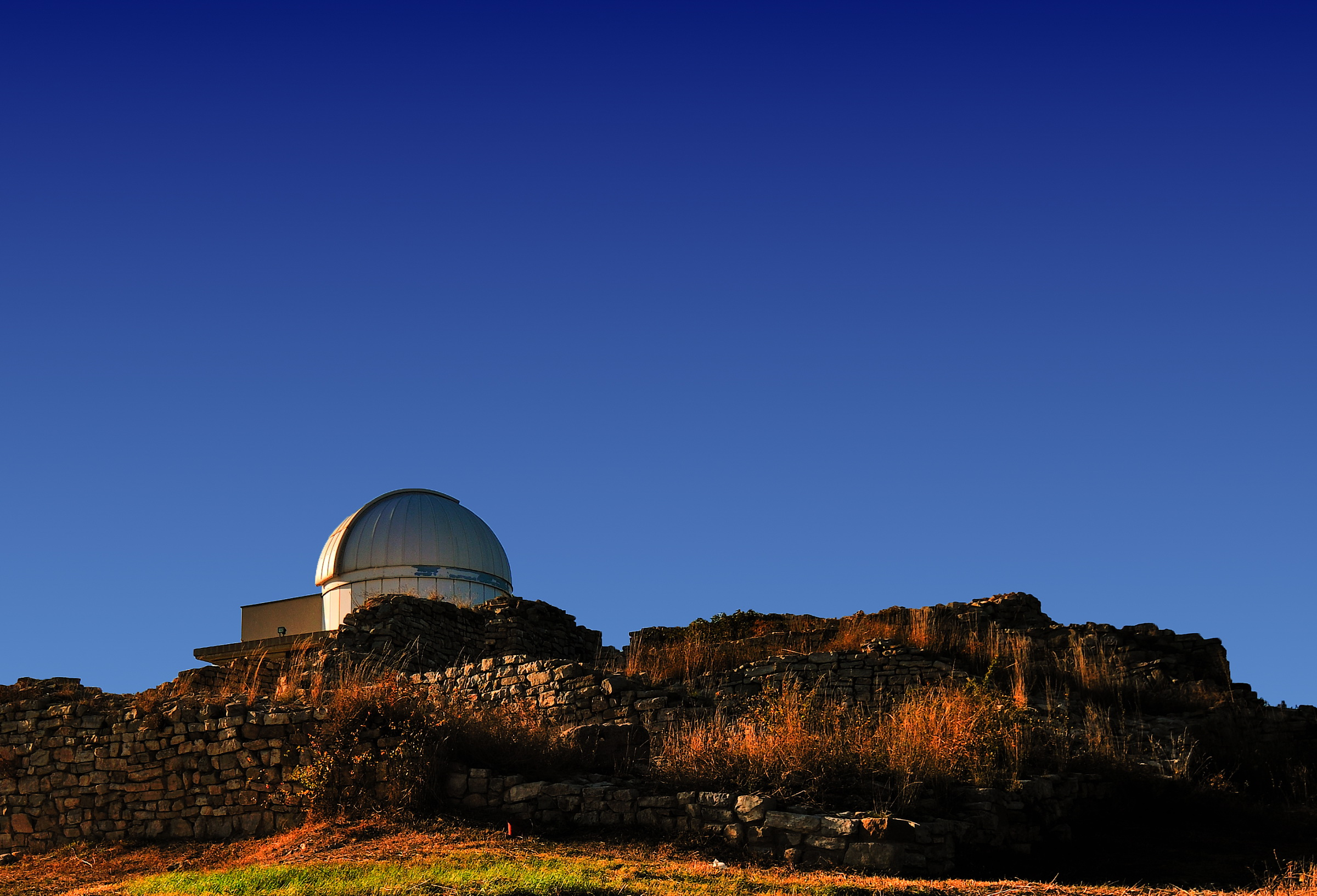
The observatory

The astronomical observatory was built close to the ruins of the ancient castle as part of the revitalization of the area after numerous forest fires. Opened in 2004, the dome of the observatory has a diameter of 5 meters and the telescope 400 mm.

== See also ==
- Catalan Central Depression
