= Timoneda =

- Locality
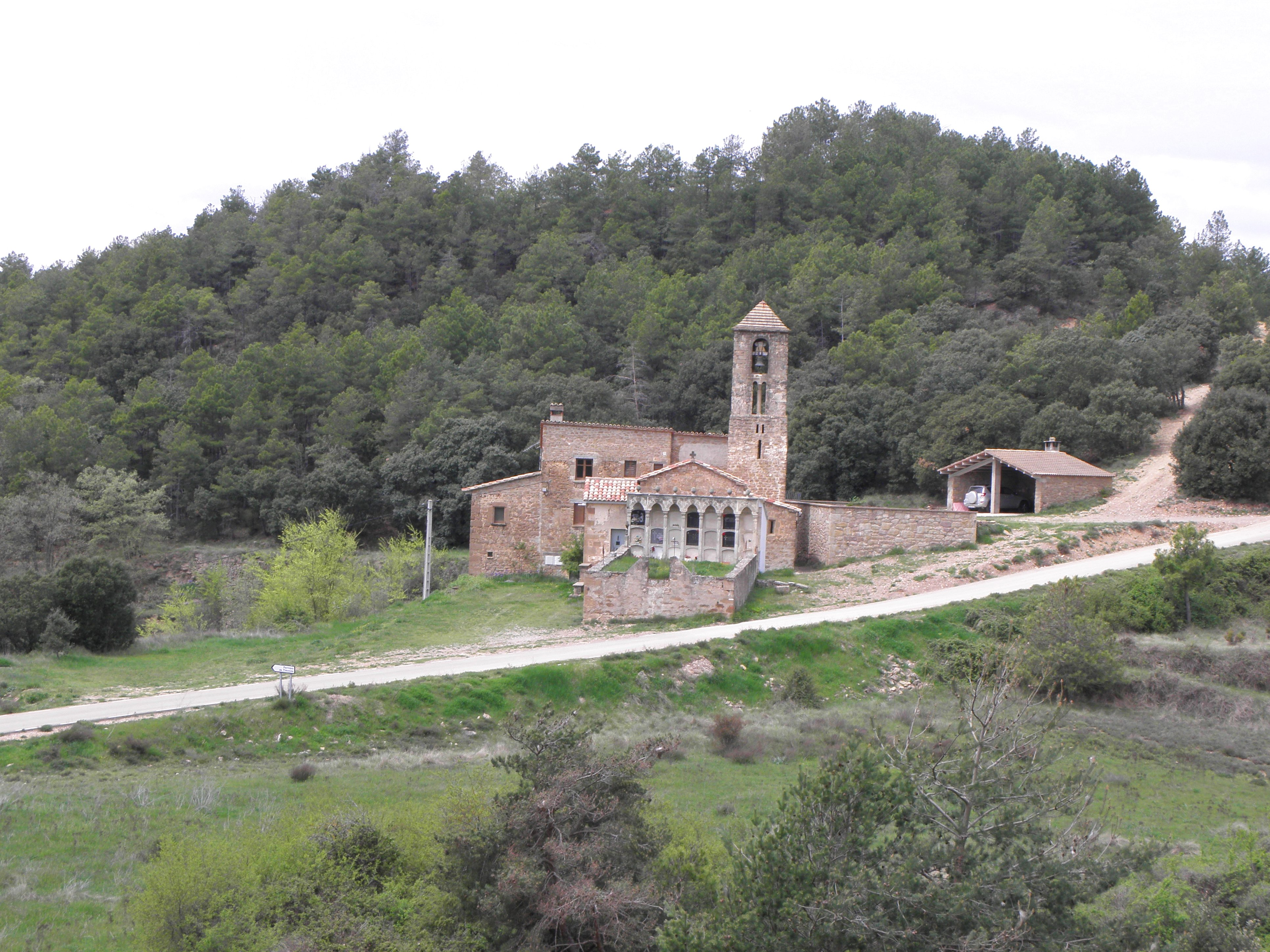

- Location within Province of Lleida Location within Catalonia Location within Spain
- Coordinates: 42°4′41″N 1°28′16″E
- Country: Spain
- Community: Catalonia
- Province: Lleida
- Municipality: Lladurs
- Elevation: 936 m (3,071 ft)

Population
  - Total: 17

Timoneda is a locality located in the municipality of Lladurs, in Province of Lleida province, Catalonia, Spain. As of 2020, it has a population of 17.

== Geography ==
Timoneda is located 126km northeast of Lleida.
