= La Coma (la Coma i la Pedra) =

- Locality
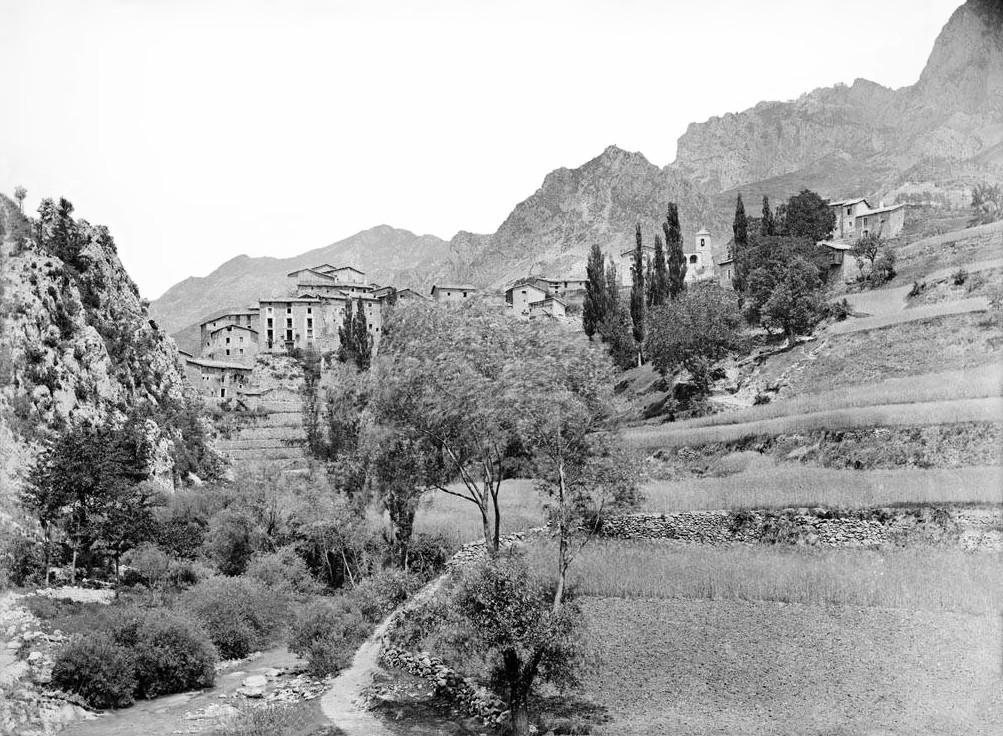

- Location within Province of Lleida Location within Catalonia Location within Spain
- Coordinates: 42°10′32″N 1°35′26″E
- Country: Spain
- Community: Catalonia
- Province: Lleida
- Municipality: La Coma i la Pedra
- Elevation: 1,002 m (3,287 ft)

Population
  - Total: 132

La Coma is a locality and the capital of the municipality of La Coma i la Pedra, in Province of Lleida province, Catalonia, Spain. As of 2020, it has a population of 132.

== Geography ==
La Coma is located 146km northeast of Lleida.
