= Odèn =

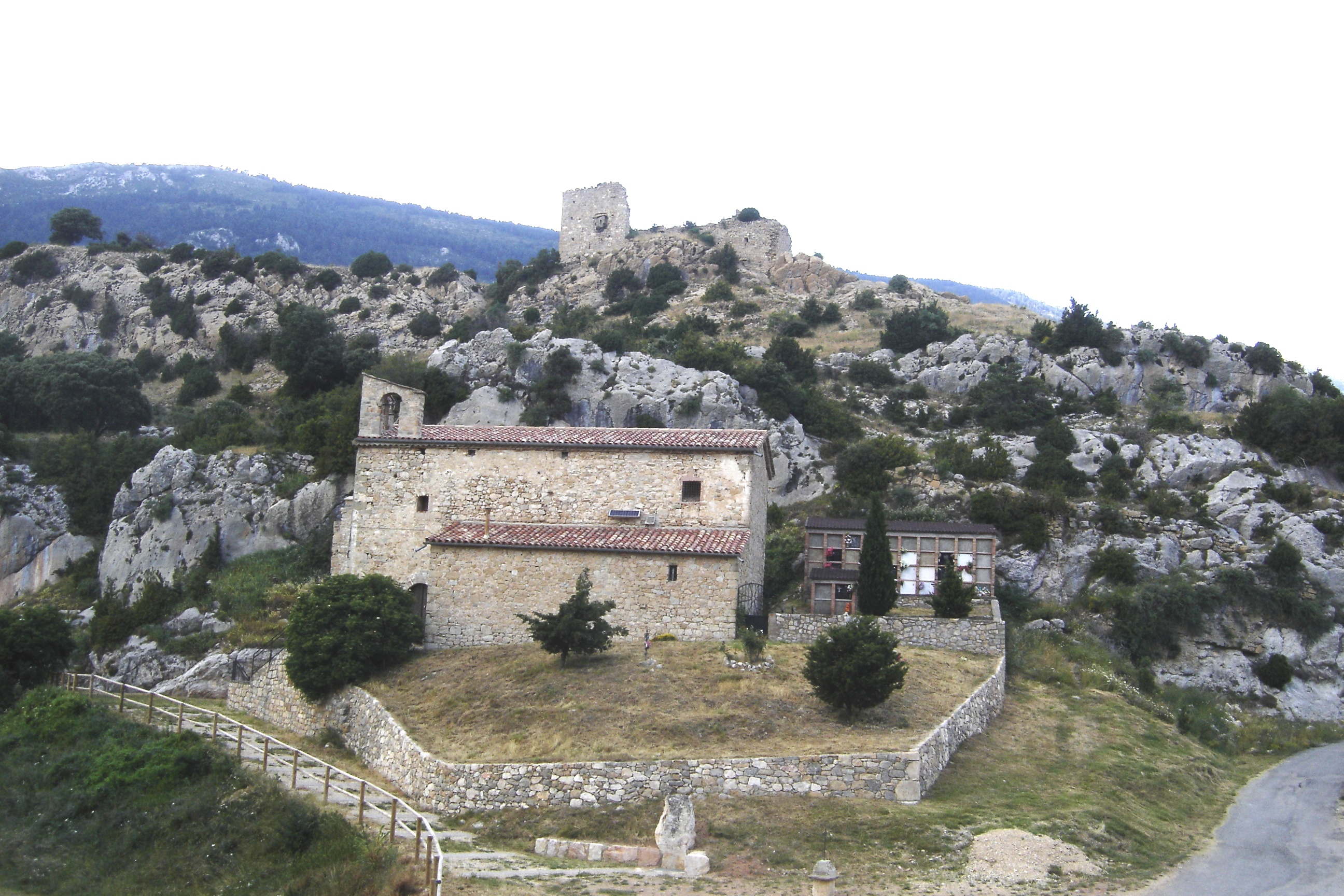
- Odèn castle and St. Cecilia's church

- Flag Coat of arms

- Location in Catalonia
- Coordinates: 42°8′8″N 1°23′17″E
- Country: Spain
- Community: Catalonia
- Province: Lleida
- Comarca: Solsonès

Government
  - Mayor: Pere Vilaginés Muntada (2015)

Area
  - Total: 114.4 km^{2} (44.2 sq mi)

Population (2025-01-01)
  - Total: 231
  - Density: 2.02/km^{2} (5.23/sq mi)
- Website: www.oden.cat

Odèn (Catalan pronunciation: [uˈðɛn]) is a village in the province of Lleida and autonomous community of Catalonia, Spain.

It has a population of 231 (register office, 2025).
