= La Pedra =

- Locality
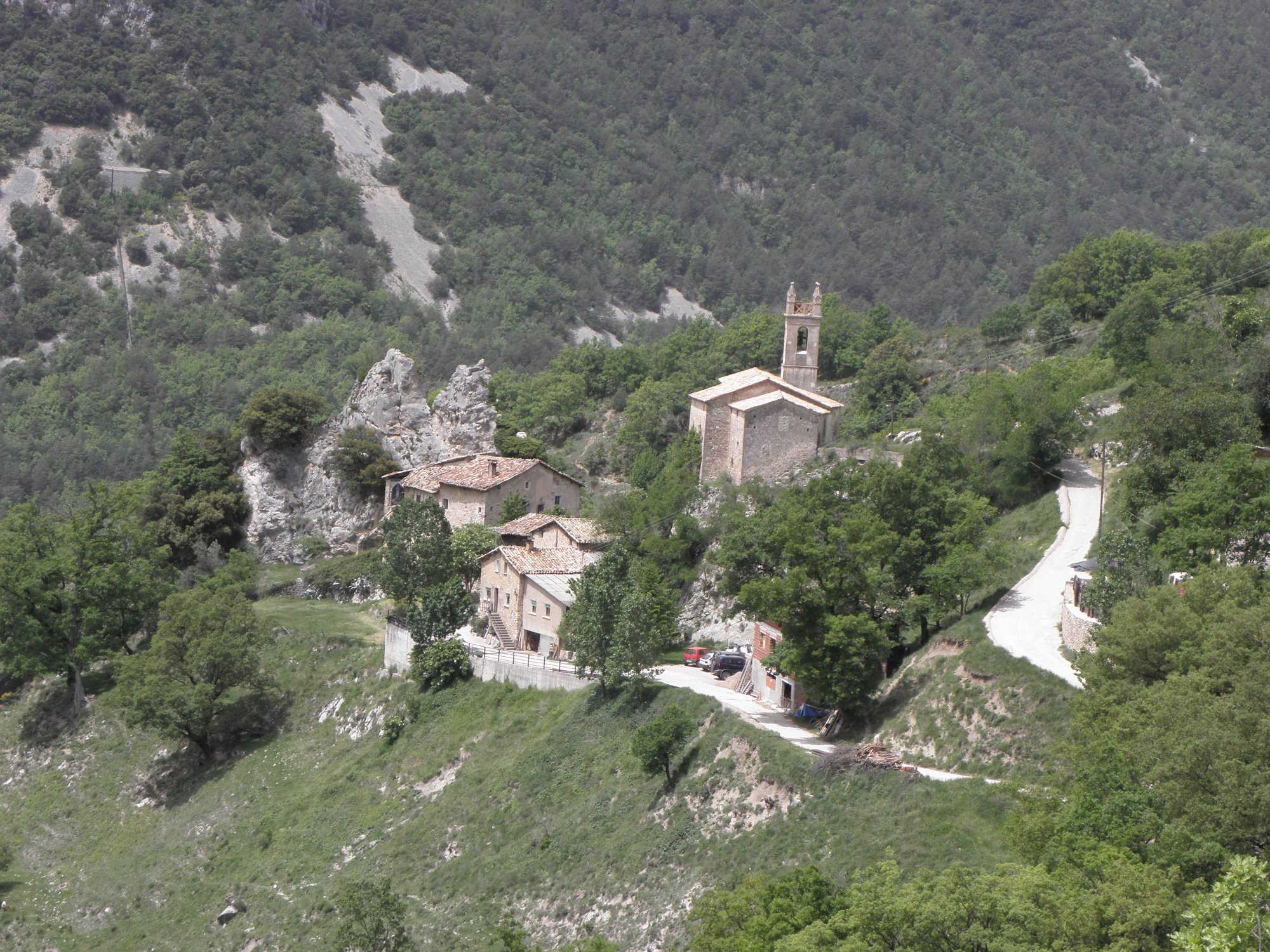

- Location within Province of Lleida Location within Catalonia Location within Spain
- Coordinates: 42°9′54″N 1°36′12″E
- Country: Spain
- Community: Catalonia
- Province: Lleida
- Municipality: La Coma i la Pedra
- Elevation: 988 m (3,241 ft)

Population
  - Total: 48

La Pedra is a locality located in the municipality of La Coma i la Pedra, in Province of Lleida province, Catalonia, Spain. As of 2020, it has a population of 48.

== Geography ==
La Pedra is located 145km northeast of Lleida.
