= La Llena (Lladurs) =

- Locality
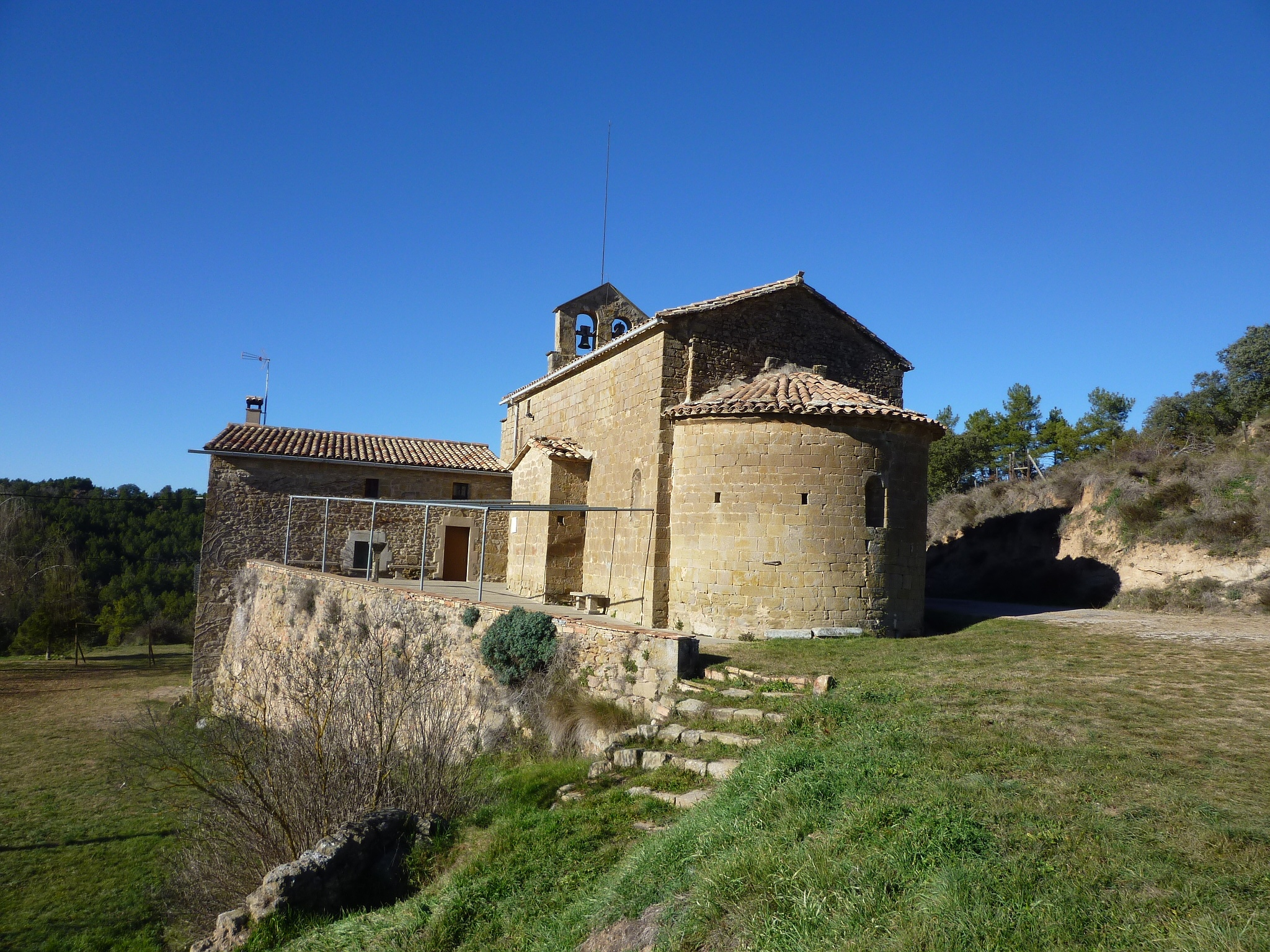

- Location within Province of Lleida Location within Catalonia Location within Spain
- Coordinates: 42°3′18″N 1°27′43″E
- Country: Spain
- Community: Catalonia
- Province: Lleida
- Municipality: Lladurs
- Elevation: 762 m (2,500 ft)

Population
  - Total: 16

La Llena is a hamlet located in the municipality of Lladurs, in Province of Lleida province, Catalonia, Spain. As of 2020, it has a population of 16.

== Geography ==
La Llena is located 119km east-northeast of Lleida.
