= Lladurs =

- Municipality
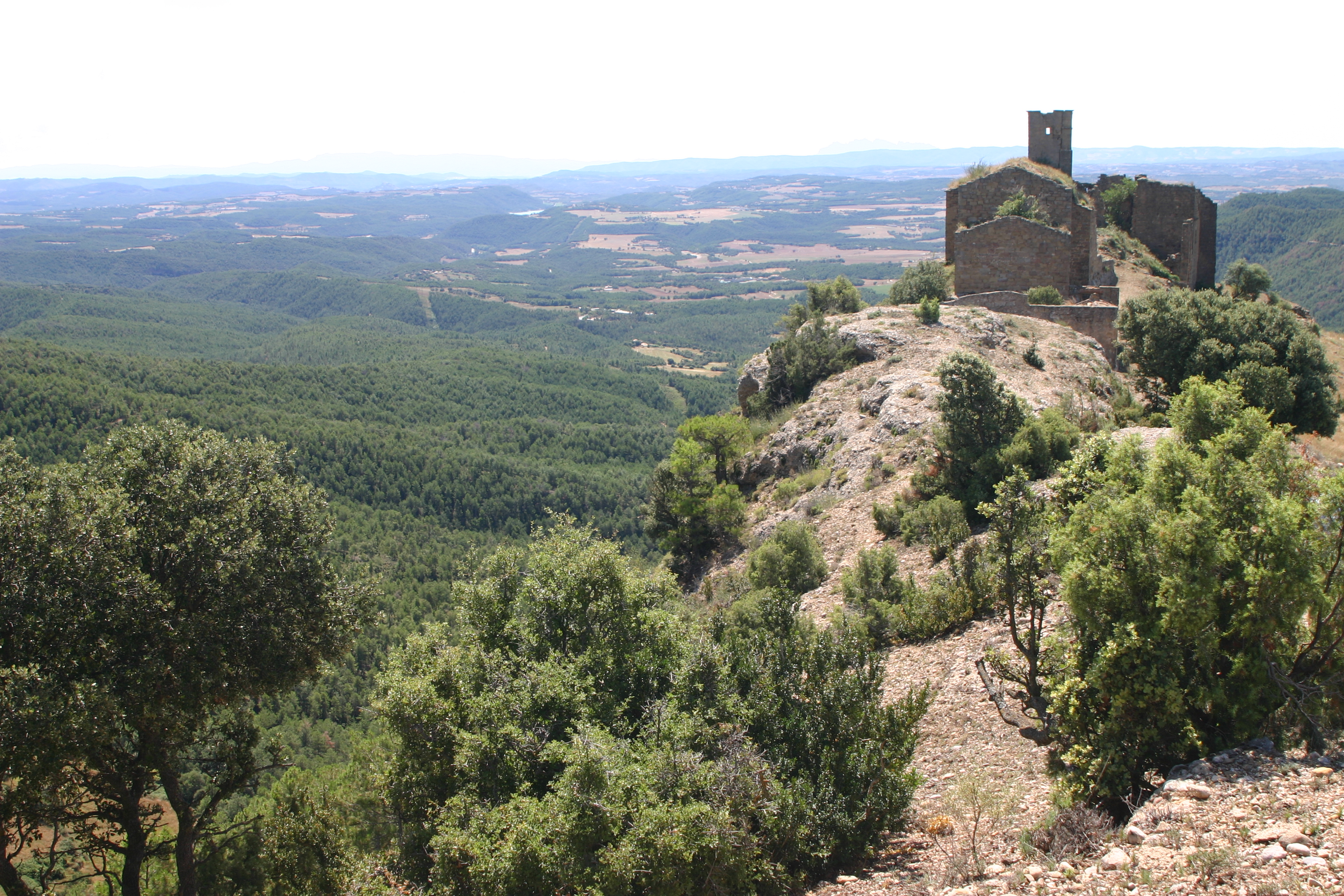
- Lladurs Castle

- Flag Coat of arms

- Location in Catalonia
- Coordinates: 42°2′48″N 1°30′28″E
- Country: Spain
- Community: Catalonia
- Province: Lleida
- Comarca: Solsonès

Government
  - Mayor: Joan Vilà Solé (2015)

Area
  - Total: 128.0 km^{2} (49.4 sq mi)
- Elevation: 834 m (2,736 ft)

Population (2025-01-01)
  - Total: 186
  - Density: 1.45/km^{2} (3.76/sq mi)
- Postal code: 25283
- Website: lladurs.cat

Lladurs (Catalan pronunciation: [ʎəˈðuɾs]) is a municipality in the comarca of the Solsonès in Catalonia, Spain. It has a population of 186 (register office, 2025).

== Villages ==
- Lladurs, 72
- La Llena, 18
- Montpol, 46
- El Pla dels Roures, 8
- Terrassola 18
- Timoneda, 22
- Els Torrents, 23
