= Els Torrents =

- Locality
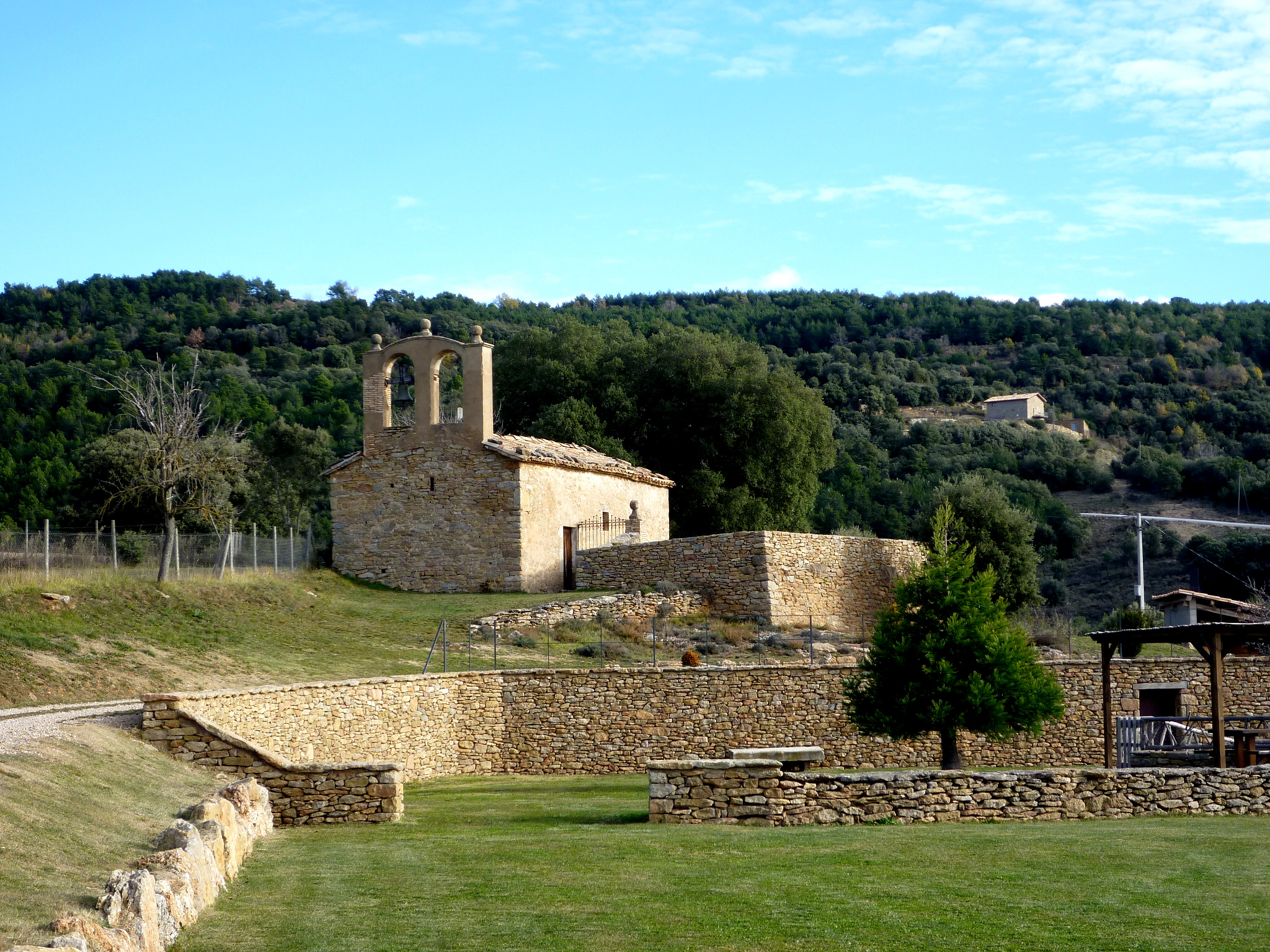

- Location within Province of Lleida Location within Catalonia Location within Spain
- Coordinates: 42°4′13″N 1°33′15″E
- Country: Spain
- Community: Catalonia
- Province: Lleida
- Municipality: Lladurs

Population
  - Total: 21

Els Torrents is a locality located in the municipality of Lladurs, in Province of Lleida province, Catalonia, Spain. As of 2020, it has a population of 21.

== Geography ==
Els Torrents is located 128km east-northeast of Lleida.
