= El Pla dels Roures =

- Locality
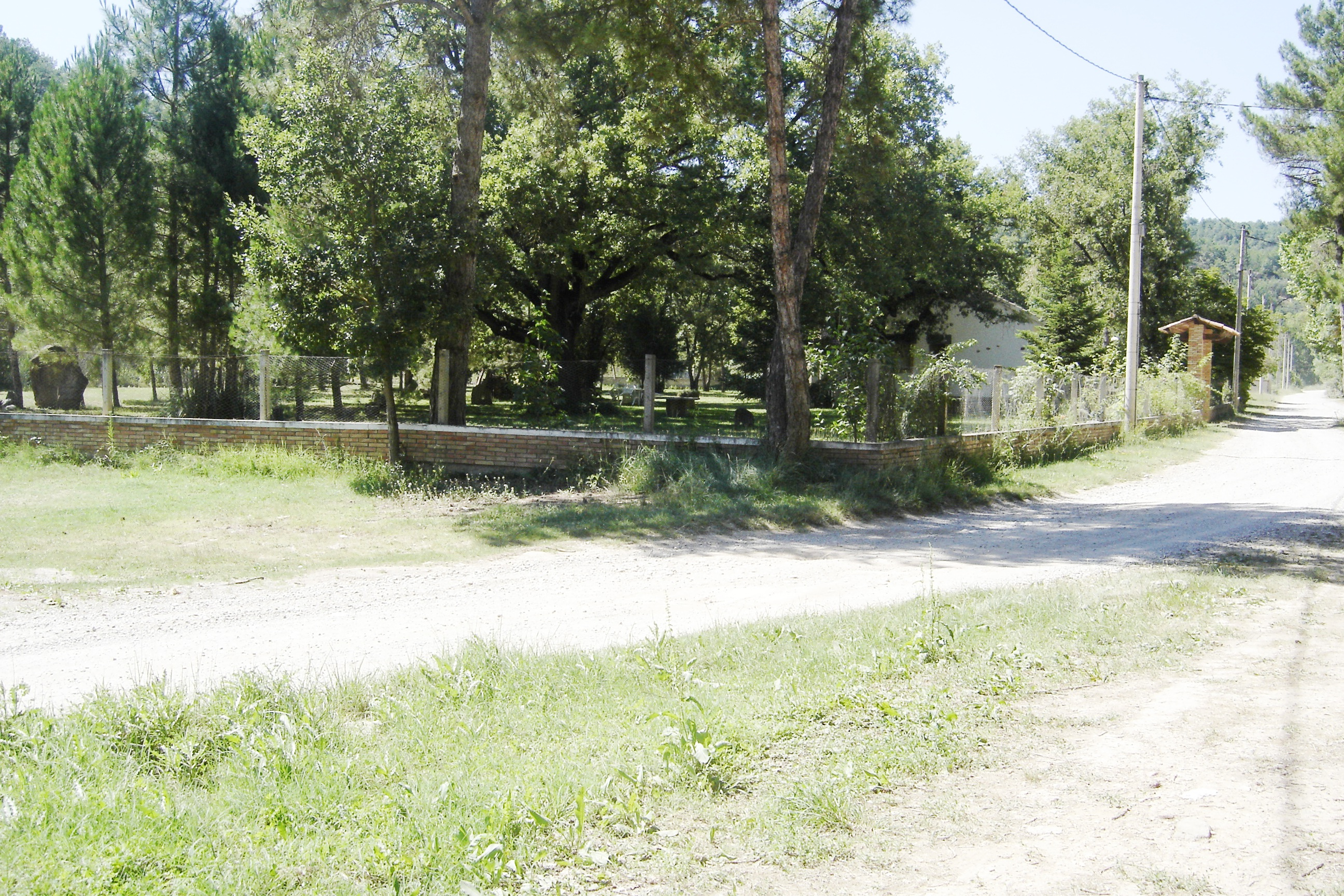

- Location within Province of Lleida Location within Catalonia Location within Spain
- Coordinates: 42°2′3″N 1°25′17″E
- Country: Spain
- Community: Catalonia
- Province: Lleida
- Municipality: Lladurs
- Elevation: 550 m (1,800 ft)

Population
  - Total: 8

El Pla dels Roures is a locality located in the municipality of Lladurs, in Province of Lleida province, Catalonia, Spain. As of 2020, it has a population of 8.

== Geography ==
El Pla dels Roures is located 101km east-northeast of Lleida.
