= Monestir de Sant Llorenç de Morunys =

Benedictine monastery in Sant Llorenç de Morunys Province of Lleida, Catalonia, Spain

Coordinates: 42.1375°N 1.591111°E

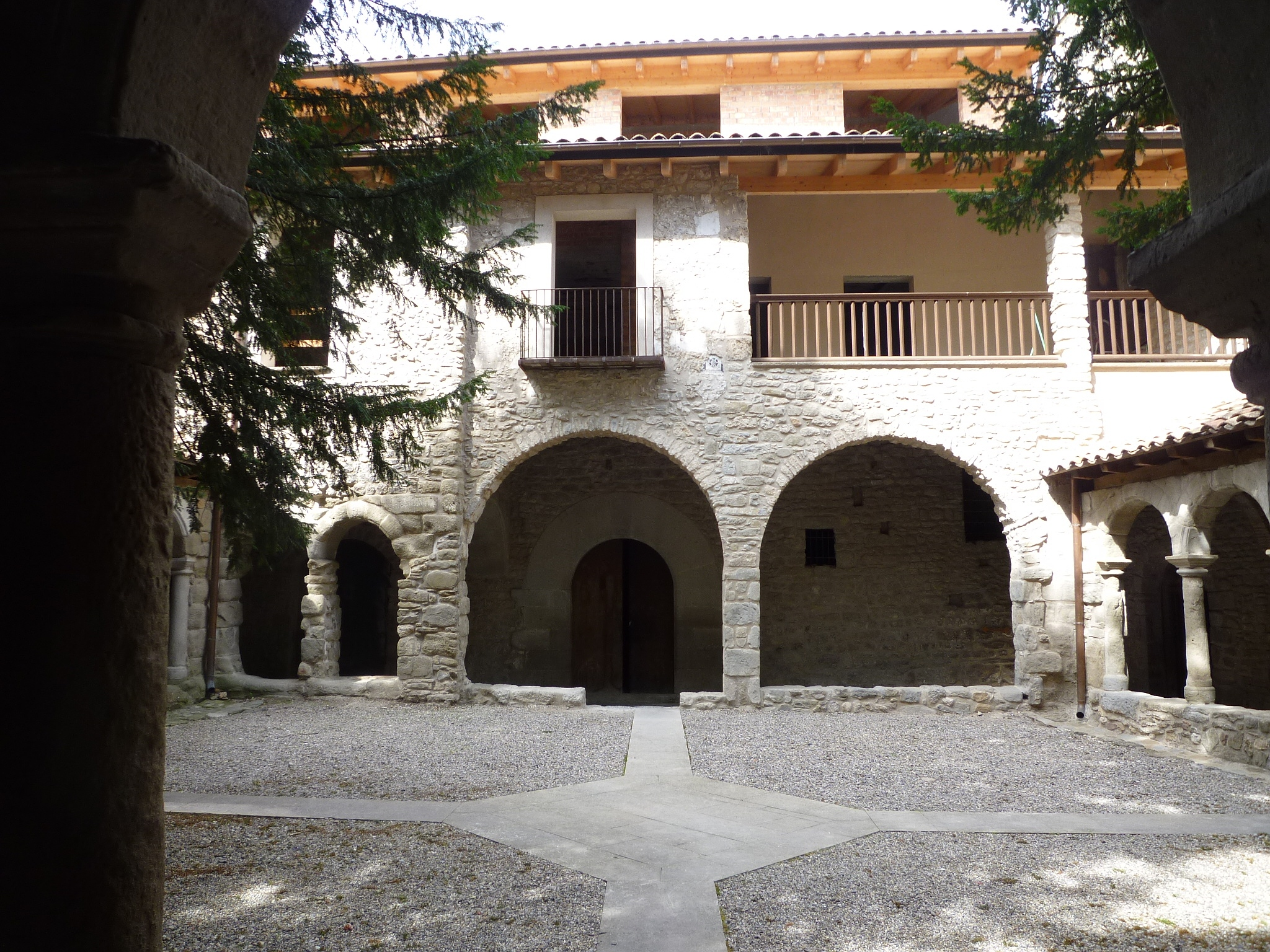
Sant Llorenç de Morunys

Sant Llorenç de Morunys is a Benedictine monastery in Sant Llorenç de Morunys Province of Lleida, Catalonia, Spain. It was declared a "Historic and Artistic Monument" in 1976.

There is known to be a community of clergy in the area since 885 and the first mention of a monastic house there was in 971.

By the end of the 13th century, the town of Sant Llorenç de Morunys was growing; however, in 1592 the monks moved to Santa Maria de Gerri and the following year the monastery became a church.

== Architecture and fittings ==
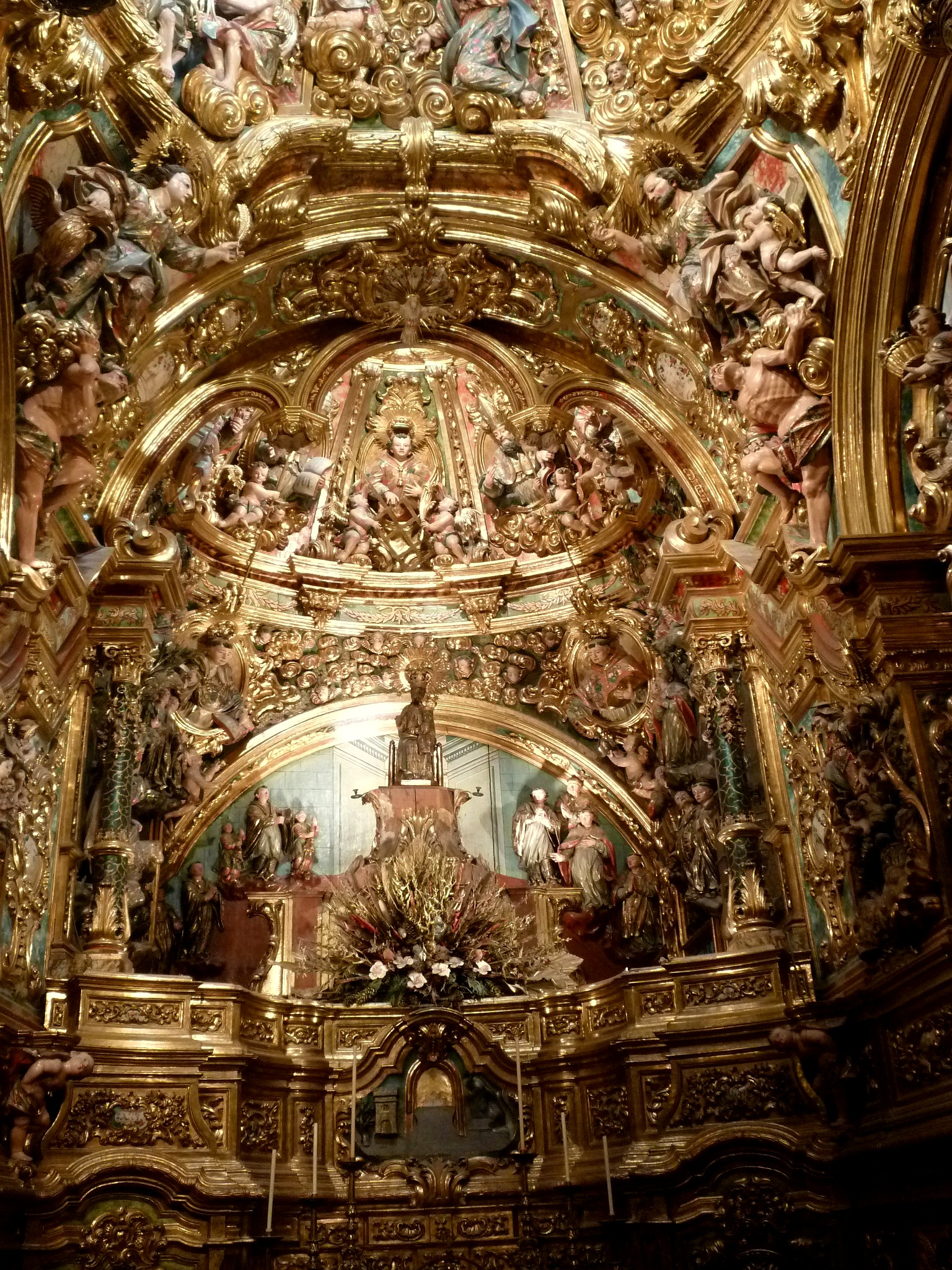
Interior view

The building is an example of First Romanesque-Lombard style of the 11th century, It is designed in the basilica plan with three naves. The nave is covered with a barrel vault. Under the apse was the main crypt, now in ruins. An extravagant baroque altar by Josep Pujol i Juhï is dedicated to the Mare de Deu dels Colls (Our Lady of the Mountain Passes). It occupies the entire chapel and is highly decorated with a profusion of images and representations, the highlight being Our Lady, a black virgin. It is considered one of the most representative works of Catalan Baroque. There are murals in the central apse and the dome is painted the 19th century. The Gothic L'Esperit Sant altarpiece by Lluís Borrassà dates to 1419. There are several other excellent Gothic altarpieces as well. The high altar, also in Baroque style, was designed by Joan Francesc Morató in the early 18th century and was partially destroyed during the Spanish Civil War. In the Romanesque door, there are Lombard arcades. The bell tower and cloister are in Renaissance style of the 16th century. The cloister, trapezoidal in shape, has two galleries with arches supported by smooth columns.

== Bibliography ==
- Tomo 18 (2004). La Gran Enciclopèdia en català. Barcelona, Edicions 62. ISBN 84-297-5446-6 (Catalán).
