= Llobera =

- Municipality
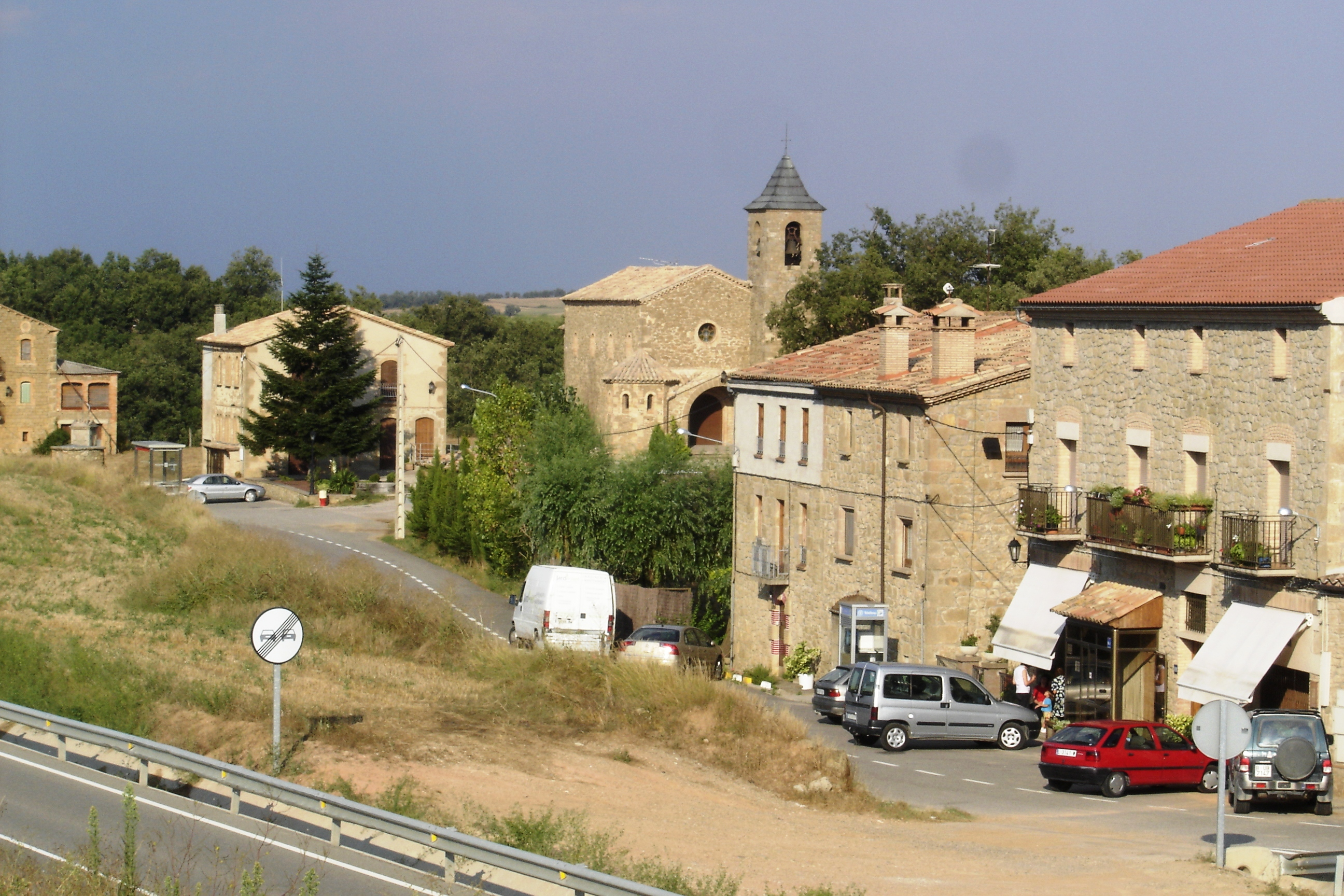
- L'Hostal Nou

- Flag Coat of arms

- Location in Catalonia
- Coordinates: 41°57′10″N 1°28′26″E
- Country: Spain
- Community: Catalonia
- Province: Lleida
- Comarca: Solsonès

Government
  - Mayor: Josep Colell Solé (2015)

Area
  - Total: 39.2 km^{2} (15.1 sq mi)

Population (2025-01-01)
  - Total: 201
  - Density: 5.13/km^{2} (13.3/sq mi)
- Website: llobera.cat

Llobera (Catalan pronunciation: [ʎuˈβeɾə]) is a village in the province of Lleida and autonomous community of Catalonia, Spain. It has a population of 201 (register office, 2025).
