= Castellar de la Ribera =

- Municipality
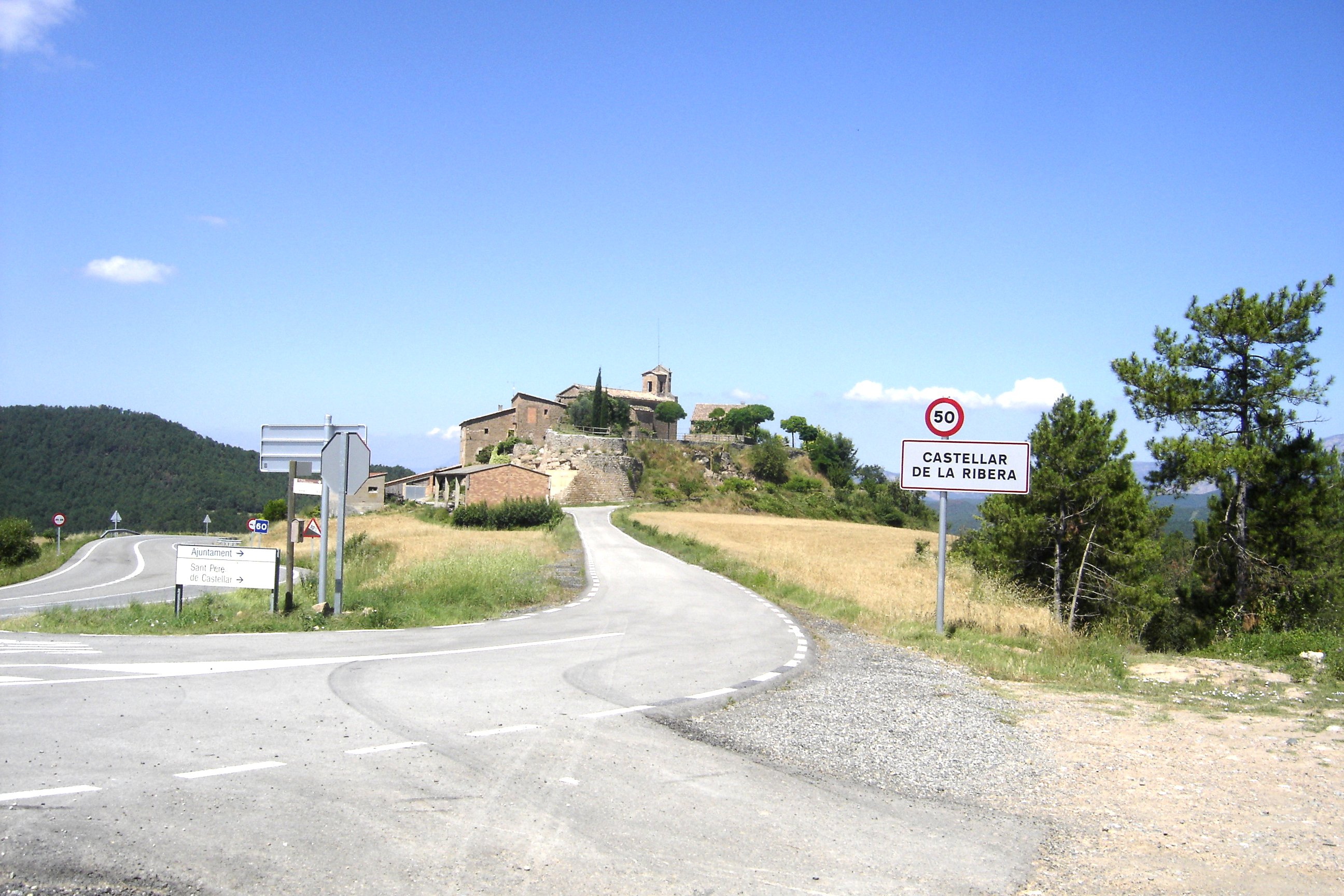

- Coat of arms

- Location in Catalonia
- Coordinates: 42.0235°N 1.4165°E
- Country: Spain
- Community: Catalonia
- Province: Lleida
- Comarca: Solsonès

Government
  - Mayor: M. Claustre Sunyer Cantons (2015)

Area
  - Total: 60.2 km^{2} (23.2 sq mi)
- Elevation: 657 m (2,156 ft)

Population (2025-01-01)
  - Total: 131
  - Density: 2.18/km^{2} (5.64/sq mi)
- Postal code: 25064
- Website: castellarribera.ddl.net

Castellar de la Ribera (Catalan pronunciation: [kəstəˈʎa ðə lə riˈβeɾə]) is a municipality in the comarca of the Solsonès in Catalonia, Spain. It is located in the valley of the Ribera Salada. It has a population of 131 (register office, 2025).
