= El Port del Comte =

- Locality
- Location within Province of Lleida Location within Catalonia Location within Spain
- Coordinates: 42°10′26″N 1°33′49″E
- Country: Spain
- Community: Catalonia
- Province: Lleida
- Municipality: La Coma i la Pedra
- Elevation: 1,704 m (5,591 ft)

Population
  - Total: 75

El Port del Comte is a locality located in the municipality of La Coma i la Pedra, in Province of Lleida province, Catalonia, Spain. As of 2020, it has a population of 75.

== Geography ==
El Port del Comte is located 140km northeast of Lleida.
