= La Molsosa =

- Municipality
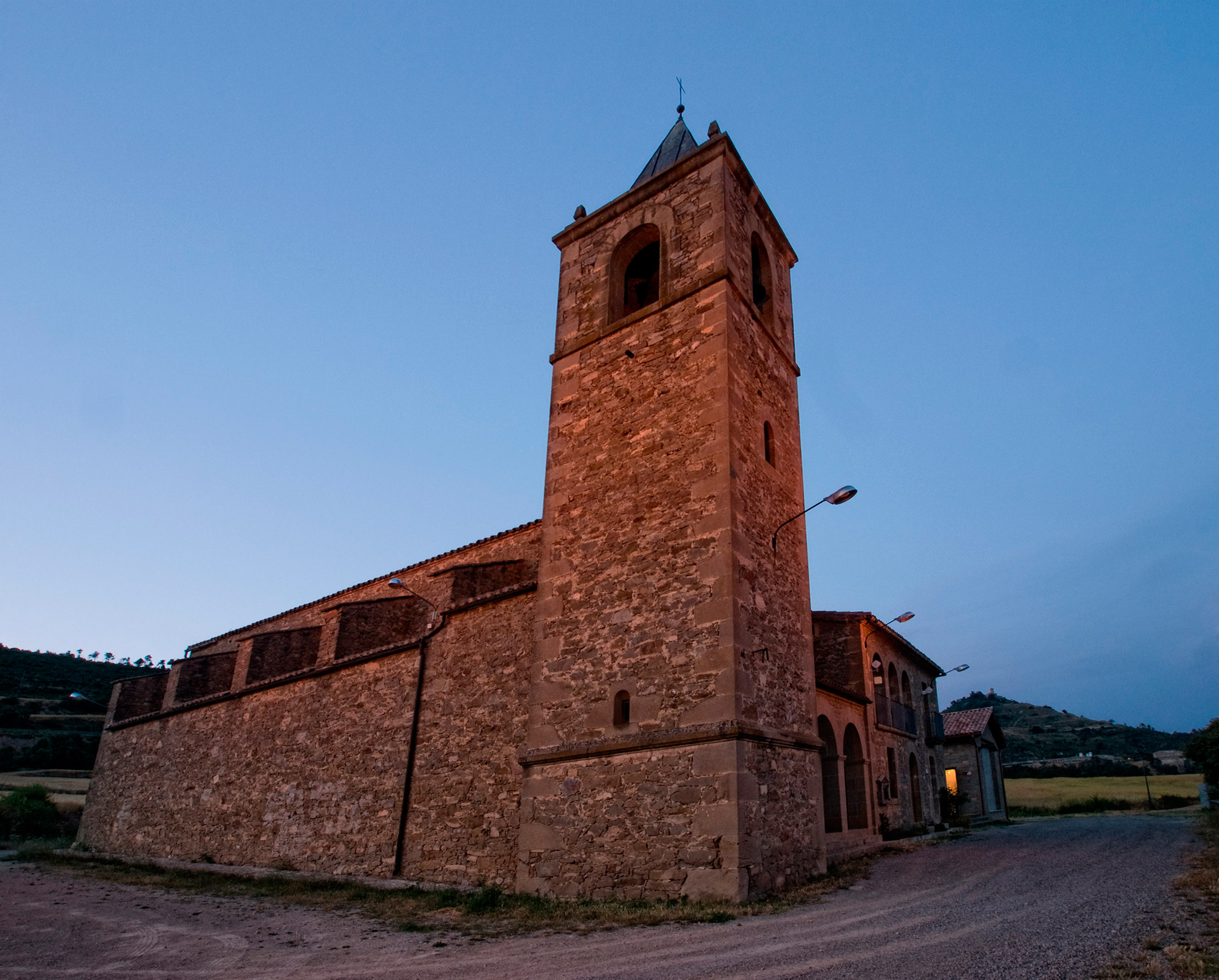
- St. Mary's church and the town hall

- Location in Catalonia
- Coordinates: 41°47′14″N 1°32′42″E
- Country: Spain
- Community: Catalonia
- Province: Lleida
- Comarca: Solsonès

Government
  - Mayor: Marià Torra Montraveta (2015)

Area
  - Total: 26.9 km^{2} (10.4 sq mi)
- Elevation: 700 m (2,300 ft)

Population (2025-01-01)
  - Total: 100
  - Density: 3.7/km^{2} (9.6/sq mi)
- Demonym(s): Molsosenc, molsosenca
- Website: molsosa.ddl.net

La Molsosa (Catalan pronunciation: [lə mulˈsozə]) is a municipality in the comarca of the Solsonès in Catalonia, Spain. It has a population of 100 (register office, 2025).

It is situated in the south of the comarca in the Castelltallat range. It is linked to Calaf by a local road. The municipality is split into two parts, the bigger eastern part having nearly all the population. La Molsosa became part of the Solsonès in the comarcal revision of 1990: previously it formed part of the Anoia.

== Population ==
1900	1930	1950	1970	1986	2007
204	298	263	176	135	128
