= Montpol =

- Locality
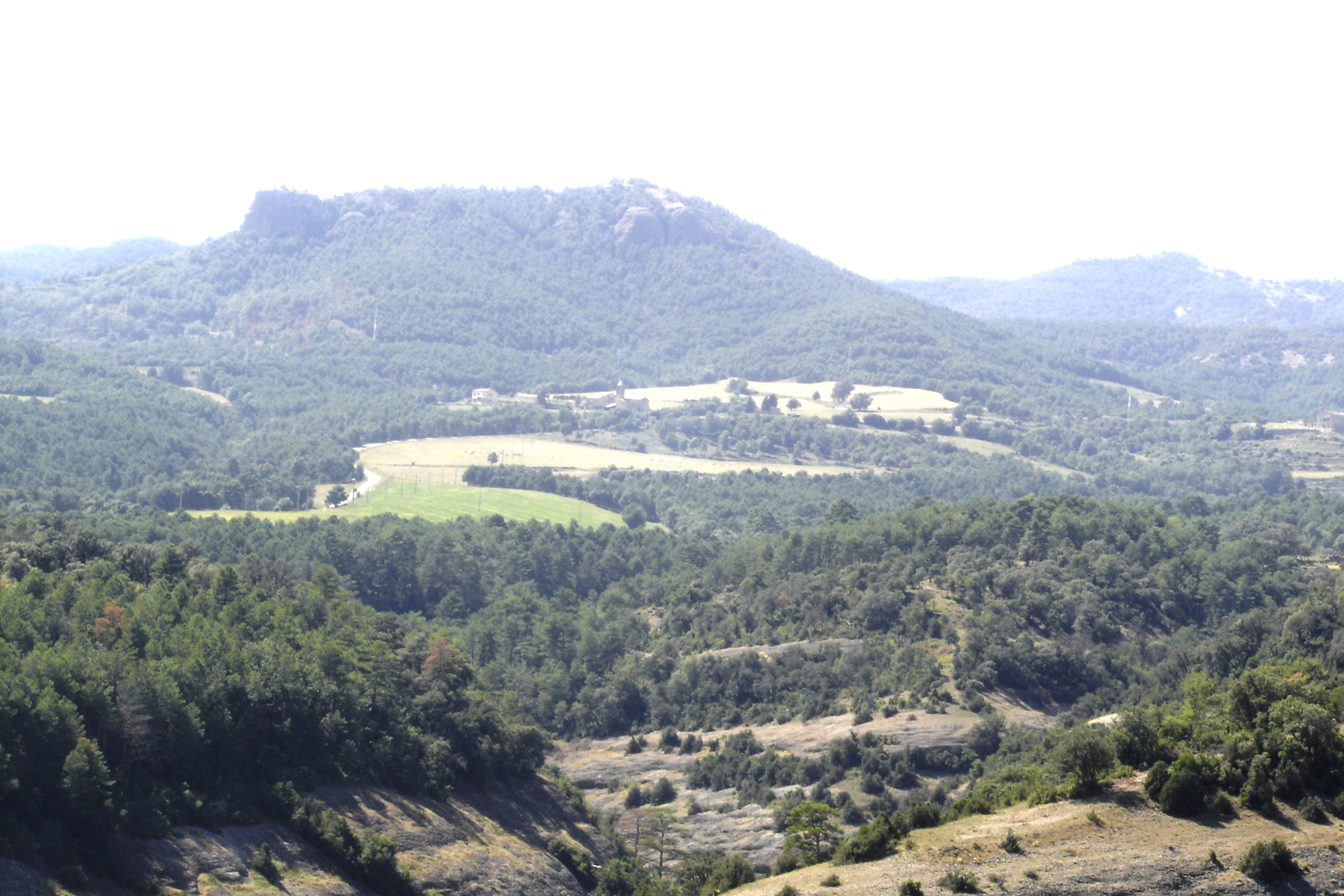

- Location within Province of Lleida Location within Catalonia Location within Spain
- Coordinates: 42°5′15″N 1°24′49″E
- Country: Spain
- Community: Catalonia
- Province: Lleida
- Municipality: Lladurs
- Elevation: 836 m (2,743 ft)

Population
  - Total: 37

Montpol is a locality located in the municipality of Lladurs, in Province of Lleida province, Catalonia, Spain. As of 2020, it has a population of 37.

== Geography ==
Montpol is located 108km northeast of Lleida.
