= Guixers =

- Municipality
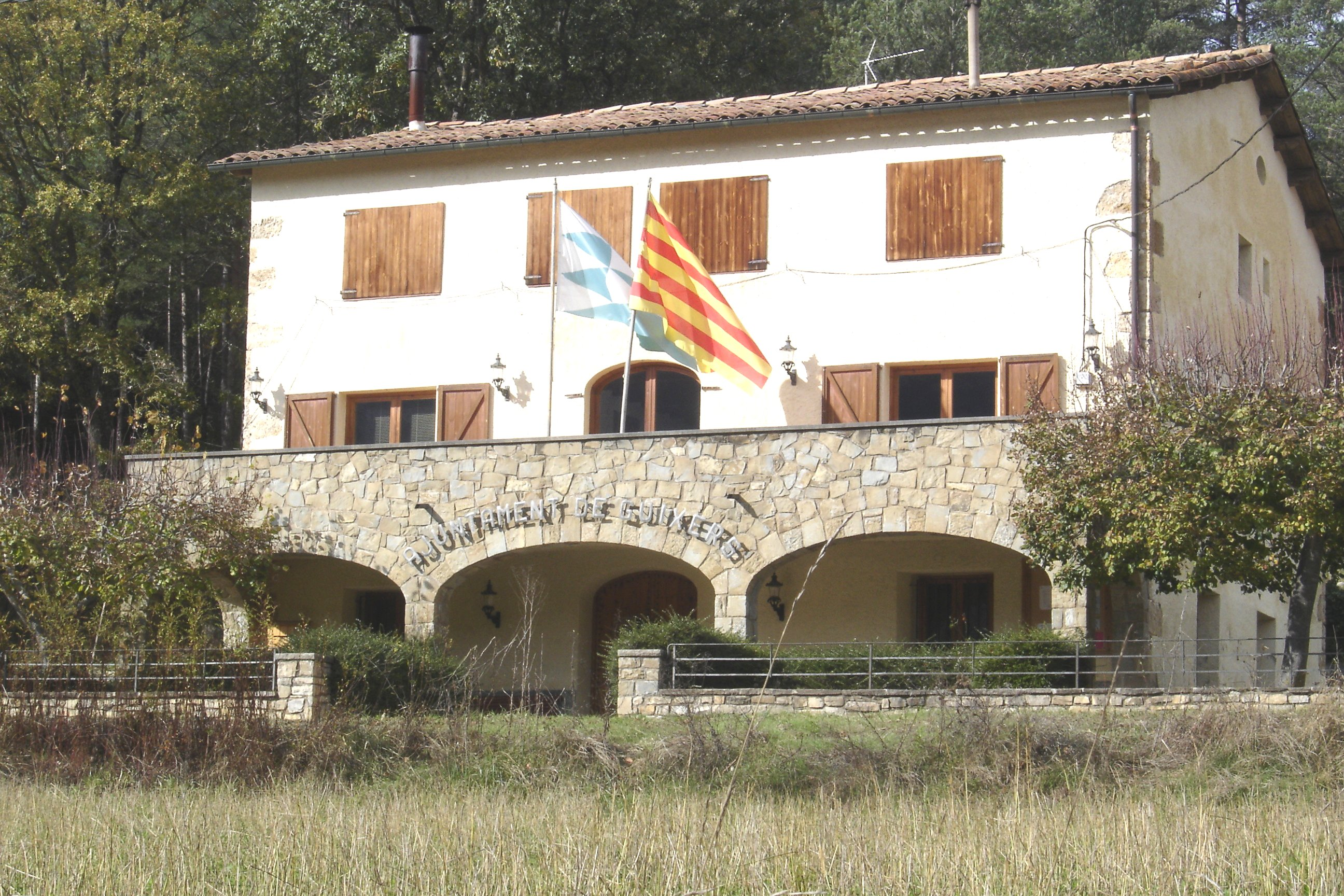
- Guixers town hall

- Flag Coat of arms

- Location in Catalonia
- Coordinates: 42.132°N 1.667°E
- Country: Spain
- Community: Catalonia
- Province: Lleida
- Comarca: Solsonès

Government
  - Mayor: Mariano Chaure Valls (2015)

Area
  - Total: 66.4 km^{2} (25.6 sq mi)
- Elevation: 750 m (2,460 ft)

Population (2025-01-01)
  - Total: 125
  - Density: 1.88/km^{2} (4.88/sq mi)
- Demonym(s): Guixarès, guixaresa
- Website: guixers.ddl.net

Guixers (Catalan pronunciation: [giˈʃes]) is a municipality in the province of Lleida, Catalonia in Spain. It has a population of 125 (register office, 2025).
