= Navès, Spain =

Navès
- Municipality
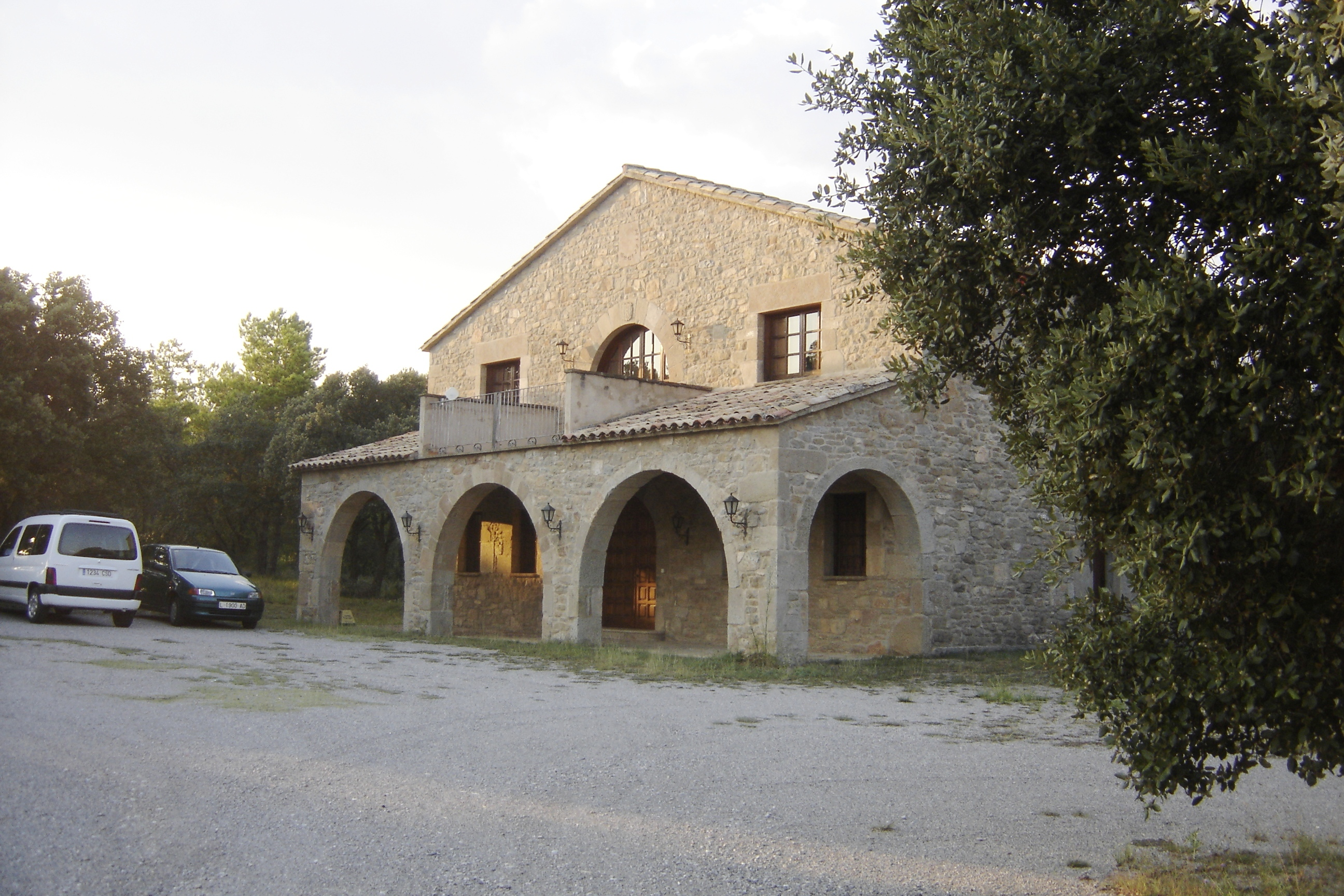
- Navès town hall

- Flag Coat of arms

- Location in Catalonia
- Coordinates: 41°59′34″N 1°38′26″E
- Country: Spain
- Community: Catalonia
- Province: Lleida
- Comarca: Solsonès

Government
  - Mayor: Josep M. Casafont Augé (2015)

Area
  - Total: 145.3 km^{2} (56.1 sq mi)
- Elevation: 900 m (3,000 ft)

Population (2025-01-01)
  - Total: 292
  - Density: 2.01/km^{2} (5.20/sq mi)
- Postal code: 25286
- Website: naves.cat

Navès (Catalan pronunciation: [nəˈβɛs]) is a municipality of the comarca of the Solsonès in the province of Lleida, Catalonia, Spain.

It has a population of 292 (register office, 2025).
