= Riner =

- Municipality
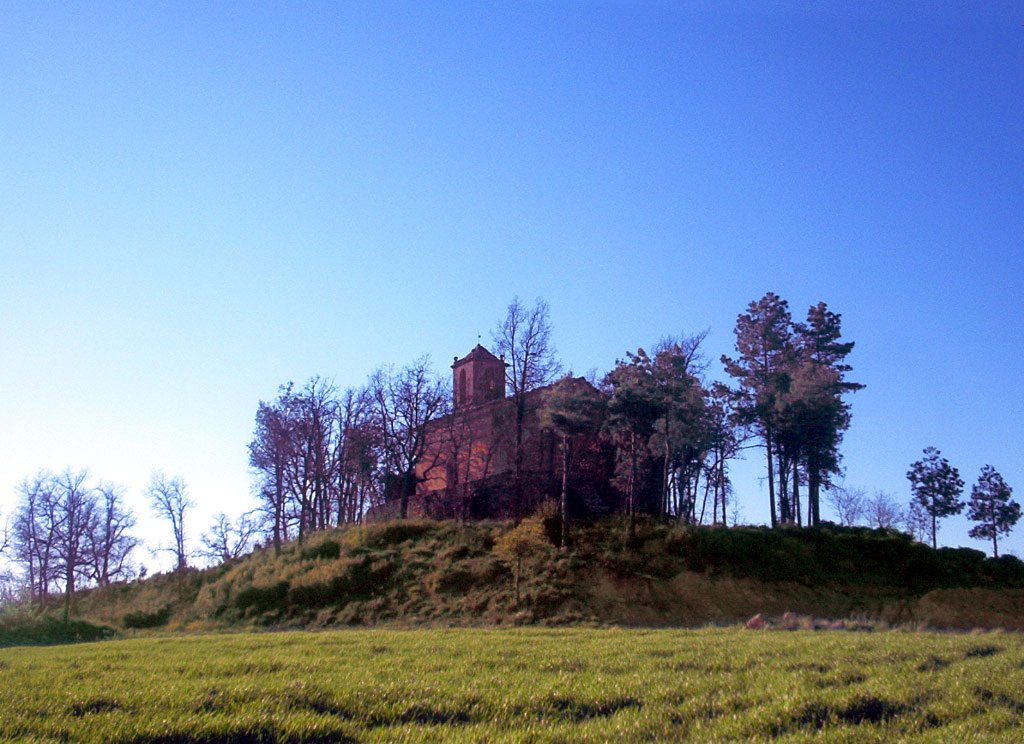
- Capella Sant Jaume dels Tracs

- Coat of arms

- Location in Catalonia
- Coordinates: 41°56′37″N 1°33′54″E
- Country: Spain
- Community: Catalonia
- Province: Lleida
- Comarca: Solsonès

Government
  - Mayor: Joan Solà Bosch (2015)

Area
  - Total: 47.1 km^{2} (18.2 sq mi)

Population (2025-01-01)
  - Total: 269
  - Density: 5.71/km^{2} (14.8/sq mi)
- Website: riner.ddl.net

For people with the surname, see Riner (surname).

Riner (Catalan pronunciation: [riˈne]) is a village in the province of Lleida and autonomous community of Catalonia, Spain. It has a population of 269 (register office, 2025).
