= Solsonès =

Coordinates: 41°58′47″N 1°30′47″E

- Comarca
- Country: Spain
- Autonomous community: Catalonia
- Province: Lleida
- Region: Central Catalonia
- Capital: Solsona
- Municipalities: List: Castellar de la Ribera, Clariana de Cardener, La Coma i la Pedra, Guixers, Lladurs, Llobera, La Molsosa, Navès, Odèn, Olius, Pinell de Solsonès, Pinós, Riner, Sant Llorenç de Morunys, Solsona

Government
  - Body: Solsonès Comarcal Council
  - President: Benjamí Puig (ERC) (2023-2025); Claustre Sunyer (Junts) (2025-2027)

Area
  - Total: 1,001.1 km^{2} (386.5 sq mi)

Population (2014)
  - Total: 13,497
  - Density: 13.482/km^{2} (34.919/sq mi)
- Demonym: Solsonencs
- Time zone: UTC+1 (CET)
  - Summer (DST): UTC+2 (CEST)
- Largest municipality: Solsona
- Website: www.elsolsones.cat

Solsonès (Eastern Catalan: [sulsuˈnɛs], Western Catalan: [solsoˈnes]) is a comarca (county) in the central region of Catalonia (Spain). It is part of historic county of Urgell. Over 60% of its inhabitants live in the capital, Solsona.

== Municipalities ==
Municipality	Population (2014)	Area km^{2}
Castellar de la Ribera	149	60.2
Clariana de Cardener	140	40.8
La Coma i la Pedra	269	60.6
Guixers	128	66.4
Lladurs	195	128.0
Llobera	201	39.2
La Molsosa	116	26.9
Navès	280	145.3
Odèn	267	114.4
Olius	902	54.8
Pinell de Solsonès	207	91.1
Pinós	302	104.3
Riner	281	47.1
Sant Llorenç de Morunys	993	4.3
Solsona	9,067	17.7
• Total: 15	13,497	1,001.1
