= Vinaixa =

- Municipality
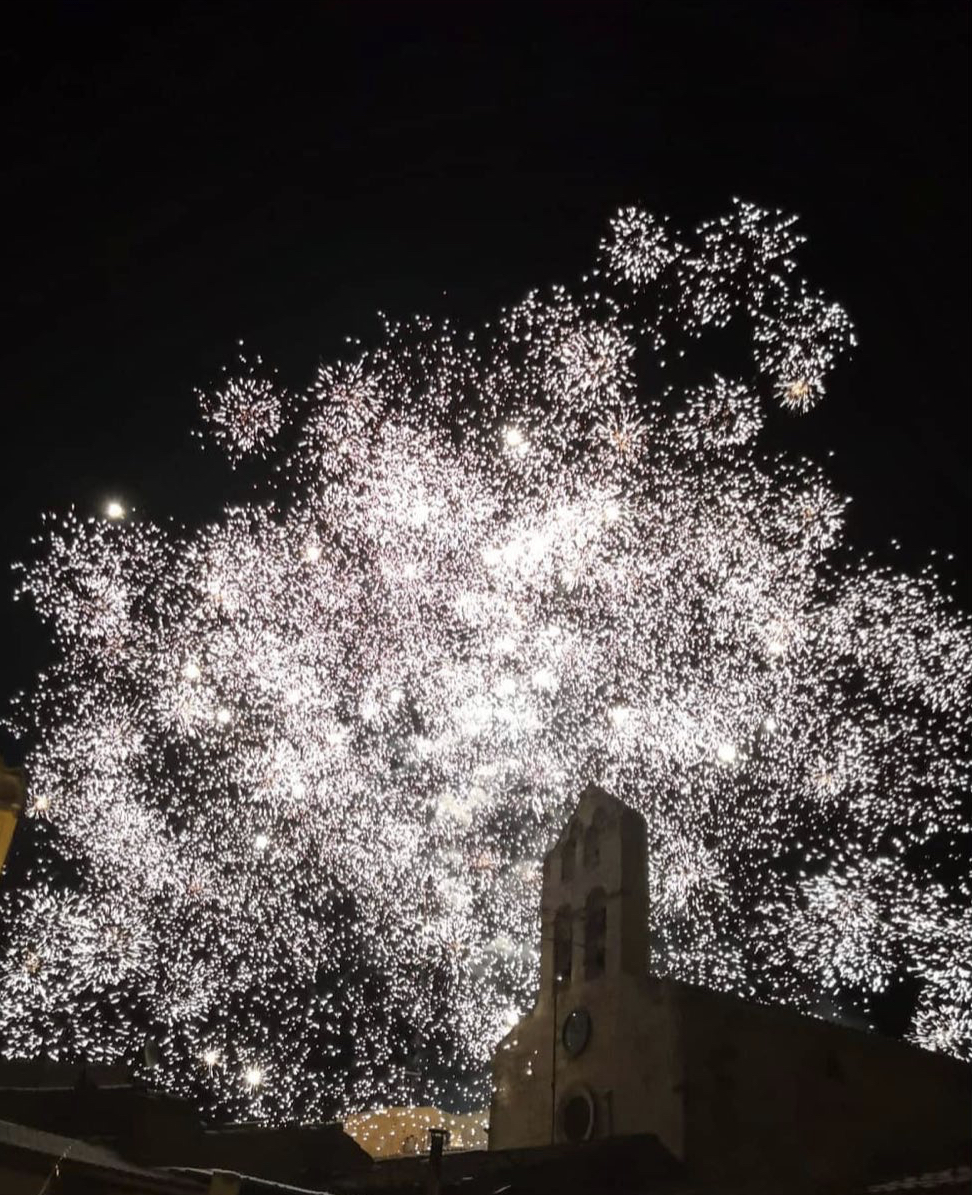
- Fireworks outside the church of St. John the Baptist

- Coat of arms

- Location in Province of Lleida Location in Catalonia Location in Spain
- Coordinates: 41°25′49″N 0°58′34″E
- Country: Spain
- Community: Catalonia
- Province: Lleida
- Comarca: Les Garrigues

Government
  - Mayor: Josep Maria Tarragó Clivillé (2019)

Area
  - Total: 37.6 km^{2} (14.5 sq mi)
- Elevation: 479 m (1,572 ft)

Population (2025-01-01)
  - Total: 437
  - Density: 11.6/km^{2} (30.1/sq mi)
- Demonym: Vinaixenc
- Postal code: 25440
- Website: vinaixa.cat

Vinaixa (Catalan pronunciation: [biˈnajʃa]) is a municipality in the region of Les Garrigues, in the province of Lleida, Catalonia, Spain. It has a population of 437 (register office, 2025).

The town centre is arranged around the old castle and in the appearance of the buildings stone predominates. It has a hunting ground and the stone industry has been the main economic activity for many years. In its municipality, there are numerous pine forests.

The main attraction is the church of St. John the Baptist, in Romanesque-Cistercian style. It houses several Romanesque paintings and a Gothic retable.

== Geography ==
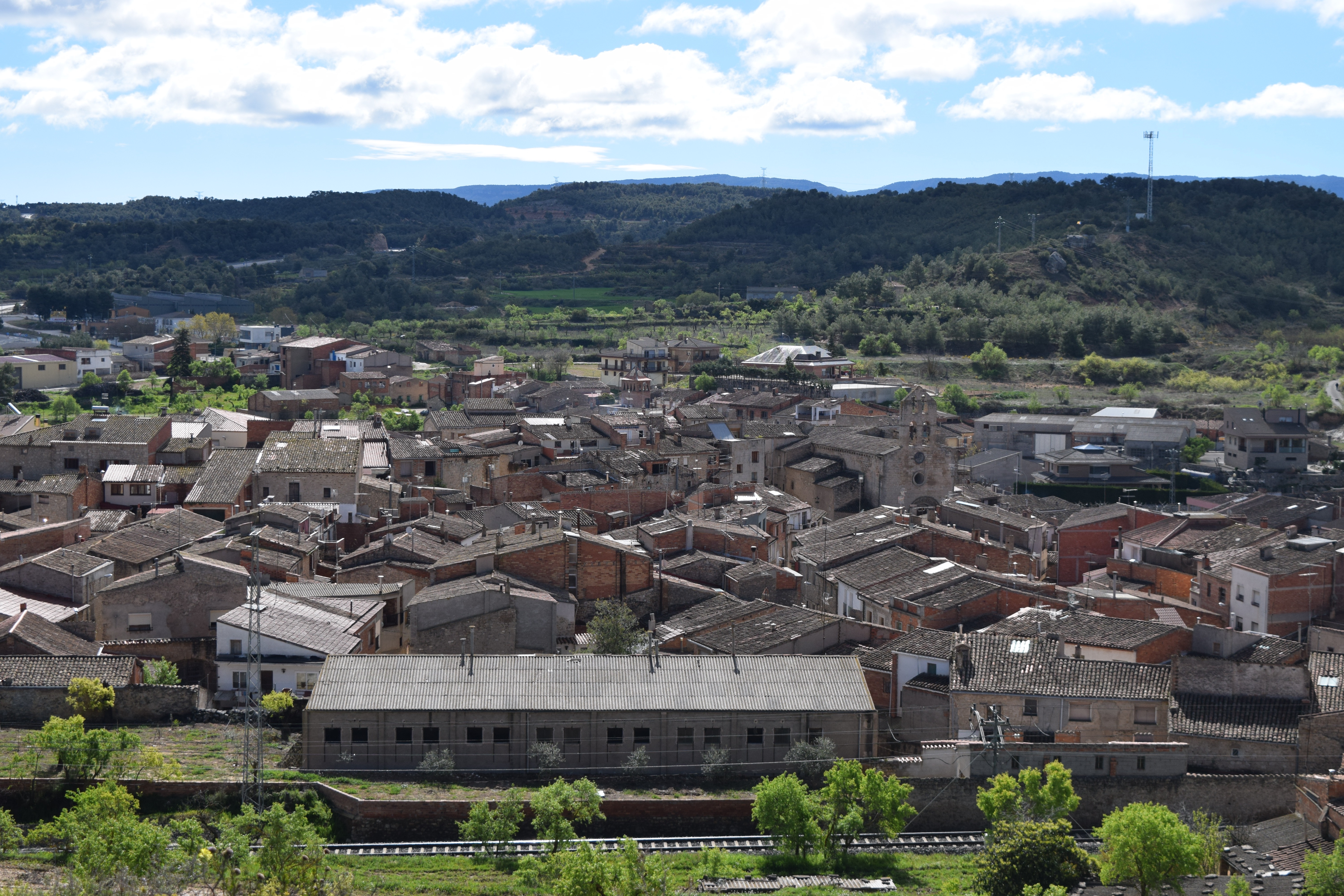
Vinaixa sight

Vinaixa is a municipality located in the south-eastern sector of the region of Les Garrigues, in a high area, on the border with the Conca de Barberà, and in the line of historical communications of the coast with the interior. The term has an area of 37.59 square kilometre and extends in the shape of a rectangle. It borders Vimbodí i Poblet, Vallclara, El Vilosell, L'Albi, Les Borges Blanques, La Floresta, Els Omellons, L'Espluga Calba, Fulleda and Tarrés. The population centre is in the southern half of the term, 480.90 meters at the level of the sea.

It can be accessed by the N-240 road and also by the AP-2 motorway. It is 40km far from Lleida, 132km far from Barcelona and 500km far from Madrid. It has connections, through local roads and fixed roads, with neighbouring villages. There is a railway station (Lleida - Barcelona | Barcelona - Lleida) and a bus stop (Lleida - Tarragona | Tarragona - Lleida).

The municipality is based on land of Oligocene origin. Several mountain ranges cross the term from north to south, which facilitate the existence of depressions. The highest points of the term are Punta del Puig (570 meters), to the north, and Punta dels Ràfols (675 meters), to the east.

The climate is the continental Mediterranean, typical of the Ebro Depression.

== History ==
The municipality core of Vinaixa emerged in the 8th century, from an Arab enclave around a castle. In the 12th century, the village was called Avinasha (from Arabic, Ibn Aisa 'son of Aixa'). The Castle of Vinaixa (Cal Tarragó) is located at the highest point of the village (482 metres). It is an ancient Arab guistan with castle honours, around which the village of Beni-Aixa was ordered, from which the municipality of Vinaixa takes its name, and refers to the family that owns the property and lands of the area in the Arab era. Currently, it is privately owned.

With the advance of the Christians, the nucleus was resettled by Ramon Berenguer IV, who granted settlement charters in the 12th century to the people of Tàrrega. Berenguer de Puigverd granted several instruments in favour of the Poblet Abbey which in the 13th century acquired total jurisdiction.

The hermitage of Sant Bonifaci is located 6.5 km from the urban centre. It is dedicated to Saint Boniface, to whom Vinaixa professes devotion. It appears that the hermitage was already built in the 14th century, but did not possess the saint's relic until May 1682.

== Main sights ==
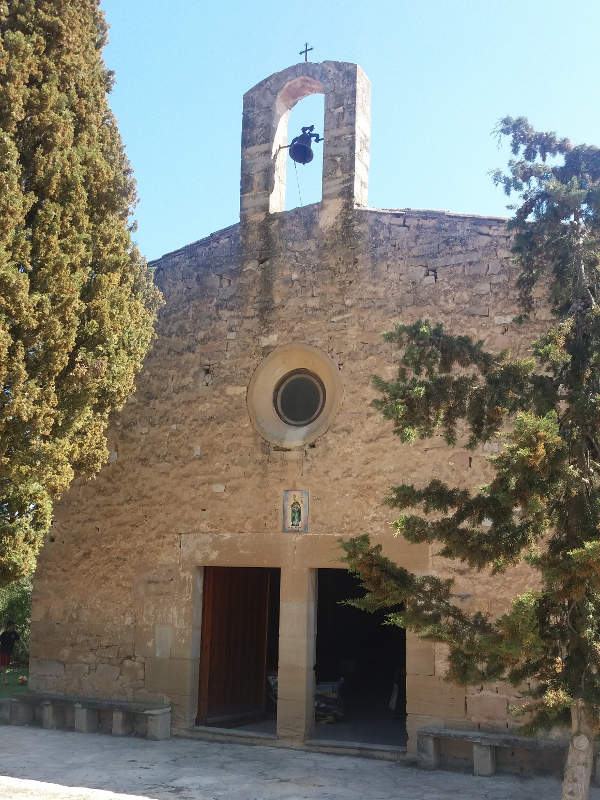
Hermitage of Saint Boniface

- Casa de Poblet (or Cal Panxa). House where tithes were collected, built by Abbot Copons (1316-1348). Former property of the monks of the Poblet Abbey, it is currently municipal property.
- Cal Blanco. House built during the Second Spanish Republic, has modernist reminiscences.
- Casa Tarragó. House of an important family in the town, of which only the staircase and the façade of the stately palace that it was remains. It had its oil mill at the bottom of the building.
- Hermitage of Saint Boniface. It is of a Gothic structure and was later reformed. It seems that in the fourteenth century it was already built. Located 6.5 km from the urban area.
- Saint John the Baptist Church. Built between 1301 and 1318, it belongs to the period of transition from Romanesque to Gothic, with strong Cistercian influences. It has a single central nave and side chapels. The portal, the most notable element, is made up of three decaying archivolts that present a type of ornamentation with diamond tips. The capitals have plant motifs and it has a belfry bell tower with four bells. It still retains some Romanesque paintings, which have earned it the title of Historic-Artistic Monument. The Gothic style altarpiece stands out.
- Portal del Forn. One of the four portals that closed off the town, where there was the Vinaixa oven during medieval times.
