= Arbeca =

- Municipality
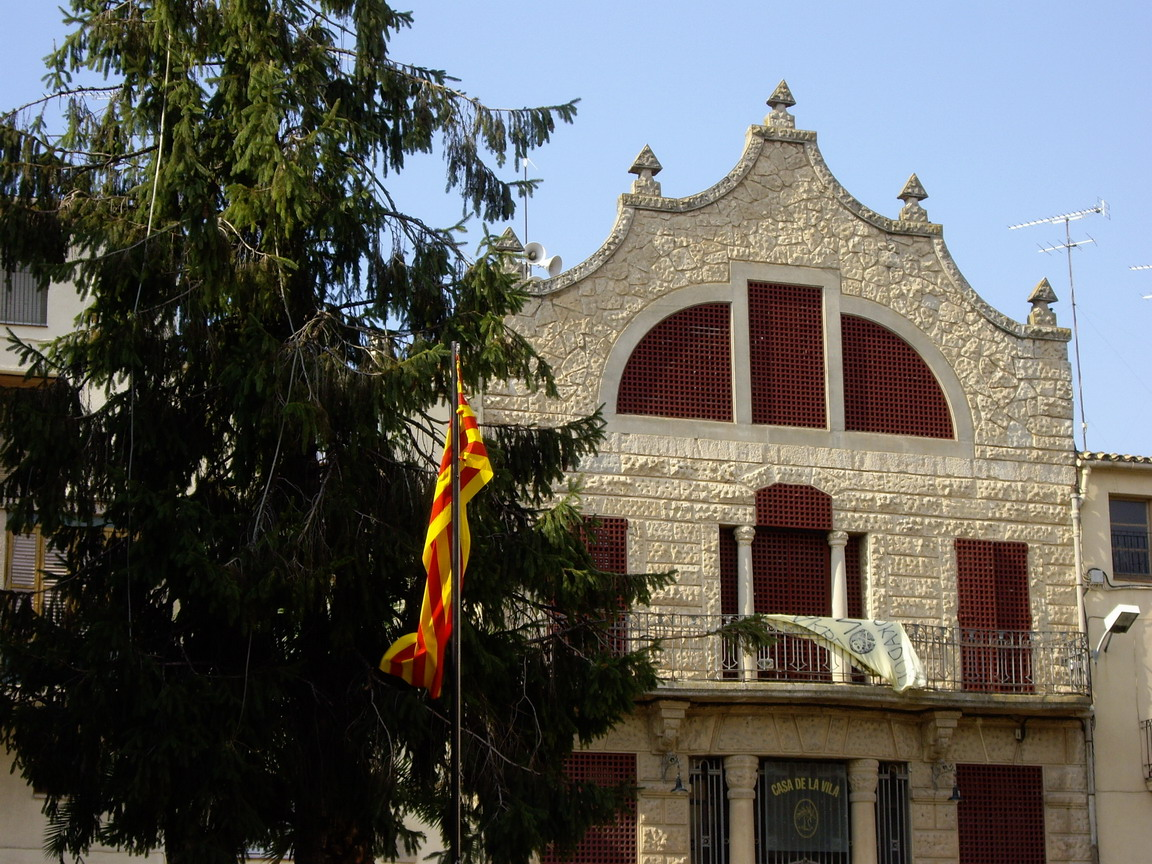
- Arbeca town hall

- Flag Coat of arms

- Location in Catalonia Arbeca (Catalonia) Arbeca (Spain)
- Coordinates: 41.541°N 0.924°E
- Country: Spain
- Community: Catalonia
- Province: Lleida
- Comarca: Garrigues

Government
  - Mayor: Sergi Pelegrí

Area
  - Total: 58.3 km^{2} (22.5 sq mi)
- Elevation: 332 m (1,089 ft)

Population (2025-01-01)
  - Total: 2,163
  - Density: 37.1/km^{2} (96.1/sq mi)
- Website: www.arbeca.cat

Arbeca (Catalan pronunciation: [aɾˈβeka]) is a village in the comarca of Les Garrigues, in the province of Lleida, in Catalonia, Spain.

It is the third village of Les Garrigues in number of inhabitants, close to Les Borges Blanques and Juneda. The population is 2,163 (register office, 2025) and the village has given its name to arbequina olives, used to produce a highly valued olive oil for human consumption, grown not only in Les Garrigues but also in many places in Spain, such as Andalusia. The economy of the village is basically agrarian, with the cultivation on its irrigated and unirrigated land of almonds, cereals, pears, apples, olives, peaches, etc.

Arbeca is situated in the north-northeast of Les Garrigues, near the comarques of Pla d'Urgell and Urgell, and about 30 kilometers from Lleida, the capital of the province of the same name.
