= Garrigues (comarca) =

Coordinates: 41°31′N 0°52′E

- Comarca
- Flag Coat of arms

- Location of Les Garrigues (in blue) within Catalonia
- Country: Spain
- Autonomous community: Catalonia
- Region: Ponent
- Province: Lleida
- Capital: Les Borges Blanques
- Municipalities: List: L'Albagés, L'Albi, Arbeca, Bellaguarda, Les Borges Blanques, Bovera, Castelldans, Cervià de les Garrigues, El Cogul, L'Espluga Calba, La Floresta, Fulleda, La Granadella, Granyena de les Garrigues, Juncosa, Juneda, Els Omellons, La Pobla de Cérvoles, Puiggròs, El Soleràs, Tarrés, Els Torms, El Vilosell, Vinaixa

Government
  - Body: Garrigues Comarcal Council
  - President: Antoni Villas (Junts)

Area
  - Total: 797.7 km^{2} (308.0 sq mi)

Population (2014)
  - Total: 19,762
  - Density: 24.77/km^{2} (64.16/sq mi)
- Demonym: Garriguenc / Garriguenca
- Time zone: UTC+1 (CET)
  - Summer (DST): UTC+2 (CEST)
- Largest municipality: Les Borges Blanques
- Website: https://ccgarrigues.com/

Garrigues (Western Catalan: [ɡaˈriɣes]) is a comarca (county) in Ponent, Catalonia, Spain. Its capital is Les Borges Blanques. Its symbol (on the flag and shield in the right panel) is an olive branch, Garrigues being the center of olive cultivation (most of it without the necessity of irrigation) in all of Catalonia.

== History ==
The cave paintings at Roca dels Moros, El Cogul, are the most important vestiges of prehistoric settlement in Garrigues. A Neolithic tomb has been found at Les Borges Blanques. During the Iberian era, the comarca was settled by the Ilergetians. There is documentation also for Roman summer residences and country villas, particularly in the north, but the Roman influence died out soon after.

== Municipalities ==
Municipality	Population (2014)	Area km^{2}
L'Albagés	419	25.7
L'Albi	834	32.5
Arbeca	2,389	58.3
Bellaguarda	307	17.1
Les Borges Blanques	6,088	61.6
Bovera	290	31.1
Castelldans	976	65.1
Cervià de les Garrigues	708	34.2
El Cogul	190	17.5
L'Espluga Calba	395	21.5
La Floresta	162	5.5
Fulleda	98	16.2
La Granadella	715	88.7
Granyena de les Garrigues	162	20.5
Juncosa	438	76.5
Juneda	3,497	47.3
Els Omellons	232	11.1
La Pobla de Cérvoles	220	61.9
Puiggròs	296	9.9
El Soleràs	359	12.2
Tarrés	105	13.0
Els Torms	148	13.8
El Vilosell	188	18.9
Vinaixa	546	37.6
• Total: 24	19,762	797.7
