= La Granadella =

- Municipality
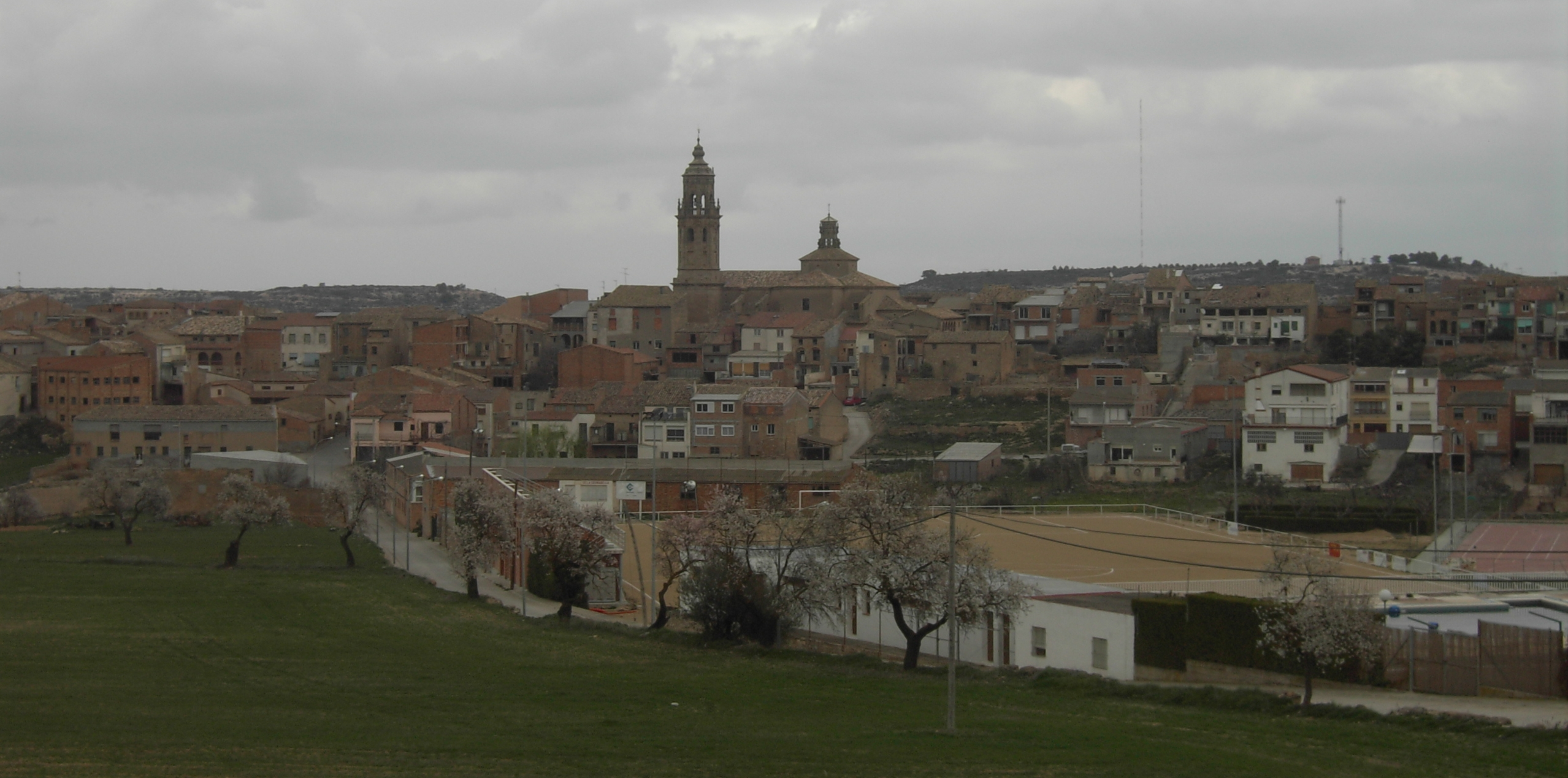
- View of La Granadella, Catalonia.

- Flag Coat of arms

- Location in Catalonia La Granadella (Spain)
- Coordinates: 41°21′25″N 0°39′59″E
- Autonomous Community: Catalonia
- Province: Lleida
- Comarca: Les Garrigues

Government
  - Mayor: Carlos Gibert Bernaus (2015)

Area
  - Total: 88.7 km^{2} (34.2 sq mi)
- Elevation: 528 m (1,732 ft)

Population (2025-01-01)
  - Total: 748
  - Density: 8.43/km^{2} (21.8/sq mi)
- Time zone: UTC+1 (CET)
  - Summer (DST): UTC+2 (CEST)
- Postcode: 25101
- Calling code: +34 (Spain)
- Website: www.lagranadella.cat

La Granadella (Catalan pronunciation: [la ɣɾanaˈðeʎɛ]) is a Spanish town (municipi) in the autonomous community of Catalonia. It is situated in the county of Garrigues, in the province of Lleida. It has a population of 748 (register office, 2025).

== Description ==
The municipality covers an area of 89 km² (34 sq mi). As of 2006, it is twinned with the town of Pézilla-la-Rivière in the Pyrénées-Orientales department of France.

Its principal economic activity is agriculture, especially in growing olives, almonds and cereals. It secondary economic activity is processing these crops, especially in making olive oil.

It contains a primary school and a small secondary school.

Its baroque 18th-century parish church is dedicated to Saint Mary of Grace.
