= La Pobla de Cérvoles =

- Municipality
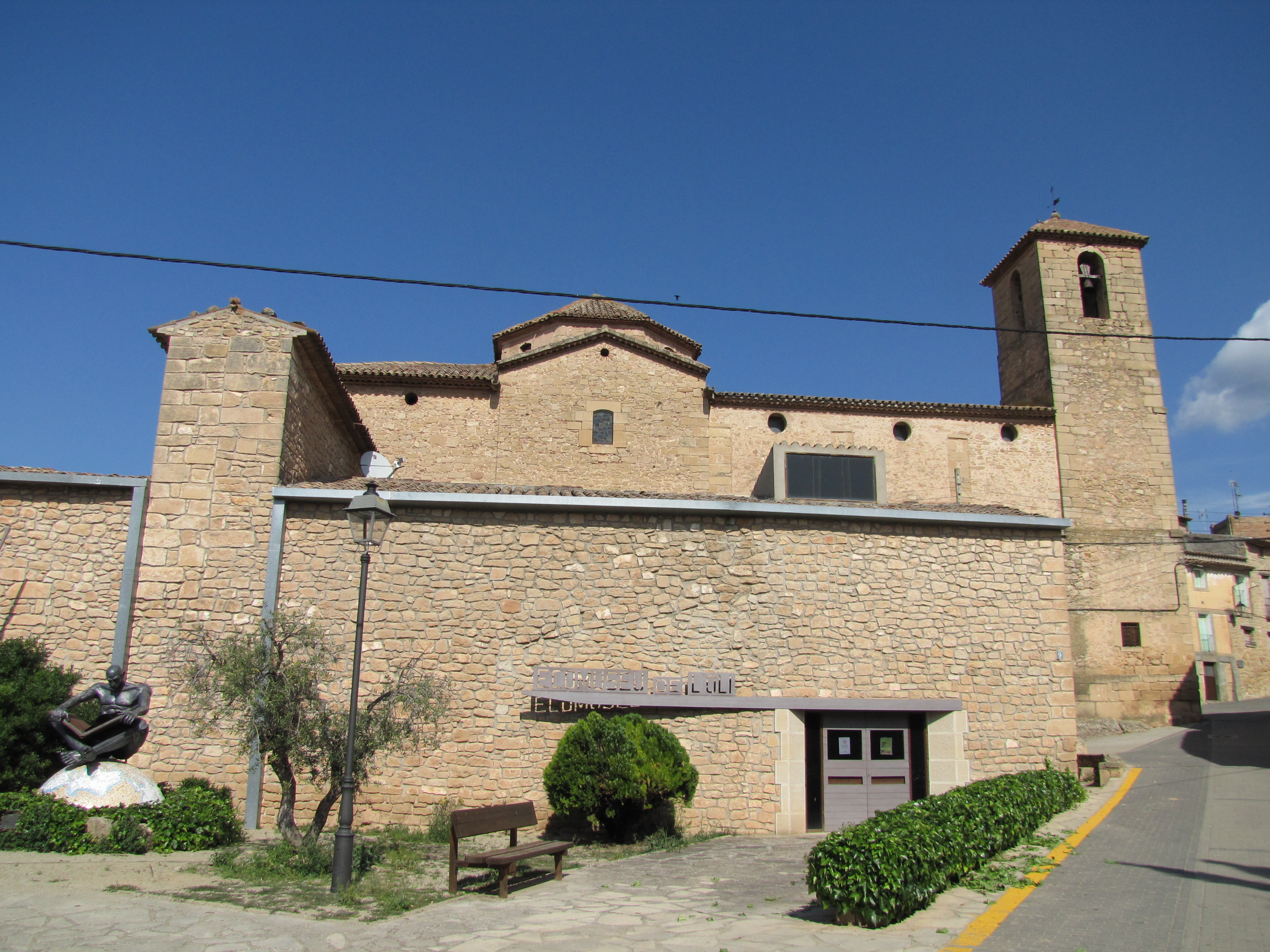
- Oil museum and church

- Flag Coat of arms

- Location in Catalonia
- Coordinates: 41°22′9″N 0°54′59″E
- Country: Spain
- Community: Catalonia
- Province: Lleida
- Comarca: Garrigues

Government
  - Mayor: Jaume Estradé Vall (2015)

Area
  - Total: 61.9 km^{2} (23.9 sq mi)

Population (2025-01-01)
  - Total: 208
  - Density: 3.36/km^{2} (8.70/sq mi)
- Website: poblacervoles.ddl.net

La Pobla de Cérvoles (Catalan pronunciation: [la ˈpob.bla ðe ˈseɾβoles]) is a village in the province of Lleida and autonomous community of Catalonia, Spain. It has a population of 208 (register office, 2025).
