= Puiggròs =

- Municipality
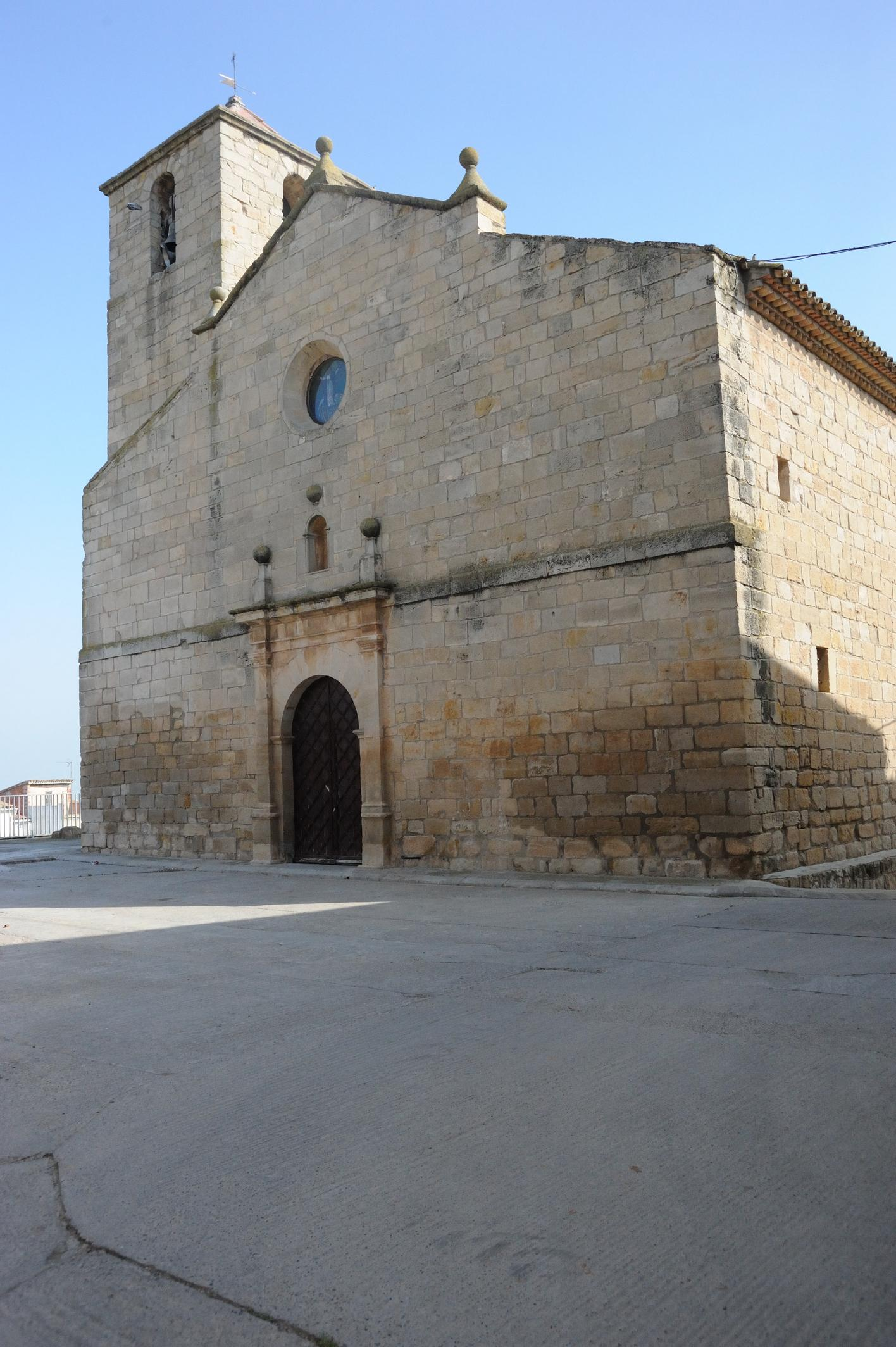
- St. Mary's church, Puiggròs

- Flag Coat of arms

- Location in Catalonia
- Coordinates: 41°33′8″N 0°53′24″E
- Country: Spain
- Community: Catalonia
- Province: Lleida
- Comarca: Garrigues

Government
  - Mayor: Jordi Capdevila Romeu (2015)

Area
  - Total: 9.9 km^{2} (3.8 sq mi)

Population (2025-01-01)
  - Total: 269
  - Density: 27/km^{2} (70/sq mi)
- Website: puiggros.cat

Puiggròs (pronounced [pudʒˈɣɾɔs]; "Large Hill") is a village in the province of Lleida and autonomous community of Catalonia, Spain. It has a population of 269 (register office, 2025).

== Notable people ==
- Alba Caño (born 2003), professional football player
