= El Cogul =

- Municipality
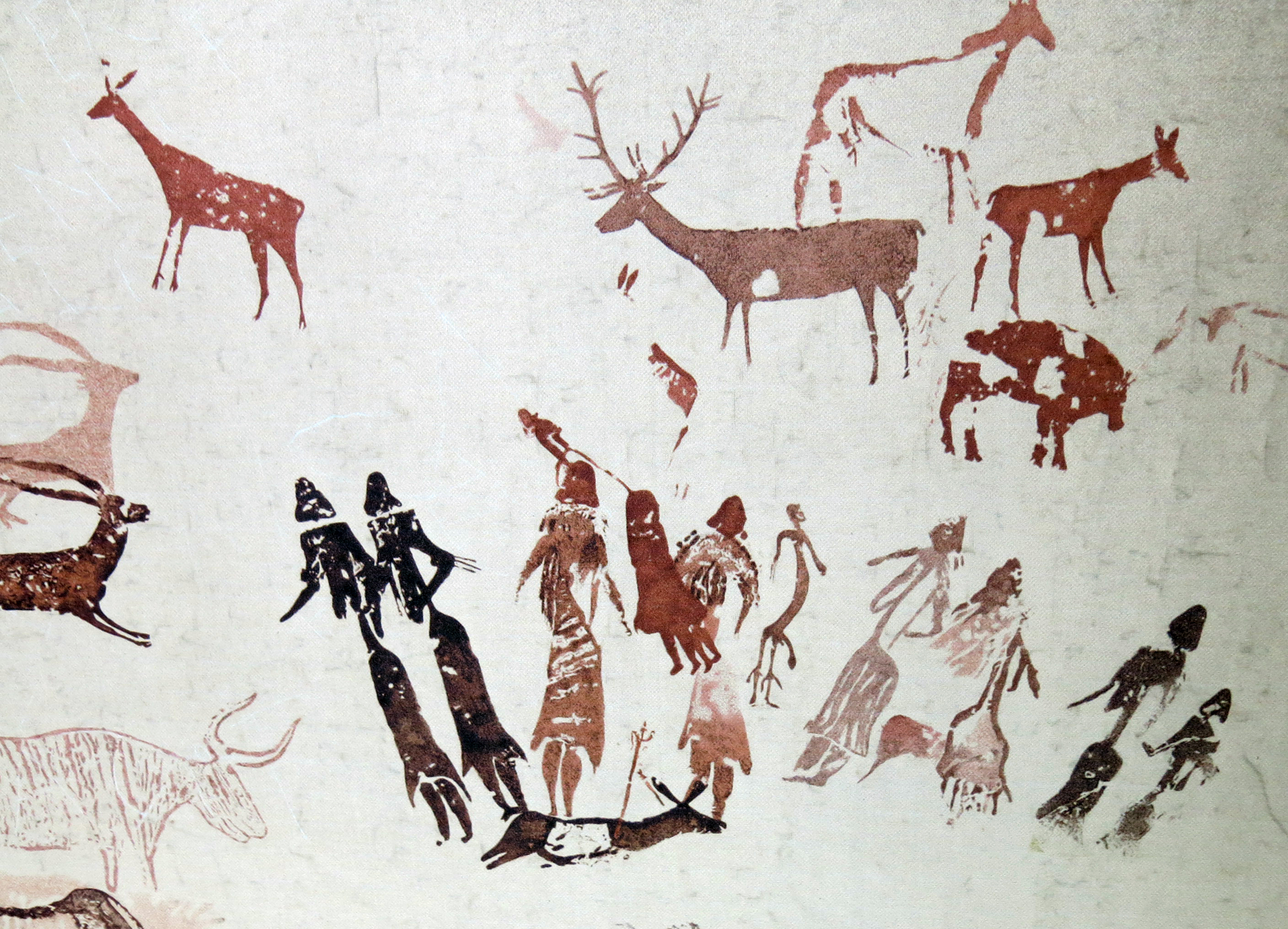
- The Dance, painting at Roca dels Moros

- Flag Coat of arms

- Location in Catalonia
- Coordinates: 41°28′7″N 0°41′26″E
- Country: Spain
- Community: Catalonia
- Province: Lleida
- Comarca: Garrigues

Government
  - Mayor: Núria Civit Abella (2015)

Area
  - Total: 17.5 km^{2} (6.8 sq mi)
- Elevation: 279 m (915 ft)

Population (2025-01-01)
  - Total: 163
  - Density: 9.31/km^{2} (24.1/sq mi)
- Climate: Cfa
- Website: www.cogul.cat

El Cogul (Catalan pronunciation: [el koˈɣul]) is a municipality in Catalonia, Spain. It is in the comarca (county) of les Garrigues in the province of Lleida. It has a population of 163 (register office, 2025).

It is famous for its rock art site Roca dels Moros.
