= El Soleràs =

- Municipality
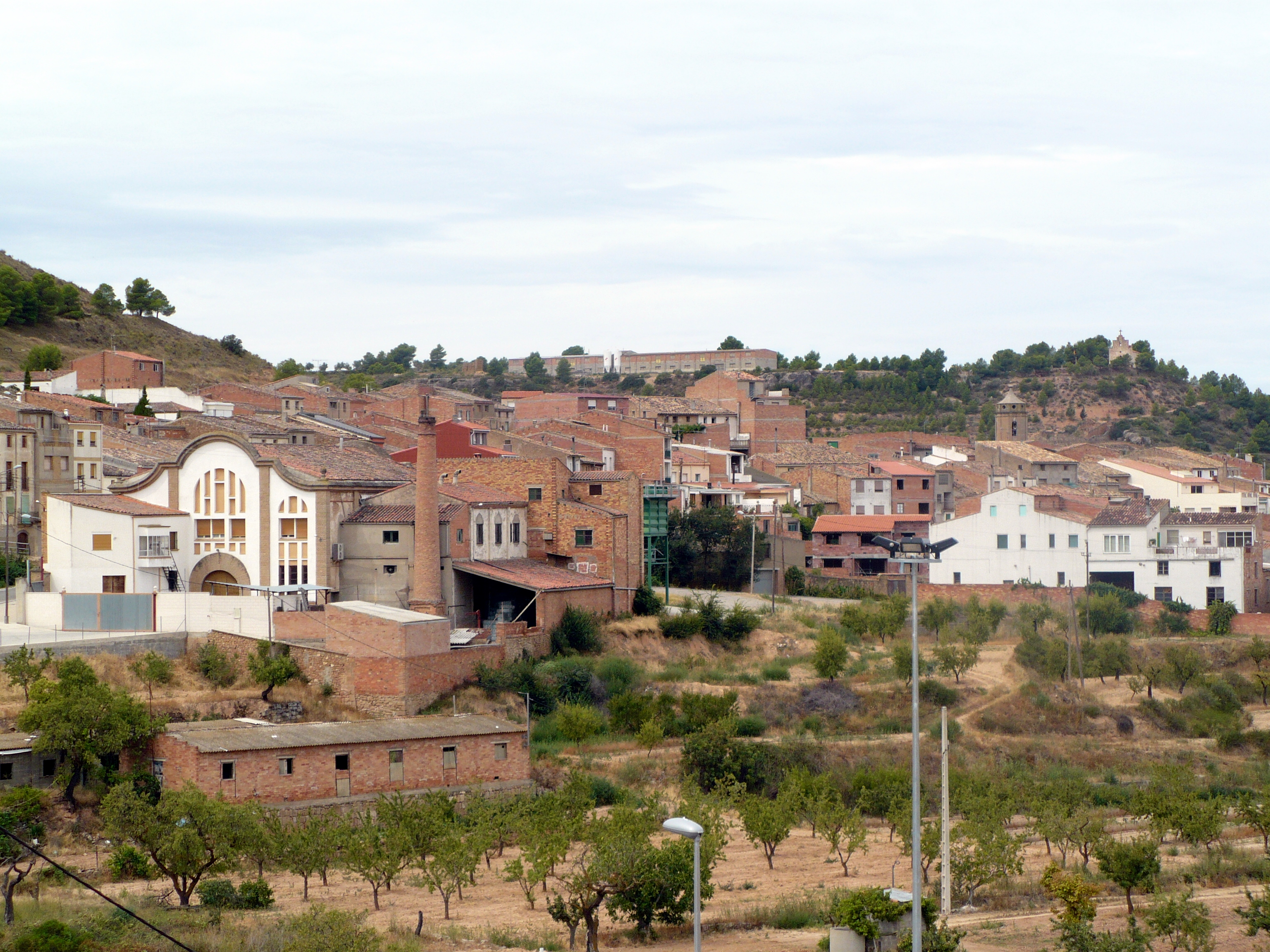

- Flag Coat of arms

- Location in Catalonia
- Coordinates: 41°24′55″N 0°40′58″E
- Country: Spain
- Community: Catalonia
- Province: Lleida
- Comarca: Garrigues

Government
  - Mayor: Jordi Sarlé Marfull (2015)

Area
  - Total: 12.2 km^{2} (4.7 sq mi)

Population (2025-01-01)
  - Total: 308
  - Density: 25.2/km^{2} (65.4/sq mi)
- Website: soleras.ddl.net

El Soleràs (Catalan pronunciation: [el soleˈɾas]) is a village in the province of Lleida and autonomous community of Catalonia, Spain. It has a population of 308 (register office, 2025).
