= Castelldans =

- Municipality
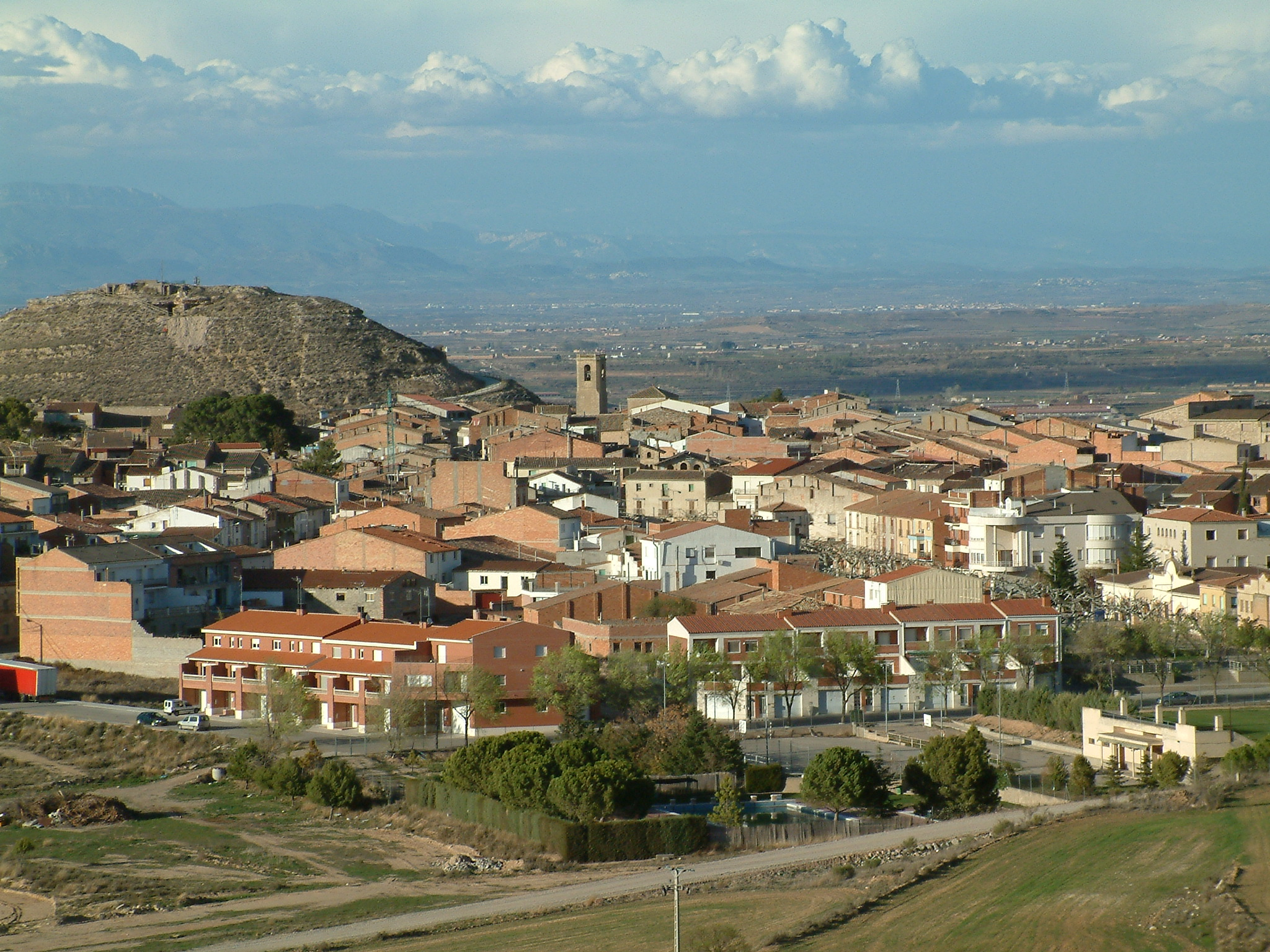
- Castelldans

- Flag Coat of arms

- Location in Catalonia
- Coordinates: 41°30′N 0°46′E
- Country: Spain
- Community: Catalonia
- Province: Lleida
- Comarca: Garrigues

Government
  - Mayor: Conrad Llovera Sala (2015)

Area
  - Total: 65.1 km^{2} (25.1 sq mi)
- Elevation: 353 m (1,158 ft)

Population (2025-01-01)
  - Total: 952
  - Density: 14.6/km^{2} (37.9/sq mi)
- Website: castelldans.cat

Castelldans (Catalan pronunciation: [kasˌteʎˈðans]) is a village in the province of Lleida and autonomous community of Catalonia, Spain. It has a population of 952 (register office, 2025).
