= Bovera =

- Municipality
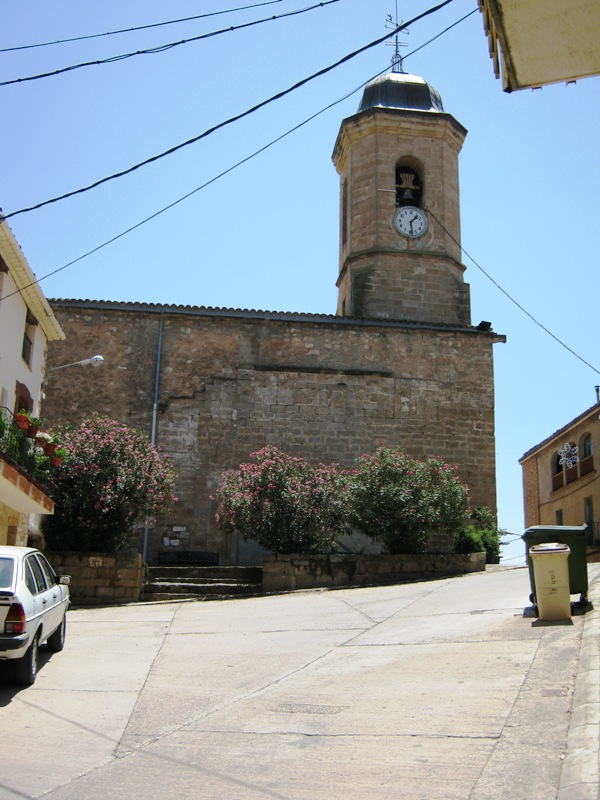
- St. Joseph's church in Bovera

- Coat of arms

- Location in Catalonia
- Coordinates: 41°19′42″N 0°38′24″E
- Country: Spain
- Community: Catalonia
- Province: Lleida
- Comarca: Garrigues

Government
  - Mayor: Òscar R. Acero Giralt (2015)

Area
  - Total: 31.1 km^{2} (12.0 sq mi)
- Elevation: 297 m (974 ft)

Population (2025-01-01)
  - Total: 244
  - Density: 7.85/km^{2} (20.3/sq mi)
- Demonym: Boverí / Boverina
- Postal code: 25178
- Website: bovera.ddl.net

Bovera (Catalan pronunciation: [boˈβeɾɛ]) is a village in Catalonia in Spain. The village is in the comarca (county) of les Garrigues in the region of Lleida. Bovera is close to the town of Flix. The usually dry River Cana valley leads to the Ebre river at Flix. It has a population of 244 (register office, 2025).

In early November 2015 there was unusual rain that caused local flooding that was reported as particularly severe compared with other areas. Damage to 20 or 30% of crops such as olives over more than 1000 hectares was estimated.

== Demography ==
The population of Bovera in 2014 was 290.
