= Granyena de les Garrigues =

- Municipality
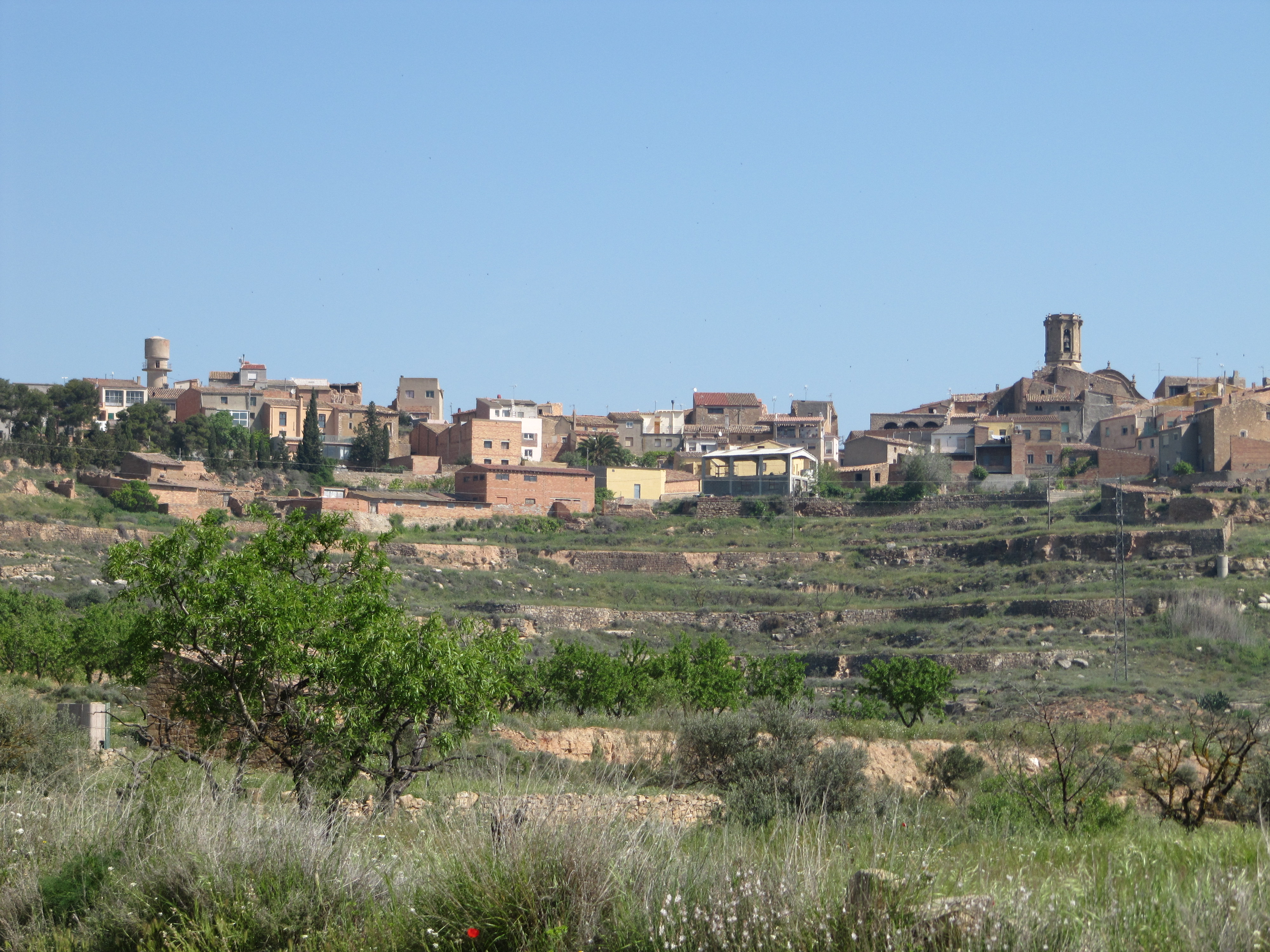
- Granyena de les Garrigues

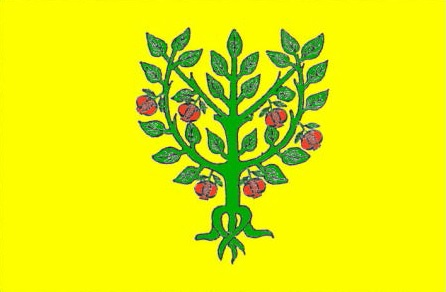
- Flag Coat of arms

- Location in Catalonia
- Coordinates: 41°26′6″N 0°39′2″E
- Country: Spain
- Community: Catalonia
- Province: Lleida
- Comarca: Garrigues

Government
  - Mayor: Francesc Esquerda Tamarit (2015)

Area
  - Total: 20.5 km^{2} (7.9 sq mi)
- Elevation: 366 m (1,201 ft)

Population (2025-01-01)
  - Total: 174
  - Density: 8.49/km^{2} (22.0/sq mi)
- Website: granyenagarrigues.ddl.net

Granyena de les Garrigues (Catalan pronunciation: [gɾaˈɲenɛ ðe lez ɣaˈriɣes]) is a village in the province of Lleida and autonomous community of Catalonia, Spain. It has a population of 174 (register office, 2025).
