= Bellaguarda =

- Municipality
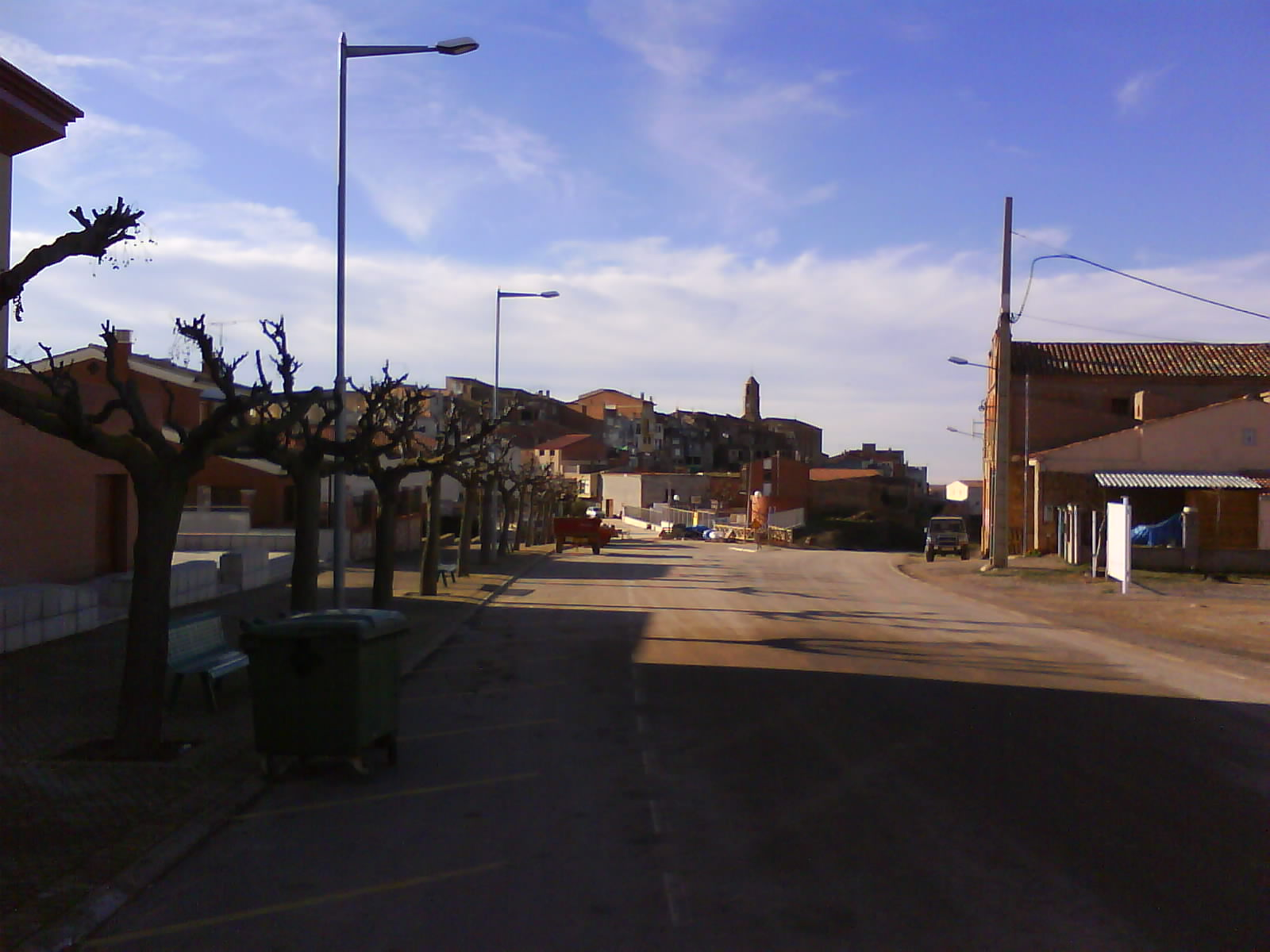
- Bellaguarda

- Flag Coat of arms

- Location in Catalonia
- Coordinates: 41°20′22″N 0°44′13″E
- Country: Spain
- Community: Catalonia
- Province: Lleida
- Comarca: Garrigues

Government
  - Mayor: Jaume Masip Abella (2015)

Area
  - Total: 17.1 km^{2} (6.6 sq mi)
- Elevation: 640 m (2,100 ft)

Population (2025-01-01)
  - Total: 278
  - Density: 16.3/km^{2} (42.1/sq mi)
- Website: bellaguarda.cat

Bellaguarda (Catalan pronunciation: [ˌbeʎaˈɣwaɾðɛ]) is a village in the province of Lleida and autonomous community of Catalonia, Spain. It is the nominal source of the dry River Cana. It has a population of 278 (register office, 2025).
