= Juncosa =

- Municipality
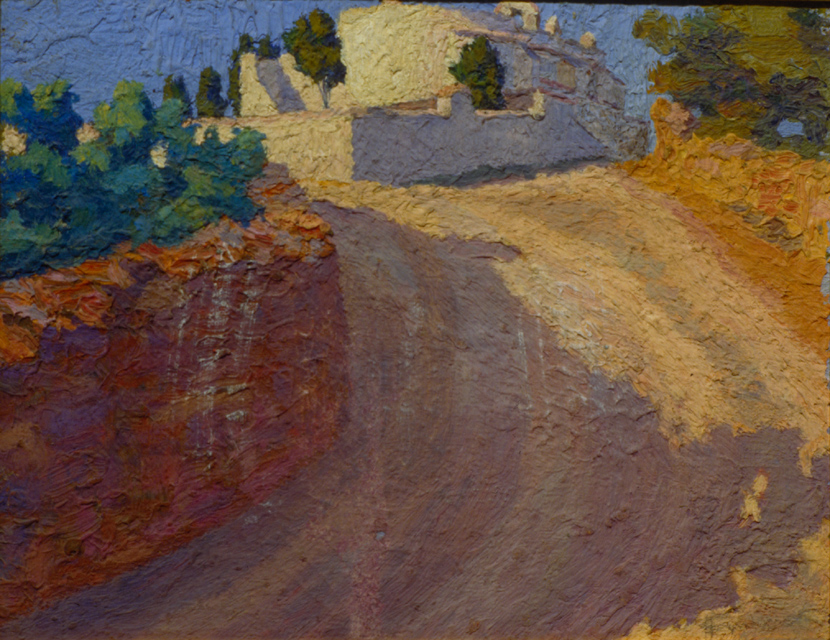
- Paisatge (1912) by Antoni Samarra i Tugues showing Juncosa

- Flag Coat of arms

- Location in Catalonia
- Coordinates: 41°22′21″N 0°46′35″E
- Country: Spain
- Community: Catalonia
- Province: Lleida
- Comarca: Garrigues

Government
  - Mayor: Lluís Dalmau Almacellas (2015)

Area
  - Total: 76.5 km^{2} (29.5 sq mi)
- Elevation: 575 m (1,886 ft)

Population (2025-01-01)
  - Total: 377
  - Density: 4.93/km^{2} (12.8/sq mi)
- Climate: Cfa
- Website: juncosa.cat

Juncosa (Catalan pronunciation: [dʒuŋˈkozɛ]) is a village in the province of Lleida and autonomous community of Catalonia, Spain. It has a population of 377 (register office, 2025).
