= River Cana =

River in Spain

Cana
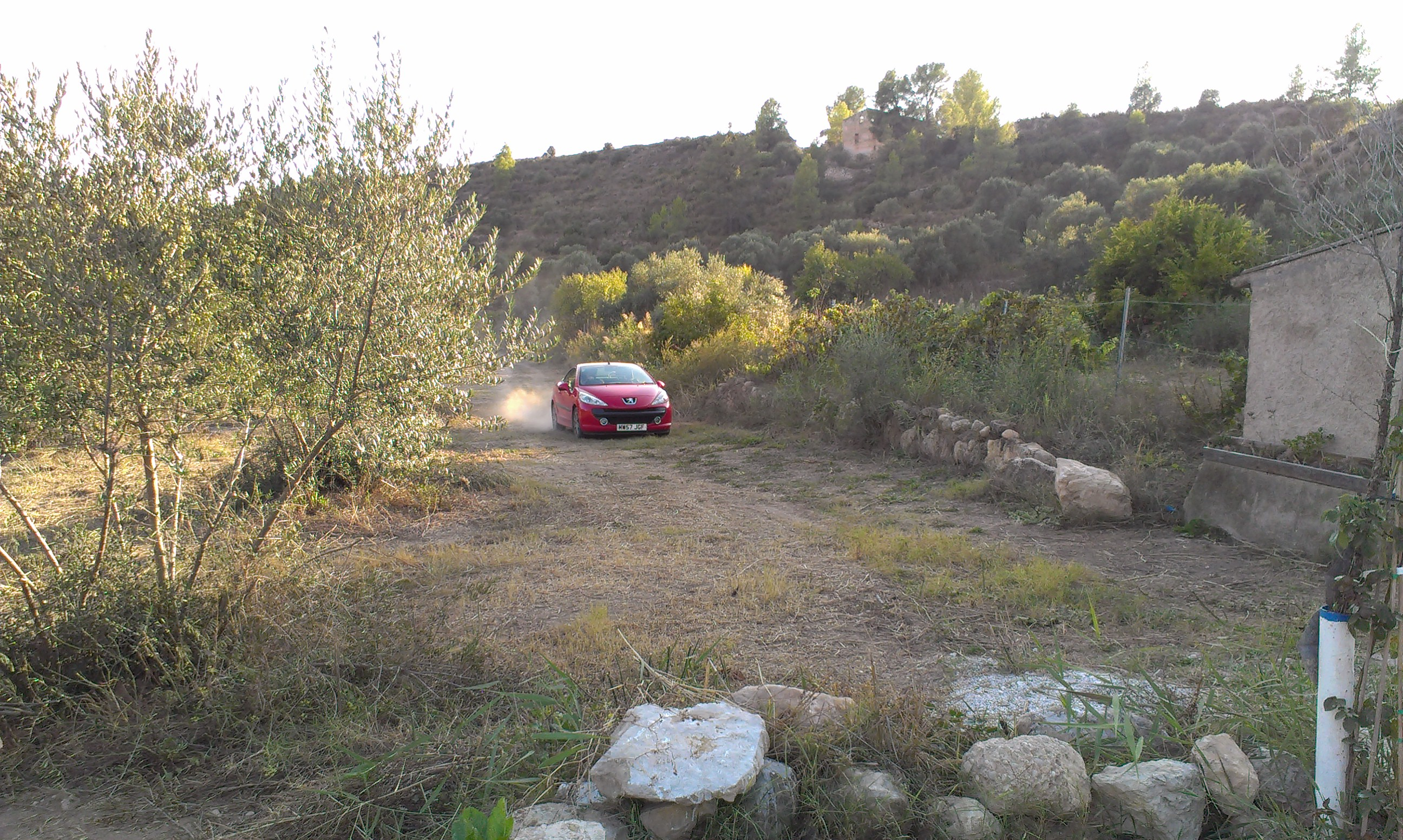
- dirt road to Finca in the Cana valley]

Location
- Country: Spain

Physical characteristics
- Source
  - location: Bellaguarda
- Mouth
  - location: Ebre river at Flix
  - coordinates: 41.246622°N 0.557289°E
- Length: 20.5 km (12.7 mi)
- Basin size: 81 km^{2} (31 sq mi)

The River Cana is a dry river valley that once started at Bellaguarda and travelled through the village of Bovera to the Ebre river at Flix in Catalonia. in Spain. It is in the county of les Garrigues in the region of Lleida.

The river is said to have a length of 20.5 km. The river is dry over the whole year. In November 2015 there was unusual rain that caused local flooding that was reported as particularly severe around Bovera compared with other areas. Damage to 20 or 30% of crops such as olives over more than 1000 hectares was estimated. The river was observed to temporarily and locally flood.
