= L'Albagés =

- Municipality
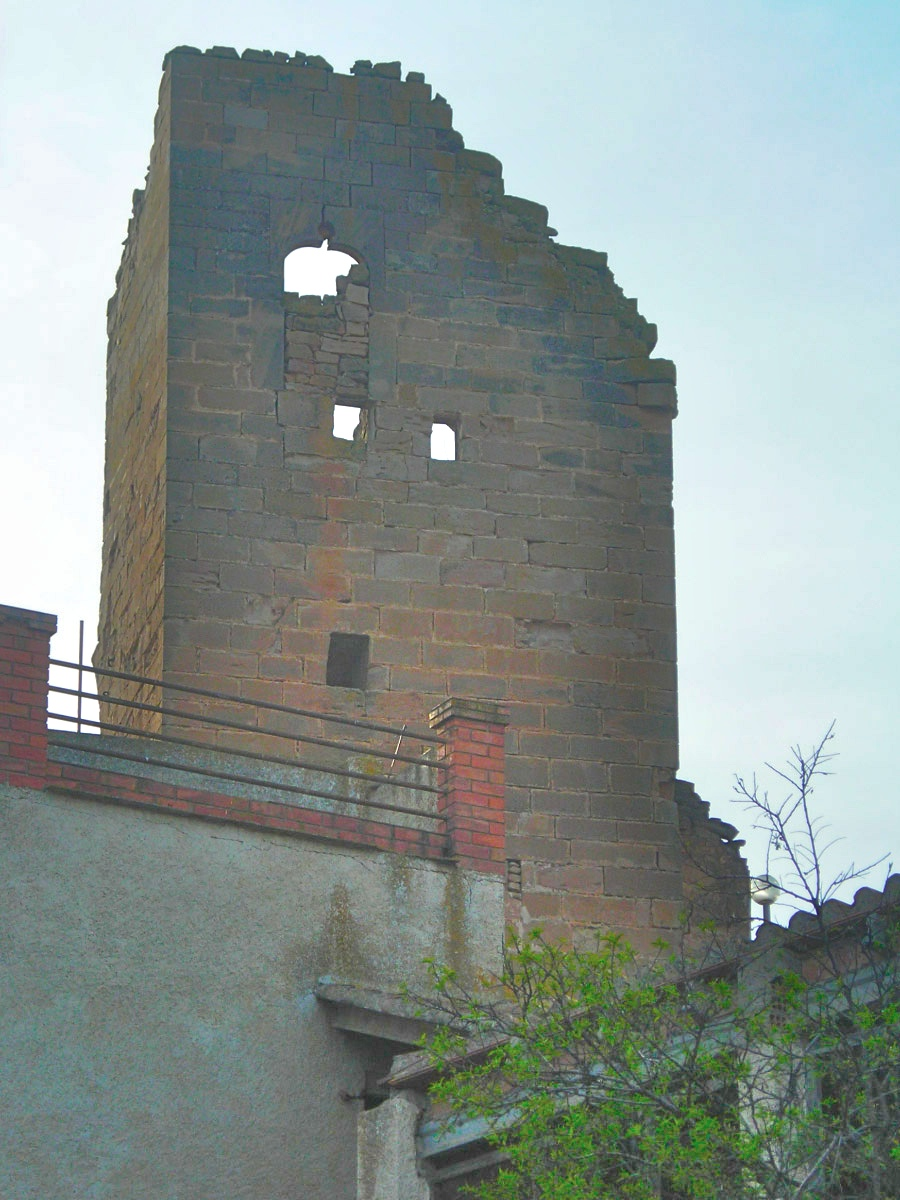
- Remains of castle of l'Albagés

- Flag Coat of arms

- Location in Catalonia
- Coordinates: 41°27′2″N 0°44′25″E
- Country: Spain
- Community: Catalonia
- Province: Lleida
- Comarca: Garrigues

Government
  - Mayor: Víctor Masip Romero (2023)

Area
  - Total: 25.7 km^{2} (9.9 sq mi)
- Elevation: 372 m (1,220 ft)

Population (2025-01-01)
  - Total: 339
  - Density: 13.2/km^{2} (34.2/sq mi)
- Website: albages.cat

L'Albagés (Catalan pronunciation: [lalβaˈʒes]) is a village in Garrigues, province of Lleida, Catalonia, Spain. It has a population of 339 (register office, 2025).
