= Cervià de les Garrigues =

- Municipality
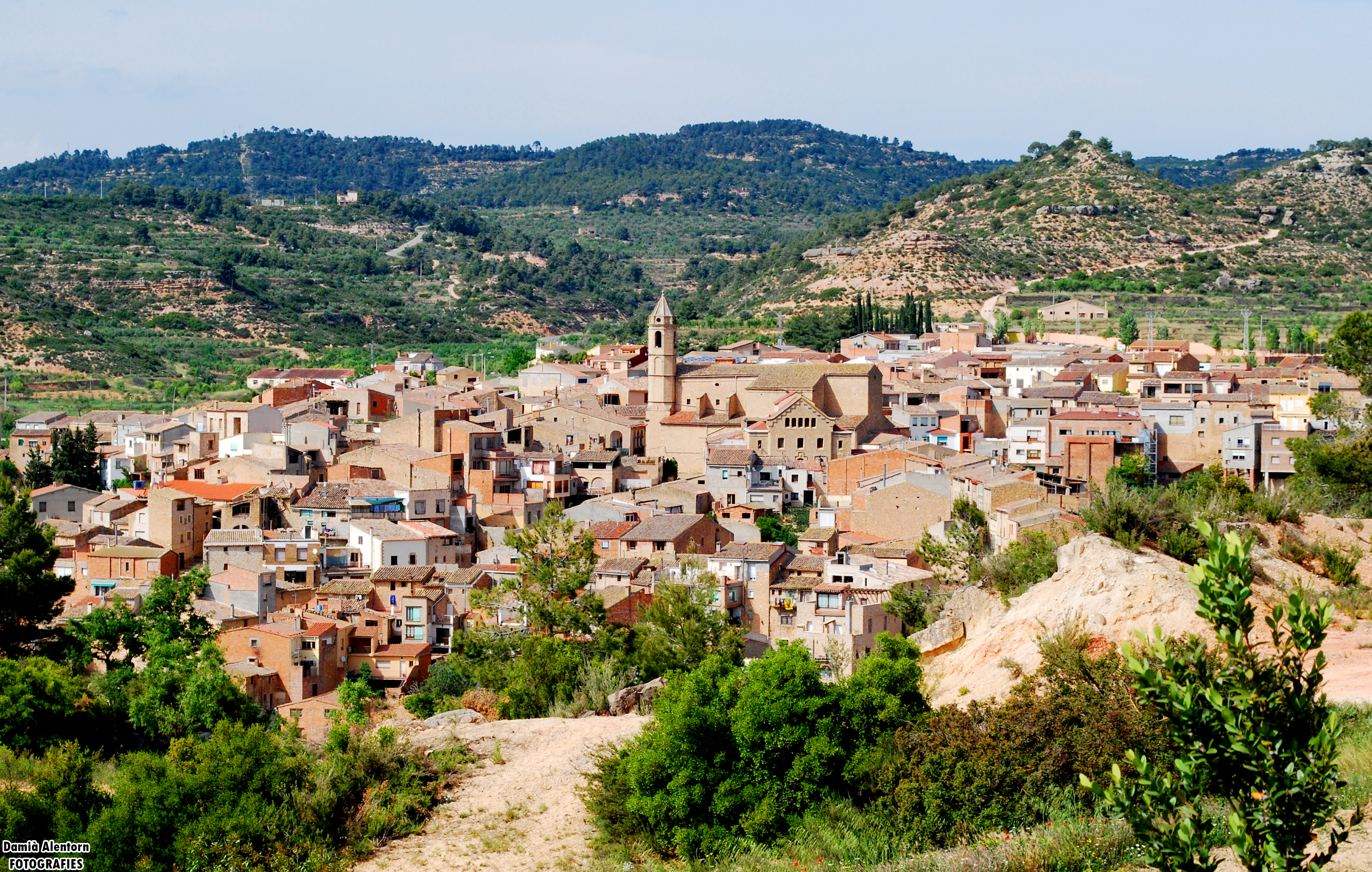
- Cervià de les Garrigues

- Location in Catalonia
- Coordinates: 41°25′28″N 0°51′36″E
- Country: Spain
- Community: Catalonia
- Province: Lleida
- Comarca: Garrigues

Government
  - Mayor: Maria Mercedes Rubió Carré (2015)

Area
  - Total: 34.2 km^{2} (13.2 sq mi)
- Elevation: 444 m (1,457 ft)

Population (2025-01-01)
  - Total: 641
  - Density: 18.7/km^{2} (48.5/sq mi)
- Website: cervia.ddl.net

Cervià de les Garrigues (Catalan pronunciation: [seɾβiˈa ðe lez ɣaˈriɣes]) is a village in the province of Lleida and autonomous community of Catalonia, Spain. It has a population of 641 (register office, 2025).
