= Els Torms =

- Municipality
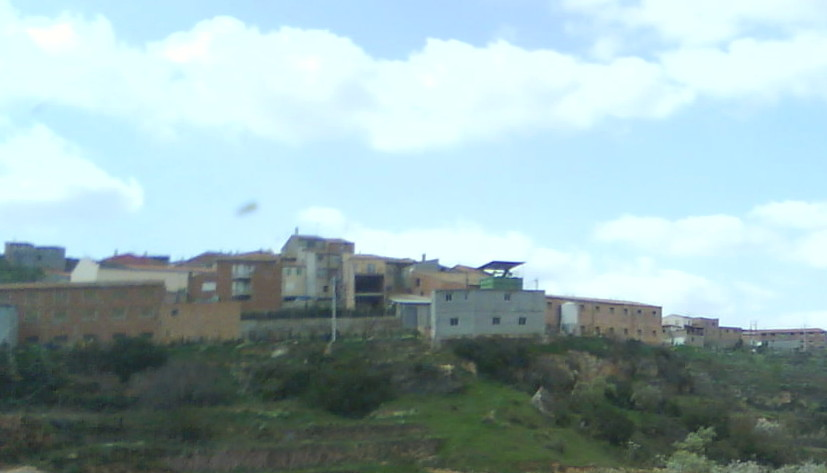
- Els Torms

- Coat of arms

- Location in Catalonia
- Coordinates: 41°23′45″N 0°43′17″E
- Country: Spain
- Community: Catalonia
- Province: Lleida
- Comarca: Garrigues

Government
  - Mayor: Josep Bardia Preixens (2015)

Area
  - Total: 13.8 km^{2} (5.3 sq mi)

Population (2025-01-01)
  - Total: 135
  - Density: 9.78/km^{2} (25.3/sq mi)
- Website: elstorms.cat

Els Torms (Catalan pronunciation: [els ˈtoɾms]) is a village in the province of Lleida and autonomous community of Catalonia, Spain. It has a population of 135 (register office, 2025).
