= Els Omellons =

- Municipality
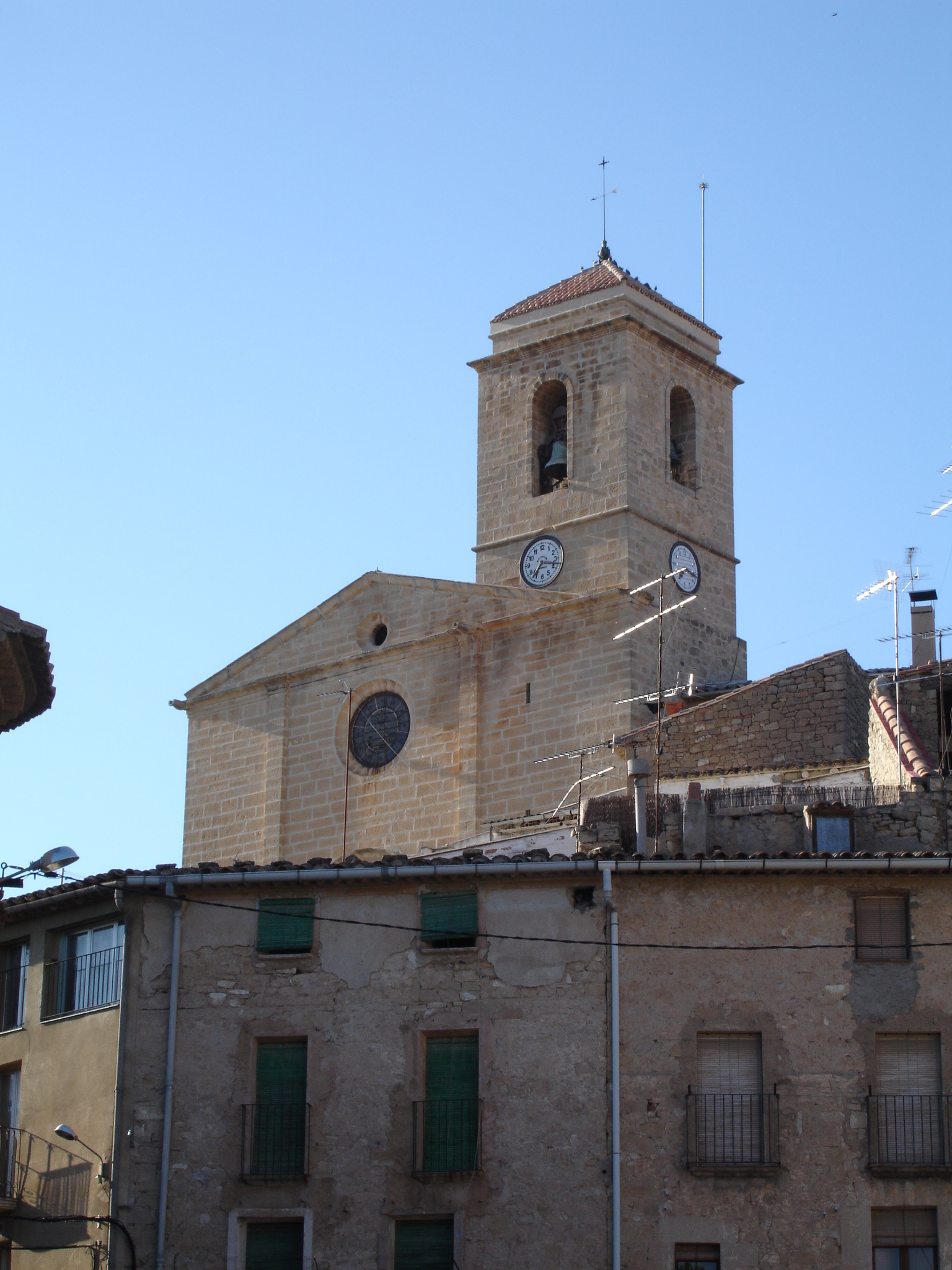
- St. Michael's church

- Coat of arms

- Location in Catalonia
- Coordinates: 41°30′13″N 0°57′41″E
- Country: Spain
- Community: Catalonia
- Province: Lleida
- Comarca: Garrigues

Government
  - Mayor: Jordi Gaya Masana (2015)

Area
  - Total: 11.1 km^{2} (4.3 sq mi)

Population (2025-01-01)
  - Total: 187
  - Density: 16.8/km^{2} (43.6/sq mi)
- Website: omellons.cat

Els Omellons (Catalan pronunciation: [elz omeˈʎons]) is a village in the province of Lleida and autonomous community of Catalonia, Spain. It has a population of 187 (register office, 2025).
