= Fulleda =

- Municipality
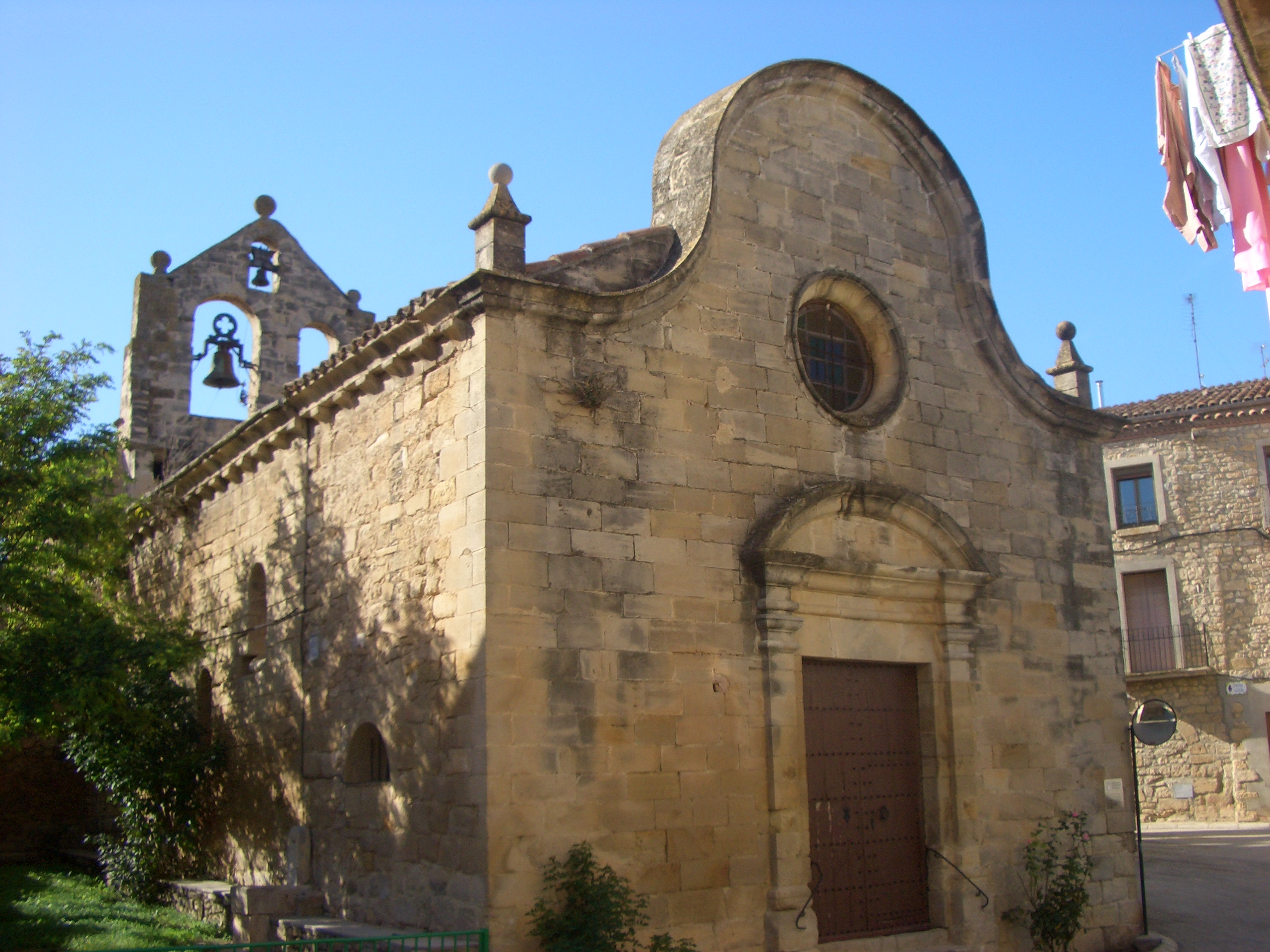
- Església de Santa Maria de Fulleda

- Flag Coat of arms

- Location in Catalonia
- Coordinates: 41.463°N 1.025°E
- Country: Spain
- Community: Catalonia
- Province: Lleida
- Comarca: Garrigues

Government
  - Mayor: Jordi Arbós Gabarró (2015)

Area
  - Total: 16.2 km^{2} (6.3 sq mi)
- Elevation: 581 m (1,906 ft)

Population (2025-01-01)
  - Total: 87
  - Density: 5.4/km^{2} (14/sq mi)
- Website: fulleda.cat

Fulleda (Catalan pronunciation: [fuˈʎɛða]) is a village in the comarca of Les Garrigues, in the province of Lleida, in Catalonia, Spain. It has a population of 87 (register office, 2025).

The population is about 115. The economy of the village is agrarian, with the cultivation on its unirrigated land of almonds, cereals, vineyard, olives, etc.

Fulleda is situated in the east of Les Garrigues, near the comarca of Conca de Barberà, and about 40 kilometers from Lleida, the capital of the province of the same name.
