= Province of Lleida =

Province of Spain

Province of Lleida Provincia de Lérida (Spanish) Província de Lleida (Catalan) Província de Lhèida (Occitan)
- Province
- Flag Coat of arms

- Location of the Province of Lérida in Spain
- Coordinates: 42°00′N 1°10′E
- Country: Spain
- Autonomous community: Catalonia
- Capital: Lleida
- Municipalities: 231

Government
  - President: Joan Talarn i Gilabert (ERC)

Area
  - Total: 12,163.49 km^{2} (4,696.35 sq mi)
  - Rank: 18th in Spain
- 2.4% of Spain

Population (2025)
  - Total: 458,226
  - Rank: 33rd in Spain
  - Density: 37.6722/km^{2} (97.5707/sq mi)
- 0.9% of Spain
- Time zone: UTC+1 (CET)
  - Summer (DST): UTC+2 (CEST)
- Official languages: Catalan; Spanish; Occitan (Aranese)
- Parliament: Cortes Generales
- Website: www.diputaciolleida.cat

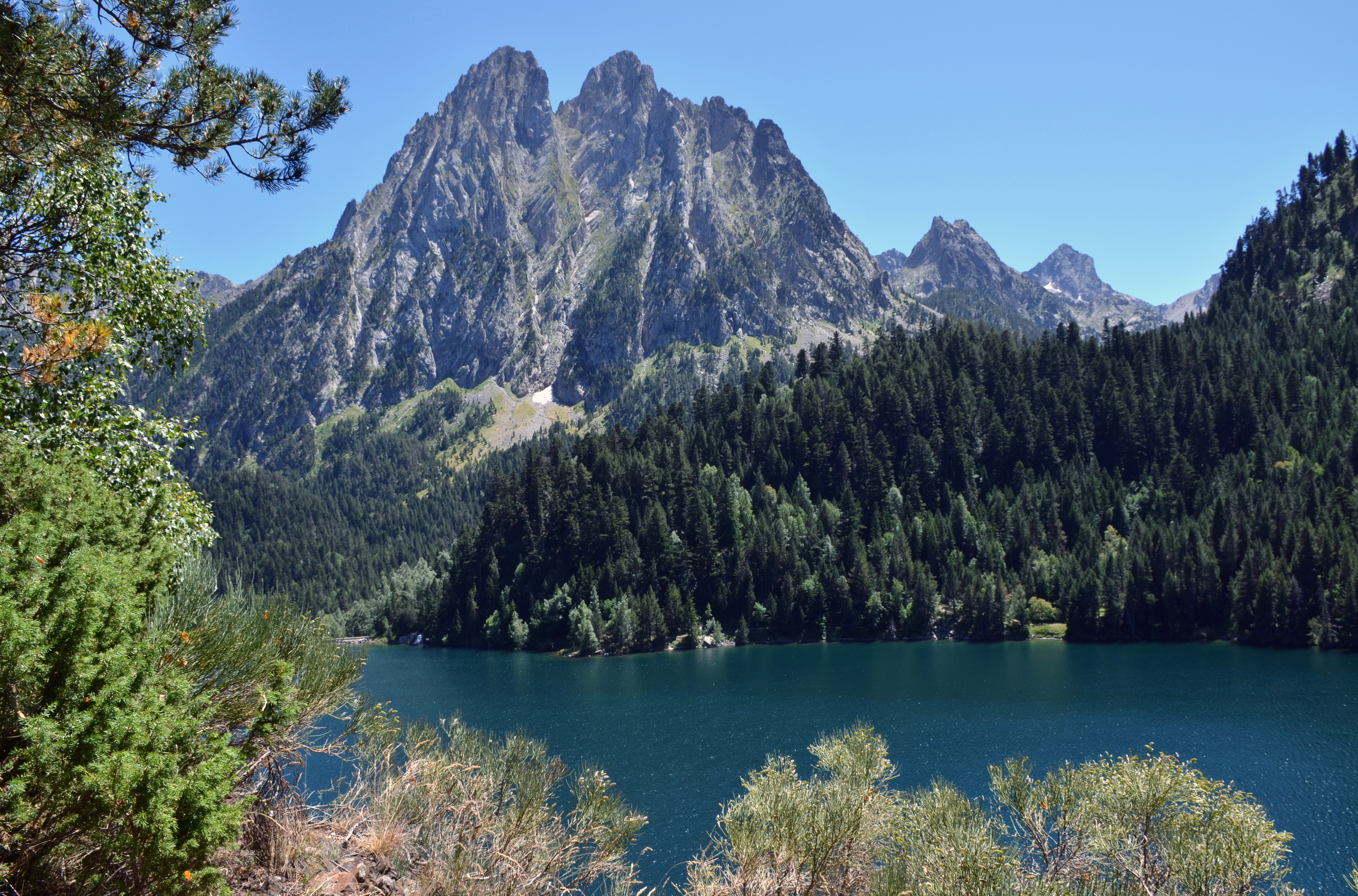
A view of Aigüestortes i Estany de Sant Maurici National Park.

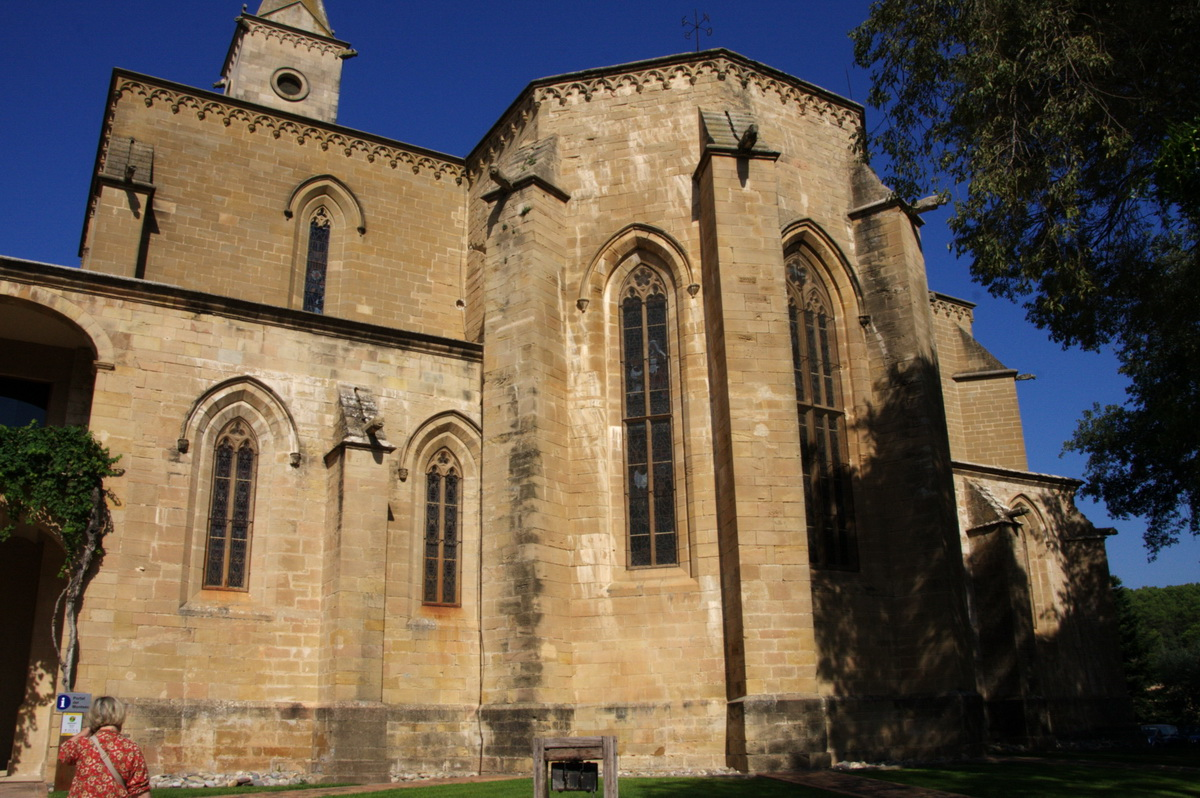
Monastery of Santa Maria de Bellpuig de les Avellanes.

The Province of Lleida (Spanish: Provincia de Lérida [ˈleɾiða]; Catalan: Província de Lleida Western Catalan: [ˈʎejða]; Aranese: Província de Lhèida [ˈʎɛjda]) is one of the four provinces of the autonomous community of Catalonia in Spain. It is bordered by the provinces of Girona, Barcelona, Tarragona, Zaragoza and Huesca and the country of France and the principality of Andorra. It is often popularly referred to as Ponent (i.e. the West), and is a popular destination for mountain activities such as skiing and adventure sports.

It has a population of 458,226 in an area of 12,163.49 square kilometres (4,696.35 sq mi) across its 231 municipalities. 32.2% of the population lives in the capital and largest city, Lleida. Some other towns in the province of Lleida are La Seu d'Urgell (the archbishop of which is also the co-prince of Andorra), Mollerussa, Cervera, Tàrrega, and Balaguer.

Located in the Pyrenees, the Aran Valley is a special comarca with greater autonomy and with Aranese, a variety of Occitan, as its official language.

The Aigüestortes i Estany de Sant Maurici National Park is located in this province.

The province enjoys a thriving fruit-growing industry, including pears and peaches.

According to the 2006 Statute of Autonomy of Catalonia, the provinces of Catalonia are due to be superseded by territorial units (unitats territorials) or vegueries based on a more historical political division, and the province of Lleida would become two territorial units: Ponent or Terres de Lleida Vegueria (the entire southern area) and Alt Pirineu i Aran Vegueria (the entire northern part plus the comarca of Cerdanya, part of which is currently in the Province of Girona), the county of Solsona going to the Comarques Centrals (Central Counties) Vegueria. The plan is currently on hold as of 2015.

== Geography ==
Lleida is located in the western part of Catalonia and in the northeast of the Iberian Peninsula, between Barcelona and Madrid, and not far from Zaragoza. It borders France and Andorra to the north.

=== Nature ===
Lleida has a wide variety of landscapes. This includes the mountain area of the Pyrenees. The Aigüestortes i Estany de Sant Maurici National Park, the only National Park in Catalonia, and the Alt Pirineu (High Pyrenees) and Cadí-Moixeró natural parks are all in the Pyrenees region. The Collegats-Terradets Territorial Park, the Boumort Natural Hunting Reserve and the Congost de Mont-rebei gorge are in the Pre-Pyrenees.

In contrast, the Lleida Plain has more peaceful landscapes. In some cases, these are rather sober, while in others there is fertile land with century-old olive trees, fruit trees, meadows and crop fields. In this area, it is particularly relevant to highlight such spectacular settings as the Estany d'Ivars i Vila-sana pool and the Aiguabarreig (confluence) of the rivers Segre, Cinca and Ebro. On 6 January 2021, in Tuc de la Llança, Spain's absolute minimum temperature of −34.1 °C (−29.4 °F) was registered.

== Administration ==
=== Composition of the Provincial Deputation ===
Provincial Deputation of Lleida Diputació de Lleida (Catalan) Deputacion de Lhèida (Occitan) Diputación de Lleida (Spanish)
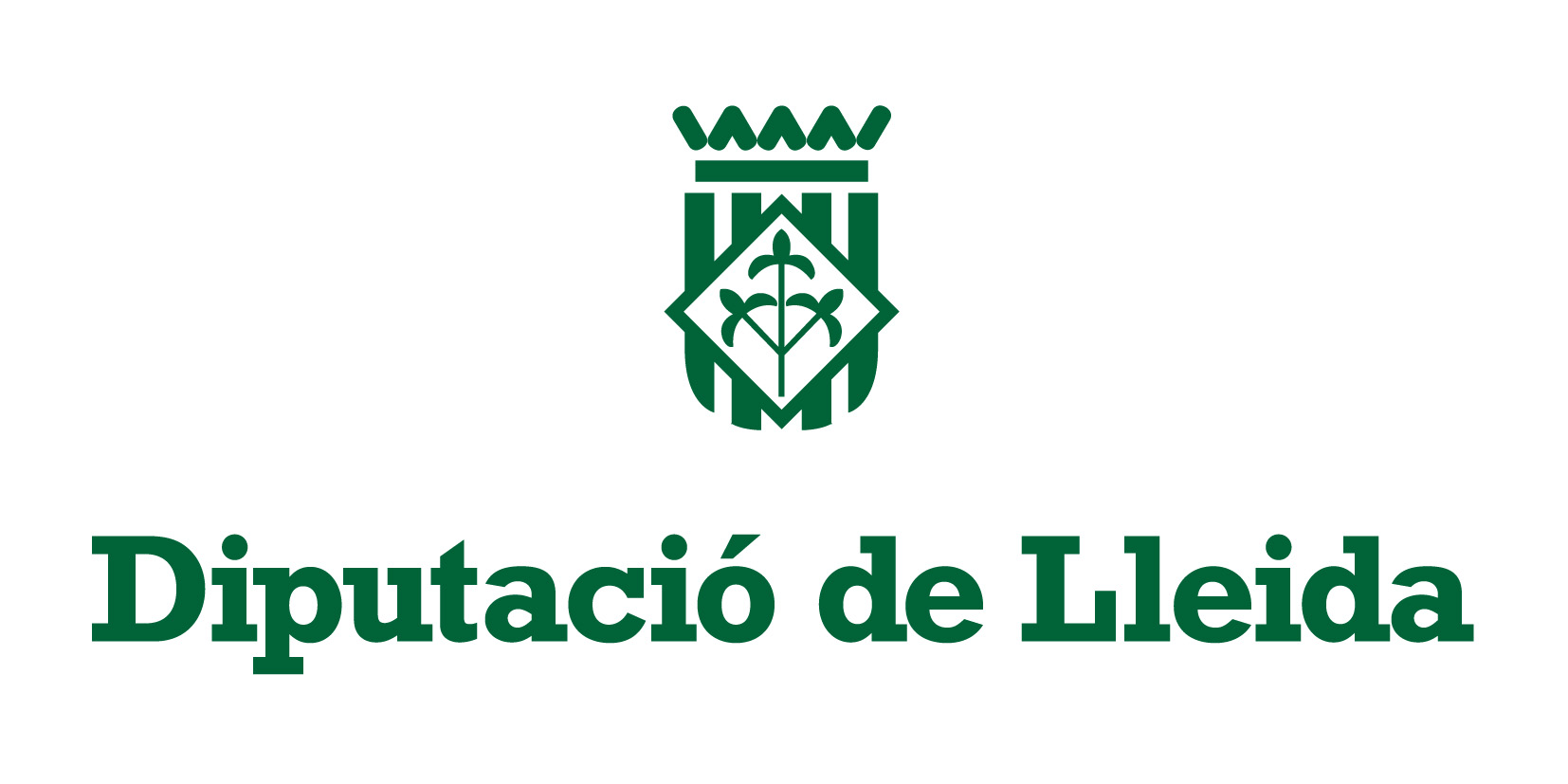
- Logo

Type
- Type: Provincial Deputation

History
- Founded: 1822

Structure
- Seats: 25
- Political groups: Government (13): ERC (8); PSC (3); UA (1); Ara PL (1); Opposition (12): Junts (10); PP (2)
- Length of term: 4 years
- Province of Lleida

Agency overview
- Employees: 615
- Annual budget: €164 million
- Website: Official website

Key to parties CUP PSUC ICV ERC UA PSC JxCat Junts Ara PL CC–UCD CDA–PNA CiU Cs PP
Election	Distribution
1979	1 / 10 / 3 / 10
1983	9 / 1 / 6 / 7 / 2
1987	6 / 1 / 17 / 1
1991	7 / 17 / 1
1995	8 / 1 / 14 / 2
1999	2 / 7 / 1 / 14 / 1
2003	1 / 4 / 1 / 5 / 13 / 1
2007	3 / 1 / 9 / 11 / 1
2011	2 / 7 / 1 / 13 / 2
2015	1 / 6 / 1 / 3 / 14 / 1 / 1
2019	1 / 11 / 1 / 2 / 9 / 1
2023	8 / 1 / 3 / 10 / 1 / 2

=== Municipalities ===
The province has 231 municipalities:

- Abella de la Conca
- Àger
- Agramunt
- Aitona
- Alàs i Cerc
- Albatàrrec
- Albesa
- Alcanó
- Alcarràs
- Alcoletge
- Alfarràs
- Alfés
- Algerri
- Alguaire
- Alins
- Almacelles
- Almatret
- Almenar
- Alòs de Balaguer
- Alpicat
- Alt Àneu
- Anglesola
- Arbeca
- Arres
- Arsèguel
- Artesa de Lleida
- Artesa de Segre
- Aspa
- Baix Pallars
- Balaguer
- Barbens
- Bassella
- Bausen
- Belianes
- Bell-lloc d'Urgell
- Bellaguarda
- Bellcaire d'Urgell
- Bellmunt d'Urgell
- Bellpuig
- Bellver de Cerdanya
- Bellvís
- Benavent de Segrià
- Biosca
- Bossòst
- Bovera
- Cabanabona
- Cabó
- Camarasa
- Canejan
- Castell de Mur
- Castellar de la Ribera
- Castelldans
- Castellnou de Seana
- Castelló de Farfanya
- Castellserà
- Cava
- Cervera
- Cervià de les Garrigues
- Ciutadilla
- Clariana de Cardener
- Coll de Nargó
- Conca de Dalt
- Corbins
- Cubells
- El Cogul
- El Palau d'Anglesola
- El Poal
- El Pont de Bar
- El Pont de Suert
- El Soleràs
- El Vilosell
- Els Alamús
- Els Omellons
- Els Omells de na Gaia
- Els Plans de Sió
- Els Torms
- Es Bòrdes
- Espot
- Estamariu
- Estaràs
- Esterri d'Àneu
- Esterri de Cardós
- Farrera
- Fígols i Alinyà
- Fondarella
- Foradada
- Fulleda
- Gavet de la Conca
- Gimenells i el Pla de la Font
- Golmés
- Gósol
- Granyanella
- Granyena de les Garrigues
- Granyena de Segarra
- Guimerà
- Guissona
- Guixers
- Isona i Conca Dellà
- Ivars d'Urgell
- Ivars de Noguera
- Ivorra
- Josa i Tuixén
- Juncosa
- Juneda
- L'Albagés
- L'Albi
- L'Espluga Calba
- La Baronia de Rialb
- La Coma i la Pedra
- La Floresta
- La Fuliola
- La Granadella
- La Granja d'Escarp
- La Guingueta d'Àneu
- La Molsosa
- La Pobla de Cérvoles
- La Pobla de Segur
- La Portella
- La Sentiu de Sió
- La Seu d'Urgell
- La Torre de Cabdella
- La Vansa i Fórnols
- Les Avellanes i Santa Linya
- Les Borges Blanques
- Les Oluges
- Les Valls d'Aguilar
- Les Valls de Valira
- Les
- Linyola
- Lladorre
- Lladurs
- Llardecans
- Llavorsí
- Lleida
- Lles de Cerdanya
- Llimiana
- Llobera
- Maials
- Maldà
- Massalcoreig
- Massoteres
- Menàrguens
- Miralcamp
- Mollerussa
- Montellà i Martinet
- Montferrer i Castellbò
- Montgai
- Montoliu de Lleida
- Montoliu de Segarra
- Montornès de Segarra
- Nalec
- Naut Aran
- Navès
- Odèn
- Oliana
- Oliola
- Olius
- Organyà
- Os de Balaguer
- Ossó de Sió
- Penelles
- Peramola
- Pinell de Solsonès
- Pinós
- Ponts
- Prats i Sansor
- Preixana
- Preixens
- Prullans
- Puiggròs
- Puigverd d'Agramunt
- Puigverd de Lleida
- Rialp
- Ribera d'Ondara
- Ribera d'Urgellet
- Riner
- Riu de Cerdanya
- Rosselló
- Salàs de Pallars
- Sanaüja
- Sant Esteve de la Sarga
- Sant Guim de Freixenet
- Sant Guim de la Plana
- Sant Llorenç de Morunys
- Sant Martí de Riucorb
- Sant Ramon
- Sarroca de Bellera
- Sarroca de Lleida
- Senterada
- Seròs
- Sidamon
- Solsona
- Soriguera
- Sort
- Soses
- Sudanell
- Sunyer
- Talarn
- Talavera
- Tàrrega
- Tarrés
- Tarroja de Segarra
- Térmens
- Tírvia
- Tiurana
- Torà
- Tornabous
- Torre-serona
- Torrebesses
- Torrefarrera
- Torrefeta i Florejacs
- Torregrossa
- Torrelameu
- Torres de Segre
- Tremp
- Vall de Boí
- Vall de Cardós
- Vallbona de les Monges
- Vallfogona de Balaguer
- Verdú
- Vielha e Mijaran
- Vila-sana
- Vilagrassa
- Vilaller
- Vilamòs
- Vilanova de Bellpuig
- Vilanova de l'Aguda
- Vilanova de la Barca
- Vilanova de Meià
- Vilanova de Segrià
- Vinaixa

== Demographics ==
Historical population
Year	Pop.	±%
1842	152,591	—
1857	306,994	+101.2%
1877	297,377	−3.1%
1887	296,609	−0.3%
1900	283,909	−4.3%
1910	295,645	+4.1%
1920	324,894	+9.9%
1930	319,857	−1.6%
1940	308,851	−3.4%
1950	323,460	+4.7%
1960	334,567	+3.4%
1970	347,101	+3.7%
1981	353,160	+1.7%
1991	353,455	+0.1%
2001	362,206	+2.5%
2011	438,428	+21.0%
2021	439,258	+0.2%
Source: INE

As of 2025, the population is 458,226, of which 51.4% are males, and 48.6% are females. Minors make up 17.1% of the population, and seniors make up 20.1%.

=== Immigration ===
As of 2025, immigrants make up 24.6% of the population. The 5 largest foreign countries of birth are Morocco, Romania, Colombia, Senegal, and Ukraine.

== Culture ==
Lleida has a rich architectural heritage. The churches of the Vall de Boi have been declared part of a UNESCO World Heritage Site. Recently Lleida has started many new initiatives for tourists. These include: the Centre d'Observació de l'Univers (Centre for Observing the Universe), or PAM, of Montsec, which is an ambitious project that combines research, education and diffusion within the field of cultural and scientific tourism; the establishment of the Tren dels Llacs (Lakes Train), a touristic railway that connects the provincial capital to the Pre-Pyrenees; the creation of new exhibition spaces (including the Museum of Lleida, the Paper Dresses Museum of Mollerussa and the Skiing Museum of the Val d'Aran); the organisation of routes to help discover the natural, cultural and monumental treasures of Lleida (with the Castles of Sió Route, the Pyrenean Counties and Nostalgic Pallars Route, the Wine Route of Les Garrigues, and the Literary Routes of Pallars, etc.); and also projects to promote excellence in the field of tourism, such as the Network of Villages with Charm.

=== Language ===
The province of Lleida has a characteristic Catalan dialect popularly known as lleidatà, with lo/los used as the masculine definite article instead of el/els as well as its pronunciation in a large number of words. One example of the pronunciation is the a at the end of the word that is pronounced like an e. The local dialect, properly known as North-Western Catalan, is part of the Western Catalan block, and as such, shares some features with Valencian (whose dialects are also part of that group).

Lleida is the only province in Catalonia to have a second native language: Occitan, in the Aran Valley.

=== The city of Lleida ===
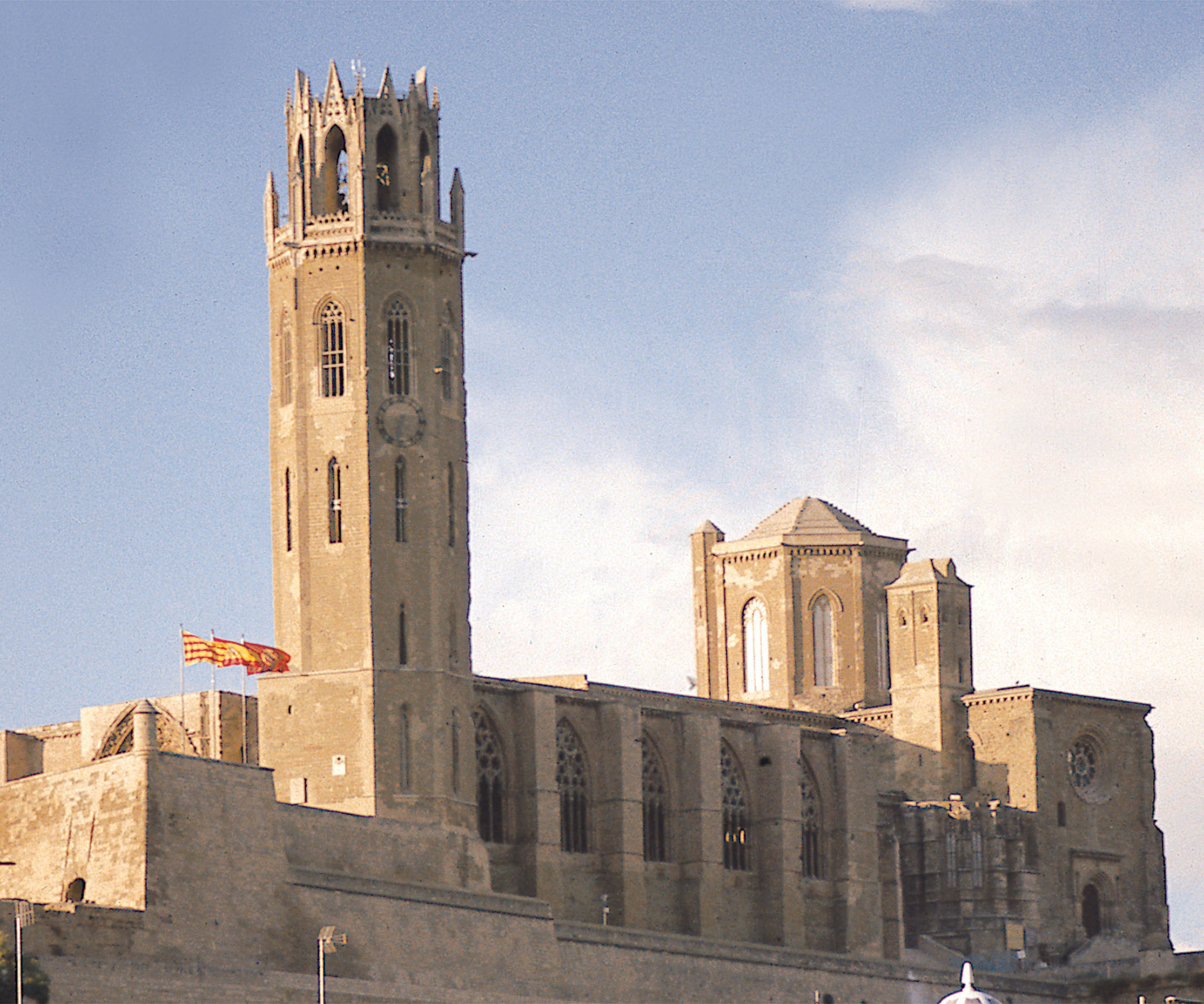
Seu Vella in Lleida.

Lleida, the capital of the province, is notable for its historical-architectural legacy, which includes buildings such as the Seu Vella (old cathedral) and the Knights Templar Castle of Gardeny. These buildings coexist with modern constructions such as La Llotja, a congress and conference centre. Other city landmarks include the diocese and county museum (which has a collection of Roman, Islamic, Romanesque, Gothic, Renaissance and Baroque artefacts and paintings), the Jaume Morera Museum of Modern Art, and the "Roda Roda" Automobile Museum.

== Transport ==
The province is served by Lleida–Alguaire Airport which provides direct routes to the Balearic Islands which are operated by Iberia. However, Josep Tarradellas Barcelona–El Prat Airport is also frequently used by air travellers from the province which provides most domestic and international destinations. It is located 154 km (96 mi) south east of Lleida.

== Sport ==
The comarques (local districts) of Lleida are also market leaders within Spain in the provision of adventure sports, with more than 170 companies organising around fifty different activities on land and water and in the air. This area is also Spain's leading ski destination.

Lleida has 11 different ski resorts which are marketed under the brand "Neu de Lleida" (Lleida Snow) and offer over 450 km (280 mi) of ski slopes. Their 81 ski lifts have the capacity to carry 115,000 skiers per hour, while the area immediately surrounding these winter sports complexes can also accommodate more than 30,000 visitors.

== See also ==
- Llista de monuments de Lleida
