= L'Espluga Calba =

- Municipality
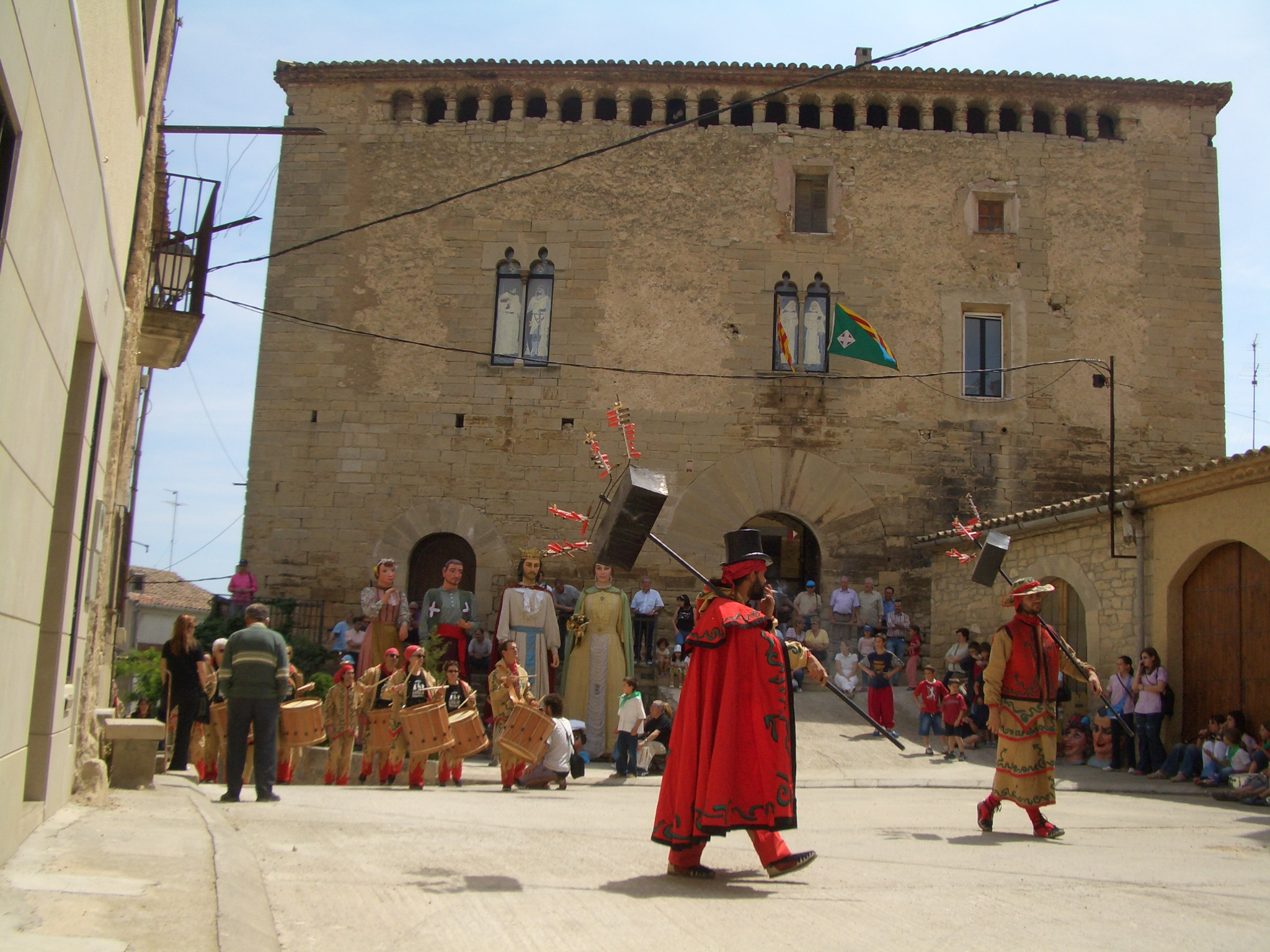
- Espluga Calba castle

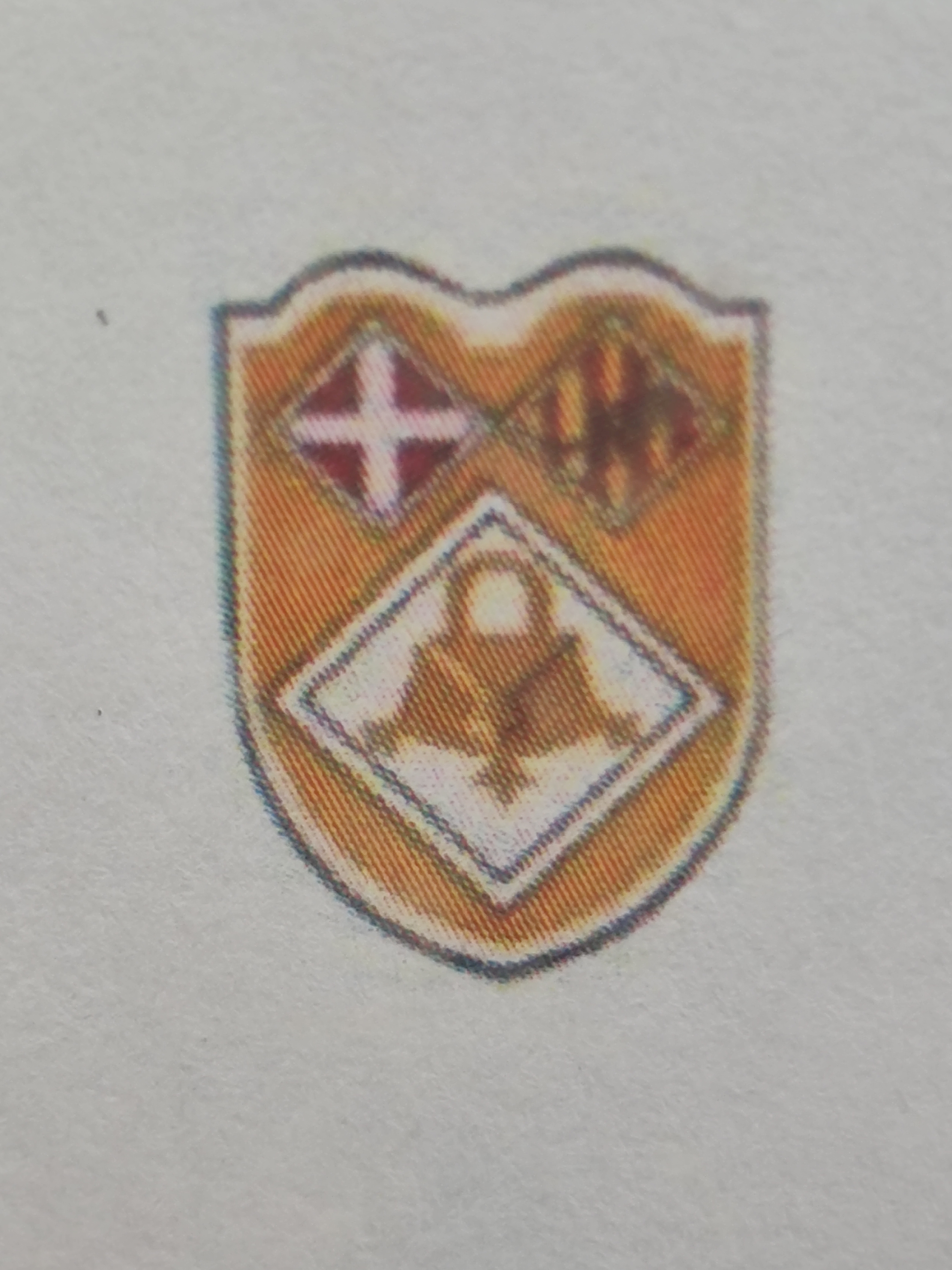
- Coat of arms

- Location in Catalonia
- Coordinates: 41°29′48″N 1°0′21″E
- Country: Spain
- Community: Catalonia
- Province: Lleida
- Comarca: Garrigues

Government
  - Mayor: Josep Cunillera Boldú (2015)

Area
  - Total: 21.5 km^{2} (8.3 sq mi)
- Elevation: 434 m (1,424 ft)

Population (2025-01-01)
  - Total: 324
  - Density: 15.1/km^{2} (39.0/sq mi)
- Website: esplugacalba.ddl.net

L'Espluga Calba (Catalan pronunciation: [lasˈpluɣa ˈkalβa]) is a village and municipality in the province of Lleida and autonomous community of Catalonia, Spain. It has a population of 324 (register office, 2025).
