= Tarrés =

- Municipality
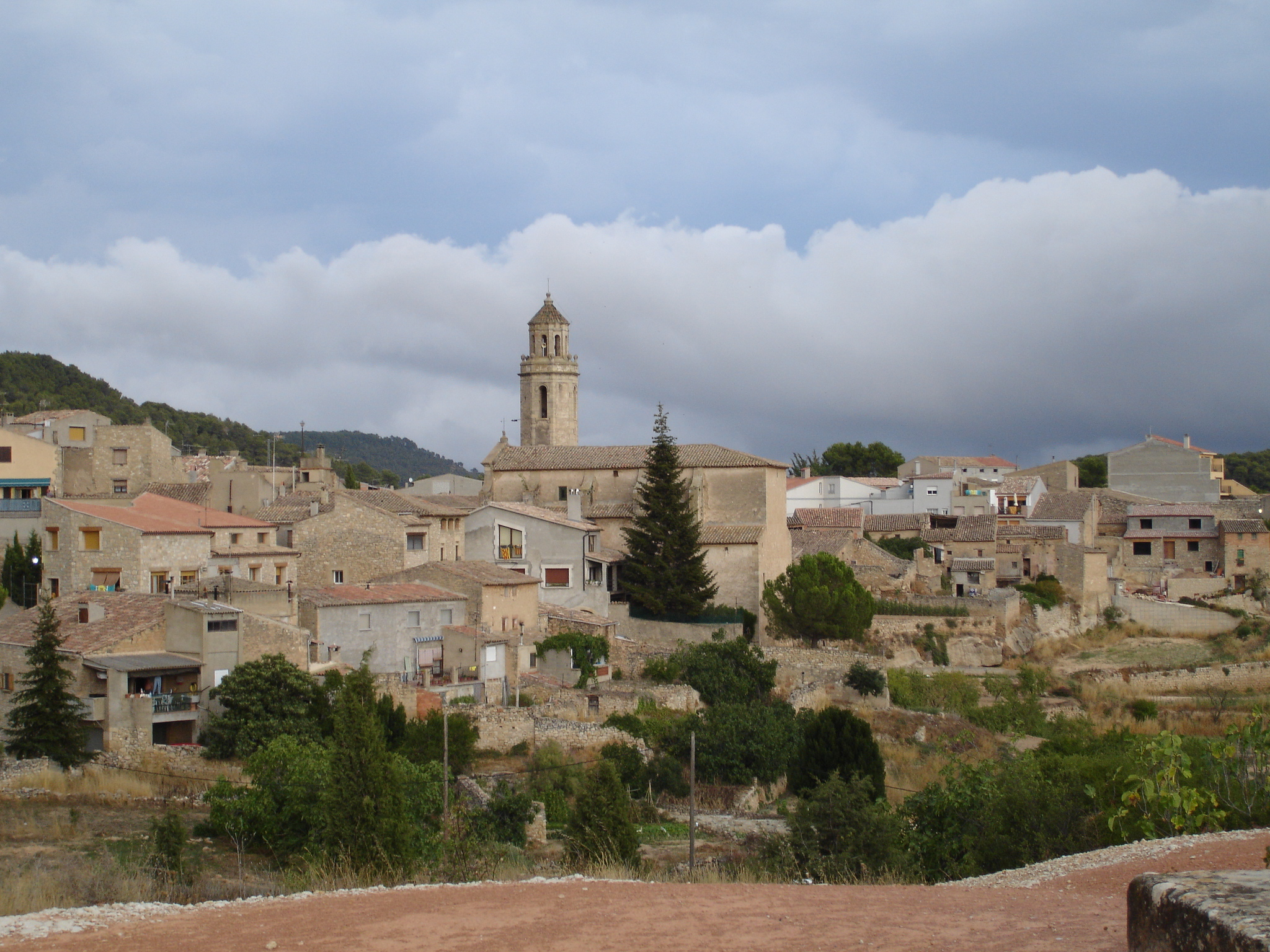
- Tarrés

- Flag Coat of arms

- Location in Catalonia
- Coordinates: 41°25′N 1°1′E
- Country: Spain
- Community: Catalonia
- Province: Lleida
- Comarca: Garrigues

Government
  - Mayor: Ramon Arbós Palau (2015)

Area
  - Total: 13.0 km^{2} (5.0 sq mi)

Population (2025-01-01)
  - Total: 126
  - Density: 9.69/km^{2} (25.1/sq mi)
- Website: tarres.cat

Tarrés (Catalan pronunciation: [taˈres]) is a village in the province of Lleida and autonomous community of Catalonia, Spain. It has a population of 126 (register office, 2025).
