= El Vilosell =

- Municipality
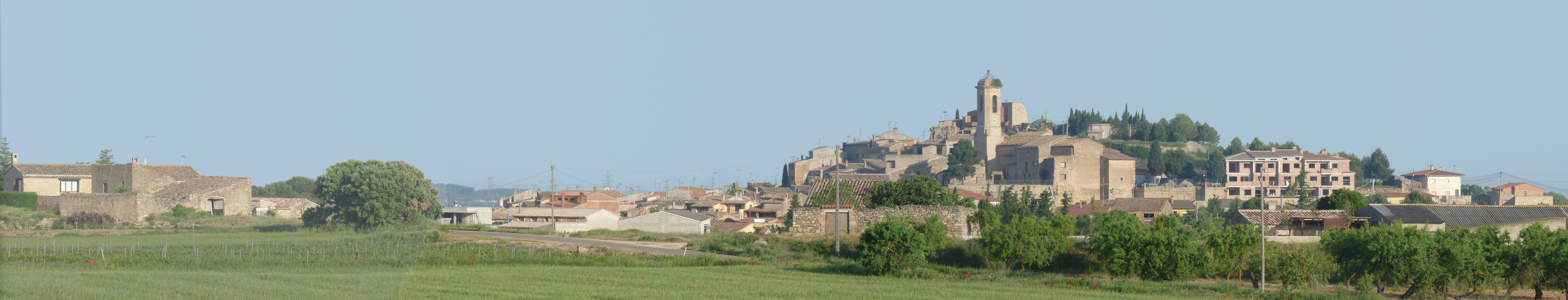

- Flag Coat of arms

- Location in Catalonia
- Coordinates: 41°23′2″N 0°56′48″E
- Country: Spain
- Community: Catalonia
- Province: Lleida
- Comarca: Garrigues

Government
  - Mayor: Jordi Nogué Estradé (2015)

Area
  - Total: 18.9 km^{2} (7.3 sq mi)

Population (2025-01-01)
  - Total: 177
  - Density: 9.37/km^{2} (24.3/sq mi)
- Website: vilosell.cat

El Vilosell (Catalan pronunciation: [el βiloˈzeʎ]) is a village in the province of Lleida and autonomous community of Catalonia, Spain. It has a population of 177 (register office, 2025).
