= L'Albi =

- Municipality
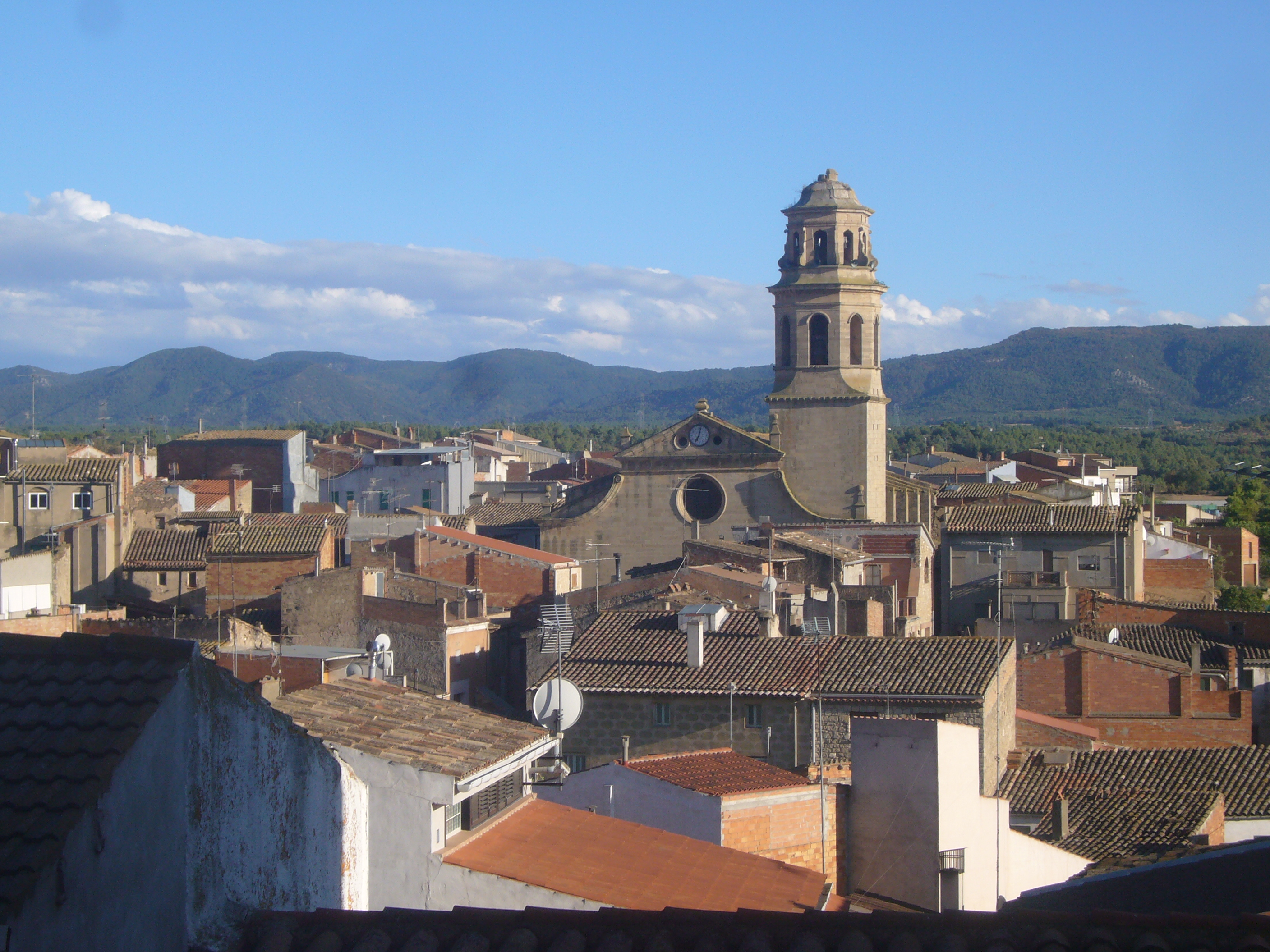
- L'Albi

- Coat of arms

- Location in Catalonia
- Coordinates: 41°25′30″N 0°56′19″E
- Country: Spain
- Community: Catalonia
- Province: Lleida
- Comarca: Garrigues

Government
  - Mayor: Anna Feliu Moragues (2015)

Area
  - Total: 32.5 km^{2} (12.5 sq mi)
- Elevation: 526 m (1,726 ft)

Population (2025-01-01)
  - Total: 764
  - Density: 23.5/km^{2} (60.9/sq mi)
- Website: albi.cat

L'Albi (Catalan pronunciation: [ˈlalβi]) is a village in the province of Lleida and autonomous community of Catalonia, Spain. It has a population of 764 (register office, 2025).
