= Les Borges Blanques =

- Municipality
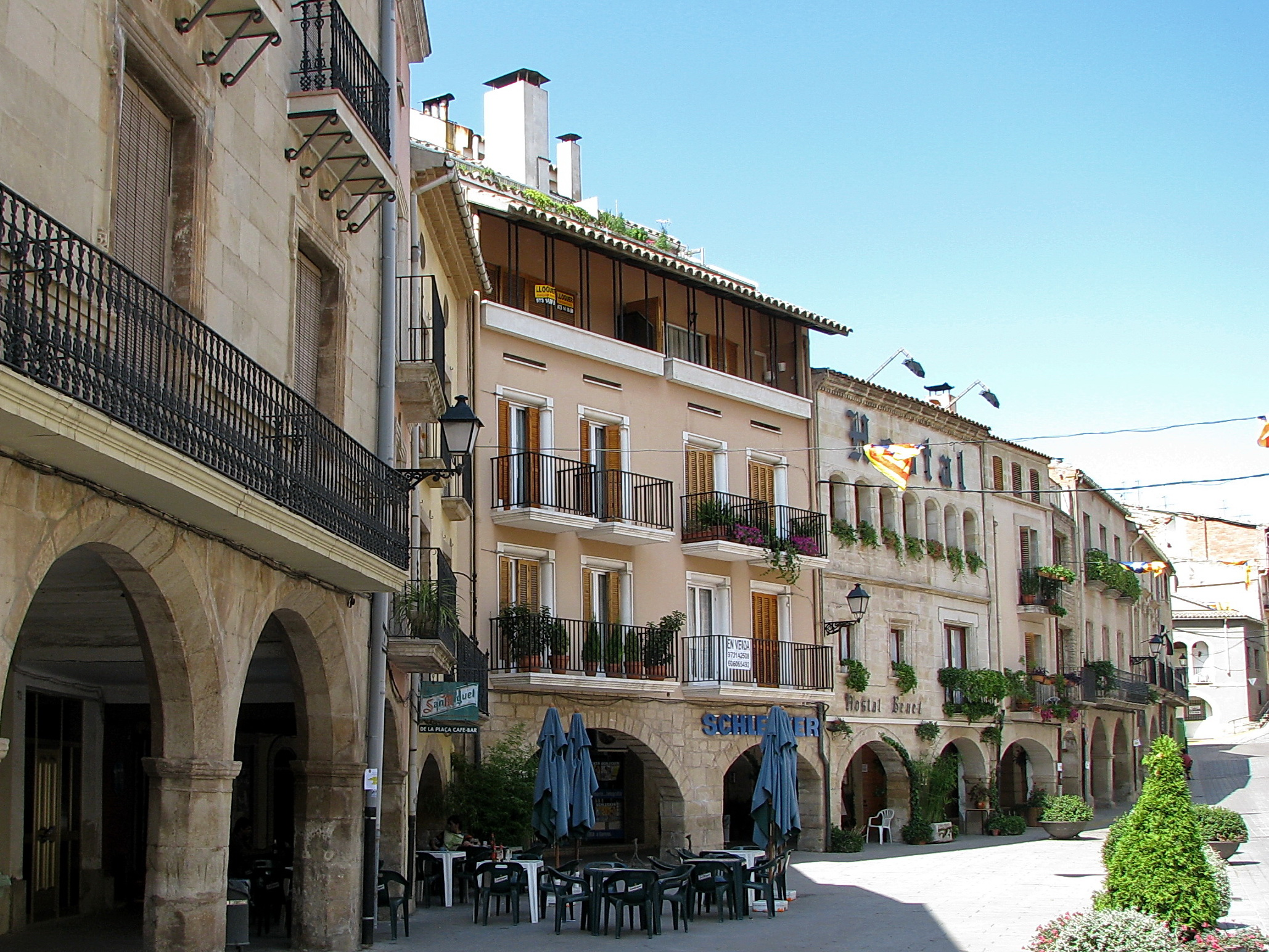
- Main Square

- Flag Coat of arms

- Location in Province of Lleida Location in Catalonia Location in Spain
- Coordinates: 41°31′10″N 0°52′6″E
- Country: Spain
- Community: Catalonia
- Province: Lleida
- Comarca: Les Garrigues

Government
  - Mayor: Enric Mir Pifarré (2015)

Area
  - Total: 61.5 km^{2} (23.7 sq mi)
- Elevation: 304 m (997 ft)

Population (2025-01-01)
  - Total: 6,482
  - Density: 105/km^{2} (273/sq mi)
- Climate: Cfa
- Website: www.lesborgesblanques.cat

Les Borges Blanques (Catalan pronunciation: [lez ˈβɔɾdʒez ˈβlaŋkes]) is the capital of the comarca of Les Garrigues, in the province of Lleida, Catalonia, Spain. According to the 2014 census, the municipality has a population of 6,482 (register office, 2025).

== Geography ==
It lies in the southern sector of the central Catalan depression, near the zone watered by the Urgell canal. The high plateaus are covered by olive groves. The economy is agricultural, and Les Borges Blanques is a major producer of olives, in particular a variety known as arbequina which produces a highly prized oil. The cooperative movement has strong roots in the area. There is little or no tourist infrastructure. The municipality is split into two parts, separated by Juneda municipality, the bigger eastern part having almost all the population.

The traditional symbol of this city is an ox, which appears on a widely used but unofficial coat of arms.

== Notable people ==
- Francesc Queralt, composer
