= La Floresta, Spain =

La Floresta
- Municipality
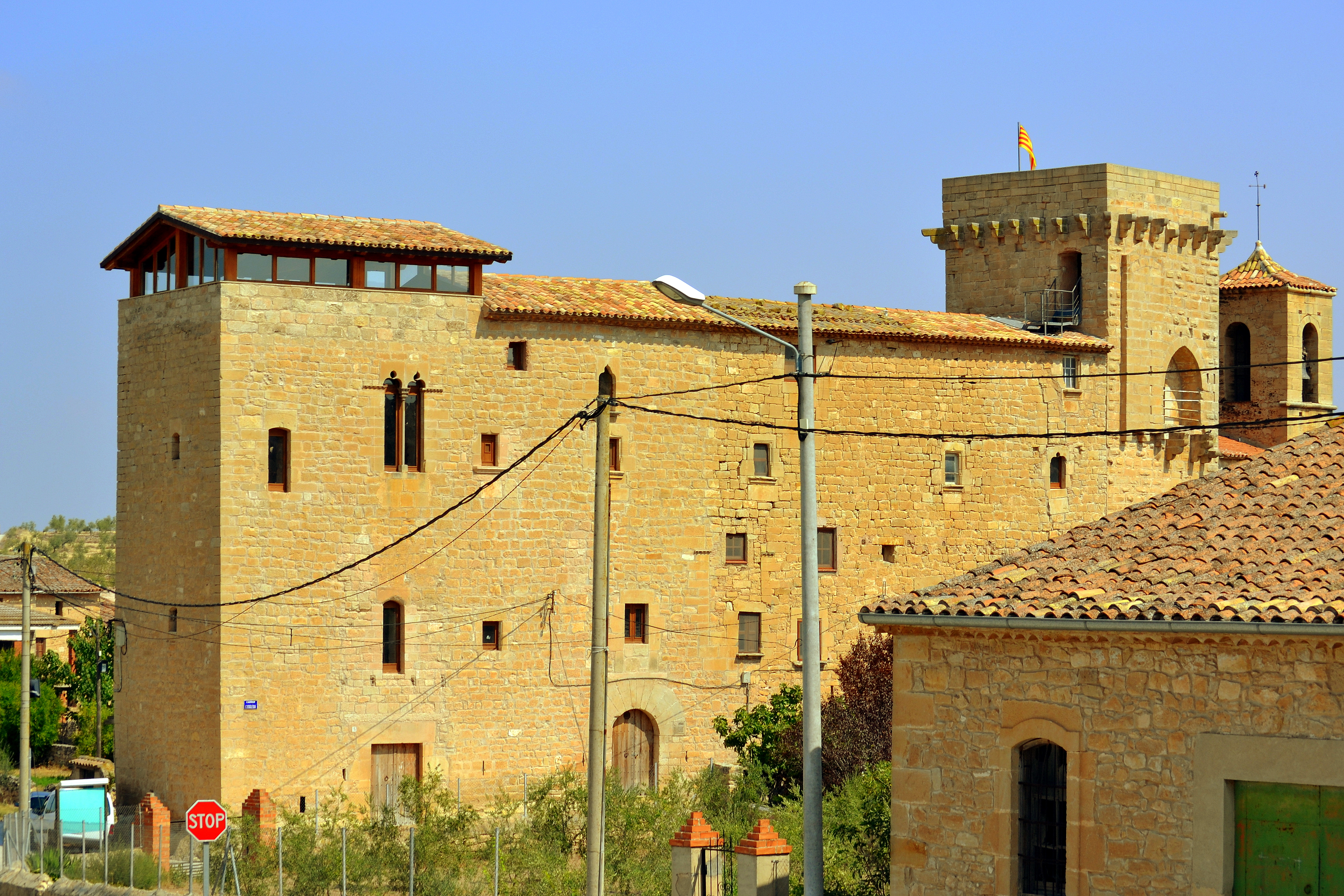
- La Floresta castle

- Flag Coat of arms

- Location in Catalonia
- Coordinates: 41.512°N 0.921°E
- Country: Spain
- Community: Catalonia
- Province: Lleida
- Comarca: Garrigues

Government
  - Mayor: Arnau Salat (2025)

Area
  - Total: 5.5 km^{2} (2.1 sq mi)
- Elevation: 316 m (1,037 ft)

Population (2025-01-01)
  - Total: 159
  - Density: 29/km^{2} (75/sq mi)
- Website: floresta.cat

La Floresta (Catalan pronunciation: [la floˈɾestɛ]) is a village in the province of Lleida and autonomous community of Catalonia, Spain. It has a population of 159 (register office, 2025).
