= Juneda =

- Municipality
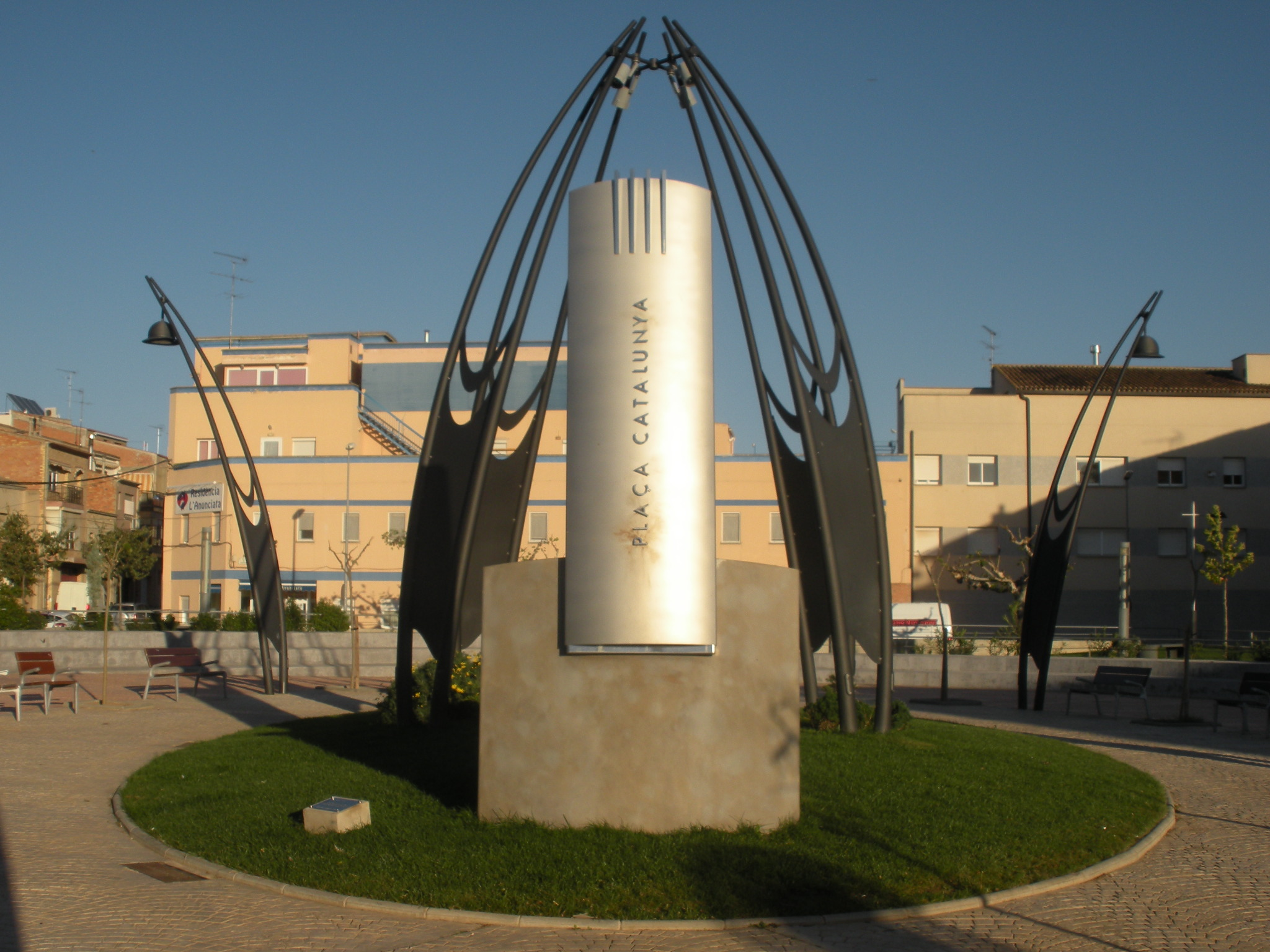
- Catalonia Square in Juneda

- Flag Coat of arms

- Location in Catalonia
- Coordinates: 41.546°N 0.827°E
- Country: Spain
- Community: Catalonia
- Province: Lleida
- Comarca: Garrigues

Government
  - Mayor: Antoni Villas Miranda (2015)

Area
  - Total: 47.3 km^{2} (18.3 sq mi)
- Elevation: 264 m (866 ft)

Population (2025-01-01)
  - Total: 3,453
  - Density: 73.0/km^{2} (189/sq mi)
- Website: www.juneda.cat

Juneda (Catalan pronunciation: [dʒuˈneðɛ]) is a village in the province of Lleida and autonomous community of Catalonia, Spain. The municipality is split into two parts, the bigger southern part having almost all the population. It has a population of 3,453 (register office, 2025).
