= Aniol =

Aniol is a name, and may refer to:

== Surname ==
- Hans Aniol, German swimmer
- Katarzyna Gajgał-Anioł (born 1981), Polish volleyball player
- Peter Aniol (1938–2015), German politician
- Wolf Aniol (born 1944), German actor

== Given name ==
- Aniol Rafel (born 1977), Catalan editor and publisher
- Anioł Dowgird (1776–1835), philosopher of the Polish and Lithuanian enlightenment

== Places ==
- Sant Aniol d'Aguja, a Benedictine monastery in Catalonia, Spain
- Sant Aniol de Finestres, a municipality in the comarca of Garrotxa, Catalonia, Spain
