= La Vall de Bianya =

- Municipality
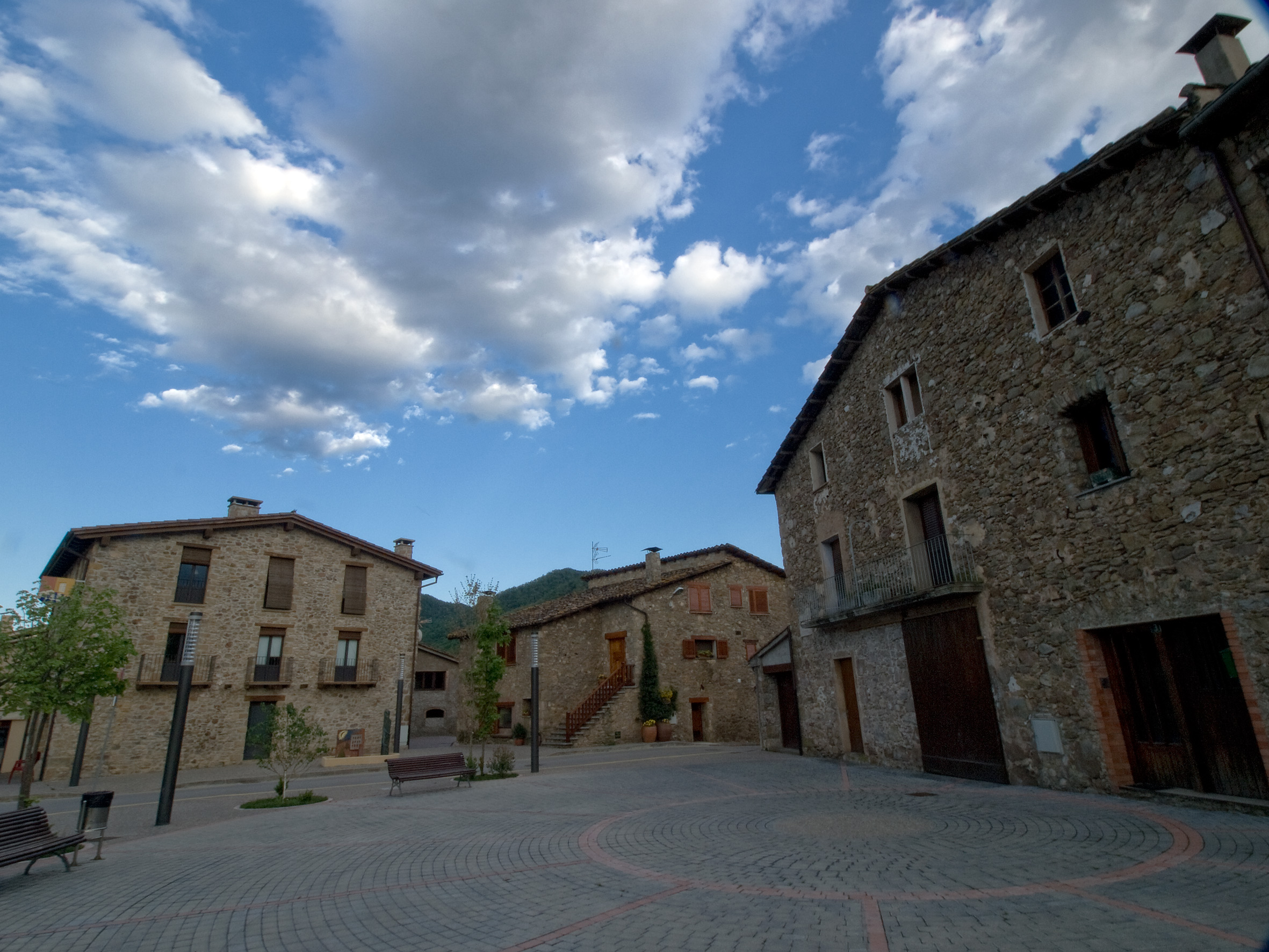
- L'Hostalnou de Bianya

- Flag Coat of arms
- Nickname: La vall dels sentits (The valley of the senses)
- Location in Catalonia
- Coordinates: 42°12′46″N 2°27′13″E
- Country: Catalonia
- Comarca: Garrotxa

Government
  - Mayor: Santi Reixach Garriga (2015)

Area
  - Total: 93.6 km^{2} (36.1 sq mi)
- Elevation: 480 m (1,570 ft)

Population (2025-01-01)
  - Total: 1,347
  - Density: 14.4/km^{2} (37.3/sq mi)
- Demonym(s): Bianyenc, bianyenca
- Postal codes: 17813, 17858 (only for La Canya).
- Website: valldebianya.cat

La Vall de Bianya (Catalan pronunciation: [lə ˈβaʎ ðə βiˈaɲə]) is a municipality of the comarca of Garrotxa, Catalonia. It is formed by eleven villages scattered around the Bianya and Bac valleys. The seat of the municipal government is in L'Hostalnou de Bianya, and the village with more inhabitants is La Canya. This latter village is divided between the municipalities of La Vall de Bianya and Sant Joan les Fonts. The municipality is part of the Zona Volcànica de la Garrotxa Natural Park and the Alta Garrotxa Consortium.

== Etymology ==
La Vall de Bianya can be literally translated from Catalan as Valley of Bianya. The name is a reference to the Bianya valley, the most important landform of the municipality.

Throughout history, the word Bianya has been written with B and V (Vianya). The oldest reference to the name is from the year 958 (Vallebiania), which changed later to Bianna (1117), Bisania (1319) and finally, Bianya. During the 19th century the form Vianya was also used. The form with V became the most used until the Second Spanish Republic, when Bianya was recovered. In July 1939 Vianya was used again. Finally, with the Spanish transition to democracy, Bianya was established as the official and correct form of the name.

The origin of the name Bianya is not clear, with two main hypotheses (linked to the V and the B, respectively):

- Vianya would originate from the Latin Via Annia. The ancient Romans would have given this name to the Roman road crossing the municipality. An important part of this road is still conserved nowadays and can be visited.
- Bianya would mean two rivers, in reference to the streams of Sant Ponç d'Aulina and Santa Llúcia de Puigmal. Those streams come together in Ca l'Enric and since that point the single stream is called Bianya stream. This hypothesis originates from 18th century documents that called the place Bisania. Bis would indicate repetition and ania would origin from the Latin amnis, which means river. However, documentation of the name prior to this century does not use the prefix Bis, but Bi.

Other less-accepted theories relate the name with the Celtic place name Vianna (which has been conserved as Vienne in a lot of French places), with the personal name Albiniana, or with the Arabic anthroponym Abu Gàniya.

== Geography and climate ==
The municipality is very mountainous. The main landform is the Bianya valley, which is drained by the Bianya stream (formed by the streams of Sant Ponç d'Aulina and Santa Llúcia de Puigmal). The Bianya valley is surrounded by the Les Cambres range to the west, the Malforat and Sant Tomàs ranges to the north, the Cau hillside in the west, and the Sant Miquel del Mont range to the south. The municipal area also contains the Bac valley, located at the headwaters of the Oix and Castellar de la Muntanya streams. The municipality also includes the enclave of La Canya, a village split between La Vall de Bianya and Sant Joan les Fonts.

- Villages of La Vall de Bianya
La Canya	562 inhabitants
Capsec	101
Castellar de la Muntanya	12
L'Hostalnou de Bianya	105
Llocalou	175
Sant Andreu de Socarrats	46
Sant Martí del Clot	35
Sant Pere Despuig	92
Sant Salvador de Bianya	75
Santa Margarida de Bianya	77
La Vall del Bac	36

The municipality borders to the north (from east to west) with the Serres Blanques mountain, the Les Ginebres range, and the mountains of L'Ou and El Talló; to the south with the ranges of Sant Miquel del Mont and Sant Valentí; to the east with the ranges of Vivers and Els Gats; and to the west with the ranges of Capsacosta and Les Cambres.

La Canya enclave borders to the east with the Aiguanegra range, to the west with the Sant Valentí range, to the north with the part of La Canya that belongs to Sant Joan les Fonts, and to the south with the part of this village that belongs to Olot.

The woods that can be found in the municipality are mainly from downy oaks, holly oaks and Scots pines. The pastures occupy around 7.000 hectares.

La Vall de Bianya is the second municipality of Garrotxa with the largest area, after Montagut i Oix. This is reflected by the high amount of villages that belong to the municipality, which are mainly disperse and centered around a church. The only non-disperse villages are L'Hostalnou de Bianya (municipal capital), La Canya (most populated village) and Llocalou.

The climate from La Vall de Bianya is mediterranean with a certain continentality. It rains quite often throughout the year, but especially during spring (usual in all Garrotxa). Although temperatures are smooth, frost is common during winter, and during summer nights are fresh and pleasant.

== Population ==
Population census

Year	Pop.	±% p.a.
1717	826	—
1787	1,360	+0.71%
1857	2,886	+1.08%
1877	2,340	−1.04%
1887	2,180	−0.71%
1900	2,142	−0.14%

Year	Pop.	±% p.a.
1910	2,168	+0.12%
1920	2,277	+0.49%
1930	2,314	+0.16%
1940	2,024	−1.33%
1950	1,797	−1.18%
1960	1,615	−1.06%

Year	Pop.	±% p.a.
1970	1,460	−1.00%
1981	1,121	−2.37%
1990	1,067	−0.55%
1992	1,039	−1.32%
1994	1,070	+1.48%
1996	1,076	+0.28%

Year	Pop.	±% p.a.
1998	1,129	+2.43%
2000	1,130	+0.04%
2002	1,158	+1.23%
2004	1,214	+2.39%
2006	1,256	+1.72%
2008	1,307	+2.01%

Year	Pop.	±% p.a.
2009	1,321	+1.07%
2010	1,320	−0.08%
2012	1,335	+0.57%
2014	1,305	−1.13%
2016	1,266	−1.51%

== History ==
The territory which nowadays forms the municipality of La Vall de Bianya was part of the County of Besalú. The County organized the territory in villas or rural districts (where big stately houses were built), and in villare (big country houses for farmers). The Bianya family, which lived in a stately house near the Sant Pere Despuig church, had a free allodium in the actual territory of La Vall de Bianya. In fact, the Bianya family built the Sant Pere Despuig church, which was consecrated in the year 964. Afterwards, Bianya's stately house was sold to the Soler family from Camprodon, then to the Camprodon monastery and finally, the monastery sold it to the Corona family in 1396. Those stately areas created in the period of the County of Besalú coexisted with the old ecclesiastical areas (parishes). The parishes were the origin of the vast majority of the villages that form the actual municipality of La Vall de Bianya.

In 1396, the king Martin the Humane incorporated to the Crown of Aragon the parishes of Santa Margarida de Bianya, Sant Pere Despuig, Sant Martí de Solamal, Sant Martí de Capsec, Sant Andreu de Socarrats and Les Illes (old name of La Canya). The big earthquakes that occurred in Garrotxa during the 15th century affected La Vall de Bianya, with a lot of casualties and completely destroying the churches of Santa Maria de Llongarriu (La Vall del Bac), Sant Martí de Capsec, Sant Pere Despuig, Sant Martí de Solamal and Sant Salvador de Bianya. The rest of La Vall de Bianya churches suffered important damages.

In 1497 La Vall de Bianya had eleven parishes: Capsec, Castellar de la Muntanya, Sant Andreu de Porreres, Sant Andreu de Socarrats, Sant Martí de Solamal, Sant Martí del Clot, Sant Miquel de la Torre (also called Avellana Corba), Sant Pere Despuig, Sant Salvador de Bianya, Santa Margarida de Bianya, Santa Maria Sacot, and La Vall del Bac. During the Late Middle Ages, the parishes of Capsec, Santa Margarida de Bianya, Sant Pere Despuig, Sant Martí de Solamal and Sant Andreu de Socarrats, and the village of Les Illes formed an institution called Consell General de la Vall de Bianya or Universitat de Bianya. This institution had the objective of administrating the residents' taxes. The institution was formed by two representatives from each parish or village, which were elected for a year every New Year's Eve together with the mostassaf.

The Consell General de la Vall de Bianya was the precedent of the current municipality, which was formed after merging the old parishes to the original Capsec parish. Those mergings were caused by administrative restructuring. In 1553 Avellana Corba was merged to Capsec. In 1716, the Nueva Planta decrees created the new municipal structures, which caused the formation of eight municipalities in the current territory of La Vall de Bianya: Capsec, Castellar de la Muntanya, Sant Martí del Clot, Santa Margarida de Bianya, Sant Pere Despuig, Sant Salvador de Bianya, Socarrats (which included the village of Les Illes) and La Vall del Bac. In comparison with the old parishes, only three parishes were absorbed by those municipalities: Sant Andreu de Porreres, Sant Martí de Solamal and Santa Maria Sacot.

The new Spanish Constitution of 1869 caused another administrative reform in 1870 which provoked the fusion of six municipalities to Capsec in 1875: Castellar de la Muntanya, Socarrats, Sant Martí del Clot, Sant Pere Despuig, Santa Margarida de Bianya and La Vall del Bac. After all the mergings, only two municipalities were left in the actual territory of La Vall de Bianya: Sant Salvador de Bianya and Capsec. This later municipality was called Vall de Bianya during the 19th century. In December 1909 and July 1911 the citizens of Capsec demanded the municipality to be called Vall de Bianya again. In 1917 the name of the municipality was changed, and the seat of the municipal government was moved from Capsec to L'Hostalnou de Bianya, village which is very close to the Santa Margarida de Bianya church.

During the Spanish Civil War a lot of churches from the old municipalities of La Vall de Bianya (Capsec) and Sant Salvador were burned. The historical documents and the old parish registers were also lost, except the ones of Sant Salvador de Bianya, Sant Martí de Capsec, Santa Maria de Castellar de la Muntanya and La Vall del Bac. The image of Santa Margarida from the church with the same name and the Baroque altarpiece of the Santa Magdalena del Coll church were saved, not like a significant amount of valuable historic-artistical pieces like the ones from the Sant Salvador de Bianya church, which was used as a slaughterhouse during the war. The municipality of Sant Salvador de Bianya changed its name to Els Hostalets de Capsacosta because of religious connotations, and services and industries were collectivized.

At the end of the war, the Francoists easily took the control of the municipal governments of La Vall de Bianya and Sant Salvador de Bianya, although its troops did not enter their territory. One of the first priorities of the regime was to recover the churches destroyed during the war. During the 1950s, there was a gradual economic recovery which allowed building several bridges which improved the communications between the different villages and isolated country houses of La Vall de Bianya. During the 1960s the urbanizations of La Canya, Llocalou and L'Hostalnou were built. In 1968, the new church of La Canya was built.

The municipality reached its current extension in 1970, when Sant Salvador de Bianya was merged to La Vall de Bianya (Capsec). The proposed merging project, presented in February 1968, also included Sant Pau de Segúries, but the local authorities rejected the merging with this municipality. In 1973 Montserrat Reixach became the mayor of La Vall de Bianya. She was one of the first Catalan women to become mayor; and her office coincided with the Spanish transition to democracy.

The first mayor after the return to democracy was Ernest Nogareda. To stop the emigration of inhabitants to other municipalities, in 1984 and 1985 the urbanizations of L'Hostalnou de Bianya and Llocalou started to be built, respectively. In 1993 the community center of L'Hostalnou was built, and the town hall was revamped. In 1994 the new Capsacosta tunnels were opened, causing a significant improvement in the connection between Garrotxa and Ripollès. The building of these tunnels allowed the discovery of a natural spring, and in 1996 a project divided in different phases started to take advantage of this water. In 2016 the project was finished, split in nine phases executed during the office of three different mayors. This project has allowed provision of water to the 90% of the municipality only with this natural spring.
