= Battle of Sant Esteve d'en Bas =

1695 Nine Years' War battle

- Part of the Nine Years' War
Date	10 March 1695
Location	La Vall d'en Bas and Olot, Catalonia, Spain
Result	Spanish victory

Belligerents
France	Spanish Empire

Commanders and leaders
(Kingdom of France) Urbain Le Clerc de Juigné (DOW)	(Spanish Empire) Ramon de Sala i Saçala

Strength
French claim: 600–800 men Spanish claim: 1,300 men	French claim: more than 700 men Spanish claim: 650 men

Casualties and losses
French claim: 600–700 killed or captured Spanish claim: 1,086 killed or captured	Spanish claim: 7 killed 5 wounded

The Battle of Sant Esteve d'en Bas took place on 10 March 1695 in the Catalan front of the War of the Grand Alliance. It was fought between a column of French regular infantry under Brigadier Urbain Le Clerc de Juigné, governor of the nearby French-occupied Castellfollit de la Roca, and 16 companies of Catalan miquelets along with several armed peasants at the orders of Ramon de Sala i Saçala, the veguer of the town of Vic. Juigné's force was on a punitive expedition to burn the village of Sant Esteve d'en Bas, whose inhabitants had refused to pay war contributions to the French army, when it was attacked by the Catalan militia and nearly destroyed in two separate engagements.

The first and more bloody fight took place in the woods of Malatosquera and on the bridge of Sant Roc, where the French suffered heavy losses. Defeated, Juigné and his remaining troops fled to Olot, where they entrenched themselves in a convent. The Catalans forced the French to surrender by setting the building on fire. This French defeat was followed a month later by the blockade of the French garrisons of Castellfollit and Hostalric by Spanish troops: miquelets and armed peasants. The French command decided to demolish and evacuate the garrisons in July due to the impossibility of keeping both positions.

== Background ==
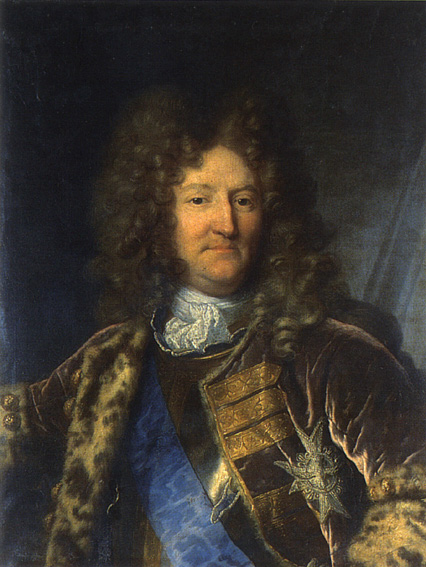
Portrait of Anne Jules de Noailles by Hyacinthe Rigaud, 1691. Grenoble, musée des Beaux-arts

Catalonia was one of the main fronts of the Nine Years' War. For Duke of Villahermosa, the Spanish Viceroy of Catalonia, the early stage of the conflict was marked by a lack of resources and poor relations with the peasantry due to the Revolt of the Barretinas. In 1689 the Admiral of Castile, Juan Gaspar Enríquez de Cabrera, said to the Spanish Council of State that the best relief that Catalonia could have would be external support, which could come from Flanders, Milan or Navarre. The French army under the Duke of Noailles, however, was also short of resources, and attrition warfare prevailed on the first four years of the war. In 1694, Louis XIV committed more resources to his army in Catalonia, and Noailles managed to break the Spanish defenses, defeating the Spanish army at the battle of Torroella, on the banks of the Ter river, and seizing the ports of Roses, Palamós and Cadaqués, as well as the city of Girona.

In 1695 the French command found that the inhabitants of the areas occupied by the French army were reluctant to pay war contributions and started to oppose an organised and increasingly successful resistance. During the winter of 1694-1695, the inhabitants of Calella repelled a punitive force of 800 or 1,000 French soldiers from the Blanes garrison and killed between 60 or 100 of them. French troops were also harassed by Catalan militia forces, the miquelets, who laid ambushes for Noailles' forces from woods and high ground. One of the most effective leaders of the miquelets was Captain Ramon de Sala i Saçala, the veguer of Vic, who achieved two victories over the French during the winter: in late December he overran a convoy on way to Hostalric, killing 25 French soldiers and taking 25 prisoners, and on 24 February he defeated a company of French dragoons at Navata, killing 7 of them and taking 28 prisoners and 32 horses.

One of the villages that refused to pay the French was Sant Esteve d'en Bas. Despite a French party looting the village as punishment, the inhabitants still refused to obey. A force of 700 soldiers was dispatched on 28 December to arrest the aldermen, but they found the village abandoned and sacked it again, taking with them two priests as hostages. In March 1695, as the locals were still rebellious, Monsieur de Saint-Sylvestre, the French governor of Girona, ordered Brigadier Juigné, commander of the garrison of Castellfollit, to punish the village for the third time. To do this, he was given command of an army from his own garrison and those of Figueres, Banyoles and Besalú. These troops were taken from the German Alsace regiment, the Swiss Manuel and Schellenberg regiments, and the French Royal-Artillery regiment. Philippe de Courcillon, a famous French diarist, labeled them as "of the best troops of that country".

== Battle ==
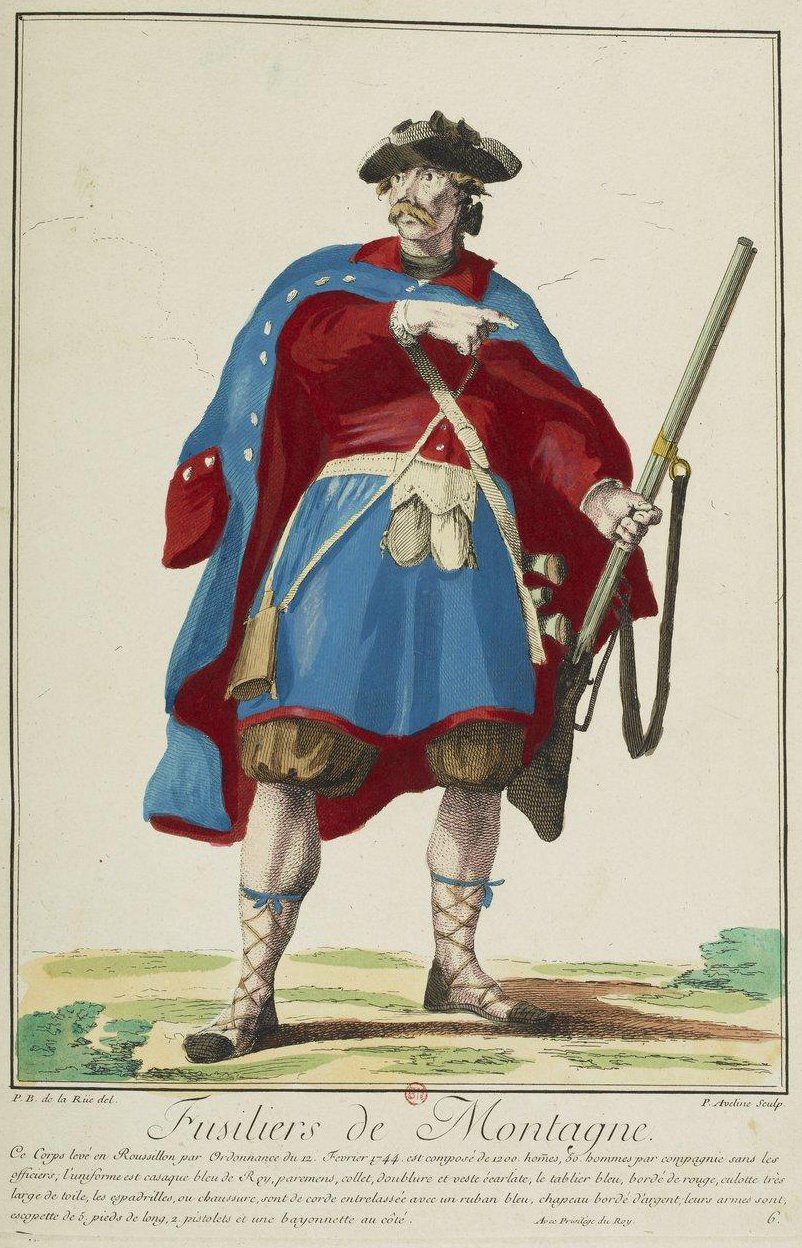
18th-century illustration of a miquelet

The French forces left Castellfollit on the evening of 9 March, passed at some distance from Olot and spent the night at the palanca de Cudella, a ford on the Fluvià river. At dawn, some peasants and miquelets discovered them and sent a warning to Sant Esteve d'en Bas. Women and children sought shelter in the surrounding mountains, while the men prepared to fight off the French column. They also called for help from Ramon de Sala i Saçala, who was at the nearby village of Sant Feliu de Pallerols, with Captains Josep Mas de Roda and Pere Baliart i Teula, recruiting men to raise three new companies of miquelets. In the meantime, Juigné reached la Vall d'en Bas –the Bas valley–, leaving a rearguard at El Mallol, and took positions on the hill of Puigpardines. From there, he dispatched a third of his force to burn Sant Esteve. The French troops had burned 16 buildings when Ramon de Sala, at the head of 8 companies of miquelets, and Pere Baliart, leading 8 others, arrived at the village and forced them to flee to Juigné's position.

At the hill of Puigpardines, Juigné was being already harassed by 80 armed peasants of the local sometent, –a type of militia–, when the arrival of Sala's, Mas' and Baliart's miquelets convinced him to withdraw. When they tried to cross back the Fluvià, however, they found the way blocked. Juigné then decided to attempt to escape to Olot through the woods of Malatosquera and across the bridge of Sant Roc, but the Catalans anticipated him. Sala divided his miquelets into two groups of 300 men each, and while Josep Mas de Roda, leading the first, pursued and attacked the French troops in the woods, he blocked the bridge of Sant Roc ahead of the second group. During the running fight under the trees Juigné's force lost 25 men and abandoned part of its ammunition.

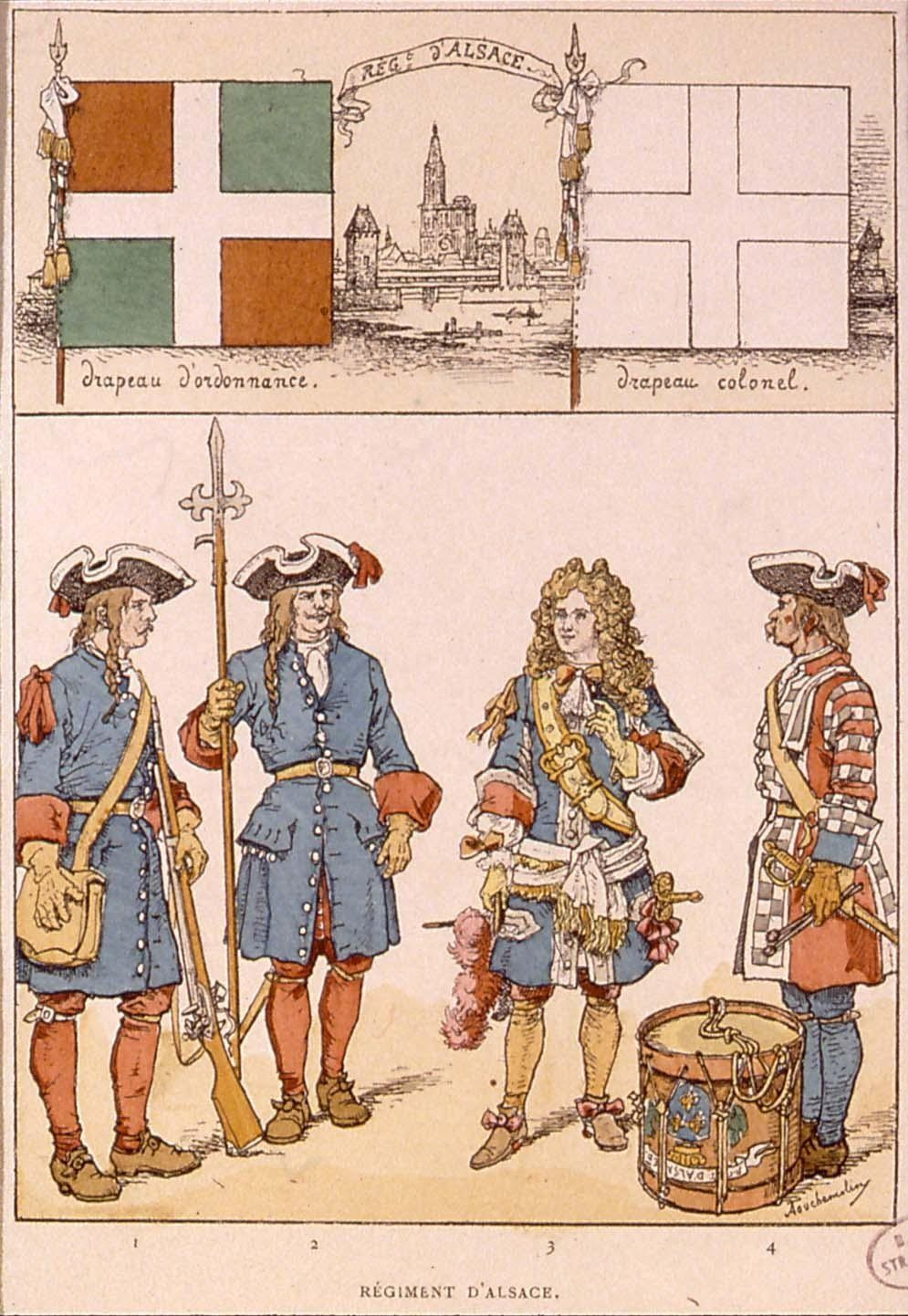
Grenadier, sergeant, officer and drummer of the régiment d'Alsace in 1696, by Alfred Touchemolin

The French column, despite the harassment, managed to take control of the bridge and started to cross to the opposite bank of the Fluvià. However, the miquelets and armed peasants fired on them from the south and killed up to 70 French soldiers. According to Charles Sevin de Quincy, a contemporary French artillery general and military historian of Louis XIV's reign, Juigné's corps was able to retreat to Olot in good order. On the other hand, the local 19th-century Catalan historian Esteve Paluzie i Cantalozella claimed that the French troops fled in disarray, leaving 150 prisoners to the Catalans, which they took to Sant Esteve d'en Bas under a heavy escort.

Arriving in Olot, most of Juigné's force took positions inside the convent of El Carme, while 90 Swiss soldiers of the rear entrenched themselves inside the village hospital. While the Swiss troops promptly surrendered, the bulk of the French column, with Juigné himself, held out for two hours. The miquelets and peasants encircled the building and managed to open a gap in its walls, only to be repelled in hand-to-hand fighting, losing two men killed and one wounded. Sala's men then breached the wall of a chapel and stormed the convent again, but as the French were well grouped within, this assault was also repelled. Sala ordered that the gates of the building be set on fire, but the French blocked the gap using stones and bricks. The Catalans managed to enter the building by igniting large amounts of pitch and sulfur on the two breaches they had opened. The fire and the smoke blinded and choked the French soldiers, who retreated to the convent's cloister. After that, Juigné, seriously wounded during the fight, requested terms and surrendered.

== Aftermath ==
The French column surrendered on the promise that the officers would not be stripped, but they all remained as prisoners of war and surrendered their weapons and money to the Catalans. Juigné, with 136 other wounded soldiers and a German captain, remained in Olot to receive medical treatment, but he died shortly after. Spain claimed French losses amounted to between 251 and 260 men killed, including 32 officers, and 826 prisoners, while the miquelets side suffered only 7 men killed and 5 "miquelets" wounded. In this letter, Desgrigny noted that Monsieur Juigné was lucky to be dead, as the defeat would probably have cost him dearly. 690 unscathed French prisoners were taken first to Vic and later to Barcelona, where they arrived on 15 March. Their arrival was seen by the Spanish Viceroy, the Marquis of Gastañaga and a large crowd.

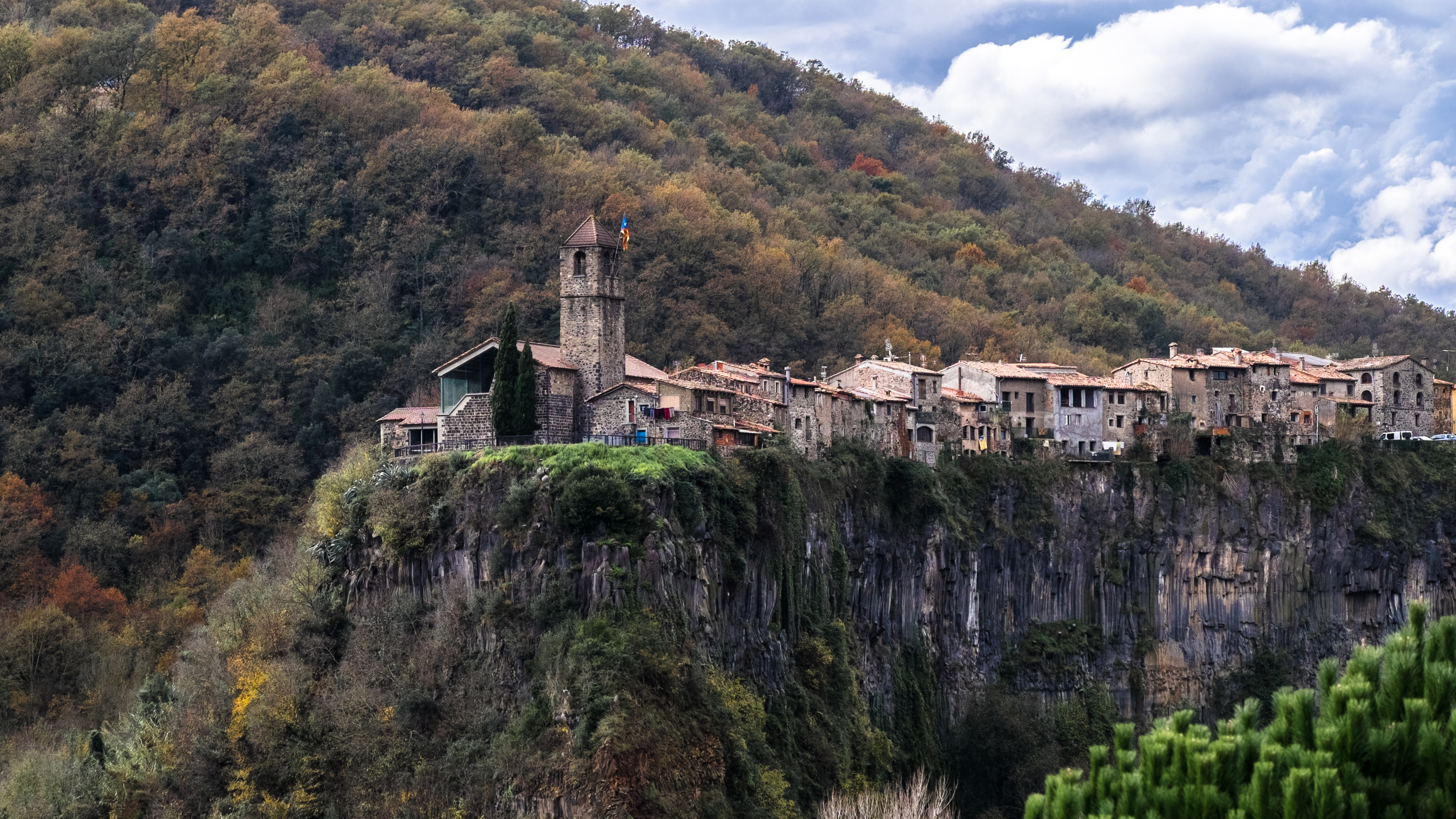
View of Castellfollit de la Roca in 2014

In the weeks that followed the battle, the Spanish troops and local militia increased their pressure on Castellfollit's garrison. On 5 April, the Catalan miquelets, supported by five companies of dragoons and several peasants, defeated a party of French troops from Berga and Castellfollit, killing 60 soldiers and taking 200 prisoners. Noailles, then afflicted with rheumatism, ordered Lieutenant-general Saint-Sylvestre to assemble a supply convoy to relieve Castellfollit, which he put under an escort of 2,000 infantry and 600 cavalry. A corps of miquelets, Spanish dragoons and peasants led by Blai de Trinxeria attacked and defeated the convoy on 15 April. After that, the French garrisons of Castellfollit and Hostalric fell under an effective blockade. On 19 May, Saint-Sylvestre assembled an army of 8,000 infantry and 3,000 cavalry and relieved Hostalric, but Castellfollit remained blockaded. Noailles and his second in command were not on good terms: while Saint-Sylvestre advocated for demolishing and abandoning both Hostalric and Castellfollit, Noailles was not willing to give ground.

In late June, Louis XIV replaced Noailles with Louis Joseph, Duke of Vendôme. Noailles charged Saint-Sylvestre with incompetence and, as was done with other high officers, of looting the country for his own benefit, which had caused the peasantry to rise against the French army. On 8 July Vendôme led his troops to Castellfollit. Having expelled its population and after eating the horses and mules, the French garrison, diminished by desertions, was in an unsustainable position, and Vendôme decided to evacuate and demolish the fortress. After that, the French army moved on to Hostalric and demolished its defenses, returning to Girona on 28 July.

== Bibliography ==
- Courcillon, Philippe de (1830). Mémoires et journal du Marquis De Dangeau: publiés pour la première fois sur les manuscrits originaux, Vol. 3. Paris: Mame et Delaunay-Vallée. OCLC 10400729.
- Espino López, Antonio (1994). El frente catalán en la Guerra de los Nueve Años, 1689-1697. Bellaterra: Universitat Autònoma de Barcelona. ISBN 9788469202272.
- Monsalvatje y Fossas, Francisco (1893). Noticias históricas. El vizcondado de Bas. Olot: Juan Bonet. OCLC 78776781.
- Paluzie i Cantalozella, Esteve (1860). Olot: su comarca, sus extinguidos volcanes, su historia civil, religiosa y local. Barcelona: Establ. Tip. de Jaime Jepús. OCLC 802870905.
- Saint-Hilaire, Armand de Mormès de (1903). Lecestre, Léon (ed.). Mémoires de Saint-Hilaire. Vol. 2. Paris: Renouard, H. Laurens. OCLC 906333654.
- Sévin, Charles (1726). Histoire militaire du regne de Louis le Grand, roy de France, Vol. 3. Paris: D. Mariette. OCLC 832529040.
- Young, William (2004). International Politics and Warfare in the Age of Louis XIV and Peter the Great. Lincoln: iUniverse. ISBN 0-595-32992-6.
