= Sant Aniol =

Sant Aniol (Catalan for Saint Andeolus) may refer to:

- Sant Aniol d'Aguja, Benedictine monastery in Montagut i Oix, Province of Girona, Catalonia, Spain
- Sant Aniol de Finestres, municipality in the comarca of Garrotxa in Girona, Catalonia, Spain
