= Sant Sepulcre de Palera =

Monastery in Beuda, Spain

Coordinates: 42°13′26″N 2°41′57″E

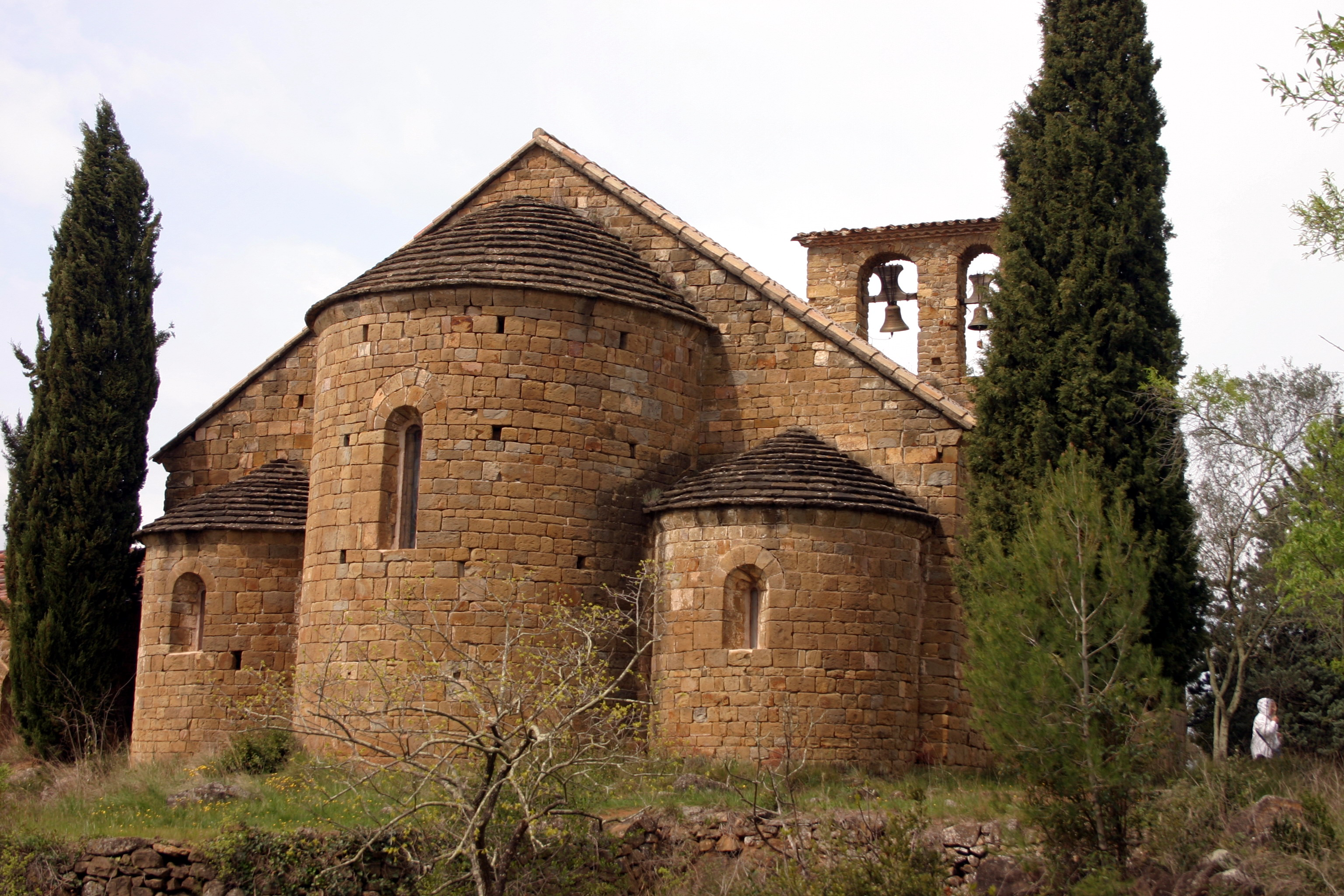
Sant Sepulcre de Palera

Sant Sepulcre de Palera is a Benedictine monastery in Beuda, in the comarca of Garrotxa, Province of Girona, Catalonia, Spain. The priory was consecrated by Bishop Berengar of Berga in 1085, with the assistance of the bishops of Barcelona, Carcassonne, Albi and Elne. In 1107 it became part of the monastery of Santa Maria de la Grasse until the sixteenth century, when it became a pilgrimage centre known as Santo Domingo de Palera. In 1936 the temple was desecrated and several figures and parts of altarpieces disappeared. It became a Bien de Interés Cultural site on 24 September 1964.
