= Sant Jaume =

Sant Jaume, Catalan for Saint James, may refer to:

- Sant Jaume d'Enveja, municipality in the comarca of Montsià
- Sant Jaume de Frontanyà, municipality in the comarca of Berguedà
- Sant Jaume de Llierca, village in the province of Girona
- Sant Jaume dels Domenys, village in the province of Tarragona
