= Monestir de Sant Joan les Fonts =

Monastery in Sant Joan les Fonts, Spain

Coordinates: 42.2175°N 2.515°E

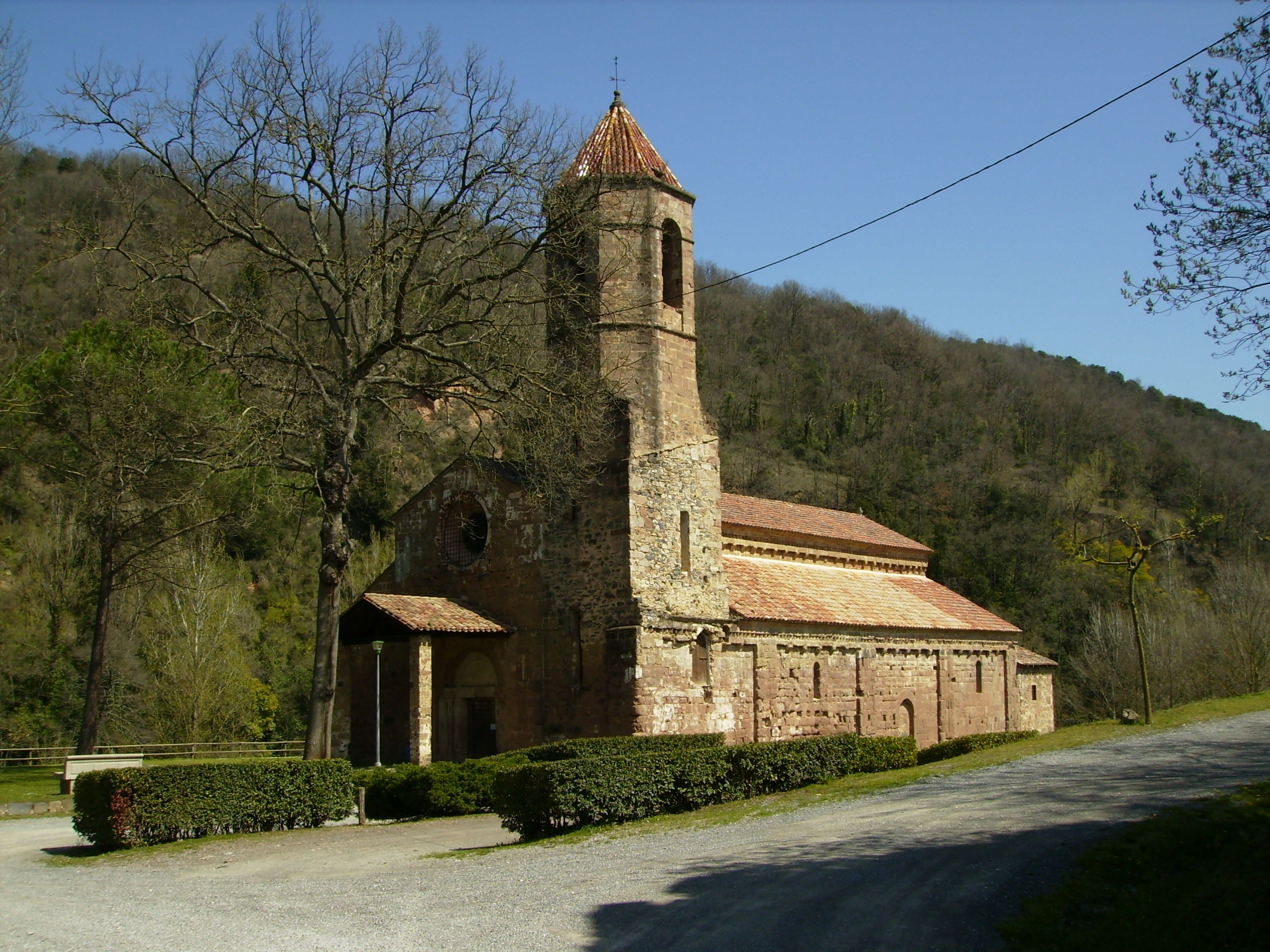
Sant Joan les Fonts

Sant Joan les Fonts is a Benedictine monastery in Sant Joan les Fonts, Garrotxa comarca, Catalonia, Spain. In 1079, the church was owned by the viscounts of Besalu. They granted it to the Abbey of St. Victor of Marseille, which established a Benedictine priory there. It was subordinate to Sant Pere de Besalú until 1592, and to Sant Pere de Camprodón until 1835.

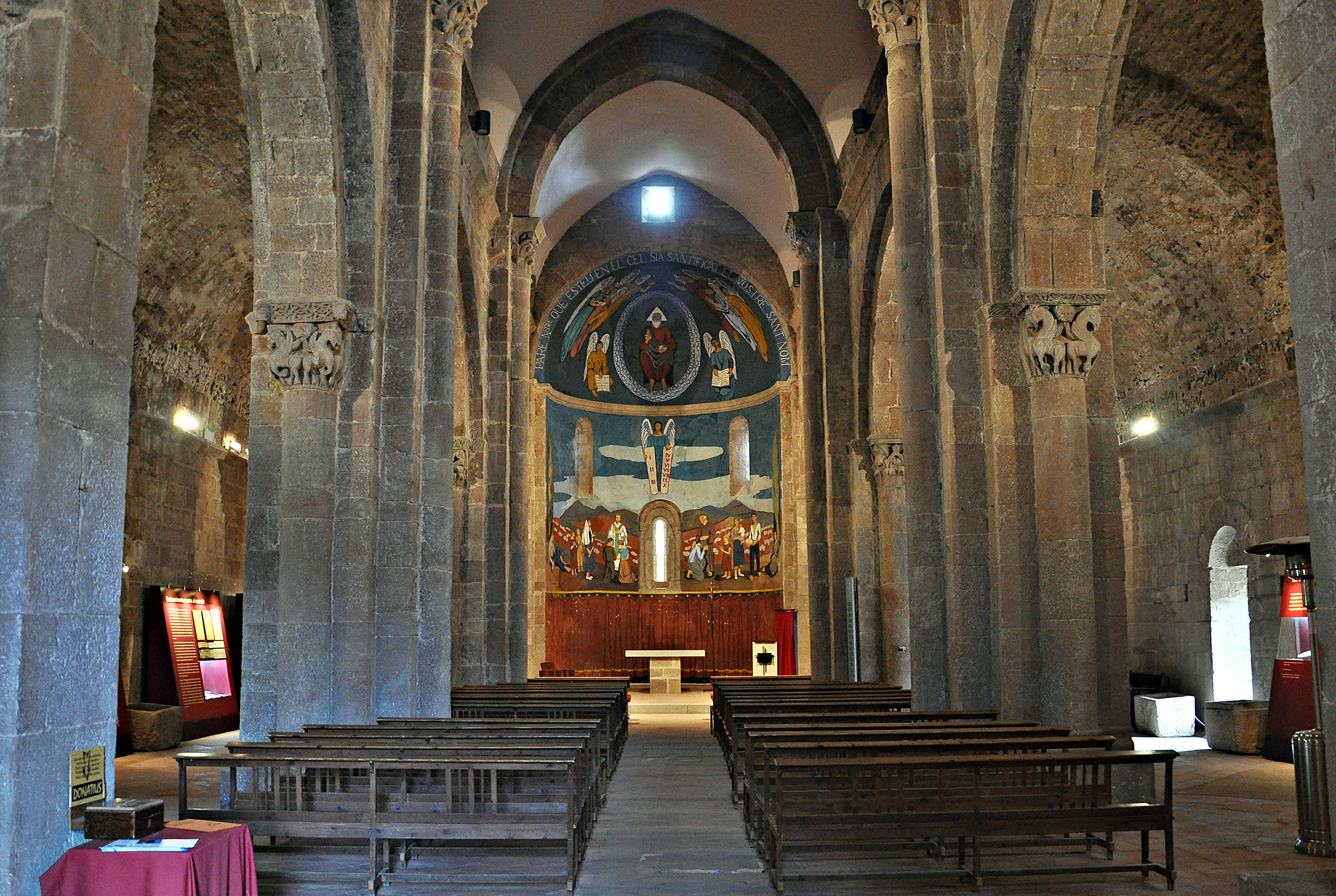
Interior

The monastery was declared a national monument in 1982. Built in Romanesque style, it has three naves, the central one pointed vault and the naves at the side rounded. It was restored in the late 20th century.

== Bibliography ==
- Pladev all, Antoni (1999). Guies Catalunya Romànica, La Garrotxa. Barcelona, Pòrtic. ISBN 978-84-412-0229-0 (in Catalán).
