= Tortellà =

- Municipality
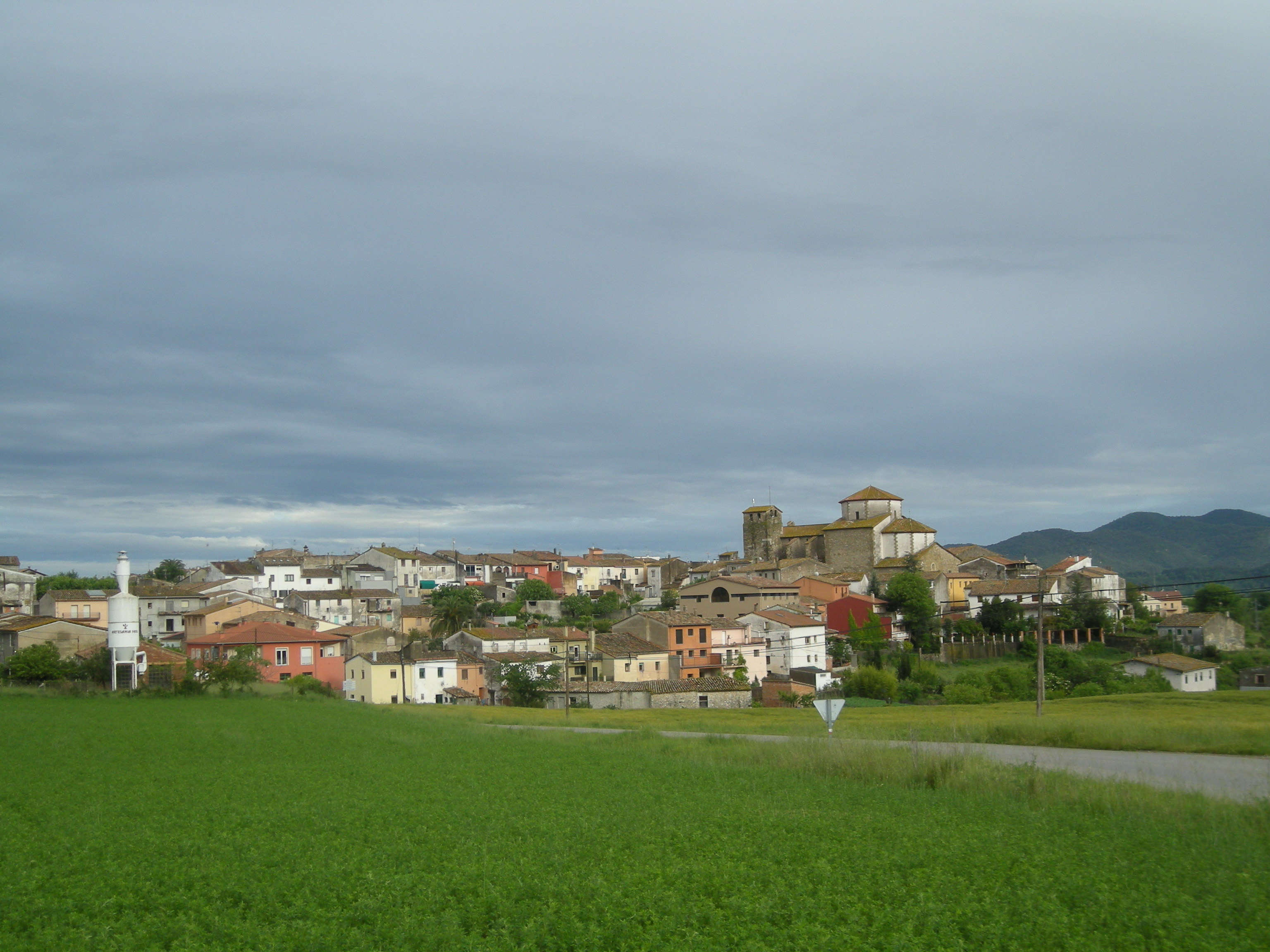
- Tortellà

- Coat of arms

- Location in Catalonia Tortellà (Spain)
- Coordinates: 42°14′N 2°38′E
- Country: Spain
- Community: Catalonia
- Province: Girona
- Comarca: Garrotxa

Government
  - Mayor: Rafel Dominguez Blázquez (2015)

Area
  - Total: 11.1 km^{2} (4.3 sq mi)

Population (2025-01-01)
  - Total: 849
  - Density: 76.5/km^{2} (198/sq mi)
- Website: www.tortella.cat

Tortellà (Catalan pronunciation: [tuɾtəˈʎa]) is a village in the province of Girona and autonomous community of Catalonia, Spain.
