= Sant Joan les Fonts =

- Municipality
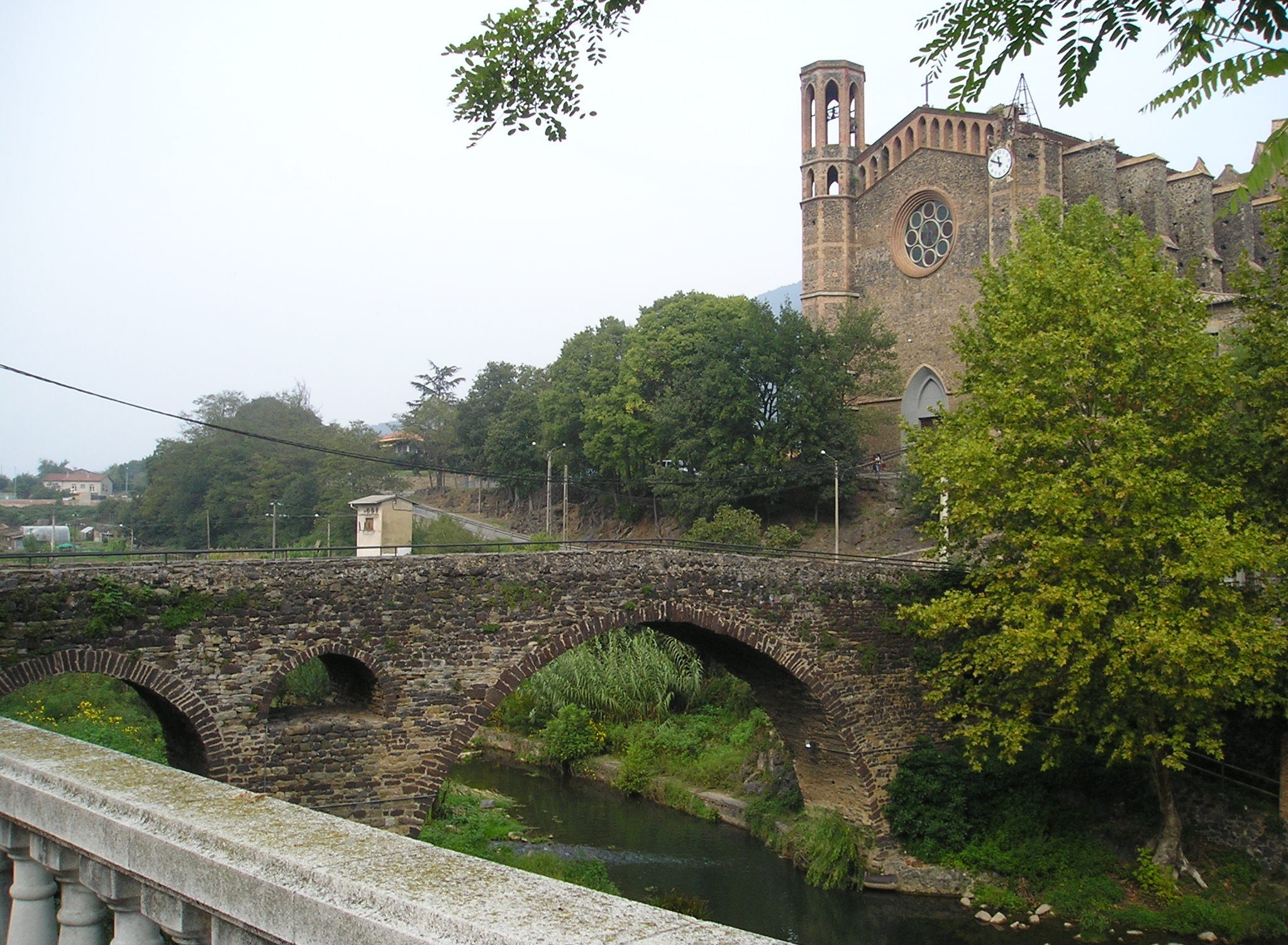

- Coat of arms

- Location in Catalonia Sant Joan les Fonts (Spain)
- Coordinates: 42°12′54″N 2°30′50″E
- Country: Spain
- Autonomous community: Catalonia
- Province: Girona
- Comarca: Garrotxa

Government
  - Mayor: Joan Espona Agustín (2015) (Convergence and Union)

Area
  - Total: 31.9 km^{2} (12.3 sq mi)
- Elevation: 342 m (1,122 ft)

Population (2025-01-01)
  - Total: 3,167
  - Density: 99.3/km^{2} (257/sq mi)
- Demonym: Santjoanenc
- Postal code: 17857
- Website: www.santjoanlesfonts.cat

Sant Joan les Fonts (Catalan pronunciation: [ˈsaɲ ʒuˈan ləs ˈfɔns]) is a municipality of the comarca of Garrotxa, located in Girona, Catalonia, northern Spain. As of 2014, the population is 2,919. Until 1949 it was known as Begudà.

It is part of the Zona Volcànica de la Garrotxa Natural Park.

== The municipality ==
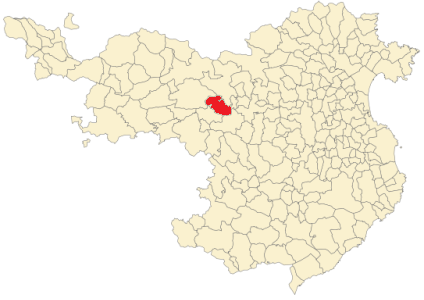
Location of Sant Joan les Fonts in the province of Gerona

It is the second most populous municipality of Garrotxa (after Olot). It is located at the confluence linking Girona to Olot, Figueres and Camprodón. It is crossed by the river Fluvià, which has been the engine behind the population's industrial development. Industry is the most developed sector in the municipality, followed by agriculture.

== History ==
The earliest core of the town was formed in the ninth century. Earthquakes in the years 1427 and 1428 most of the collapsed buildings. A recovery began in the area, with small population centers, that was hampered by civil war in the fifteenth century.

During the 17th century, it lived through an age of crisis, aggravated by the War of the Spanish Succession.

There was no significant population growth until the eighteenth century, with the incorporation of immigrants from Olot and the vicinity. Later, war resulted in another decline of the population, a decline that continued throughout the 19th century. The 1854 cholera epidemic wreaked havoc.

During the 20th century, there was a social and economic revival, despite the internecine 1936 civil war.

== Population ==
- Begudà, 248 inhabitants
- La Canya, 557 inhabitants
- El Pla de Baix, 39 inhabitants
- El Pla de Dalt, 54 inhabitants
- Sant Cosme, 100 inhabitants
- Sant Joan les Fonts, 1,761 inhabitants

== Main sights ==
Monestir de Sant Joan les Fonts is a Romanesque building, declared a national monument.

The medieval bridge, built with volcanic stone, crosses the river Fluvià and links the core of the town with the existing church and the Castanyer neighborhood.

A fortress is located at the Serra de Vivers. From this point one can observe the entire landscape of Garrotxa, from Besalú through the valley of Olot and the valley de Bianya. The Canadell Tower is a four-story square building with "espitlleres" on all four sides and a terrace roof. It was once surrounded by ramparts.

The Juvinyà estate is known as the oldest Romanesque civil building in Catalonia. It is located along the Fluvià river. It is a fortified manor house with two parts, the defensive tower and main building. It was declared a provincial monument in 1972.

An area of archeological interest also known for the lava flow that formed part of the old lock known as "la Reformada".

== Holidays ==
Various holidays are celebrated:

- The festival of San Isidro, in May
- The festival of Roser, Easter Monday
- The main festival, June 24
- The "pessebre vivent" (nativity scenes), Christmas
- Begudà celebrates the festival of Santa Eulàlia, and the main festival in the first weekend of August.

== Twin towns ==
- Ydes, France
