= Beuda =

- Municipality
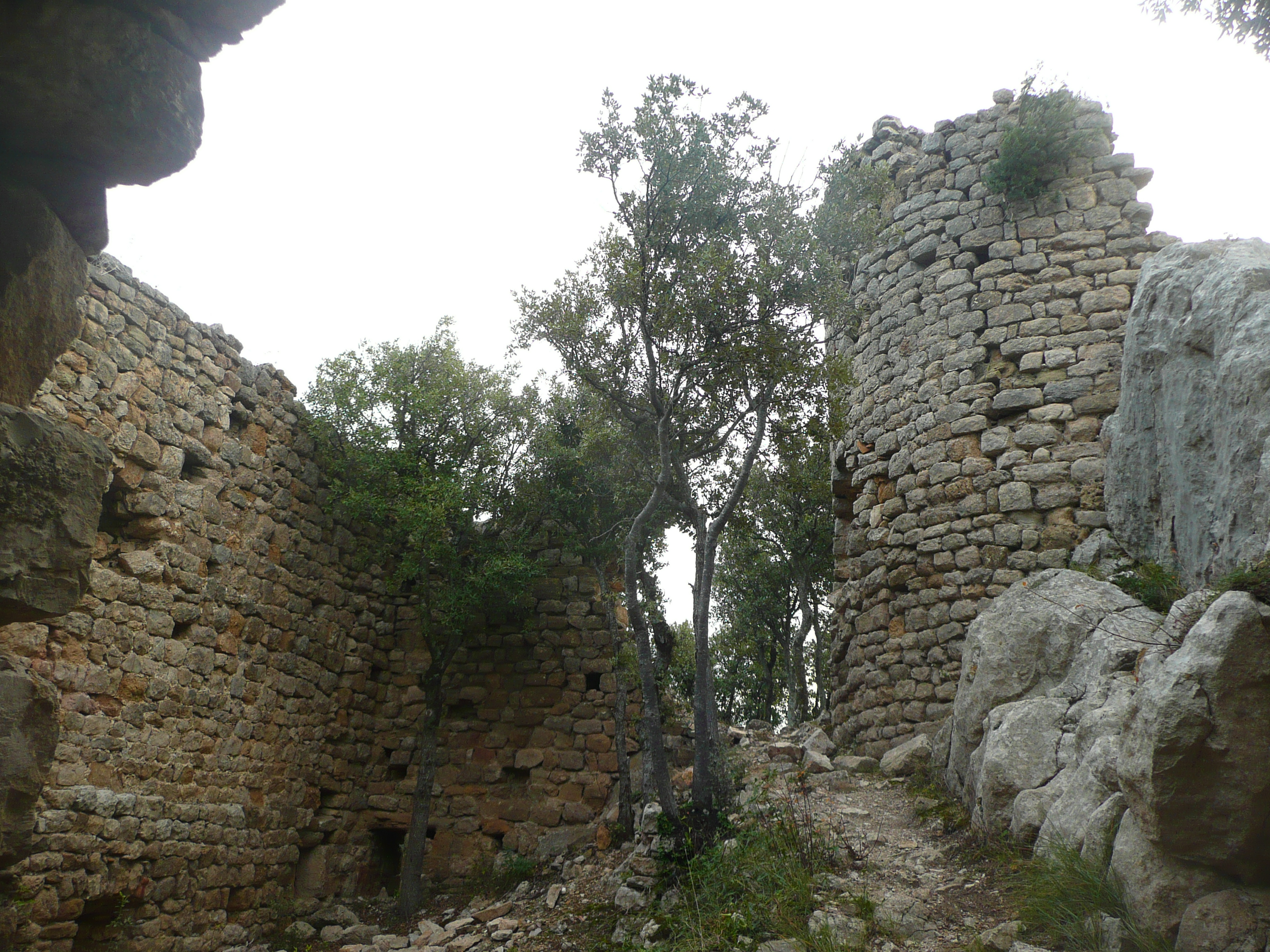
- El Castellot (Beuda)

- Flag Coat of arms

- Location in Catalonia Beuda (Spain)
- Coordinates: 42°14′N 2°43′E
- Country: Spain
- Community: Catalonia
- Province: Girona
- Comarca: Garrotxa

Government
  - Mayor: Anna Vayreda Torrent (2015)

Area
  - Total: 35.9 km^{2} (13.9 sq mi)

Population (2025-01-01)
  - Total: 203
  - Density: 5.65/km^{2} (14.6/sq mi)
- Website: www.beuda.cat

Beuda (Catalan pronunciation: [ˈbɛwðə]) is a municipality located in the comarca of Garrotxa, in the province of Girona, Catalonia, Spain. It is located on the slopes near the Mont massif, to the north of Besalú.

== Places of interest ==
- Església de Sant Feliu - Romanesque; 11th century
- Monestir de Sant Sepulcre de Palera - Romanesque; 11th century
- Església Santa Maria de Palera
- Església de Santa Llúcia de Beuda
