= Sales de Llierca =

- Municipality
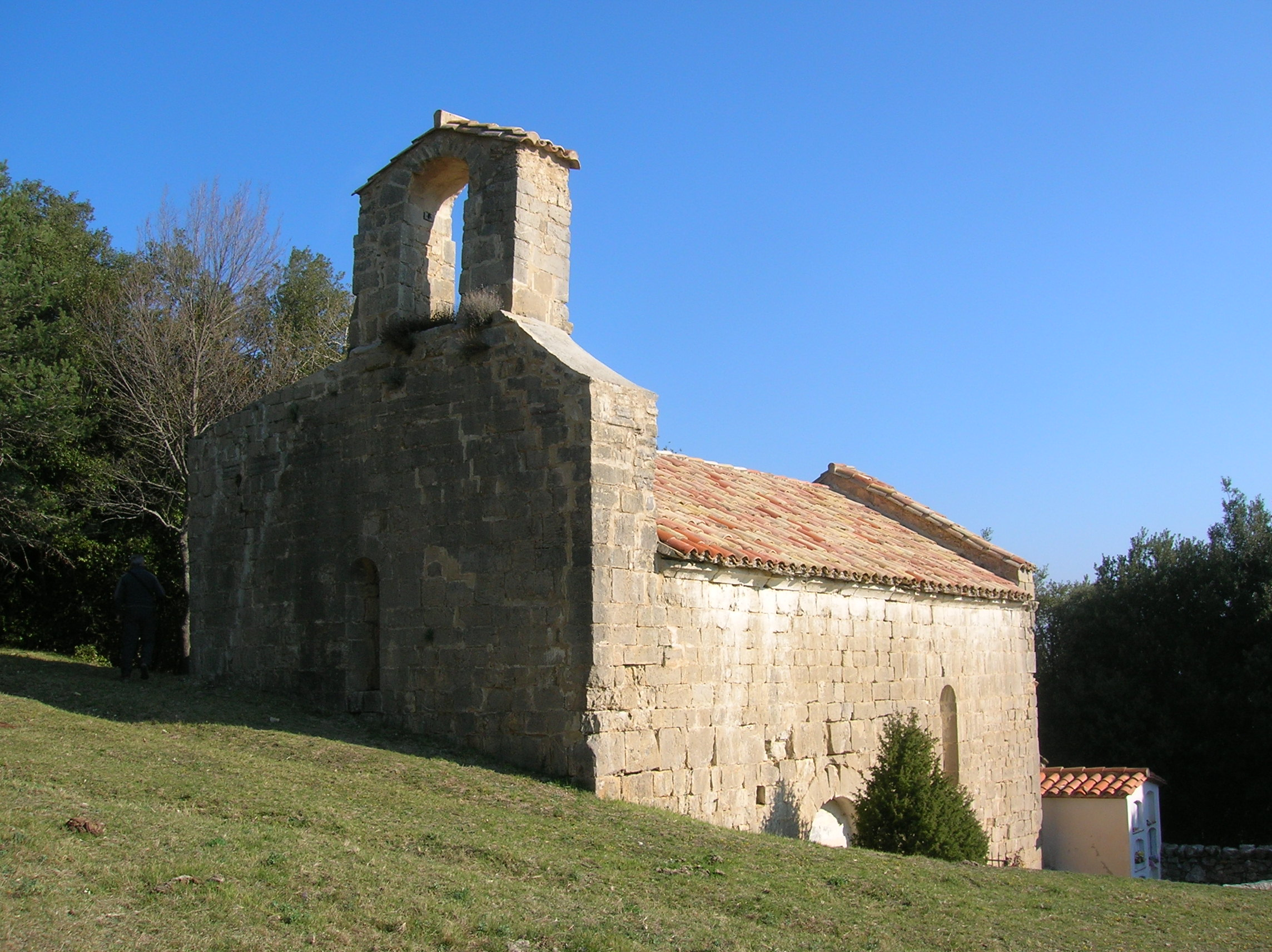
- Church

- Coat of arms

- Location in Catalonia Sales de Llierca (Spain)
- Coordinates: 42°14′16″N 2°39′3″E
- Country: Spain
- Community: Catalonia
- Province: Girona
- Comarca: Garrotxa

Government
  - Mayor: Miquel Palomeras Anglada (2015)

Area
  - Total: 35.8 km^{2} (13.8 sq mi)

Population (2025-01-01)
  - Total: 164
  - Density: 4.58/km^{2} (11.9/sq mi)
- Website: www.salesdellierca.cat

Sales de Llierca (Catalan pronunciation: [ˈsaləz ðə ʎiˈeɾkə]) is a village and municipality in the province of Girona and autonomous community of Catalonia, Spain. The municipality covers an area of 35.84 square kilometres (13.84 sq mi) and the population in 2014 was 133.
