= Argelaguer =

- Municipality
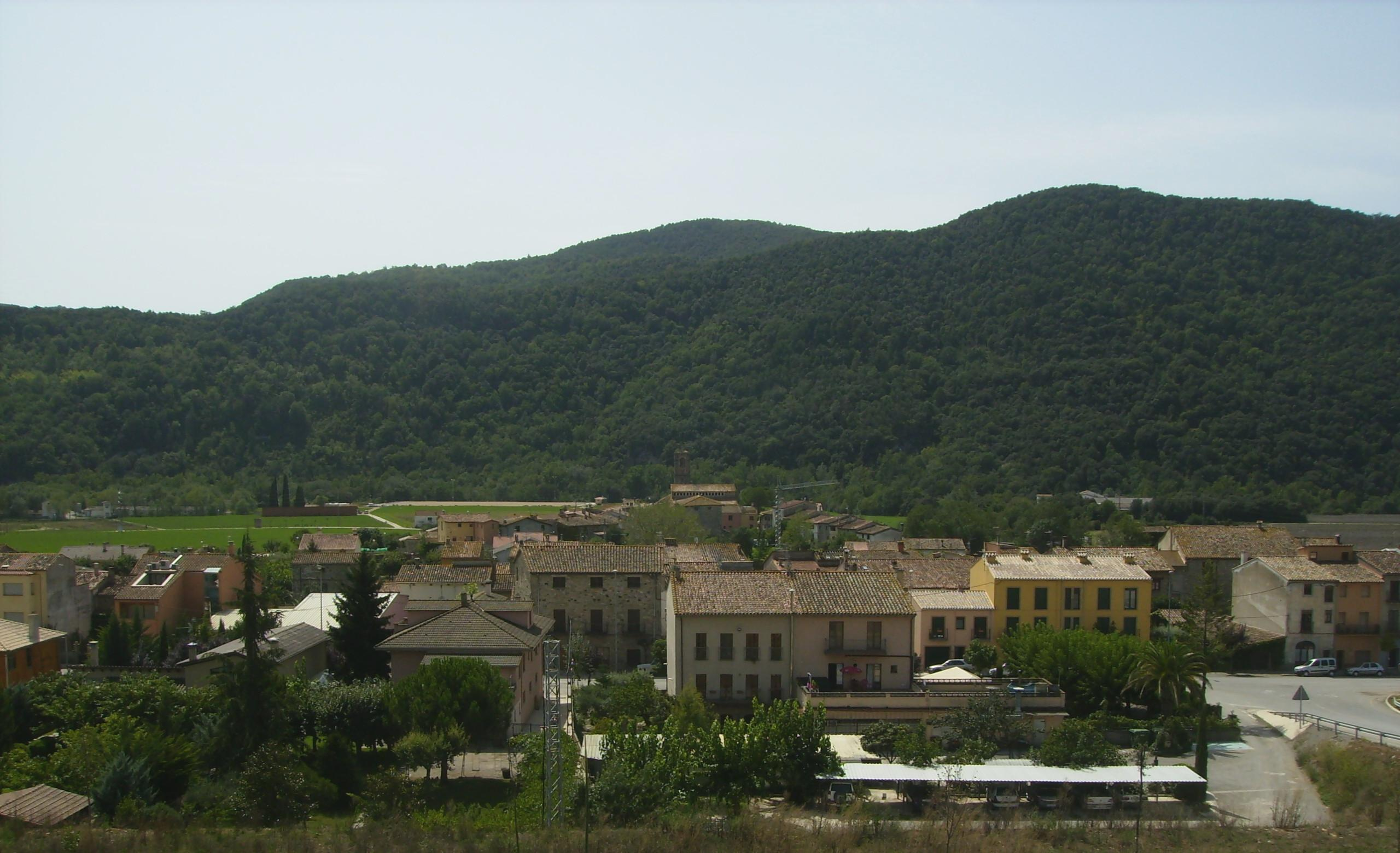
- Argelaguer

- Flag Coat of arms

- Location in Catalonia Argelaguer (Spain)
- Coordinates: 42°13′N 2°39′E
- Country: Spain
- Community: Catalonia
- Province: Girona
- Comarca: Garrotxa

Government
  - Mayor: Guillem Ballaz i Bogunyà (2023)

Area
  - Total: 12.5 km^{2} (4.8 sq mi)

Population (2025-01-01)
  - Total: 468
  - Density: 37.4/km^{2} (97.0/sq mi)
- Website: www.argelaguer.cat

Argelaguer (Catalan pronunciation: [əɾʒələˈɣe]) is a village in the province of Girona and autonomous community of Catalonia, Spain. The municipality covers an area of 12.56 square kilometres (4.85 sq mi) and the population in 2014 was 425.
