= Riudaura =

- Municipality
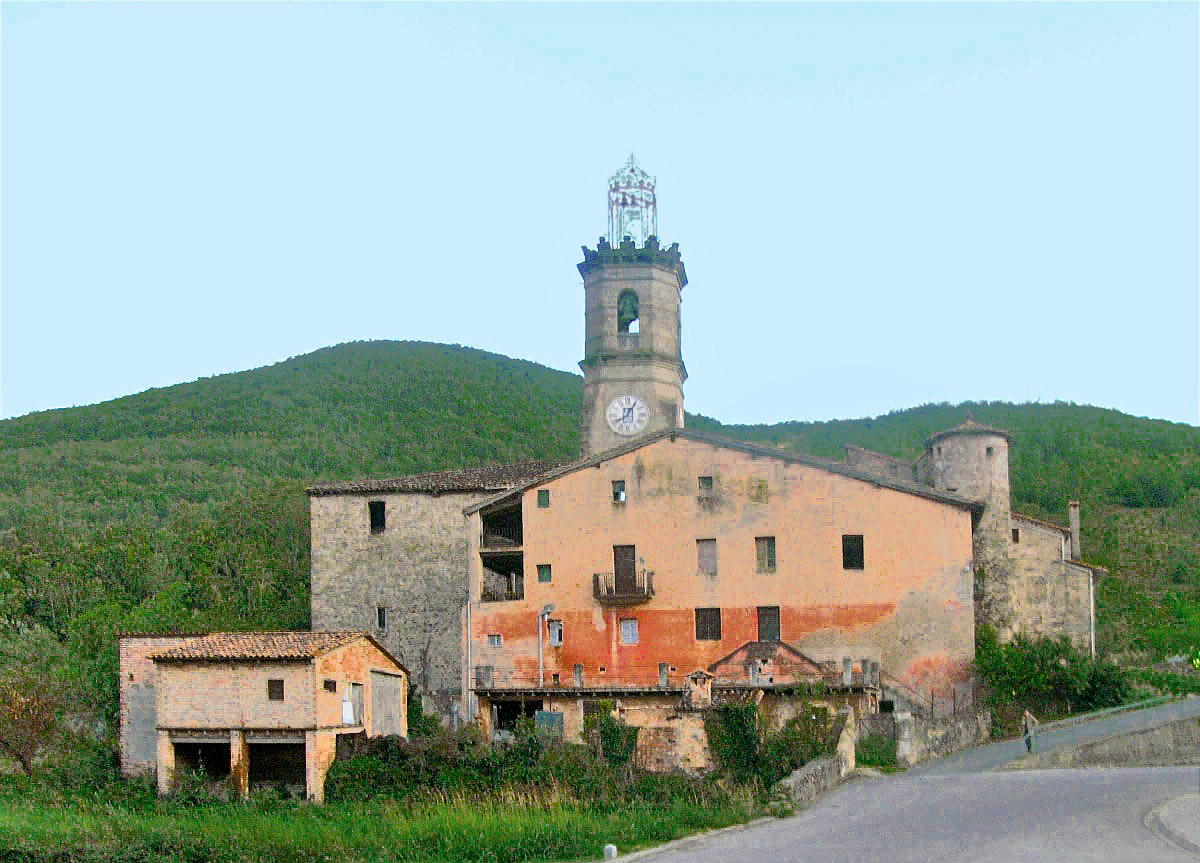

- Coat of arms

- Location in Catalonia
- Coordinates: 42°11′25″N 2°24′31″E
- Country: Spain
- Community: Catalonia
- Comarca: Garrotxa

Government
  - Mayor: David Jané López (2015)

Area
  - Total: 23.6 km^{2} (9.1 sq mi)
- Elevation: 572 m (1,877 ft)

Population (2025-01-01)
  - Total: 526
  - Density: 22.3/km^{2} (57.7/sq mi)
- Postal code: 17149
- Website: www.riudaura.cat

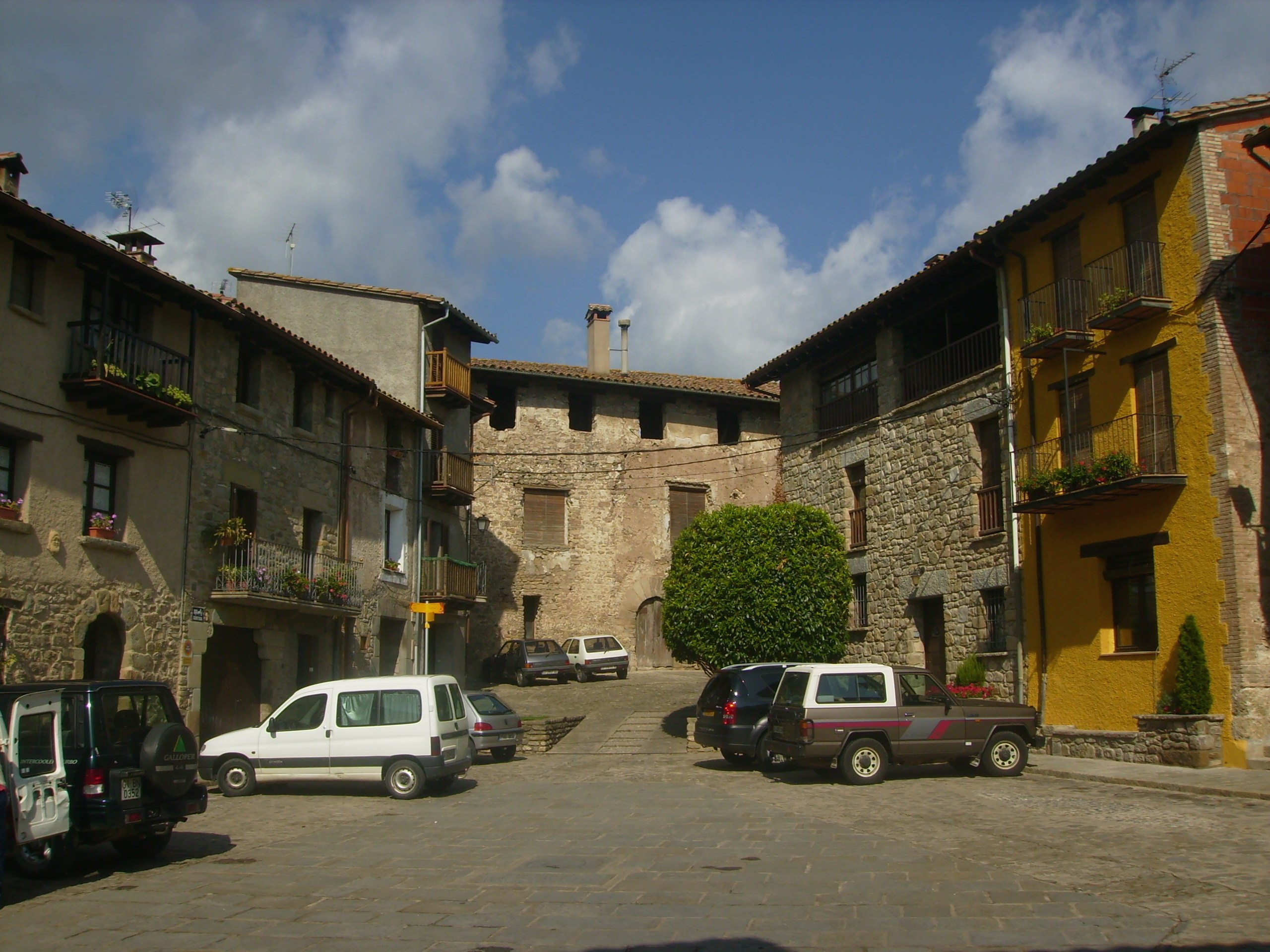
Plaça del Gambeto

Riudaura (Catalan pronunciation: [riˈðawɾə]) is a municipality in the comarca of Garrotxa in Girona, Catalonia, Spain.

The local river, riera de Riudaura, caused a flood further downstream in Olot town in 1940.

== Villages ==
- Bac d'en Déu, 26
- Clot de la Plana, 23
- El Solei, 84
- La Fajula, 15
- Riudaura, 258
