= Castellfollit de la Roca =

- Municipality
- Flag Coat of arms

- Location in Catalonia Castellfollit de la Roca (Spain)
- Coordinates: 42°13′17″N 2°33′3″E
- Country: Spain
- Community: Catalonia
- Province: Girona
- Comarca: Garrotxa

Government
  - Mayor: Miquel Reverter i Tres (2015) (ERC)

Area
  - Total: 0.7 km^{2} (0.27 sq mi)
- Elevation: 296 m (971 ft)

Population (2025-01-01)
  - Total: 966
  - Density: 1,400/km^{2} (3,600/sq mi)
- Demonym: Castellfollitenc
- Postal code: 17856
- Website: www.castellfollitdelaroca.cat

Castellfollit de la Roca (Catalan pronunciation: [kəsˌteʎfuˈʎid də lə ˈrɔkə]) is a municipality in the comarca of Garrotxa, in the Province of Girona, Catalonia, Spain. The urban area is bordered by the confluence of the Fluvià and Toronell rivers, between which the town's basalt cliff rises.

== The basalt cliff ==
Castellfollit de la Roca is part of La Garrotxa Volcanic Zone Natural Park. The town is built on a basalt crag over 50 metres (160 feet) high and almost a kilometre long. It was formed by the overlaying of two lava flows.

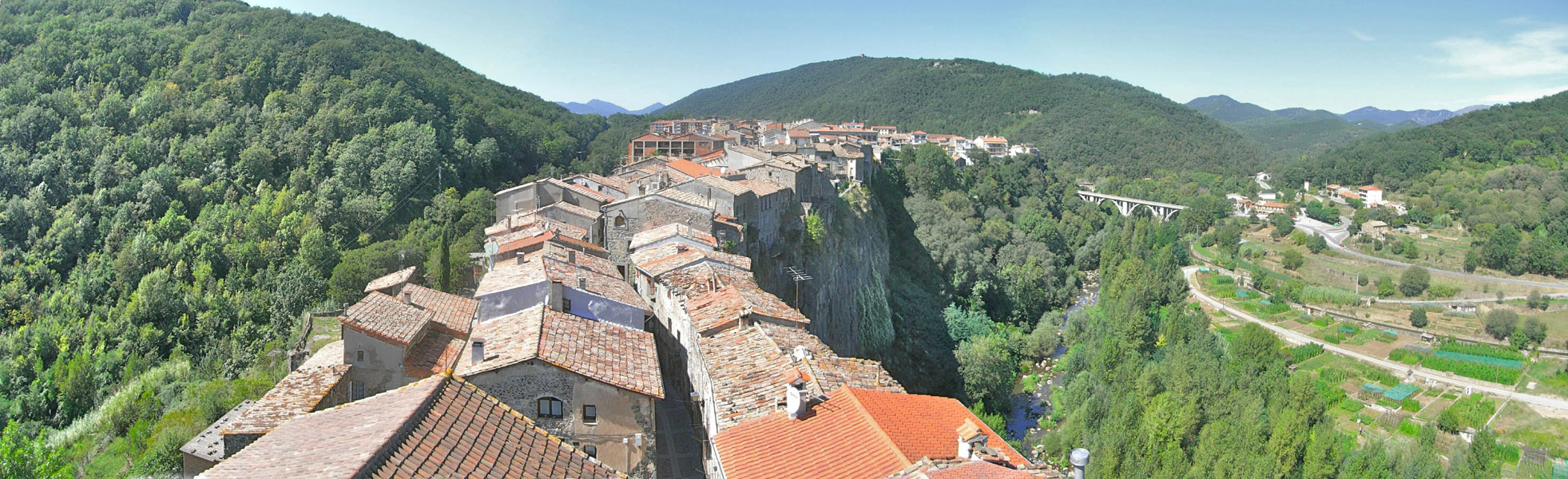
Castellfollit de la Roca viewed from its old church bell tower
