= Mieres, Girona =

Mieres
- Municipality
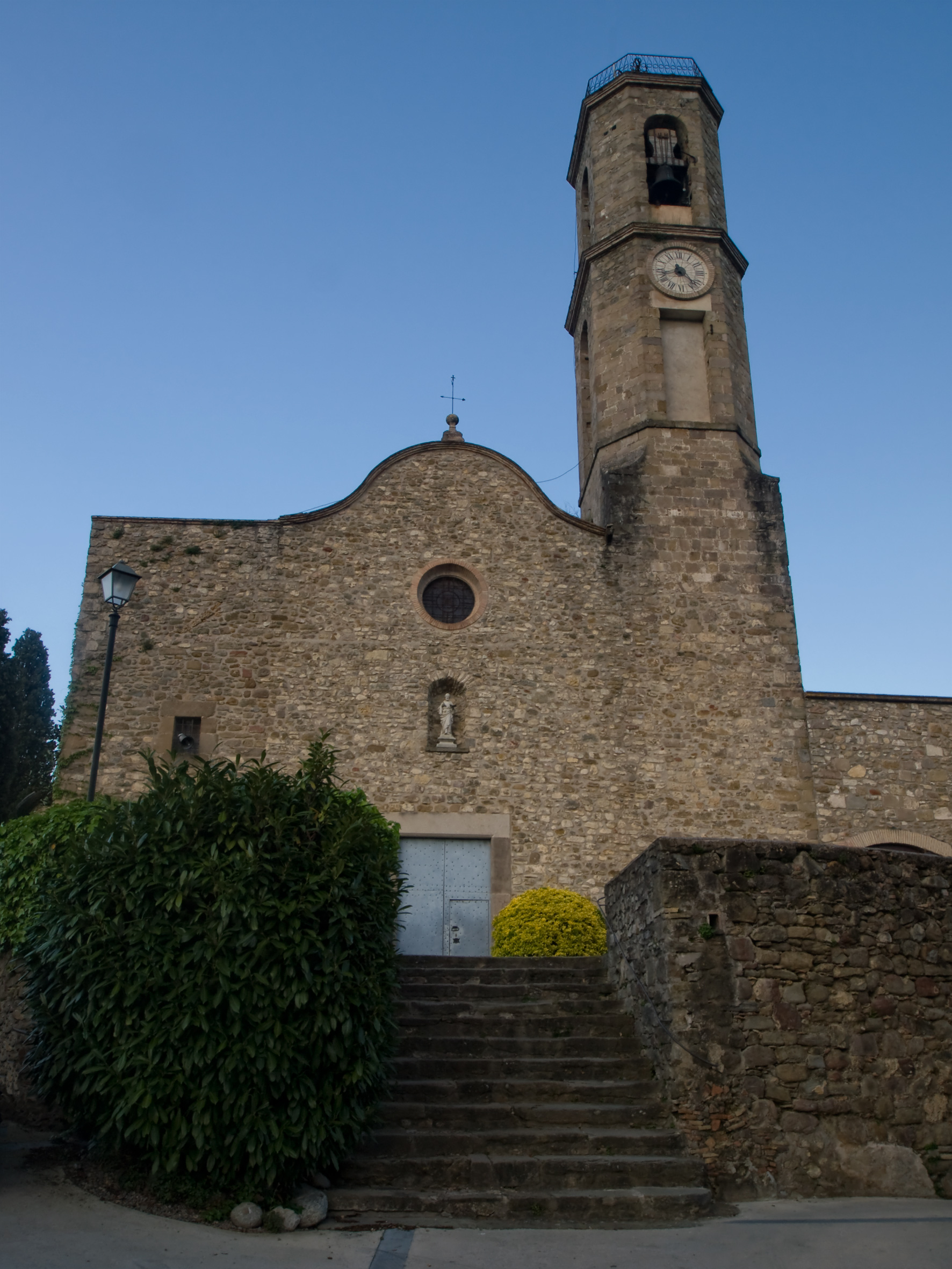
- Mieres church

- Flag Coat of arms

- Location in Catalonia Mieres (Spain)
- Coordinates: 42.1244°N 2.6401°E
- Country: Spain
- Community: Catalonia
- Province: Girona
- Comarca: Garrotxa

Government
  - Mayor: Enric Domènech Mallarach (2015)

Area
  - Total: 26.3 km^{2} (10.2 sq mi)

Population (2025-01-01)
  - Total: 369
  - Density: 14.0/km^{2} (36.3/sq mi)
- Website: www.mieres.cat

Mieres (Catalan pronunciation: [miˈeɾəs]) is a village and municipality in the comarca of Garrotxa, in the province of Girona, in Catalonia, Spain.
