= Les Preses =

- Municipality
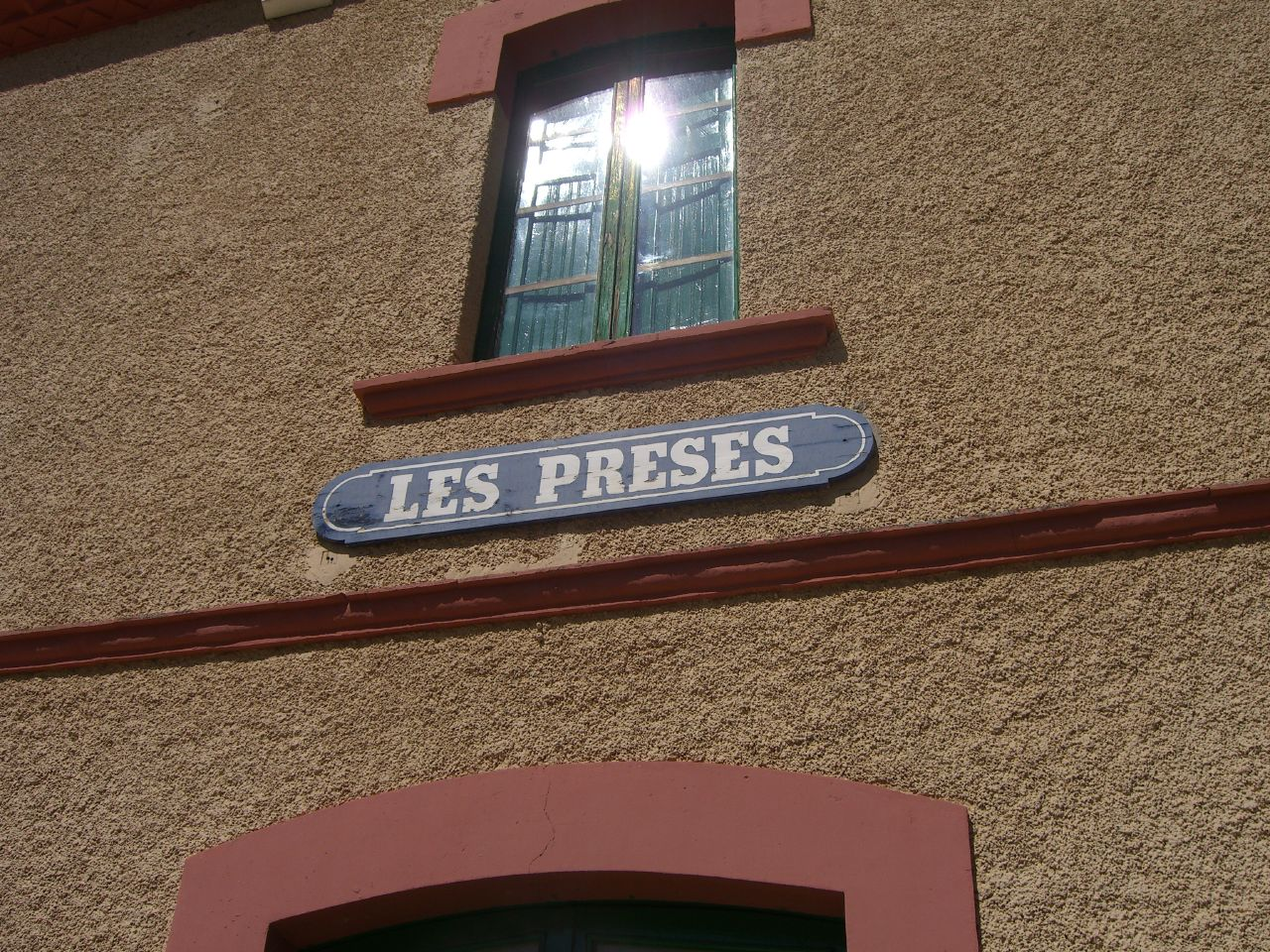
- Les Preses train station

- Coat of arms

- Location in Catalonia Les Preses (Spain)
- Coordinates: 42.145°N 2.46°E
- Country: Spain
- Community: Catalonia
- Province: Girona
- Comarca: Garrotxa

Government
  - Mayor: Pere Vila Frigola (2015)

Area
  - Total: 9.4 km^{2} (3.6 sq mi)

Population (2025-01-01)
  - Total: 1,948
  - Density: 210/km^{2} (540/sq mi)
- Website: lespreses.cat

Les Preses (Catalan pronunciation: [ləs ˈpɾɛzəs]) is a village and municipality in the province of Girona and autonomous community of Catalonia, Spain. The municipality covers an area of 9.42 square kilometres (3.64 sq mi) and the population in 2014 was 1,772.
