= Sant Ferriol =

- Municipality
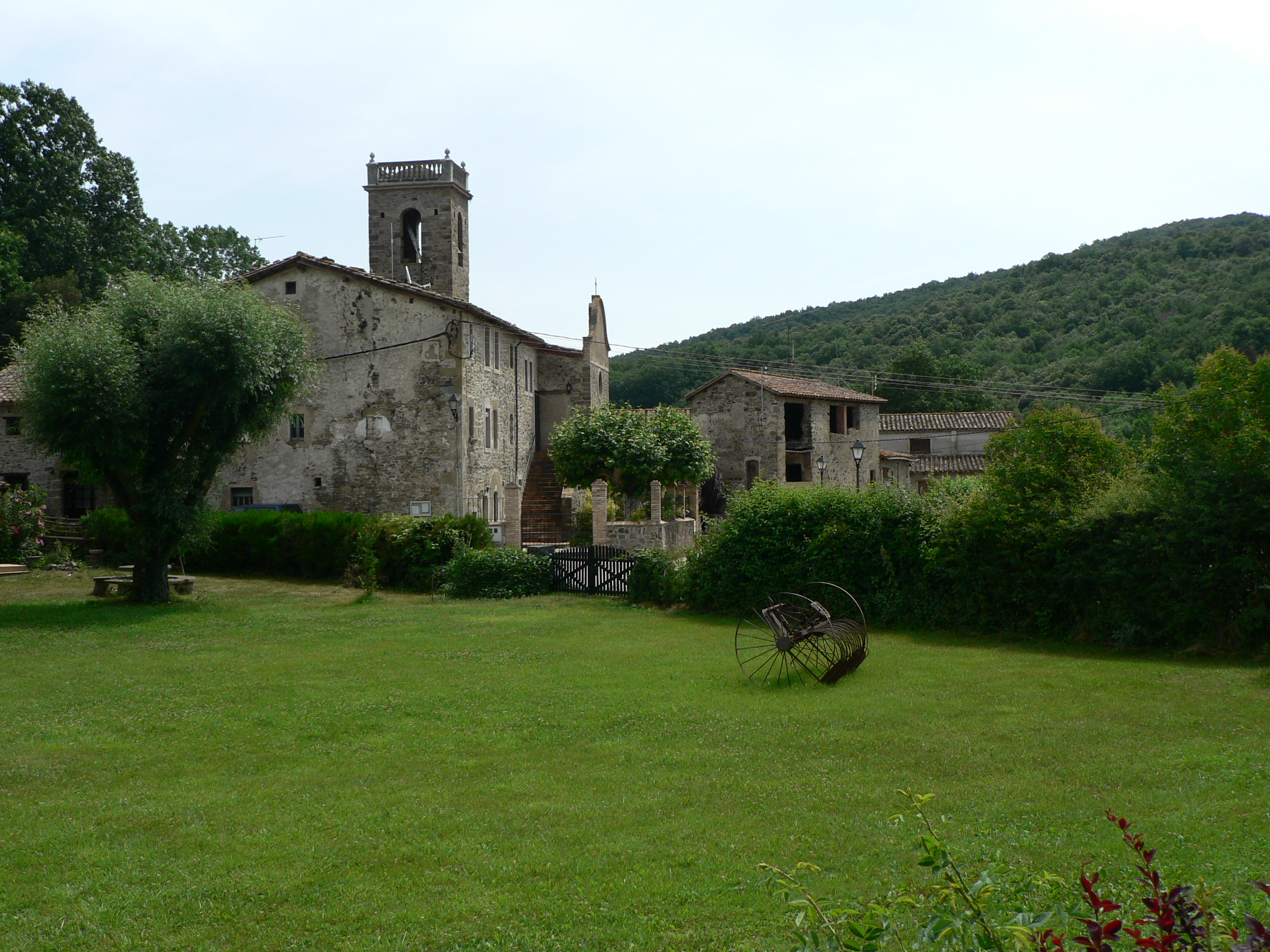
- El Torn, with St. Andrew's church tower

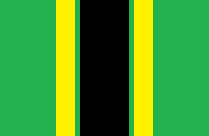
- Flag Coat of arms

- Location in Catalonia Sant Ferriol (Spain)
- Coordinates: 42°11′N 2°40′E
- Country: Spain
- Community: Catalonia
- Province: Girona
- Comarca: Garrotxa

Government
  - Mayor: Albert Fàbrega Sánchez (2015)

Area
  - Total: 42.2 km^{2} (16.3 sq mi)

Population (2025-01-01)
  - Total: 245
  - Density: 5.81/km^{2} (15.0/sq mi)
- Website: www.santferriol.cat

Sant Ferriol (Catalan pronunciation: [ˈsaɱ fəriˈɔl]) is a village in the province of Girona and autonomous community of Catalonia, Spain. The municipality covers an area of 42.26 square kilometres (16.32 sq mi) and the population in 2014 was 240.
