= Maià de Montcal =

- Municipality
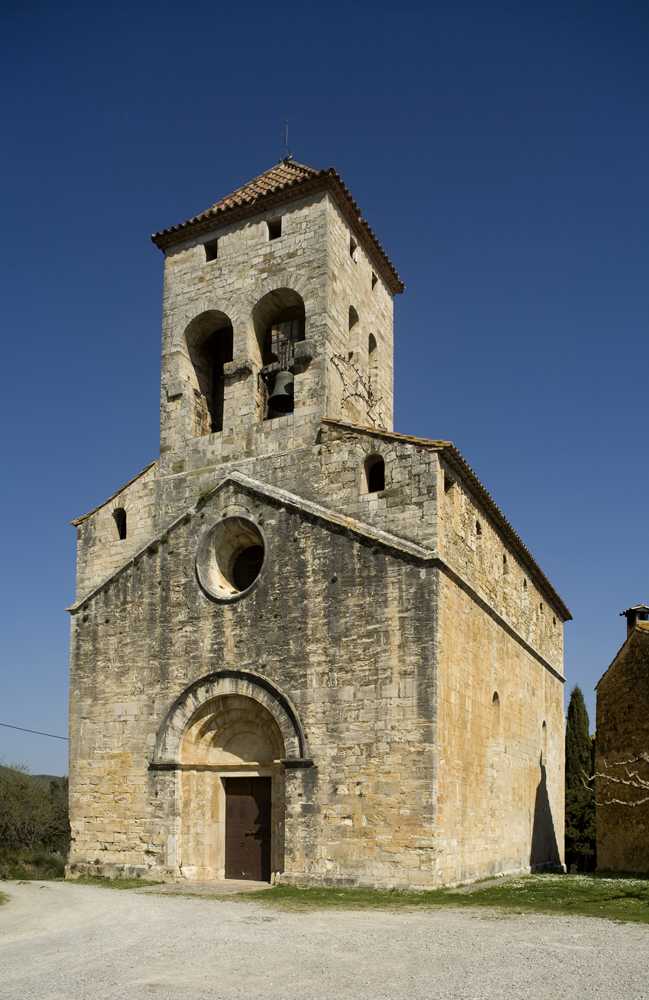
- St. Vincent's parish church

- Location in Catalonia Maià de Montcal (Spain)
- Coordinates: 42.222°N 2.743°E
- Country: Spain
- Community: Catalonia
- Province: Girona
- Comarca: Garrotxa

Government
  - Mayor: Joan Gainza Agustí (2015)

Area
  - Total: 17.3 km^{2} (6.7 sq mi)

Population (2025-01-01)
  - Total: 498
  - Density: 28.8/km^{2} (74.6/sq mi)
- Website: www.maia.cat

Maià de Montcal (Catalan pronunciation: [məˈja ðə muŋˈkal]) is a village in the province of Girona and autonomous community of Catalonia, Spain. The municipality covers an area of 17.28 square kilometres (6.67 sq mi) and the population in 2014 was 443.
