= Aniol Rafel =

Catalan editor

Aniol Rafel (born 1977, Barcelona) is a Catalan editor and publisher. He established Edicions del periscopi in 2012, and since then, it has become consolidated as a reference in the Catalan literary market, obtaining six Bookseller awards (2014, 2015, 2018, 2020 and two in 2022). In the year 2016 he obtained the Memorial Fernando Lara award to the best young entrepreneur in the publishing sector.
