= Anioł Dowgird =

Lithuanian philosopher (1776–1835)

Anioł Dowgird (Lithuanian: Angelas Daugirdas; 1776–1835) was a philosopher of Polish Enlightenment and Lithuanian Enlightenment.

Born into a noble family in the Mahiliou province, Dowgird studied in Jesuit and Piarist schools in Mscislau, Mahiliou and Dubrouna, then joined the Piarist Order and took holy orders. Subsequently, he taught at Piarist schools and for a time was a professor of logic and ethics at Vilnius University.

Dowgird derived his views from John Locke's empiricism, the Scottish School of Common Sense, and Immanuel Kant's Critique of Pure Reason. But, unlike Kant, he ascribed to time and space a real existence independent of man.

== Works ==
- O logice, metafizyce i filozofji moralnej (On Logic, Metaphysics and Moral Philosophy)
- Wykład przyrodzonych myślenia prawideł, czyli logika teoretyczna i praktyczna (A Treatise on the Natural Laws of Thought, or Theoretical and Practical Logic)
- Rezczywistość poznań ludzkich (The Reality of Human Experience)

He also wrote several sermons and left a manuscript treatise on Kant's philosophy.

== See also ==
- History of philosophy in Poland
