= Sant Jaume de Llierca =

- Municipality
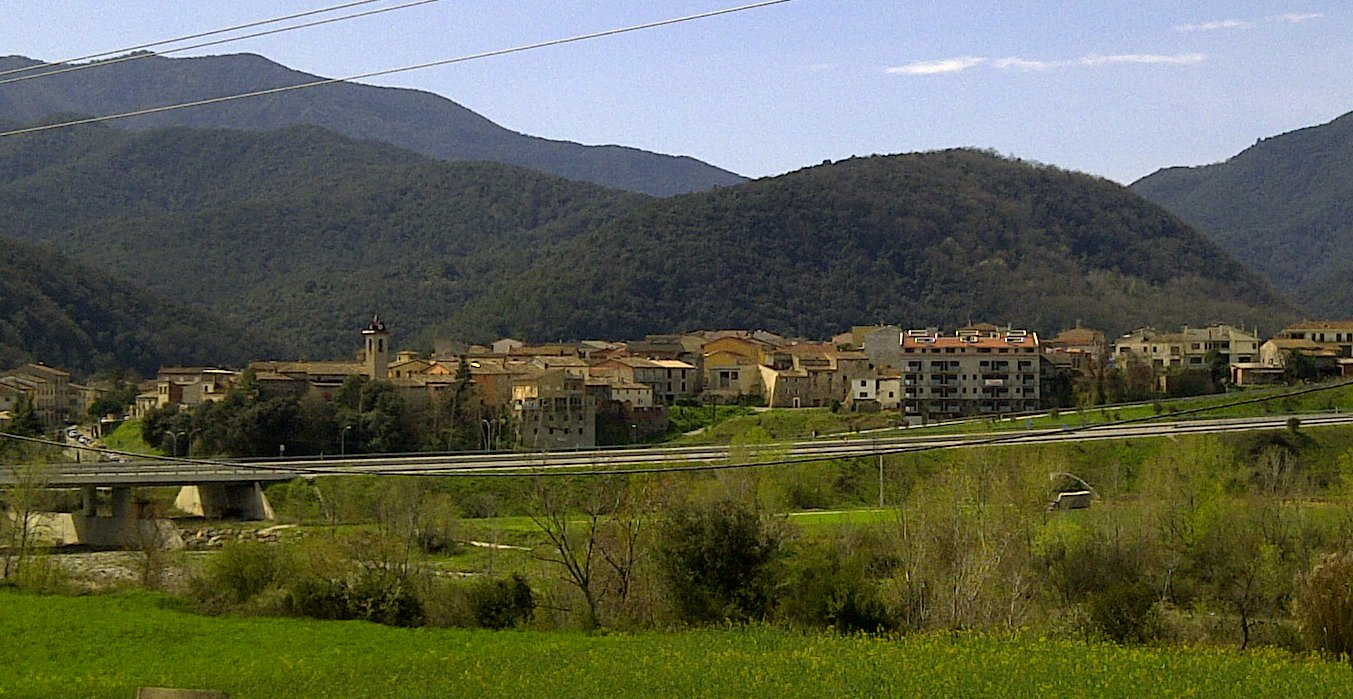
- Sant Jaume de Llierca

- Flag Coat of arms

- Location in Catalonia Sant Jaume de Llierca (Spain)
- Coordinates: 42°12′52″N 2°36′30″E
- Country: Spain
- Community: Catalonia
- Province: Girona
- Comarca: Garrotxa

Government
  - Mayor: Jordi Cargol Cros (2015)

Area
  - Total: 6.8 km^{2} (2.6 sq mi)

Population (2025-01-01)
  - Total: 863
  - Density: 130/km^{2} (330/sq mi)
- Website: www.santjaumedellierca.cat

Sant Jaume de Llierca (Catalan pronunciation: [ˈsaɲ ˈʒawmə ðə ʎiˈeɾkə]) is a village in the province of Girona and autonomous community of Catalonia, Spain. The municipality covers an area of 6.73 square kilometres (2.60 sq mi) and the population in 2014 was 812.
