= La Vall d'en Bas =

- Municipality
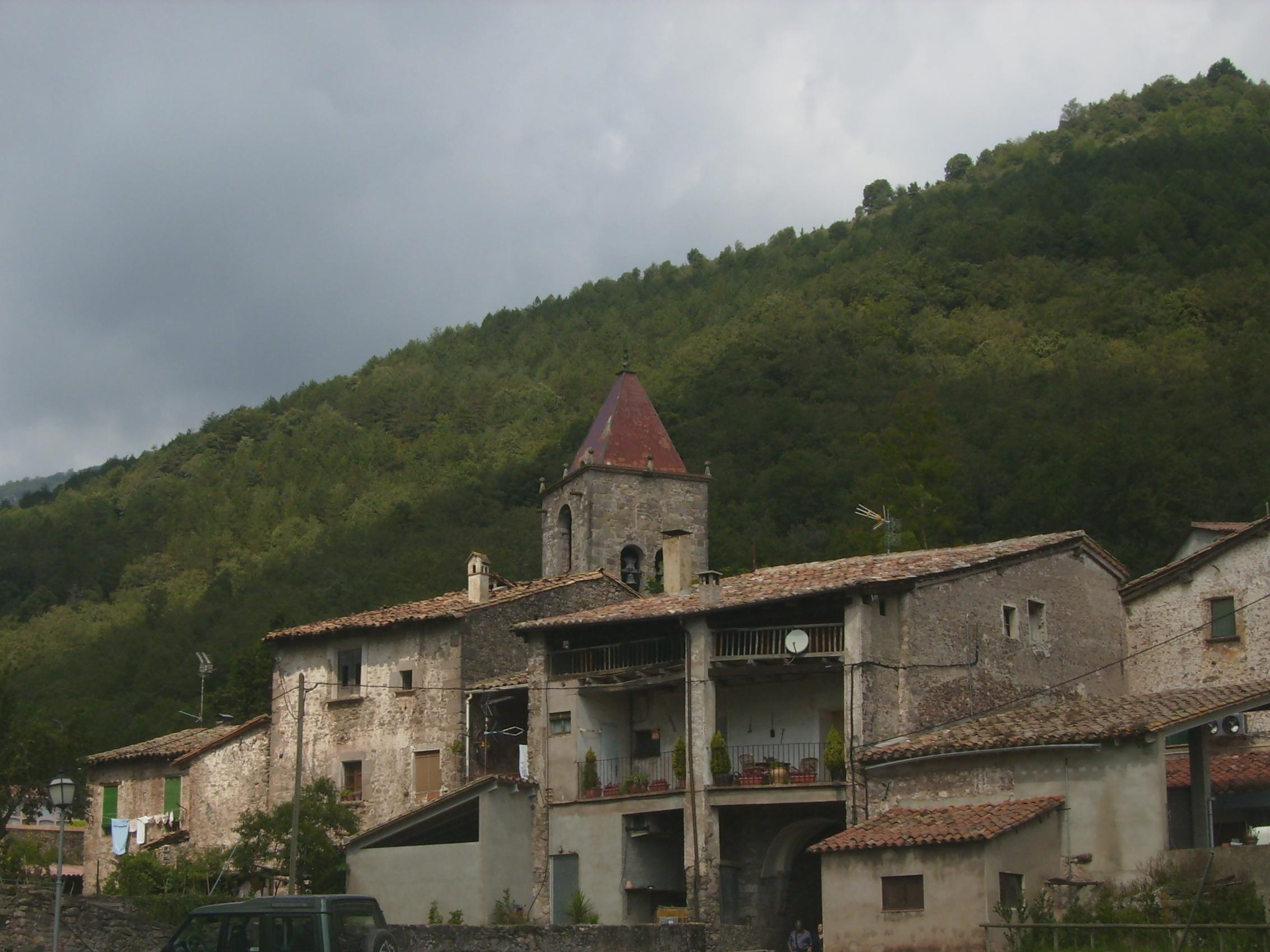
- Village of Sant Privat d'en Bas

- Coat of arms

- Location in Catalonia La Vall d'en Bas (Spain)
- Coordinates: 42°7′5″N 2°27′18″E
- Country: Spain
- Community: Catalonia
- Province: Girona
- Comarca: Garrotxa

Government
  - Mayor: Lluís Amat Batalla (2015)

Area
  - Total: 90.7 km^{2} (35.0 sq mi)

Population (2025-01-01)
  - Total: 3,269
  - Density: 36.0/km^{2} (93.3/sq mi)
- Website: www.vallbas.cat

La Vall d'en Bas (Catalan pronunciation: [lə ˈβaʎ dəm ˈbas]) is a municipality in the province of Girona and autonomous community of Catalonia, Spain.
