= Sant Pau de Segúries =

- Municipality
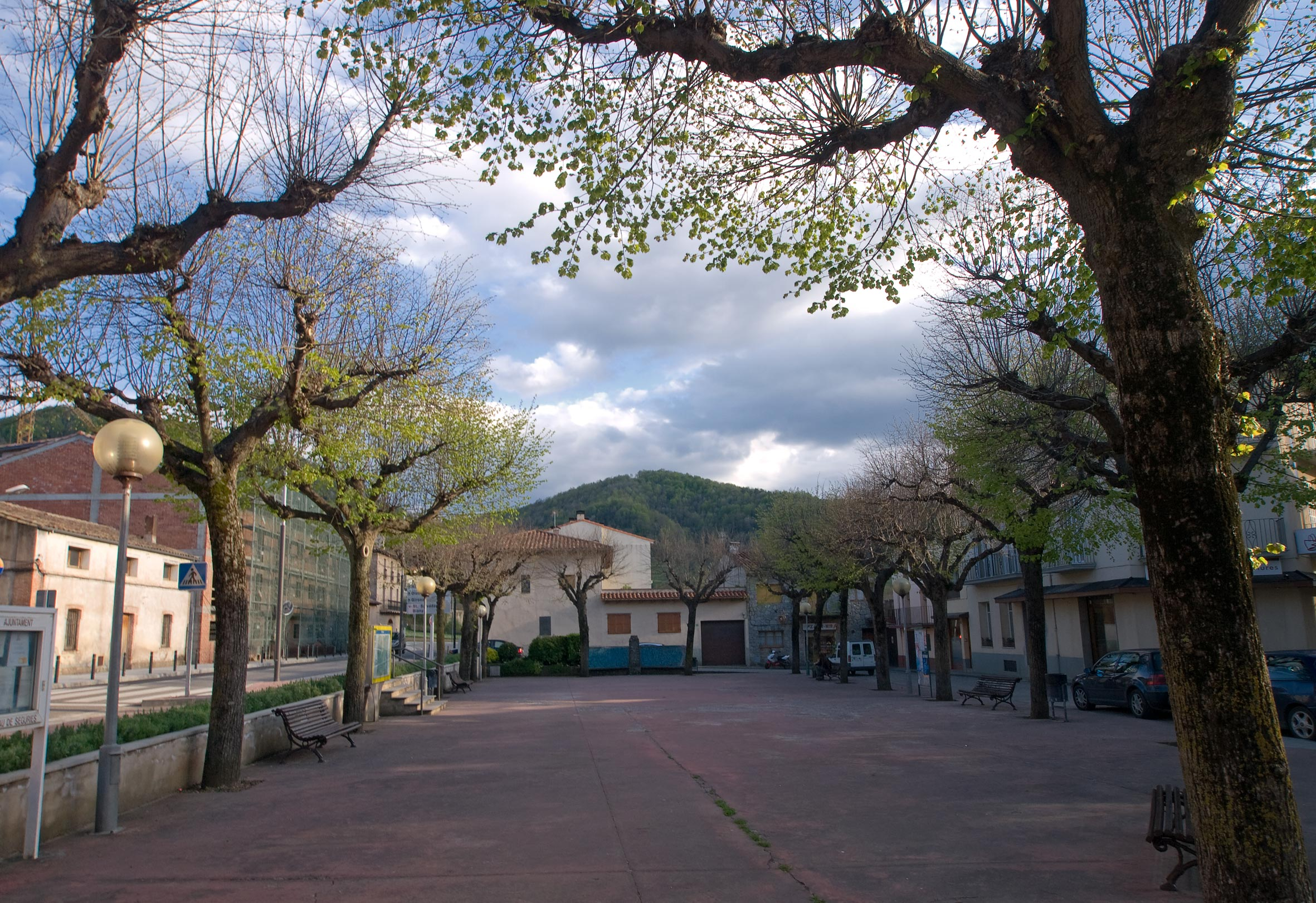
- Square in Sant Pau de Segúries

- Flag Coat of arms

- Location in Catalonia Sant Pau de Segúries (Spain)
- Coordinates: 42°15′49″N 2°22′0″E
- Country: Spain
- Community: Catalonia
- Province: Girona
- Comarca: Ripollès

Government
  - Mayor: Dolors Cambras Saques (2015)

Area
  - Total: 8.7 km^{2} (3.4 sq mi)

Population (2025-01-01)
  - Total: 719
  - Density: 83/km^{2} (210/sq mi)
- Website: www.santpauseguries.cat

Sant Pau de Segúries (Catalan pronunciation: [ˈsam ˈpaw ðə səˈɣuɾiəs]) is a village in the province of Girona and autonomous community of Catalonia, Spain.
