= Sant Aniol d'Agulla =

Church building in Catalonia, Spain

Coordinates: 42.316925°N 2.588°E

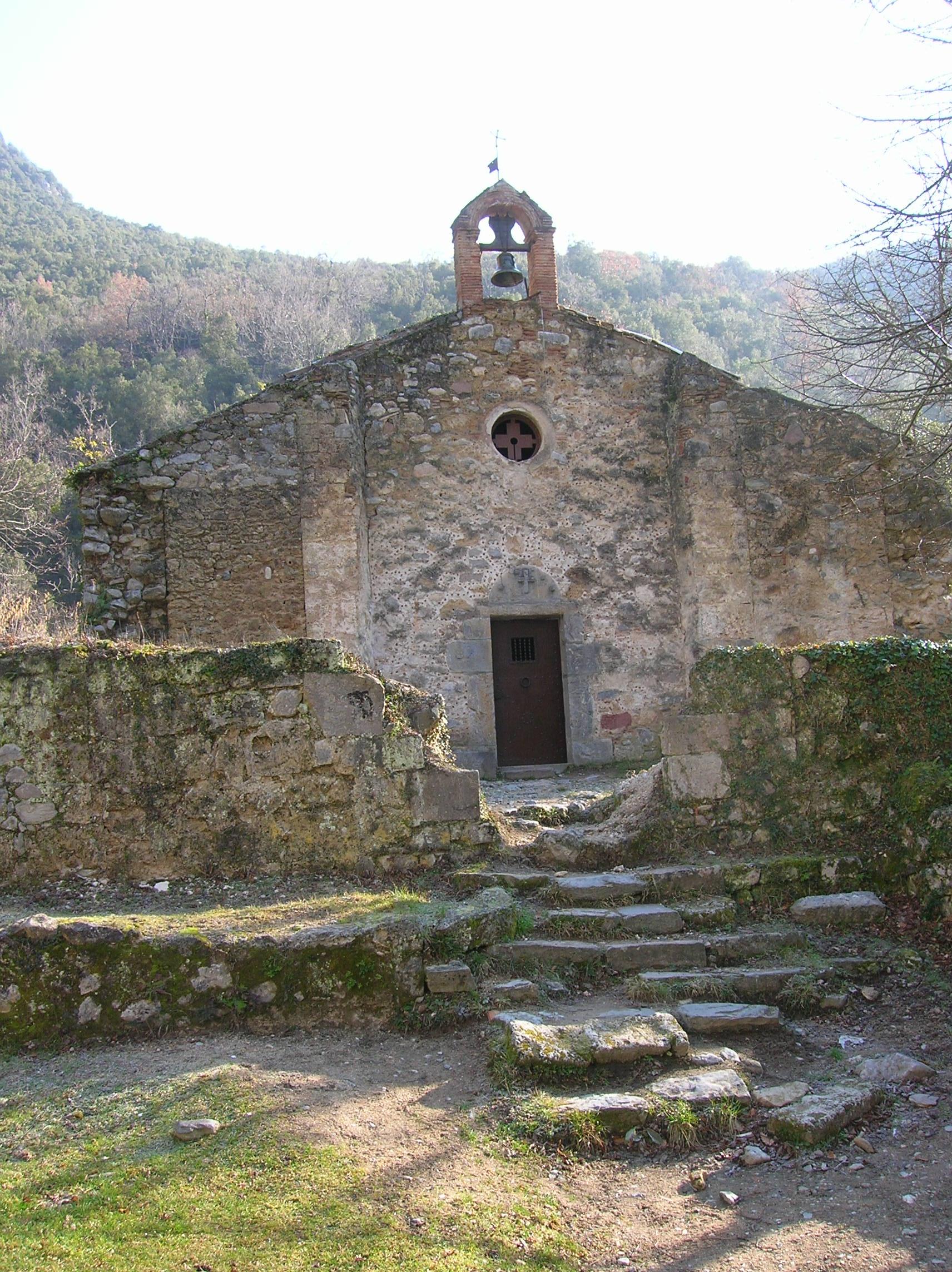
Sant Aniol d'Aguja

Sant Aniol d'Agulla is a Benedictine monastery in Montagut i Oix, Province of Girona, Catalonia, Spain. It was declared a Cultural Asset of National Interest in 1983.

== History ==
The monastery was founded in the year 859 by a group of Benedictine monks from St. Mary of Arles from Vallespir, which had been plundered by the Normans. In the year 872, Racimir, the first abbot of the new monastery, obtained from the Frankish king Charles the Bald recognition of a territory, which included possession of the church of Sant Llorenç de Mont. Sant Aniol d'Aguja was a small monastery in a secluded area with few resources, making it unable to attract a large religious community. The institution was soon brought under the control of the canons of the cathedral of Girona, already documented in the year 899. In 1003, the monastery of Sant Aniol d'Aguja came under the control of Sant Llorenç de Mont. Sant Aniol d'Aguja became a simple parish church dependent on Sant Llorenç de Mont, which in turn depended on Sant Feliu de Riu.

Pilgrims to the monastery have been replaced by hikers attracted by the natural environment of the valley, which bears the same name. The ancient parish was annexed to Santa Cecilia de Sadernes.

== Architecture and fittings ==
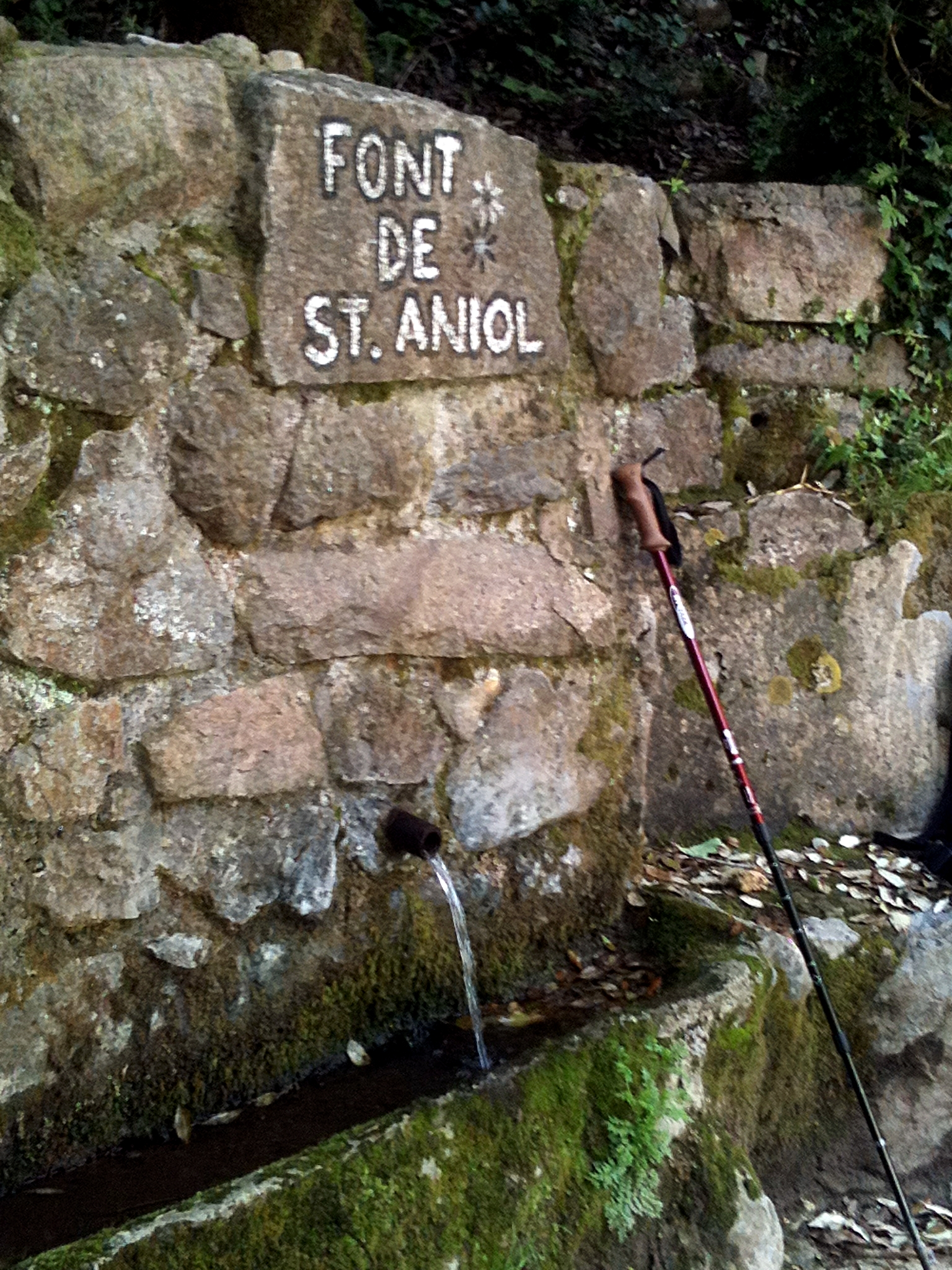
Fountain in the monastery's wall

The Romanesque building dates from the 11th century. The small structures has a single nave covered with a barrel vault with a low rise. It has a semicircular apse decorated with lesena and blind arches typical of Lombard/Romanesque-style. The roof is pitched. Until 1936, there was an attached structure in the front, with cover and wooden beams, which sank. This space is now a small courtyard, which is accessed by a stone staircase. The facade was rebuilt after 1949 by soldiers guarding the border. A new bell named "Coralí" was placed in the small bell tower in 1962.

The interior contains a step ramp which leads to a crypt with an underground chapel carved into the rock, known as the Cave of the Abbot. Its walls have flowing water which contain, according to tradition, healing properties.

== Bibliography ==
- Catalunya romànica, 27 vols., Barcelona, Enciclopèdia Catalana, 1984-1998, vol. 4 (1990), pp. 270-273.
- R. Guardiola i Rovira, "El aplec de San Aniol", Revista de Girona, 7 (1959), 89.
- R. Grabolosa i Puigredon, "L'aplec a Sant Aniol", Revista de Girona, 79 (1977), 181-182.
