= Sant Aniol de Finestres =

- Municipality
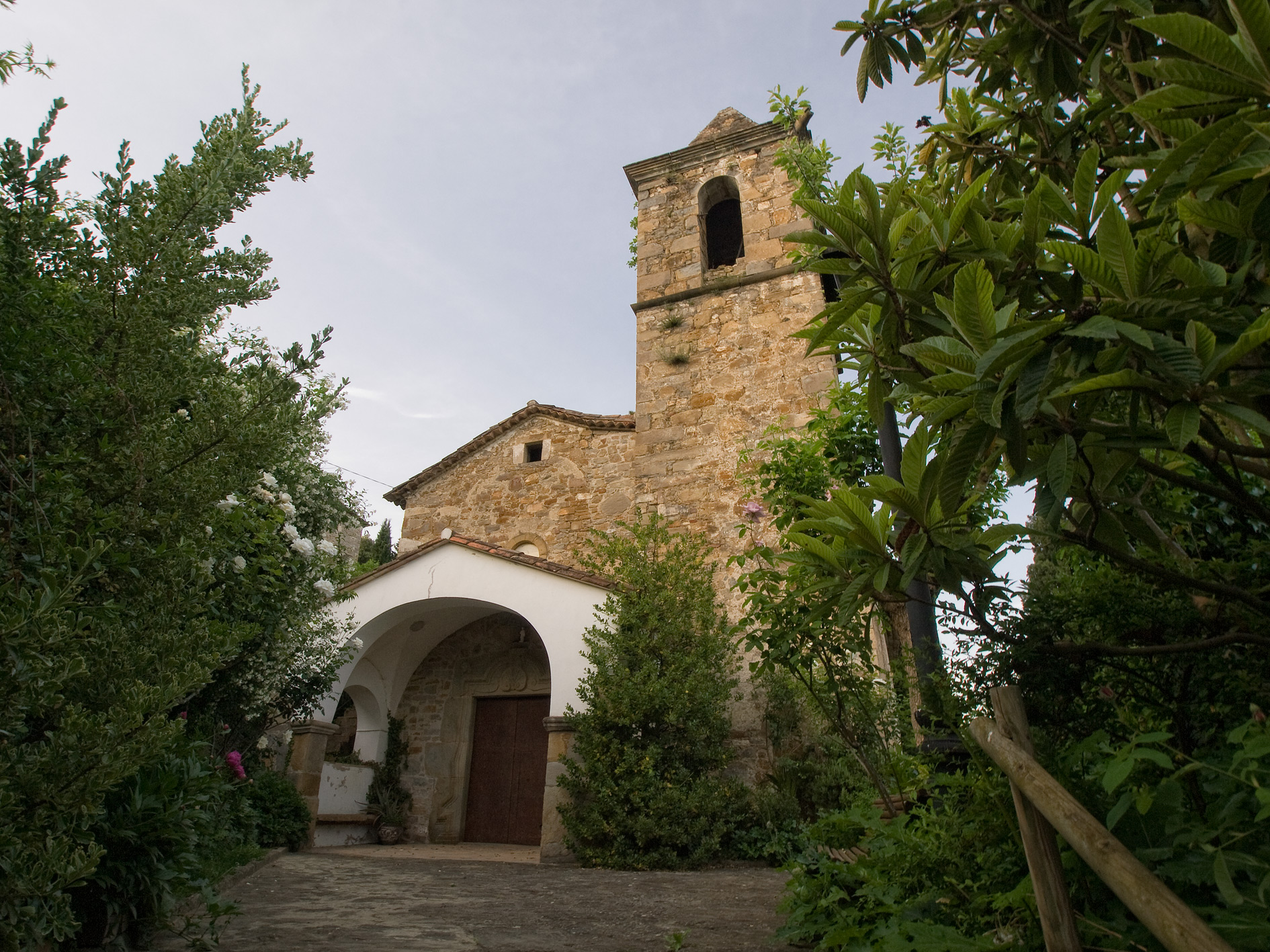
- Church of Sant Aniol

- Flag Coat of arms

- Location in Catalonia
- Coordinates: 42°4′20″N 2°36′56″E
- Country: Spain
- Community: Catalonia
- Province: Girona
- Comarca: Garrotxa

Government
  - Mayor: Francesc Oliveras Torrent (2015) (CiU)

Area
  - Total: 47.7 km^{2} (18.4 sq mi)
- Elevation: 415 m (1,362 ft)

Population (2025-01-01)
  - Total: 382
  - Density: 8.01/km^{2} (20.7/sq mi)
- Postal code: 17183
- Website: www.santaniol.cat

Sant Aniol de Finestres (Catalan pronunciation: [ˌsantəniˈɔl də fiˈnestɾəs]) is a municipality in the comarca of Garrotxa in Girona, Catalonia, Spain.

== Villages ==
- La Barroca, 15
- Sant Esteve de Llémena, 221
- Sant Aniol de Finestres, 55
