= Garrotxa =

Coordinates: 42°10′17″N 2°33′17″E

- Comarca
- Country: Spain
- Autonomous community: Catalonia
- Region: Comarques Gironines
- Province: Girona
- Capital: Olot
- Municipalities: List: Argelaguer, Besalú, Beuda, Castellfollit de la Roca, Maià de Montcal, Mieres, Montagut i Oix, Olot, Les Planes d'Hostoles, Les Preses, Riudaura, Sales de Llierca, Sant Aniol de Finestres, Sant Feliu de Pallerols, Sant Ferriol, Sant Jaume de Llierca, Sant Joan les Fonts, Santa Pau, Tortellà, La Vall d'en Bas, La Vall de Bianya

Government
  - Body: Garrotxa Comarcal Council
  - President: Santi Reixach (Junts)

Area
  - Total: 734.5 km^{2} (283.6 sq mi)

Population (2016)
  - Total: 55,999
  - Density: 76.24/km^{2} (197.5/sq mi)
- Demonym
- Time zone: UTC+1 (CET)
  - Summer (DST): UTC+2 (CEST)
- Largest municipality: Olot

Garrotxa (Catalan pronunciation: [ɡəˈrɔtʃə]) is a comarca (county) in the Girona region, Catalonia, Spain. Its population in 2016 was 55,999, more than half of them in the capital city of Olot. It is roughly equivalent to the historical County of Besalú.

== Geography ==
Garrotxa borders the comarques of Ripollès, Osona, Selva, Gironès, Pla de l'Estany, Alt Empordà, and Vallespir. It includes the upper basin of the River Fluvià and the headwaters of the rivers Muga, Amer and Llémena.

From both the human point of view and that of physical geography, the comarca has a clear division into two subcomarques. Extending north from the valley of the Fluvià, is Alta Garrotxa (Upper Garrotxa), while the southern part is sometimes called the comarca of Olot, after the capital city.

The Fluvià flows toward the Mediterranean, and has a relatively small flow of water (1.07 m³/s at Olot).

The high humidity of Garrotxa contrasts with that of the neighboring comarques. Annual rainfall is over 1000 mm (about 40 inches). It is said that "Si no plou a Olot, no plou enlloc" ("if it's not raining in Olot, it is not raining anywhere."). Winter temperatures hover around freezing; in August, temperatures average 27.7 °C (about 80 °F). Thermal inversions are relatively common; Alta Garrotxa and Puigsacalm, particularly, have more of a mountain climate, with snowfall figuring more prominently.

Vegetation varies with the climate. Alta Garrotxa and the east part of the comarca have typically Mediterranean climate and vegetation; the rest has a sub-Mediterranean climate, tending toward an Atlantic climate in the most humid areas.

=== Volcanic zone ===
In the western part of the comarca, the land around Olot and Santa Pau contains some 40 well-preserved volcanic cones at Croscat, important flows of basaltic lava, and the volcano of Santa Margarida. This zone is protected within the 120.07 km² Parc Natural de la Zona Volcànica de la Garrotxa.

The populated areas are mostly located on the plain and hillsides of Olot. A field of lava covers most of the plain (some 25 km²), and lava flows continue down the valley of the Fluvià to Sant Jaume de Llierca. Another important sector is in the tectonic valley of the River Ser, at the foot of the fault scarp of the Corb and Finestres ranges, with the volcanoes of Santa Margarida and Croscat. Lava flowed down the valley, past Sallent de Santa Pau to the Gibert mill. A third group of volcanoes lies in the Llémena river valley and the stream of Adri.

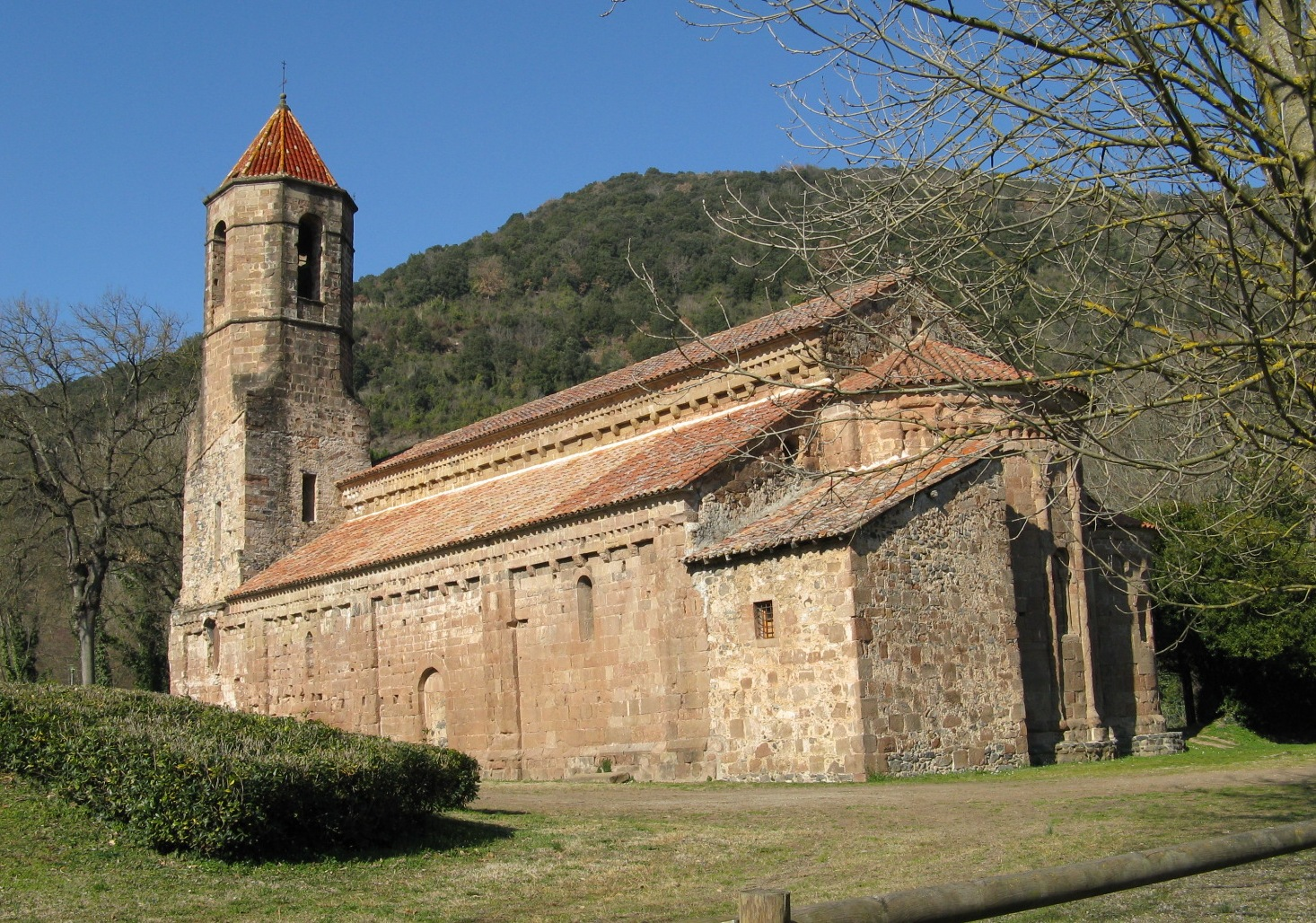
Romanesque monastery of Sant Joan les Fonts

The field became active about 700,000 years ago, with the last eruption occurring 11,500 years ago. There appear to have been old eruptions around Olot, because one can find basalt boulders from the Pliocene era in the valley of the Fluvià.

In 1982, the Generalitat de Catalunya declared the zone comprising the valleys of the Fluvià and Ser and the upper part of the valleys of Aiguavella and Sant Iscle to be Natural Places of National Interest. They also declared most of the volcanic cones and the Fageda d'en Jordà (beech woods rooted in lava) to be Integral Geobotanical Reserves.

== Population and economic activity ==
9.4% of the population are engaged in agriculture and primary production, 59.4% in industry and energy, and 31.2% in the service sectors. Agricultural land has been shrinking, but Garrotxa remains the leading producer of maize. The livestock sector is actually expanding, especially pigs and cattle.

Industry, centered on Olot, Sant Joan les Fonts, and Besalú, has been generally on the rise since 1940. The most important industries are textiles, especially knitwear, the processing of locally grown food, and metallurgy. Behind these come papermaking, chemistry, and plastics.

Arts and crafts are traditional also, being the Olot Art School (Escola d'Art i Superior de Disseny d'Olot) one of the oldest ones in Catalonia.

== Municipalities ==
Municipalities of la Garrotxa

Municipality	Population (2014)	Area km^{2}
Argelaguer	425	12.5
Besalú	2,400	4.9
Beuda	200	35.9
Castellfollit de la Roca	1,013	0.7
Maià de Montcal	443	17.3
Mieres	326	26.3
Montagut i Oix	970	93.7
Olot	33,913	29.0
Les Planes d'Hostoles	1,694	37.5
Les Preses	1,772	9.4
Riudaura	463	23.6
Sales de Llierca	133	35.8
Sant Aniol de Finestres	351	47.7
Sant Feliu de Pallerols	1,353	34.9
Sant Ferriol	240	42.2
Sant Jaume de Llierca	812	6.8
Sant Joan les Fonts	2,919	31.9
Santa Pau	1,567	49.0
Tortellà	772	11.1
La Vall d'en Bas	2,965	90.7
La Vall de Bianya	1,305	93.6
• Total: 21	56,036	734.5

== See also ==
- Catalan Transversal Range
- Sub-Pyrenees
