= Montagut i Oix =

- Municipality
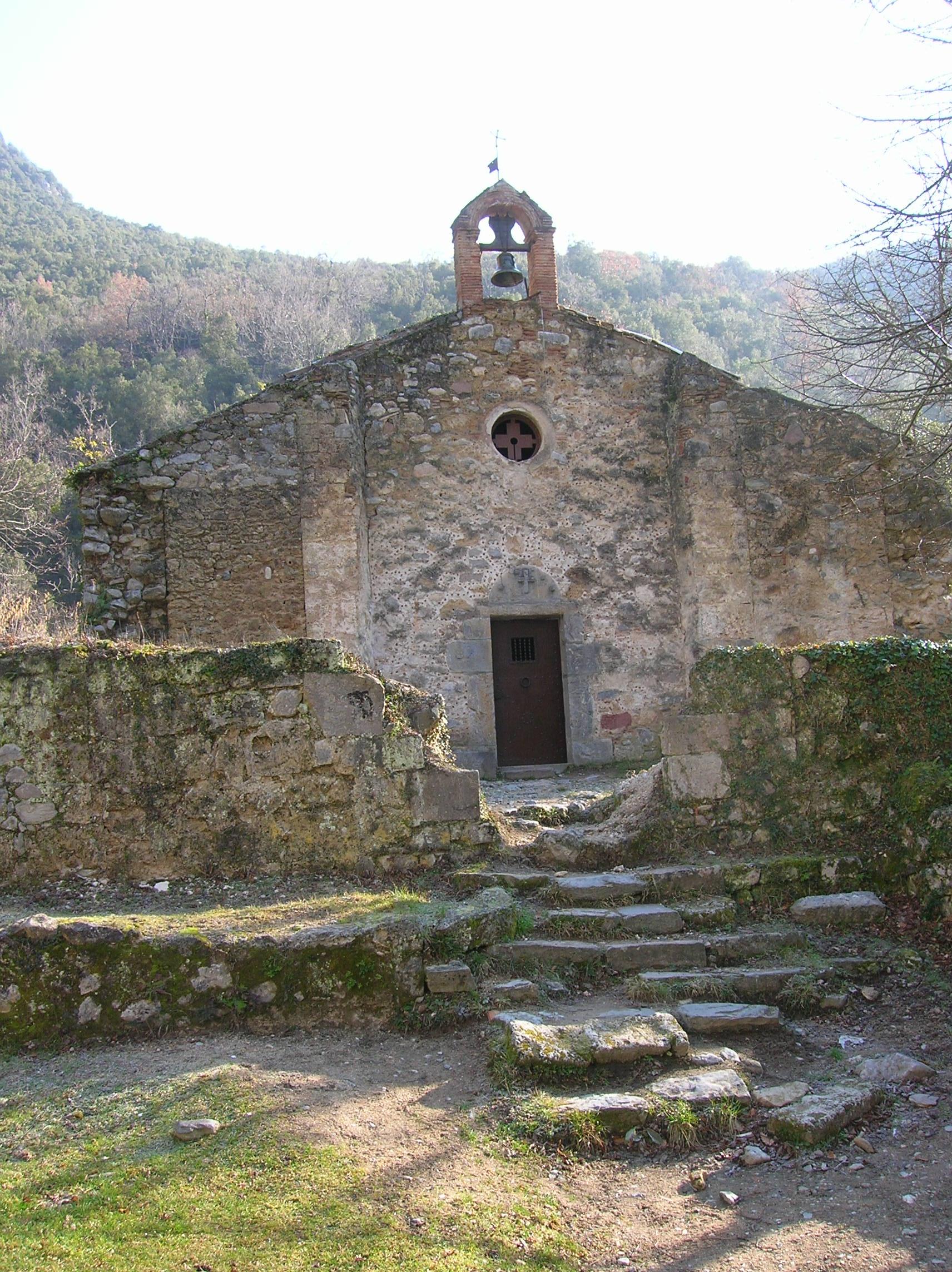
- Church of Sant Aniol d'Aguja

- Flag Coat of arms

- Location in Catalonia Montagut i Oix (Spain)
- Coordinates: 42.231°N 2.597°E
- Country: Spain
- Community: Catalonia
- Province: Girona
- Comarca: Garrotxa

Government
  - Mayor: Mònica Boix Pagès (2015)

Area
  - Total: 93.7 km^{2} (36.2 sq mi)

Population (2025-01-01)
  - Total: 1,011
  - Density: 10.8/km^{2} (27.9/sq mi)
- Website: montagut-oix.cat

Montagut i Oix (Catalan pronunciation: [muntəˈɣut i ˈoʃ]) is a village in the province of Girona and autonomous community of Catalonia, Spain. The municipality covers an area of 93.76 square kilometres (36.20 sq mi) and the population in 2014 was 970.
