= Fluvià =

River in Catalonia, Spain

Coordinates: 42°12′07″N 3°06′38″E

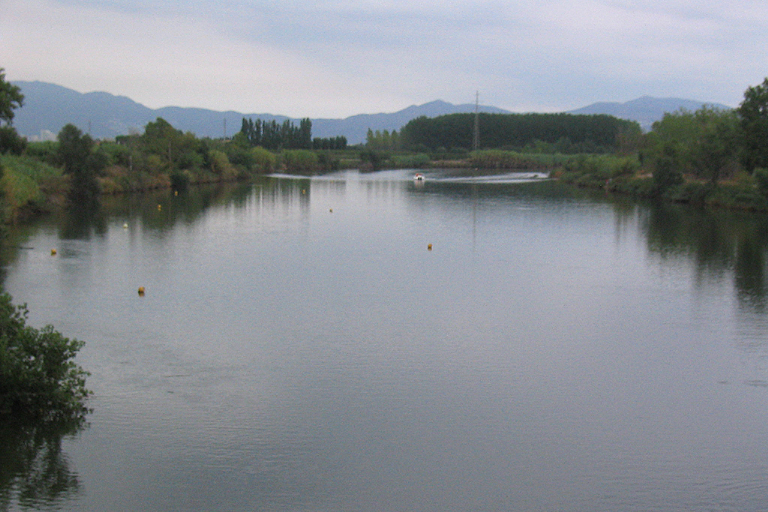
Fluvià River

The Fluvià (Catalan pronunciation: [fluβiˈa]; Spanish: Fluviá) is a river in Catalonia. It rises in the Serralada Transversal in the comarca of Garrotxa, passes through Olot and Besalú, and flows into the Mediterranean Sea near Sant Pere Pescador. The ancient city of Empúries was founded near the mouth of the Fluvià, when it was 6 km south of its present location.

== See also ==
- List of rivers of Spain
