= Museu de la Garrotxa =

Museum in Olot, Spain

Museu Comarcal de la Garrotxa
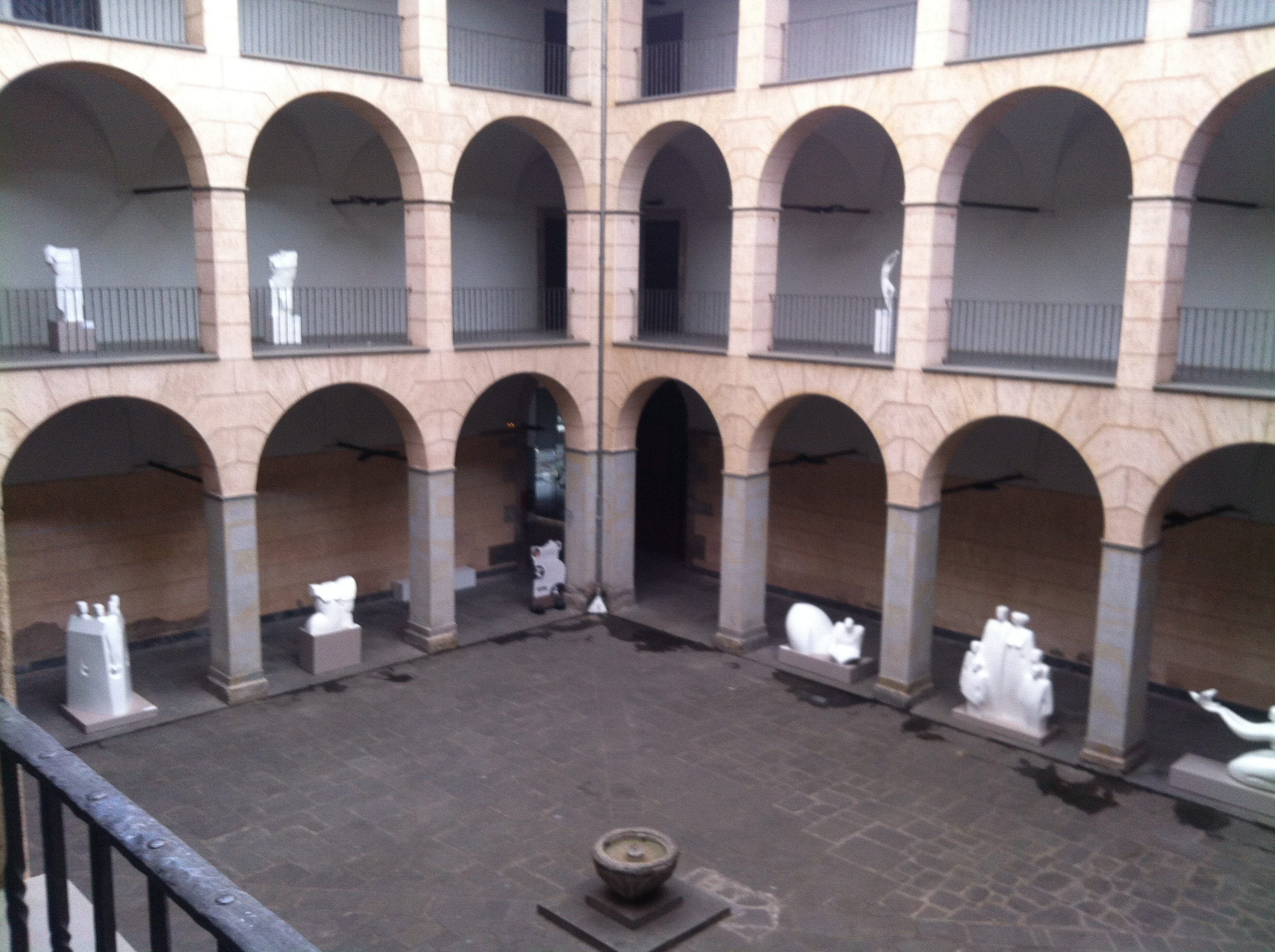
- Established: 1982
- Location: Olot, Catalonia, Spain
- Coordinates: 42.1812°N 2.4894°E
- Director: Montserrat Mallol
- Curator: Gabriel Alcalde i Gurt
- Website: museus.olot.cat/museus/#museus_de_la_garrotxa

The Museu de la Garrotxa (Regional Museum of Garrotxa) is a museum in Olot, Catalonia, Spain. It is associated with the Museu Nacional d'Art de Catalunya in Barcelona; the other institutions in this association are the Biblioteca Museu Víctor Balaguer (Vilanova i la Geltrú) and the Cau Ferrat (Sitges). The museum is housed in an 18th-century neoclassical building designed by architect Ventura Rodríguez.

The museum opened for the first time to the public in 1905 as the Museu Biblioteca de Olot. The museum developed over time, adding new collections and changing its exhibition spaces; such as the addition of nativity scenes in 1956, the Blay Hall in 1966, and the Josep Clarà Hall in 1977. The Museum was re-established in 1982 as the Museu Comarcal de la Garrotxa following an agreement between the city government of Olot and the Generalitat of Catalonia.

The museum includes ethnological, archeological, and historical collections related to the comarca of Garrotxa as well as art collections focused on 18th- to 20th-century art, particularly art belonging to the Olot school of landscape painting. The museum holds art by the brothers Joaquín Vayreda and Mariano Vayreda, Josep Berga i Boix, Xavier Nogués, Joaquín Mir, and Ramon Casas, and sculptures by Ramón Amadeu, Leonci Quera, Josep Clarà, and Miquel Blay. The museum also has halls for temporary exhibitions, conferences, and courses.
