= Museum of the Saints, Olot =

Coordinates: 41°22′06″N 2°09′12″E

Olot Saints Museum
- Museu dels Sants d'Olot
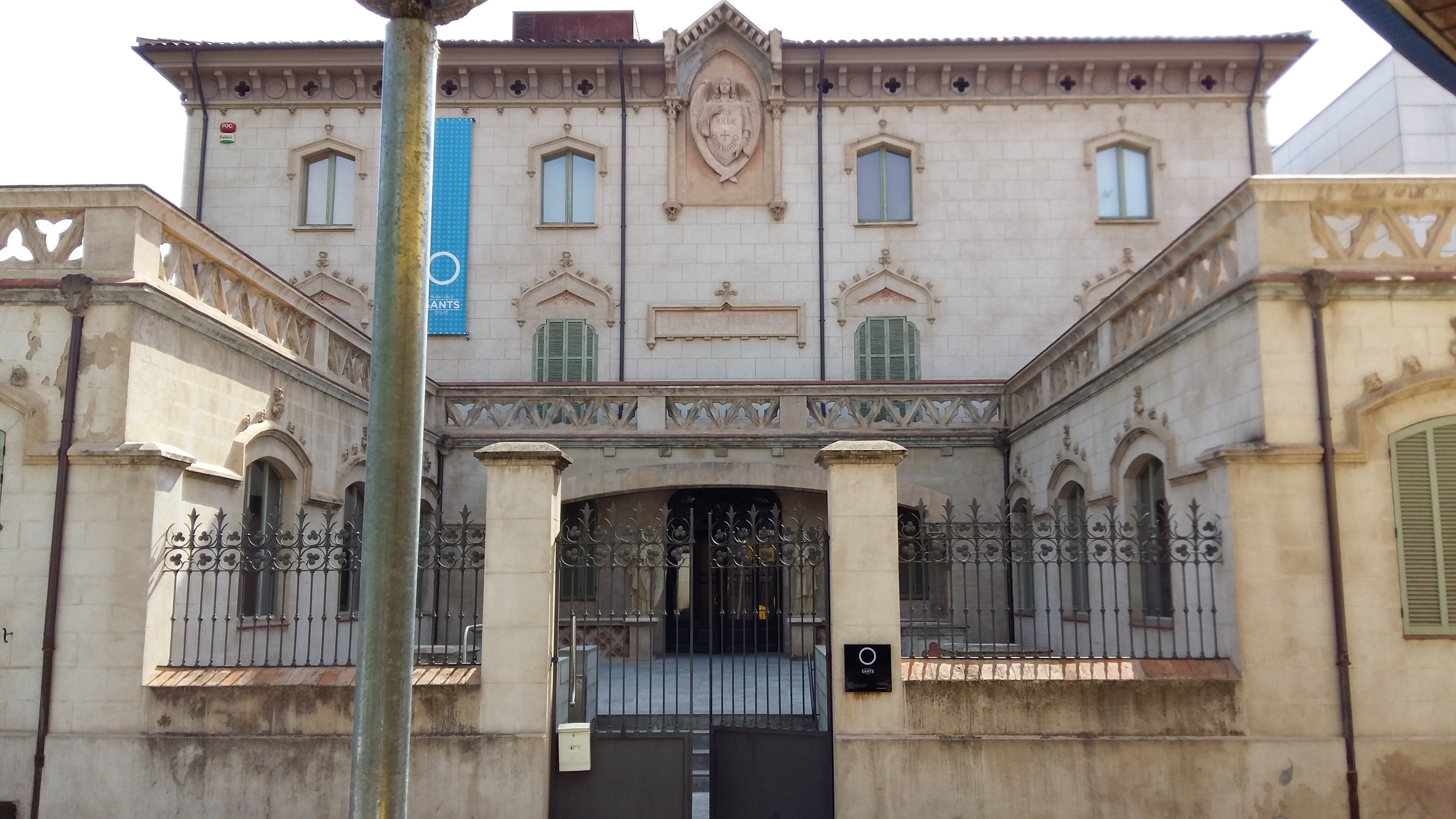
- View of the outside of the Olot Saints Museum
- Established: 2007
- Location: Olot (Catalonia)
- Type: Craft museum
- Director: Montserrat Mallol
- Website: museus.olot.cat/museu-dels-sants

The Olot Saints Museum opened in 2007 in Olot (Girona), and is devoted to housing items related to the craft of creating religious imagery. With the aim of broadening its appeal, it also includes other crafts, popular and traditional culture, and the life and work of Marian Vayreda, one of the founders of the first workshops to make religious figurines in the city, along with his brother Joaquim and Josep Berga i Boix. The workshop was known as, "Arte Cristiano" (Christian Art).

Marià Vayreda, painter and writer, lived on the first floor of the Museum, where he wrote the novel "La punyalada" (The stab), a masterpiece of Catalan literature.

The Museum is housed in a 19th-century Gothic Revival building known as "Arte Cristiano". Construction began in 1890 following the designs of the modernist architect Joaquim Codina i Matalí, commissioned by Joaquim Vayreda.
