= Pedro Llosas Badía =

Spanish politician (1870–1955)

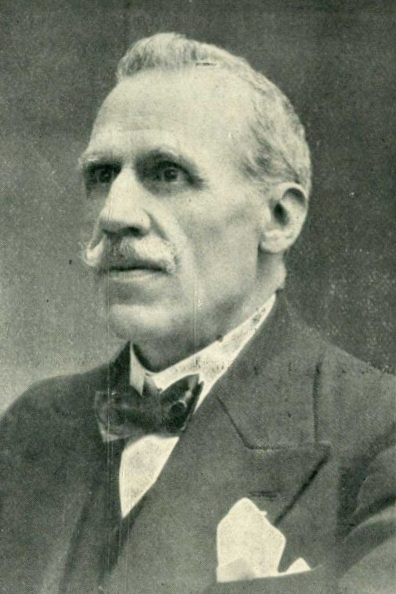
- Born: Pedro Llosas Badía; 1870; Olot
- Died: 1955 (aged 84–85); Olot
- Occupation: banker
- Known for: politician
- Political party: Carlism, UP

Pedro Llosas y Badía (Catalan: Pere Llosas i Badia) (1870–1955) was a Spanish right-wing politician. Active in Catalonia, he was first associated with the Carlists and then with the Primo de Rivera regime. He was the longest-serving Carlist deputy from Catalonia during the Restauración but is known mostly as the civil governor of provinces of the Baleares (1921–1922, 1926–1930) and La Coruña (1925–1926).

== Family and youth ==
Corpus Christi, Olot, 1894

The Llosas family has traditionally been active in the Catalan textile industry as cotton weavers; in the 19th century they established themselves in middle-low range of the local bourgeoisie. Paternal grandfather of Pedro, Juan Llosas Pujol, originated from Olot (Girona province), located in the comarca of Alta Garrotxa at the Pyrenean foothills. His son and Pedro's father, Juan Llosas Tenas (died 1872), in early years left his native region for Albacete, for over 20 years assisting his uncle in running a textile business. When the shop was inherited by his cousin, Albert Escubós Llosas, he returned to Olot and married Rosa Badía Trull (died 1896), a native of El Sallent. The couple possessed land properties in the neighboring Santa Pau and Mieres. Pedro was the only child of the couple.

Except that he was very early orphaned by his father, next to nothing is known about Pedro's early childhood in Olot, a town that became a headquarters of Carlism during the Third Carlist War. In 1882 he entered the nearby Seminario-Colegio de Santa María del Collell, originally an ecclesiastic seminary in 1876 merged with Instituto de Segunda Enseñanza de Girona; the establishment allowed pursuing a religious path but offered also commercial studies. In 1887 he obtained bachillerato, officially issued by Instituto de Girona, and enrolled at Facultad de Filosofía y Letras in the University of Barcelona. Llosas graduated in 1890, his dissertation dedicated to the Gracchus land reforms in the ancient Rome and acknowledged with excellent marks. He pursued a scientific path later on, already when he served as deputy in Madrid; in 1915 he graduated in Madrid in history, his thesis titled Renaixement de Catalunya, època del rei Martí l'Humà; also later he remained particularly interested in archeology. One source refers to him as „abogado”.

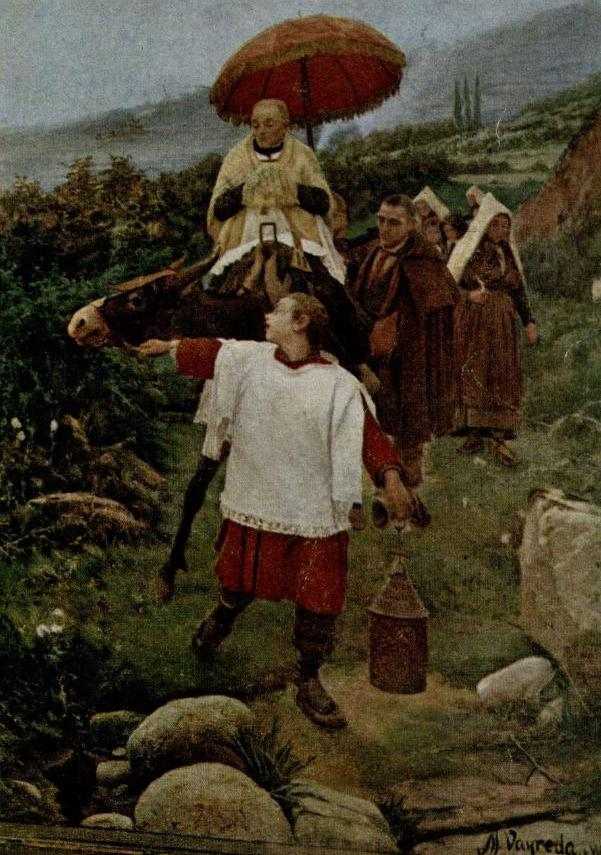
Viático by Vayreda

Having returned to Olot in 1893 Llosas Badía married Anna Serat-Calvó y Plana (died 1942); they settled at calle de San Jerónimo 47. In 1895 he and two relatives founded a local bank, Banco Llosas, Escubós y Puigmitjà, which proved successful and remained their property until the mid-1920s. Pedro and Anna had 6 children, born between 1894 and 1904, but the family life was marked by recurring tragedies: María died in early infancy, Rosa - who married Joaquin Vayreda Aulet, son the Olot Traditionalist painter and author, Marian Vayreda - died at 23 in 1918, Nonito died also at 23 in 1921 and Juan died at 41 in 1933. Of the two surviving, Martirián Llosas y Serrat-Calvó - also a Carlist - was active in the Barcelona juvenile court, during early Francoism serving briefly as president of the Gerona diputacion and rising to president judge of Tribunal Tutelar de Menores de Barcelona and president of Union Nacional de Tribunales Tutelares de Menores, apart from having been president of Obra Tutelar Agraria for 27 years. Miguel Llosas y Serrat-Calvó pursued a law career and was also active as judge for the minors, but became a public figure mostly as a man of letters. Apart from lesser works on history and culture; his major study focusing on ancient Rome, Berenice, was published posthumously.

== Carlist ==
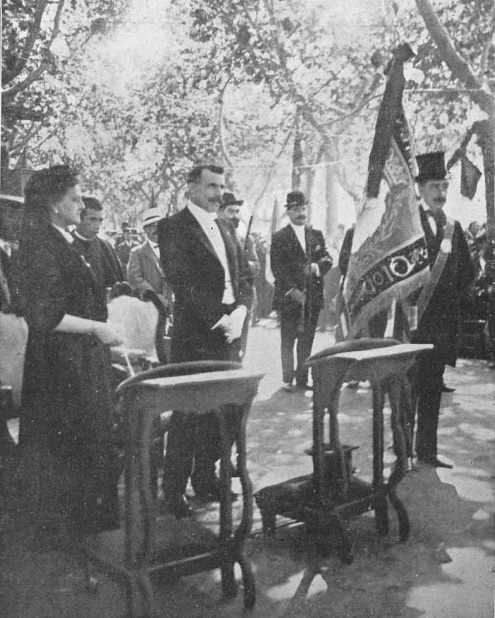
Llosas in Olot, 1911

In the late 19th century Olot was among Catalan Carlist strongholds. Painting activity of Escuela de Olot and literary works of Marian Vayreda y Vila made it cultural centre of regional Traditionalism and conservative Catalanism. The young Pedro – though nothing is known about political preferences of his ancestors – was growing exposed and actively engaged in both. In 1891 he was already reported as secretary of the local Centre Catalanista, 1892 growing to its vice-president; during his early years he also entered the local Circulo Tradicionalista, at unspecified date rising to its president. In the mid-1890s Llosas was also busy in local Olotense and regional Catalan Catholic initiatives. Apart from organizational work he was active as a speaker and especially as an author, contributing to periodicals like L’Olotí and El Deber, though also Diario de Olot and El Ateneo; his writings revealed a knack for culture and history. Known locally, until the early 20th century Llosas did not emerge as a recognized figure in Catalan Carlism.

In 1897 Llosas was elected to the Olot ayuntamiento, becoming the third teniente de alcalde, president of Comisión de Gobernación and member of the other two. During the following term he grew to the first teniente de alcalde, president of Comisión de Fomento and vocal of the central, hospital and economy commissions, in 1900 briefly serving as alcalde. In 1903 Llosas presented his candidature to the provincial self-government of Girona; he stood as a "regionalista". Elected from the Olot-Puigcerda district, he served as diputado until 1907. In the provincial self-government he represented a Traditionalist version of regionalism, declaring himself a Catalanist and anti-centralist; his opening address in the chamber was in Catalan, an extravaganza which earned him admonition by the president. As member of diputación he inspired and supported a new Olot Traditionalist periodical, La Tradició Catalana. At that time he also published pamphlets formatted as discourses on political philosophy.

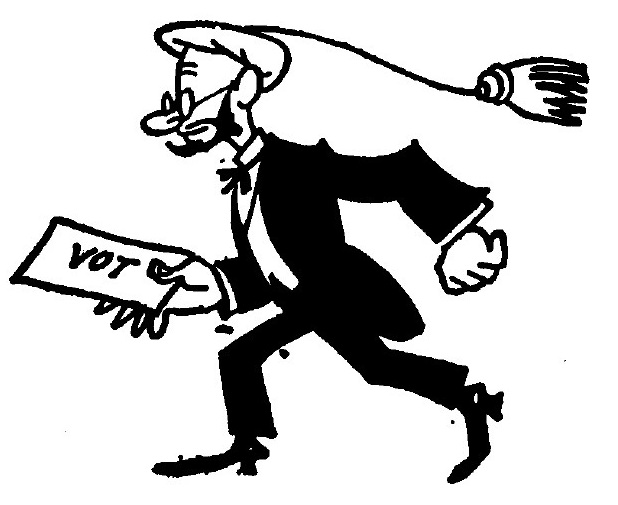
ridícol jaumista, 1914

In mid-1900s Llosas decided to run for the Cortes. The Olot district voted Carlists in the late 19th century, but in the 1899-1907 it was conquered by La Lliga. The two competing groupings joined ranks in 1907, together with the Republicans forming Solidaritat Catalana. Though some solidaris accepted Llosas with difficulty, the strategy paid off; he was among seven Carlists voted in from Catalonia. The alliance soon disintegrated, but also in the following years La Lliga and the Carlists avoided fielding candidates in the same districts; as Olot was left to the Carlists, Llosas retained his mandate in successive campaigns of 1910, 1914 (when he ran as independent) and 1916 (declared victorious with no challenger), having been member of a small, depending upon term 6 to 14-member Carlist minority. His parliamentarian activity – vibrant especially during earlier terms - was marked mostly by defense of Catholic Church and by his modest Catalanism, culminating in confronting the government sponsored Ley del Candado. He was counted among representatives of Catalan "carlisme nou"; in 1912 he entered the Carlist national executive.

== Bewildered ==
Carlist standard

In the late 1910s the Catalan Carlism was undergoing rapid fragmentation, marked by at least three not necessarily overlapping division lines: between supporters of the key party theorist Vázquez de Mella versus supporters of the claimant, between those approaching nascent Catalanism with sympathy versus those viewing it with caution, and between a faction favoring wide conservative alliances versus a faction sticking to stand-alone intransigence. Though a 1912 Carlist propaganda publication hailed his „acrisolada lealtad a los ideales Católico-Monárquicos”, Llosas was not immune to growing confusion.

In Girona the key division line was about the Catalan question. Llosas, unlike other key Carlist from the province Dalmacio Iglesias, tended to demonstrate more attraction for Catalanism than the official party executive would allow. In 1917 he took part in Parliamentary Assembly, a gathering of some 70 senators and deputies mostly from Catalonia. Called in the wake of growing social tension, the congregation declared the Restoration political system defunct and assumed a potentially revolutionary shape, pursuing also a highly regionalist model of state. Since the Carlists decided to abstain, Llosas joined the initiative on his own; some authors claim that he broke with the party, but others underline that proposals of the Assembly were later supported by the Carlists.

The 1918 electoral campaign produced total bewilderment. Despite Llosas’ taking part in the pro-Catalanist Assembly, La Lliga terminated the truce with the Carlists and fielded his counter-candidate in Olot. The Carlists themselves were divided into 3 factions led by Junyent, Iglesias and Llosas, the latter turned against La Lliga running as an ultra-Right anti-regionalist hopeful. Despite his differences with party executive, he was widely referred to as "carlí", "jaumí" or "tradicionalista". By a narrow margin he seemed to have lost to his Lliguero rival. He protested, pressing charges of corruption; investigations and backstage haggling continued until he was finally declared defeated.

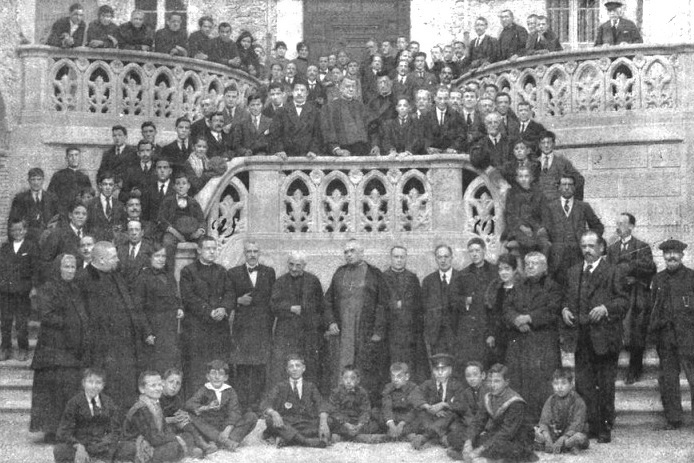
Llosas with bishops, Colegio de Santa María del Collell, 1919

When the internal Carlist conflict between de Mella and Don Jaime exploded in 1919 Llosas seemed posed to join the rebels. In the Cortes under the influence of the former and sharing his penchant for grand conservative alliances, initially he tended to stand against the claimant. Eventually he declared himself neutral; indeed, after the breakup he was listed neither among the breakaway Mellistas nor the loyal Jaimistas. Instead, he neared the right wing of disintegrating Conservatives, the Mauristas; in the 1919 electoral campaign he unsuccessfully ran for the Senate as a governmental candidate, defeated for the upper chamber also in 1921 with only 16% of the votes gathered; some kept referring to him as "jaimista".

Llosas's affair with the Mauristas continued; in October 1921 Maura, prime minister at that time, appointed him civil governor of the Balearic Islands. Little is known about his tenure; according to present-day scholar, he demonstrated rather heavy hand and acted along "lógica dins un sistema caciquista basat en la venjanca", having been firm element of the caciquismo structure. For reasons which are not clear he resigned from the governor post in April 1922 and returned to Olot.

== Primoderiverista ==
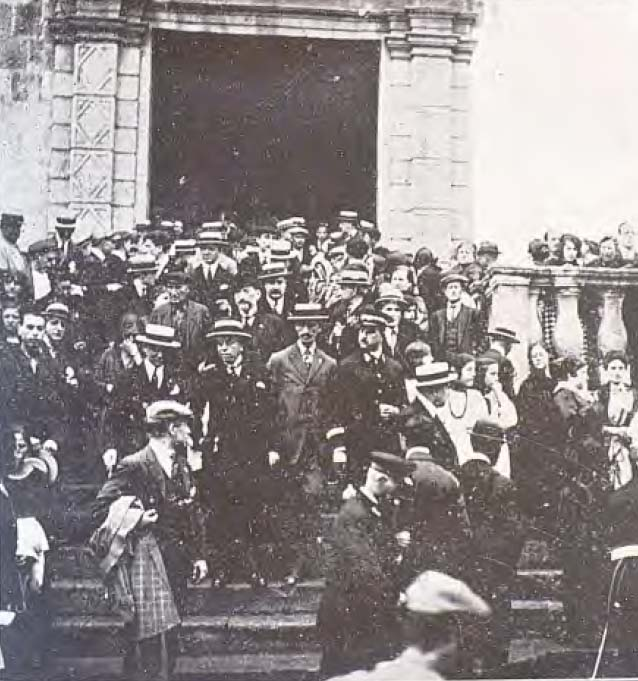
Mancomunitat, 1920s

Llosas welcomed the 1923 coup of general Primo de Rivera and already in 1924 he was busy setting up provincial structures of nascent Unión Patriótica; he emerged heading the Olot branch, though he did not enter the provincial Girona executive. Also 1924 he was nominated to two Catalan self-government bodies, provincial and regional ones, normally elected but its members appointed under the new dictatorial regime. One was Diputación Provincial of Girona, whose members elected him president of the body. Another was Permanent Council of Mancomunitat de Catalunya; he briefly served as Conseller de Ferrocarrils i Obres Hidràuliques and member of Consell de Pedagogia, before becoming member of Consell de Cultura. At the latter post he shielded Institut d'Estudis Catalans from growing españolismo, advocated introduction of Catalan to schools and developed local libraries.

In 1924 the Girona diputación addressed Primo with a Llosas-inspired document, which opposed centralization designs of Catalan capitán general Barrera and advanced a highly regionalist vision of state in general and Catalonia in particular. The paper proposed a province-centred organization of Catalonia modeled on the Vascongadas. It suggested that on the regional level Mancomunitat, itself deemed artificial, is replaced by a new body, Diputación Regional, its members delegated from provincial chambers, themselves elected on universal, corporative and municipal basis. However, the new primoderiverista Estatuto Provincial potentially led to dissolution of regional bodies; anxious to retain some regional co-ordination, Llosas failed to convince other members of the Girona diputation, who effectively buried the idea of Mancomunitat. Acknowledging defeat Llosas resigned as head of Girona self-government. Nevertheless, he took part in works of Comissió Gestora entrusted with phasing out Mancomunitat until the body ceased to exist in 1925.

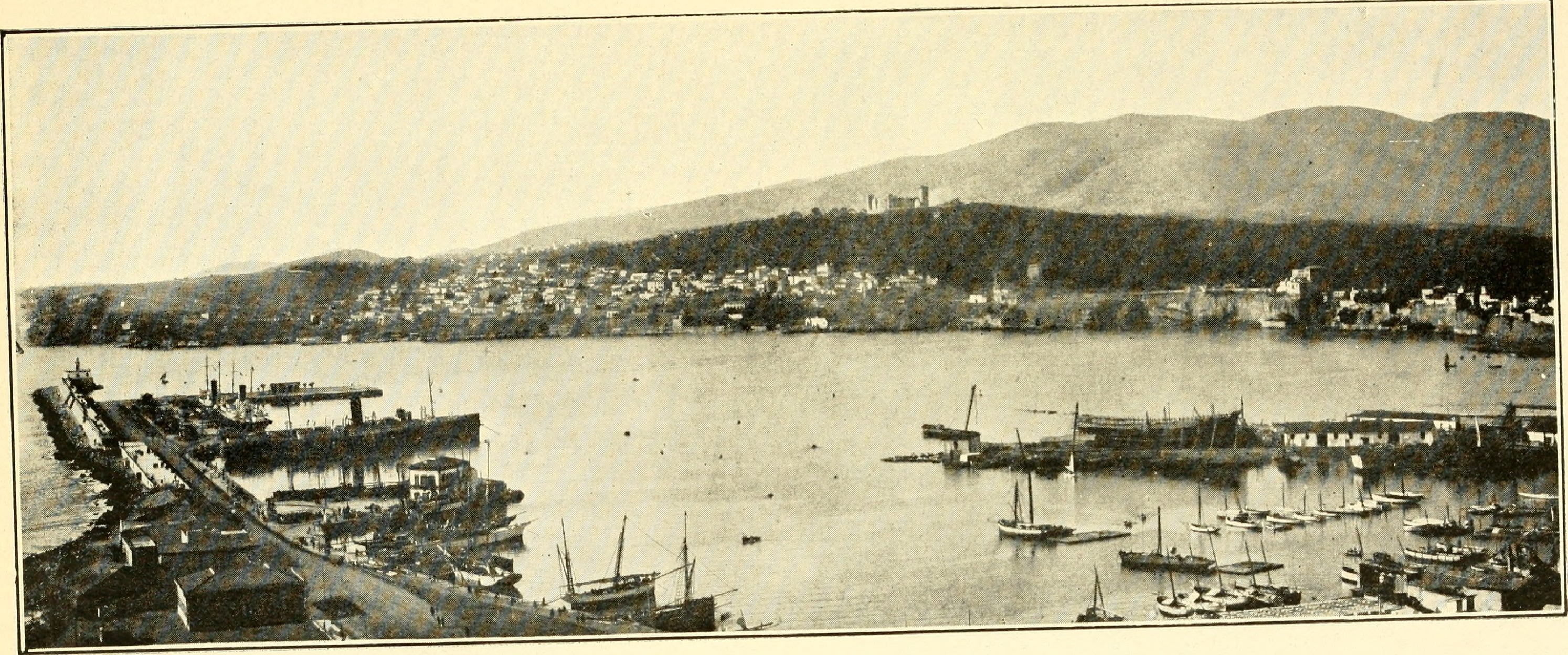
Palma de Mallorca, 1920s

Despite differences with the military, Llosas by no means could have been considered in opposition to Primo; his stance during tenure in Diputación Provincial and Mancomunitat should rather be viewed as efforts to find a compromise within framework of the regime. On good terms with the dictator, in May 1925 he was appointed civil governor of La Coruña province. Apart from standard administrative activities he again pursued a heavy-handed political line; aligned with the government, he cared little about the local opinion, though some refer to him as a pragmatist. Quoting health reasons and issuing an ambiguous farewell statement, he resigned in April 1926. The same year he was transferred to the parallel post in the Balearic Islands, commencing a second string in Palma. Little is known about his tenure. Press of the era provided only official information about cultural activities, diplomatic routine, construction of public utility establishments, propaganda, building new railway lines etc., though there were single complaints about his uncompromising stand recorded. Upon resignation of Primo in 1930 Llosas put himself at disposal of the new Berenguer government and was not re-appointed. He settled back in Olot, dedicating himself to family and business.

== Retiree: Republic and Francoism ==
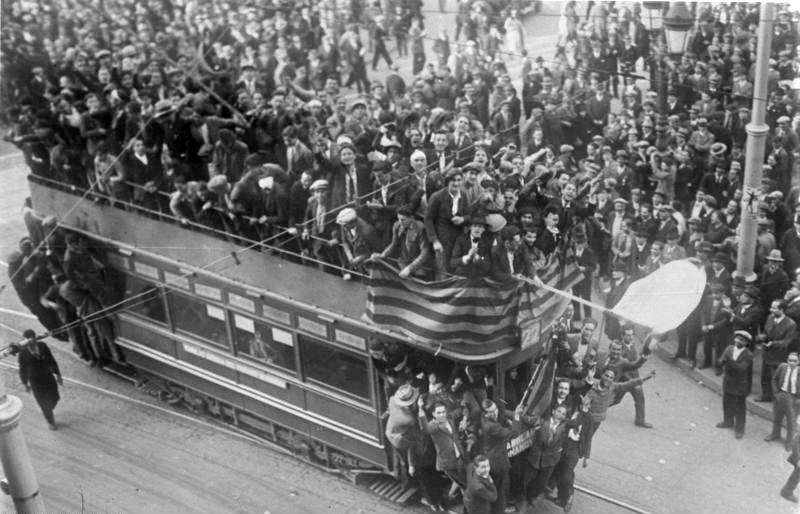
Catalonia: Republic declared, 1931

Llosas enjoyed excellent financial standing; apart from family properties, he held managerial posts in the Olot branch of Banco Hispano Americano, the giant which took over Banco Llosas Escubós in the mid-1920s; he was referred to as "banquer", "propietario", "comerciante" and "haciendista". He basked in prestige of key Girona politician, a charismatic figure and local patricio, his house continuously visited by applicants seeking support. Llosas’ position changed dramatically upon advent of the Republic: as a former dictatorship tycoon, a monarchist and a Traditionalist reactionary he found himself politically sidetracked. A street in Santa Pau, named after him in 1930, was immediately renamed to Via de la República in 1931.

Llosas focused on religious activity: in the early 1930s he took part in Catholic initiatives like Pro Ecclesia et Patria weeks, contributed to confessional periodicals and in 1933 led a large group of Catalans visiting Vatican. He resumed contacts with Carlism. During run-up to the 1933 electoral campaign he was initially reported as standing in candidatura de derecha agraría, neighboring with frontline Carlist activists like Urraca Pastor and defined as "tradicionalista"; eventually he declared the news not authorized. He kept supplying historical and religious articles to Traditionalist periodicals. In early 1936 Llosas together with other Catalan Carlists took part in broad monarchist gatherings led by Calvo Sotelo, though his relations with Carlism remained loose.

Llosas welcomed the coup of July 1936 though there is no information on him having been involved. Following the outbreak of hostilities Olot was overtaken by Republican militias, who raided estates belonging to individuals deemed sympathetic towards the Right; according to one version the Llosas’ Mas Quintana mansion in Santa Pau was ransacked, with all movable items robbed and the immovable ones destroyed; according to another, it was expropriated in an orderly manner. Though his age did not save from execution, he survived the outburst of revolutionary zeal. None of the sources consulted provides information on his whereabouts during the Civil War. Immediately following Nationalist seizure of Catalonia, in February 1939 Llosas rushed to offer his services to the new Presidente de la Diputación, March 1939 entrusted with gathering trade and industry managers of Girona province to proceed with the post-war reconstruction. However, apart from the very early months of Francoism in Catalonia he was no longer reported as engaged in any official activities.

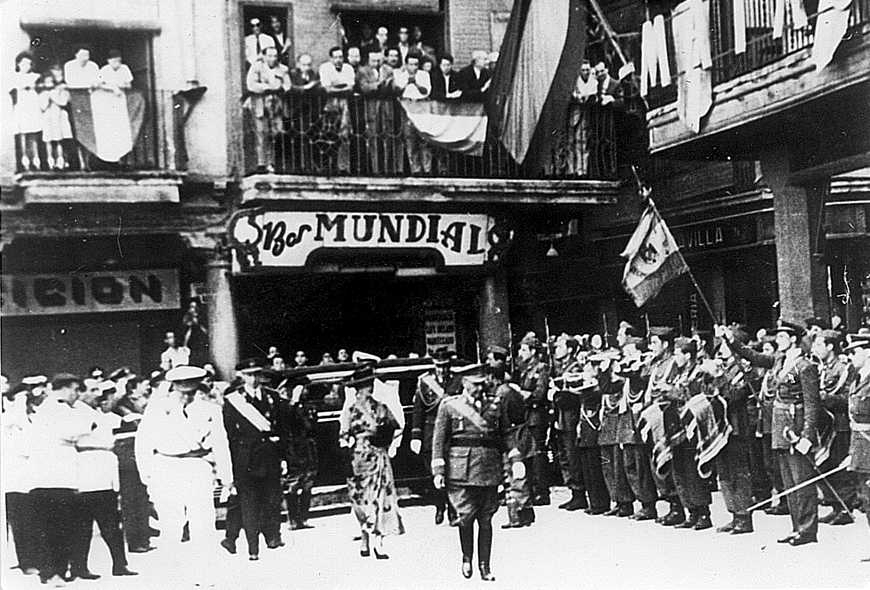
Francoism in Catalonia, 1940s

There is almost no information on Llosas’ public activity in the 1940s and later. Its key thread was engagement in numerous religious initiatives, reported as late as the early 1950s. Another was culture; apart from sporadic public appearances he was supplying historical pieces, usually related to religious topics, to the press, mostly to the Girona edition of ¡Arriba España!; the periodical referred to him as "respectable y querido amigo". In 1947 he became a great-grandfather, but since 1949 he remained seriously disabled. His funeral was attended by president of Diputación Provincial, alcalde of Olot, leaders of provincial Movimiento and representatives of Carlism. His obituary in ¡Arriba España! claimed he had always been a Traditionalist.

== See also ==
- Carlism
- Catalanism
- Marian Vayreda i Vila
- Solidaritat Catalana
- Assemblea de Parlamentaris
- Mancomunitat
