= Josep Clarà =

Catalan sculptor

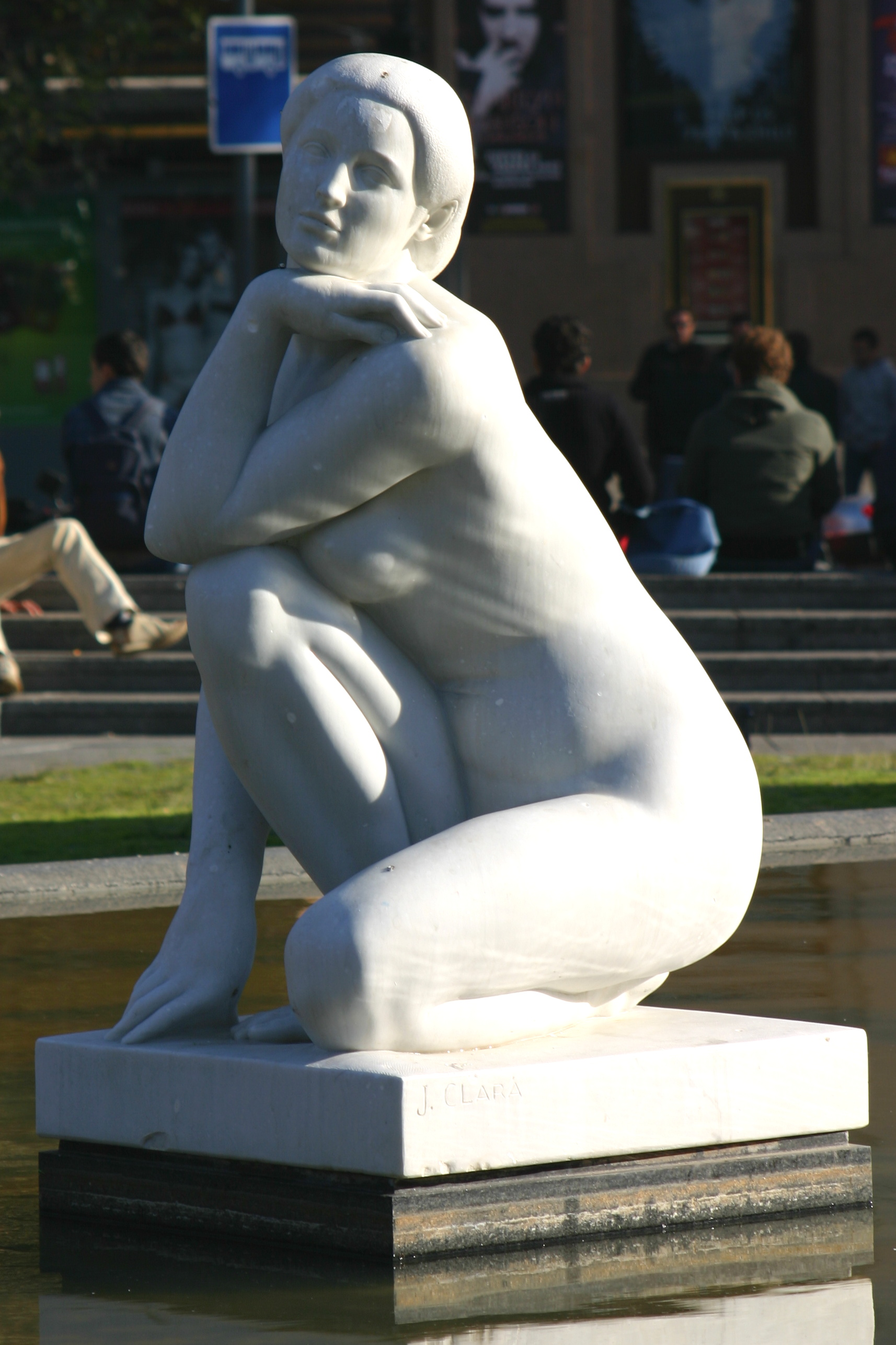
"La Deesa" in la Plaça Catalunya.

Josep Clarà i Ayats (16 December 1878 – 4 November 1958) was a Catalan sculptor from Spain. His work was part of the sculpture event in the art competition at the 1924 Summer Olympics.

== Biography ==
Clarà was born in Olot, Catalonia, Spain, in 1878. He attended the Olot School of Drawing (Escola de Dibuix d'Olot) with professor Josep Berga i Boix (1837–1914). During Clarà's time at the school, Joaquim Vayreda (1843–1894) highly praised one of Clarà's drawings; this greatly encouraged Clarà's artistic endeavors and was one of his happiest childhood memories. In 1897, Clarà enrolled in the School of Fine Arts in Toulouse, France. He moved to Paris in 1890, where he met Auguste Rodin, which caused him to pursue sculpture. He also became close friends with sculptor Arístides Maillol. He was a student of Louis-Ernest Barrias. His sketches of dancer Isadora Duncan's distinct movements stand out among Clarà's work. After Duncan's death in 1927, Antonia Mercé instead served as Clarà's model. Clarà's training was capped off with travels to London and Italy.

He returned to Paris, where he distinguished himself as a sculptor. A part of "mediterraneísmo", his work was figurative, solid, and compact. He put on numerous exhibitions of his work in Paris, London, Berlin, and Barcelona. In 1932, he moved permanently to Barcelona. There, he continued working and exhibiting until his death on 4 November 1958. His last sculpture was "Estàtica" (1954–1958).

Most of his works are now held by the Museu de la Garrotxa in Olot and by the Museu Nacional d'Art de Catalunya in Barcelona. Other works are held by the Pompidou Centre (Paris), Museo Nacional de Bellas Artes (Santiago de Chile, Chile), Museo Nacional de Bellas Artes (Buenos Aires, Argentina), Museo Nacional de Bellas Artes (Havana, Cuba), Musée des Augustins (Toulouse, France), and the Museo Nacional Centro de Arte Reina Sofía (Madrid). His sculpture, Serenity is located in Meridian Hill Park in Washington, D.C.

== See also ==
- Sculptures in Plaça de Catalunya
