= Miguel Blay =

Spanish sculptor

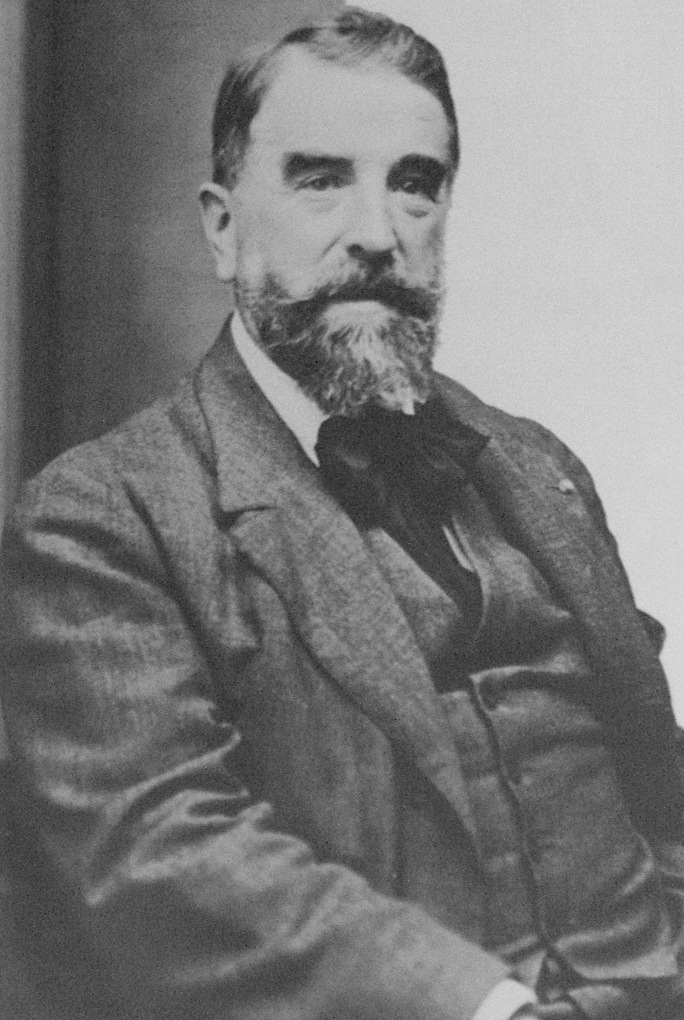
- Born: Miguel Blay y Fàbregas; 8 October 1866; Olot, Spain
- Died: 22 January 1936 (aged 69); Madrid, Spain
- Known for: Sculptor
- Movement: Modernisme

Miguel Blay y Fàbregas (in Catalan, Miquel Blay i Fàbregas) (8 October 1866 – 22 January 1936) was a Spanish sculptor.

== Biography ==
Blay was born in the city of Olot, in the province of Girona to a humble family. He begins his formal education in the Municipal Drawing School and the studio of El Arte Cristiano where he was a disciple of Josep Berga i Boix and the painter Joaquim Vayreda. In the studio of El Arte Cristiano he drew and painted various Christian pieces. At the end of 1888, he received a grant from the provincial government of Girona to study in Paris.

In Paris he studied at Ecole des beaux-arts and at the Academie Julian under the sculptor Henri Chapu, whom Blay credited with having a large influence on his sculpture. Blay left Paris for a few months to study in Rome and return to Olot. In 1889 he won a gold medal in the Universal Exhibition in Paris and the following year was named knight of the French Legion of Honor. In 1892, Blay competed in the National Exposition of Fine Arts and won first prize for his work Los Primeros Fríos. The piece was also awarded a gold medal in Barcelona in 1894.

In 1906 Blay moved to Madrid, the city in which he resided until his death. In 1908, he won the medal of honor at the National Exhibition of Fine Arts in Madrid for his work Eclosion, for which he had won a great diploma of honor in Barcelona the year before. In 1909 he was selected as member of the Real Academia de Bellas Artes de San Fernando. From this year on, he was a professor at the Special School of Fine Arts in Madrid. From 1925 to 1932 he became the director of the Academy of Fine Art in Rome.

Blay died in Madrid on 22 January 1936 seven days after a stroke.

== Notable works ==
Los Primeros Fríos:

There are two versions of this piece, one in marble and one in bronze. The marble version can be found at the MNAC in Barcelona, and also at the botanical garden in Buenos Aires, while a bronze version can be found at the Museo Regional de la Garrocha, in Olot. The two versions mark two different periods of his sculpture. The marble version is idealistic, focusing on the contrast in detail between the wrinkled skin of the old man and the smooth, tight skin of the young girl. The bronze version is more influenced by the works of Rodin, and is a synthesis of realism as well as the emotion evoked by the two characters. Its modernist technique influenced an entire generation of Catalan sculptors.

La Canción Popular Catalana:

In 1905, Blay was approached by Modernist architect Lluís Domènech i Montaner to create a group of sculptures for the facade of the Palau de la Musica Catalana, a concert hall in Barcelona. The building is known for its Art Nouveau style and is made up of a mix of glass, metalwork, sculpture, and ceramic mosaics. Miguel Blay created a group of sculptures titled “La canción popular catalana” (The Catalan Folk Song) for the facade of the building. The sculptures depict different characters of varying social classes: children, peasants, sailors, etc. In the center, there is a female figure that represents the Catalan song. Above her the patron saint of Barcelona, Sant Jordi, stands holding a sword, protecting her and the other sculptures. It is said to show that people of all classes can enjoy the traditional Catalan music.

Monument to Romanones

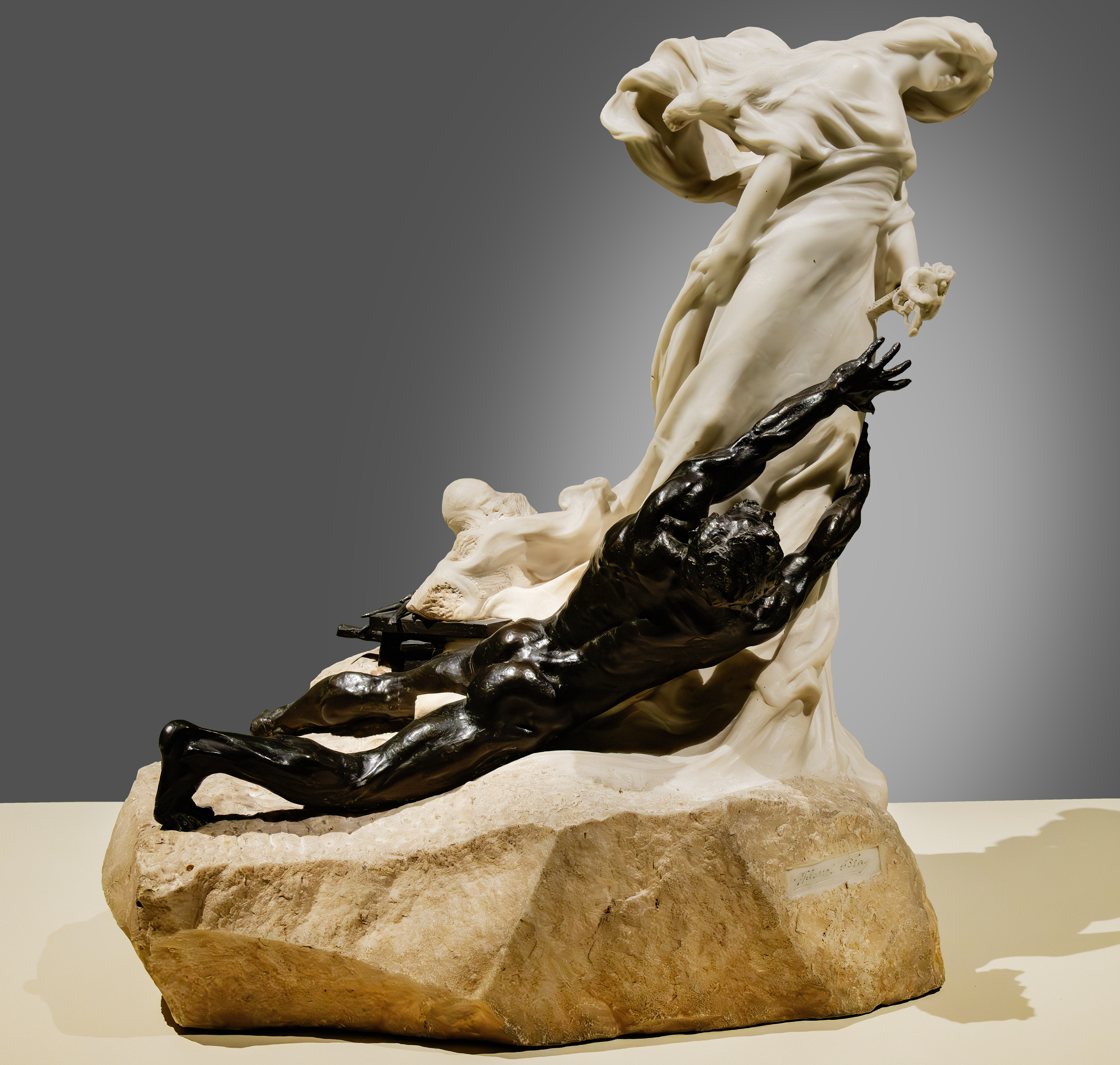
Pursue the dream MNAC

Dona i flors (Woman and flowers) MNAC

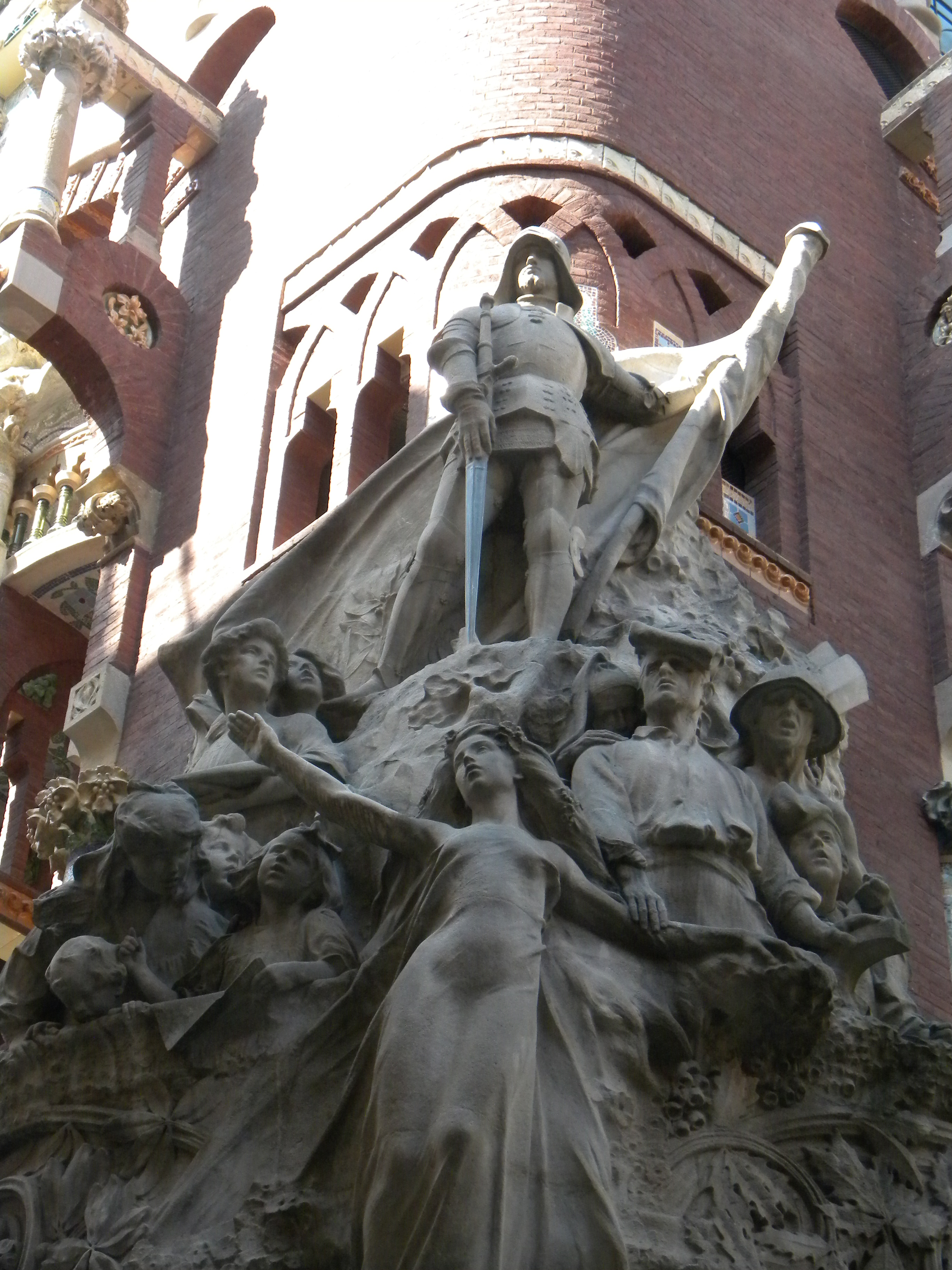
La Canción Popular Catalana

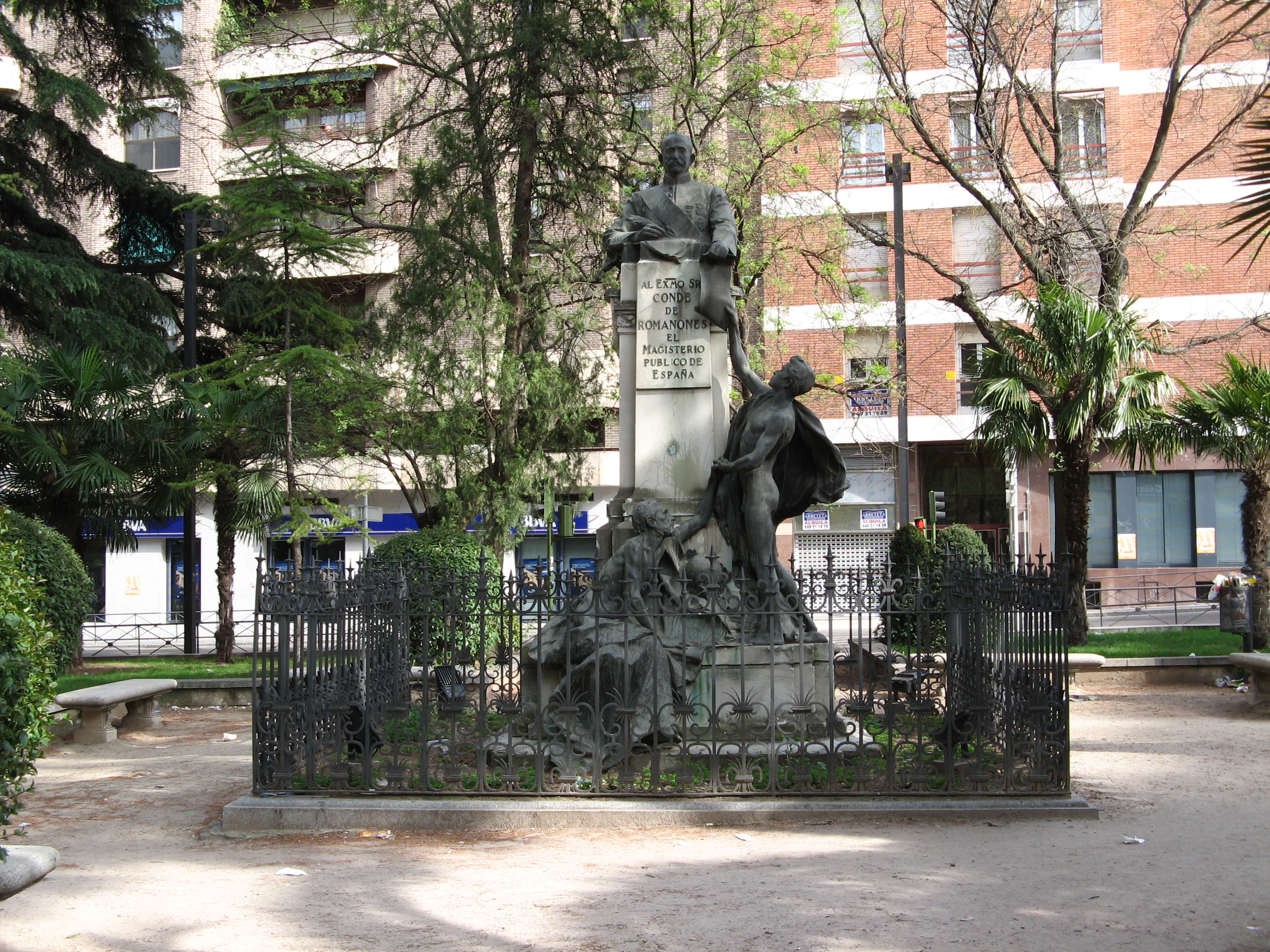
The Monument to Romanones

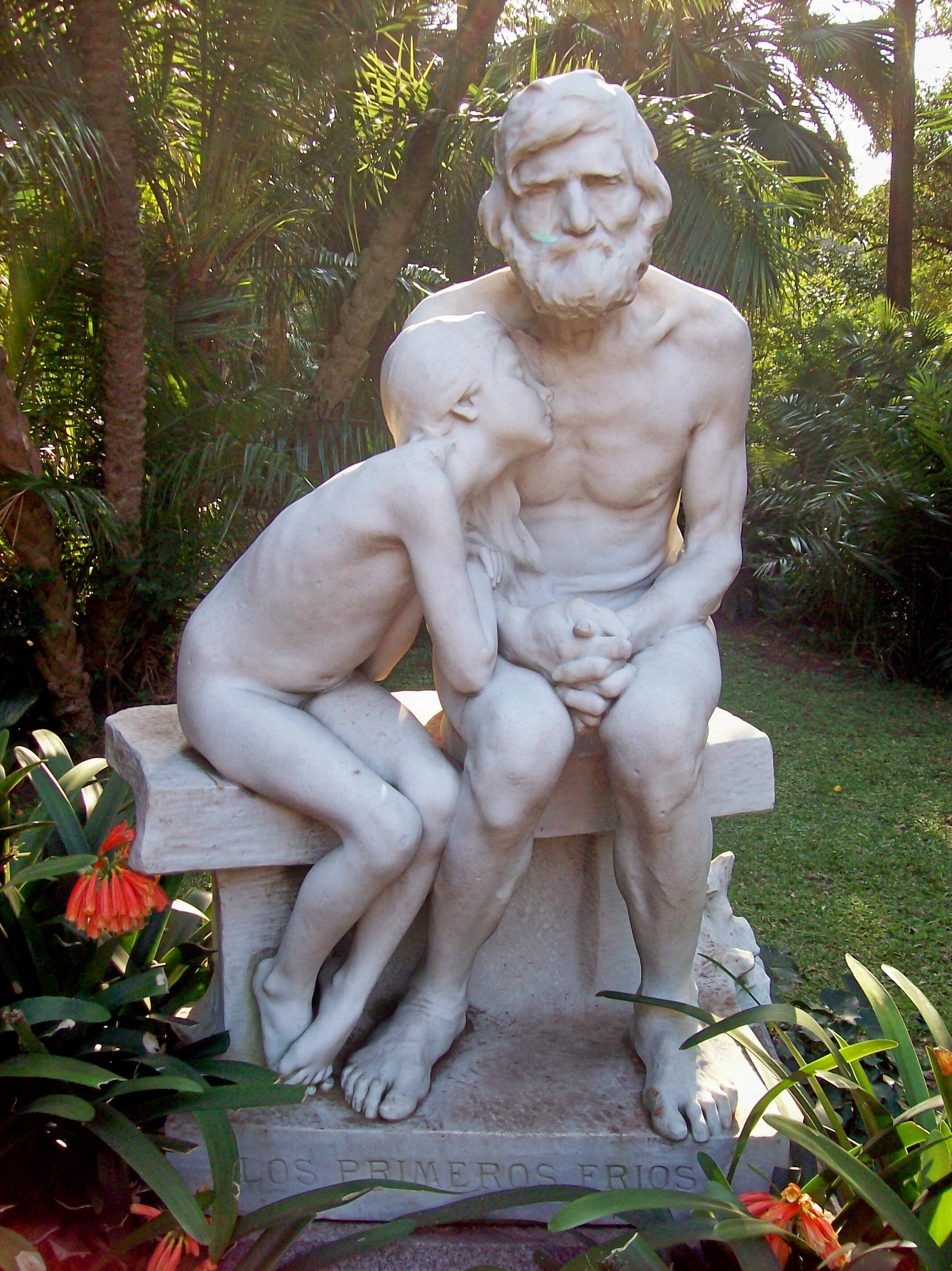
Los Primeros Fríos
(The First Cold)

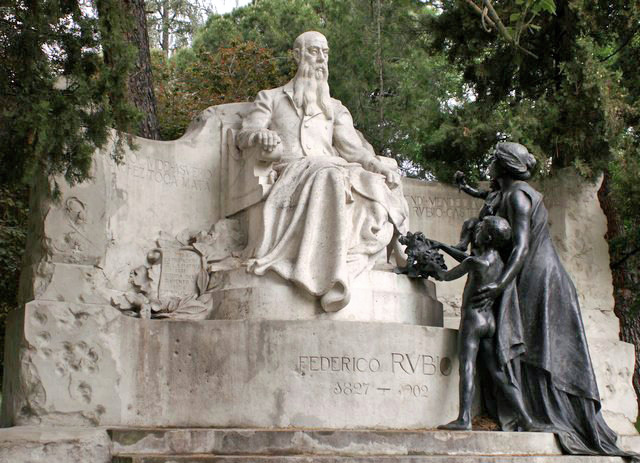
The Monument to Doctor Federico Rubio
