= Olot school =

Catalan painting movement

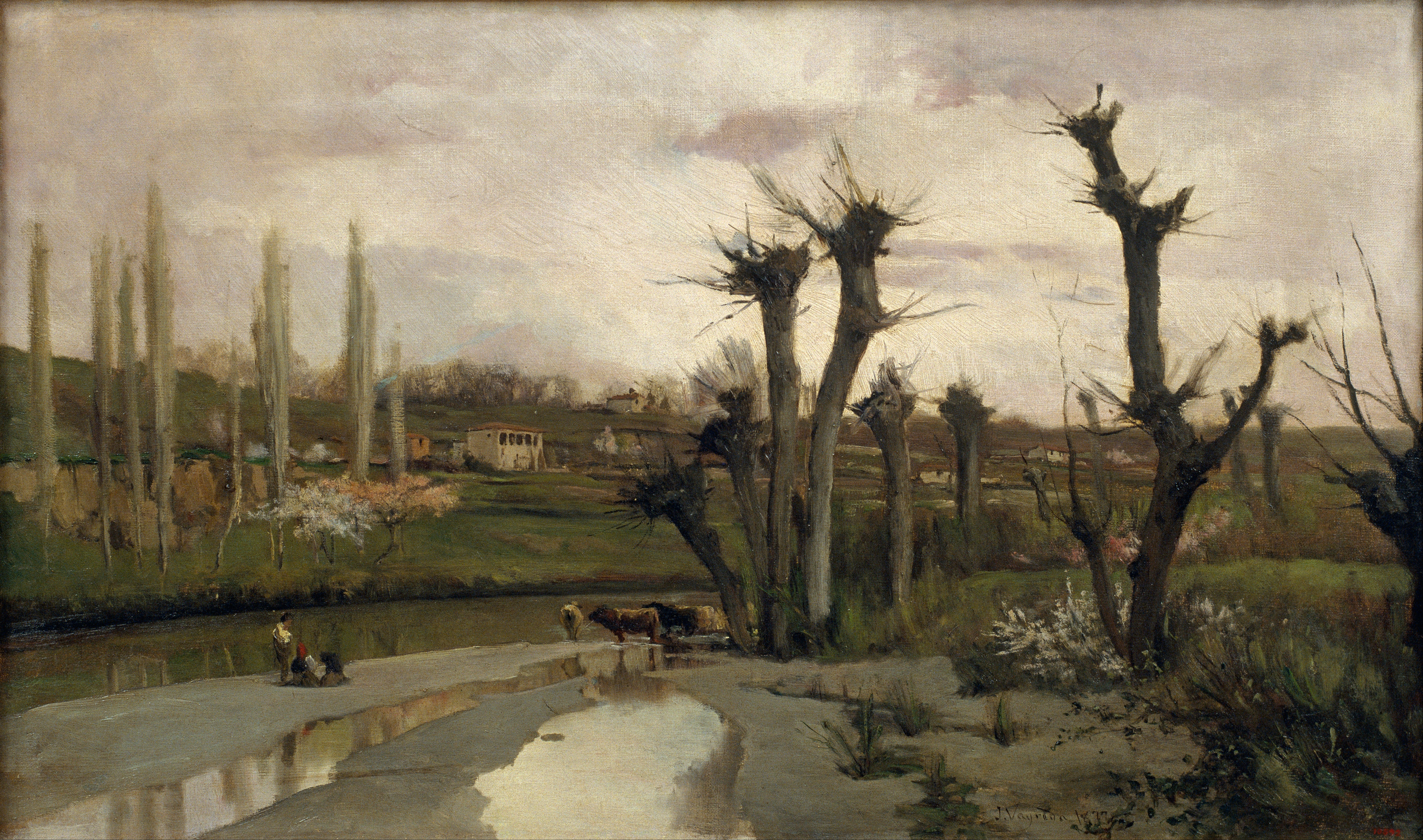
The Beginning of Spring, by Joaquim Vayreda

The Olot school of landscape painting is a group of painters that created an artistic style in the second half of the 19th century. It includes not simply artists from Olot (in Catalonia, Spain), but all artists whose artworks were inspired by the countryside of Olot. By extension, artists connected with Olot and its comarca, Garrotxa.

== History ==
In Catalonia, the proliferation of painting coincided with the Restoration, a period marked by economic prosperity that favored the bourgeoisie which was the motor of the cultural renaissance of Catalan nationalism. This bourgeoisie had considerable influence in the arts; it sought art that was realistic, but simultaneously pleasing, elegant, and optimistic, and preferred painting over other artistic disciplines. During this period, several schools of art began and were consolidated, among them the Olot school.

The Olot school of landscape painting is similar to the Barbizon school. It was formed by Joaquim and Marian Vayreda with the assistance of Ramón Martí Alsina. From this tradition emerged a new artistic concept: creating multiple versions of the Olot countryside, where the treatment of light and chromatic variations were important elements. The Olot school used the countryside of Garrotxa as a source of inspiration for their work, but with stylistic freedom. Vayreda's paintings attracted the attention of artists including Laureà Barrau, Enric Galwey, Joan Brull, Lluís Masriera, Modest Urgell, Ramon Casas, and Santiago Rusiñol, who went to Olot and also painted depictions of the countryside.

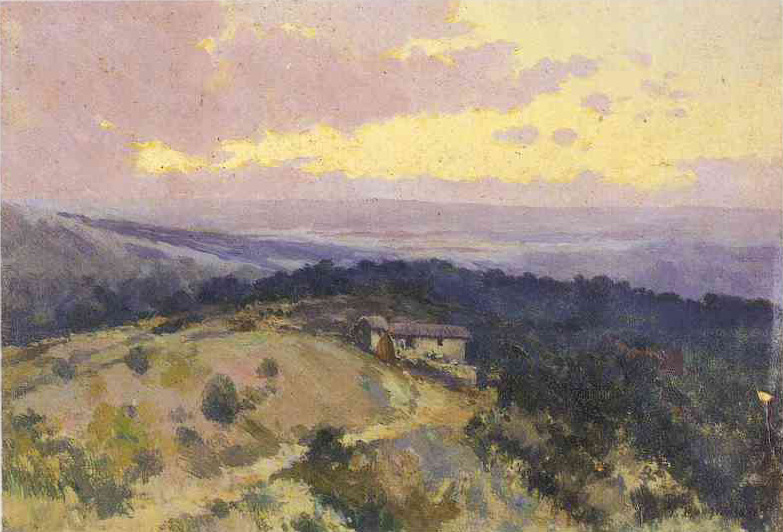
Red Sky, by Josep Berga i Boix

The Olot school was supported by the founding of the Olot Art School (Escola d'Art d'Olot) in 1783 by bishop Tomás de Lorenzana, and also by the creation of workshops dedicated to the reproduction of religious images. The first workshop that was dedicated to this work, "El Arte Cristiano", was founded in 1880. The industry of religious image making expanded considerably starting around 1900 in Olot, and became an important part of the city's economy. Today, the old Arte Cristiano factory has been converted into the Museum of the Saints (Museo de los Santos).

The Olot school was institutionalized by painter Josep Berga i Boix, who served as director of the Olot Artistic and Cultural Center (Centre Artístic-Cultural d'Olot) (founded by Vayreda) in 1869 and later as director of the Public School of Drawing (Escola Pública de Dibuix) from 1877 to 1914. Annual exhibitions were organized first by the Artistic and Cultural Center and then by other entities.

Numerous other artists later continued the traditions of the Olot school, often training at the Public School of Drawing (called the Escola de Belles Arts i Oficis starting in 1939) under the direction of Ivó Pascual, Martí Casadevall, Bartomeu Mas y Collellmir, and Joan Vilà i Moncau. Other artists belonging to the movement include Josep Berga i Boada, Josep Clarà, Melcior Domenge, and Josep Pinós.

== The Olot school today ==
The Drawing Festival (Fira del Dibuix) is celebrated annually in Olot on the Day of Sant Lluc. This festival brings together many artists that sell their works directly to the public. The festival was conceived particularly for the sale of works on paper, such as sketches, but recently it has been possible to find artworks in many media.

Since the 2003–2004 academic year, the Olot Art School (Escola d'Art d'Olot) has been called the Superior School of Art and Design (Escola d'Art i Superior de Disseny), adding a degree in interior design; a graphic design degree was added in 2007–2008. Today, there are more than 400 students enrolled, particularly from the neighboring comarcas.

Today, the term "Olot school"—or particularly the term "Olot school of landscape painting" ("escuela paisajística de Olot" or "escola paisatgística d'Olot")--is not well-accepted, because not all artists connected with Olot paint landscapes, and not all the artists connected with the school work or live in the city of Olot.
