= Josep Berga i Boix =

Spanish painter

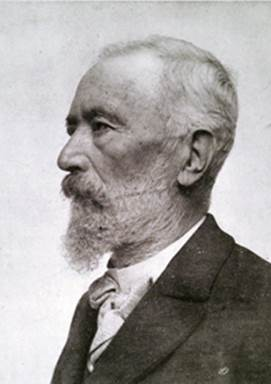
Josep Berga I Boix (1900s)

Josep Berga i Boix (25 October 1837, La Pinya, Garrotxa - 8 October 1914, Olot) was a Spanish landscape painter; influenced by the Barbizon school and one of the founders of the Olot school. In his later years he was known as Avi Berga (Grandpa Berga).

== Biography ==
He was born to a family of peasant laborers. His early education came from two local monks and his first exposure to art probably came at the farmhouse owned by his parents' employer. The only way open to continue his education was by pursuing an ecclesiastical career so, in 1852, he went to Olot to attend the Latin school. While there, he was able to study drawing with a local artist named Narcís Pascual i Sala (1805-1869).

In 1855, he moved to Girona to continue his religious training at the seminary. He was there for six years without making a definite decision about entering the clergy. Along with his official studies, he took private lessons from Alfons Gelabert Buxó, who had studied with Thomas Couture in Paris. When he left the seminary, he found work as a draftsman for the architect, Martí Sureda.

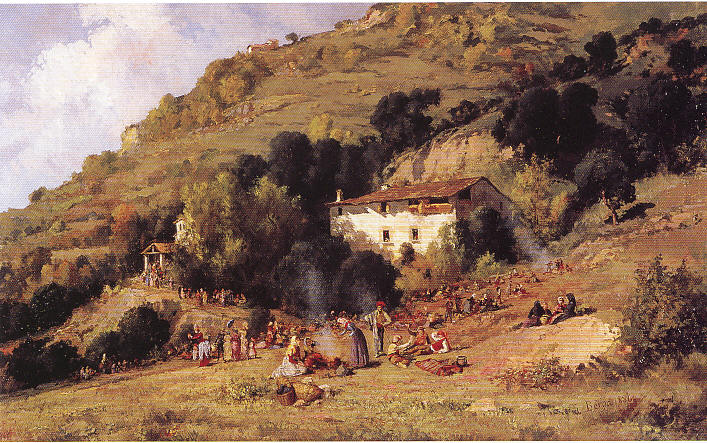
The Romeria (1886)

He became a regular contributor of illustrations for various periodicals, including Catalunya Artística. As a result of some work he did for a Carlist newspaper, he was briefly forced to take refuge in Perpignan after the Revolution of 1868, where he met Joaquim Vayreda and was introduced to the Barbizon school of landscape painting. He also took this occasion to make sketches in the Pyrenees. Upon his return, he applied to be Director at the Drawing School of Olot, but was unsuccessful. He settled there, however, and worked with Vayreda to create a local style of painting, which showed the influence of Barbizon as well as the Norwich school.

During the Third Carlist War, he had to go to France temporarily again. In 1877, he was finally named Director of the drawing school; a position that occupied most of his energies for the rest of his life. Among his best-known students there were Josep Clarà and Miquel Blay i Fàbregas. In 1880, together with Vayreda and others, he created a special workshop for religious images; "Els Sants d'Olot", which gained an international reputation. Berga later quit in frustration over being unable to change the public's "bad taste" in regards to those types of images.

He was also an amateur writer. From 1893 to 1894, his semi-autobiographical narrative, "L'estudiant de la Garrotxa", was published as a serial in La Ilustració Catalana. This was issued as a book in 1895, with illustrations by several artists from Olot. He later produced a sequel, a study of art in Olot, a play ("La Borda", 1902) and, towards the end of his life, a collection of stories; Llegendes de la comarca d'Olot.

In 2000, the Olot Town Council added his portrait to the "Gallery of Illustrious Olotinos".

== Selected paintings ==
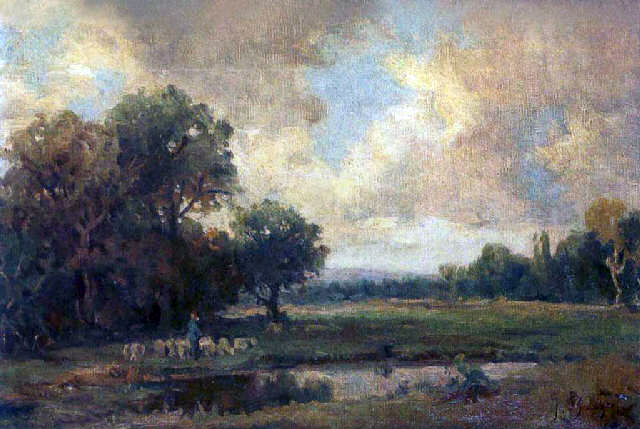
Landscape with
Shepherd and Flock

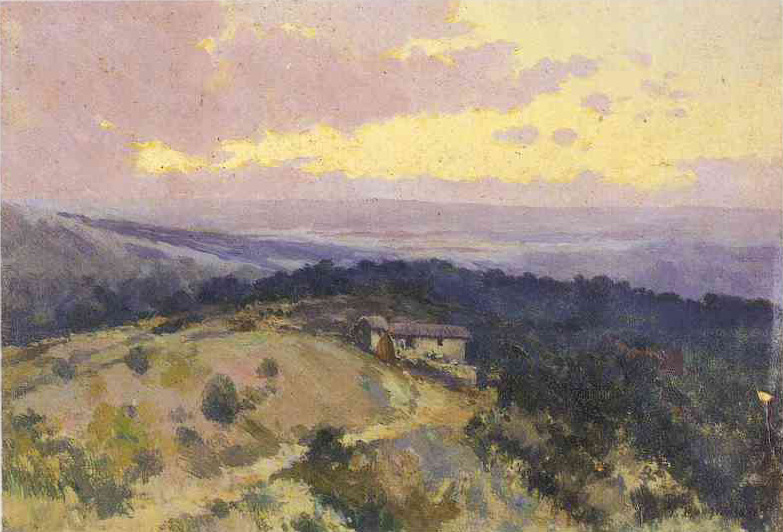
Red Sky

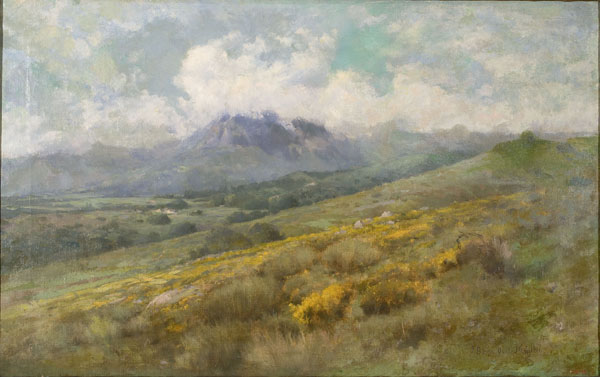
Untitled landscape

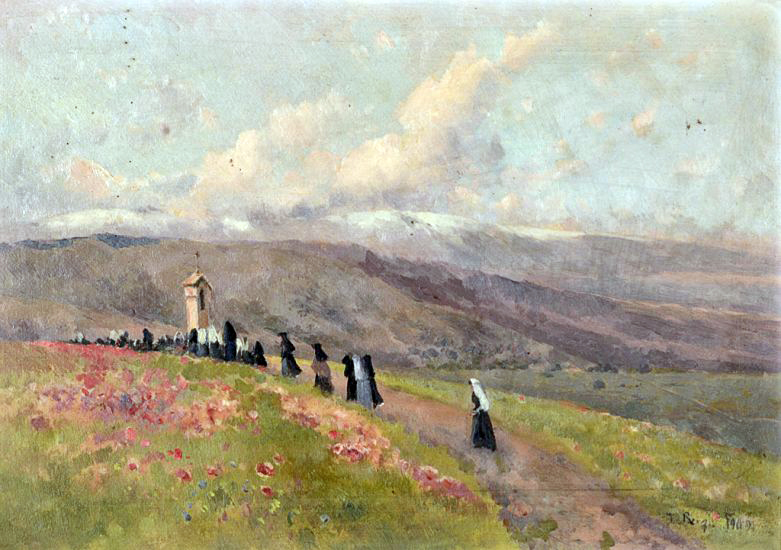
Procession
