= Marian Vayreda i Vila =

Catalan writer, soldier and activist

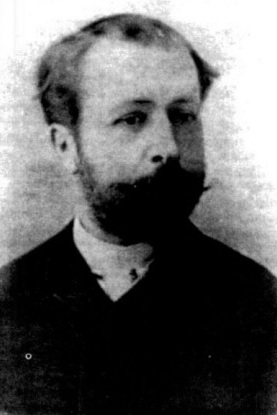
- Born: Marian Vayreda i Vila; 1853; Olot
- Died: 1903 (aged 49–50); Olot
- Occupations: Painter, writer
- Known for: his novels
- Political party: Carlism, Catalanism

Marian Vayreda i Vila (1853–1903) was a Carlist soldier and activist, a painter and a Catalan writer. He is recognized as key representative of Catalan cultural renaissance of the late 19th century. He is particularly acknowledged for his 1904 novel, La Punyalada, declared one of the best Catalan literary works of all time. Politically Vayreda is considered a typical case of an identity located in-between Carlism and emerging Spain's peripheral nationalisms.

== Family and youth ==
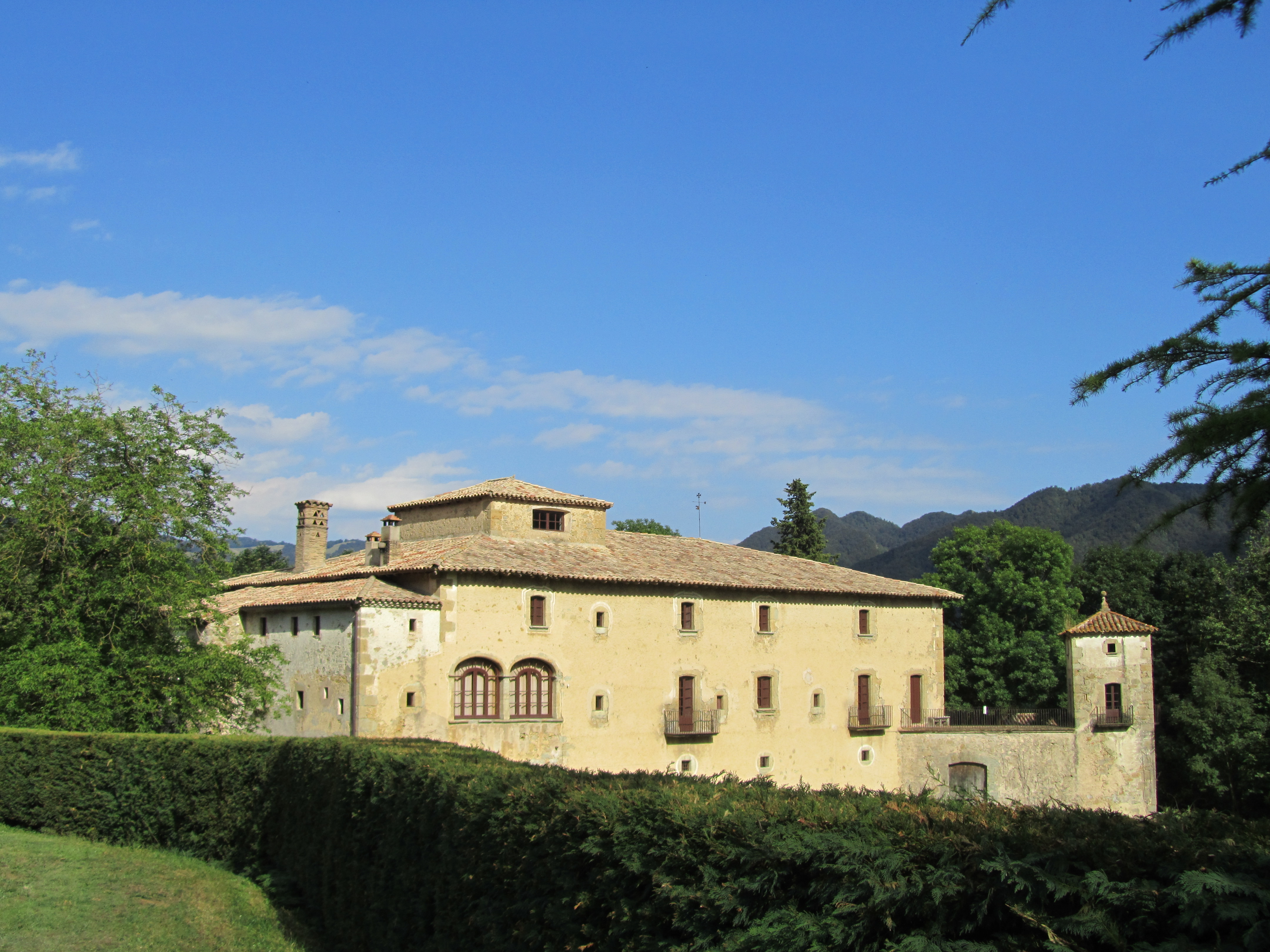
Cavaller de Vidrà estate

Marian Francesc Bartomeu Vayreda i Vila was descendant to noble Catalan families. His paternal ancestors were related to the Alt Garrotxa town of Olot. During the legitimist siege in course of the First Carlist War the family house was set ablaze, which forced Marian's grandfather Francesc to move to Girona. It is there that his son and Marian's father, Francesc Vayreda i Busquets (1814–1870), fell in love with Maria Rosa Vila i Galí (1817–?). She was descendant to a far more prestigious local Vila Cavaller family, holding a number of estates and owning Cavaller de Vidrà, an iconic Catalan mansion.

The couple married in 1840 and in 1844 they settled in the reconstructed family house in Olot. Francesc's maternal uncle was municipal military commander and Francesc possibly took part in activities against the local trabucaires. He inherited estates co-possessed with his relatives and is referred to as "propietario rentista". As the two families maintained good relations, Francesc temporarily administered Porqueres holdings of his junior Vila nephews and the Vila family periodically managed the Vayreda estates. Francesc and Maria Rosa had 6 children, three of them becoming recognized figures. Apart from Marian, Joaquím (1843–1894) made his name as a painter and Estanislau (1848–1901) as a botanic.

As a child Marían spent much of his time at the Cavaller de Vidrà estate, later frequenting the Olot Padres Escolapios college; following bachillerato he intended to study law in Barcelona. The advent of Glorious Revolution of 1868 changed these plans and Marían settled for studying art in l'Escola de Dibuix d'Olot. Around 1870 he joined the Carlist conspiracy and at the outbreak of the Third Carlist War he entered the legitimist troops. His exact war record is not clear. Most sources agree he remained on the Catalan Front; some claim he formed part of General Staff of Francesc Savalls, not unlikely as his headquarters was in Cavaller de Vidrà. Other sources note that Vayreda took part in combat, especially in the battles of d’Argelaguer and Prats de Lluçanés, and was wounded in action. Shortly before defeat and disguised as a peasant he made it to France.

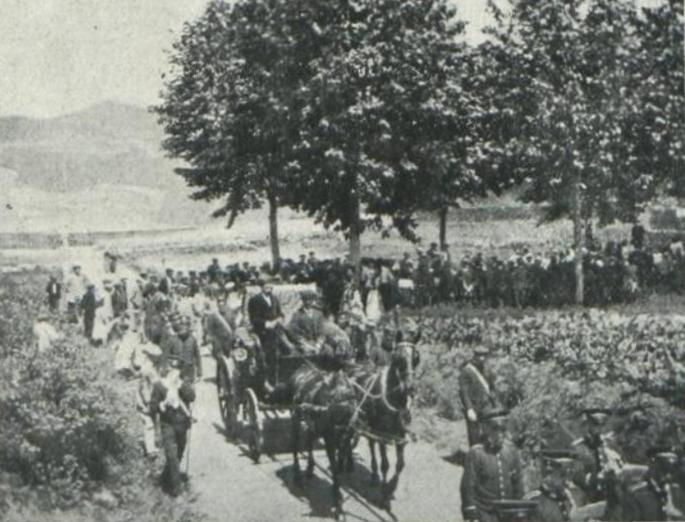
homage to Joaquim Vayreda, 1912

After a brief period in Séte Vayreda studied painting in Paris, for 2 years frequenting the classes of Jean-Léon Gérôme. Following the amnesty he returned to Spain and went on with art studies in l'Escola de Belles Arts in Barcelona. In 1878 he settled back in Olot, co-founding El Arte Cristiano, a commercially successful workshop producing religious imagery. In 1883 Vayreda married a geronina, Pilar Aulet Soler (1871–1928). The couple remained in the multi-family house in Olot; in his mature years Vayreda was referred to as patricio, gran señor, a formal and serious man. Marian and Pilar had 7 children. The best known of them, Joaquím, was a Traditionalist writer, journalist and local councilor though he made his name mostly as an art critic; also other children were active in Traditionalism. His grandson tried his hand in painting. Montserrat Vayreda was granddaughter of his brother.

== In and around Carlism ==
Third Carlist War by Vayreda

Political preferences of Vayreda's father remain unclear, but his maternal ancestors were firmly conservative and Carlist for already three generations. Growing up in their Cavaller de Vidrà estate Marían was absorbing its Traditionalist rituals. Since 15 years of age he was already a regular subscriber of the Madrid-based La Esperanza, the neo-Catholic daily of an increasingly Carlist leaning; he also admitted juvenile fascination with earlier conservative political writings of Jaime Balmes. Vayreda's enthusiastic teenage access to legitimist troops during the Third Carlist War came naturally, though some scholars claim that when reconstructing his motives 30 years later, instead of religious or conservative threads he rather pointed to Carlist defense of the furs and its doctrina regionalista. Almost all authors dealing with his literary works underline that Marian was enormously affected by the wartime experience, though none of the sources consulted clarifies what the nature of that impact was in terms of his political outlook. Chaos and conflict in Carlist ranks, brutality of civil warfare and bitterness of defeat have certainly deprived Vayreda of his juvenile zeal.

In the early 1880s Carlism in Catalonia, like elsewhere in the country, remained in crisis, its outposts initially inactive and later painfully reconstructed. Nothing is known about Vayreda's engagement in re-emerging party structures following his return from exile; until the late 1880s there is no information about him either joining official party ranks or taking part in Carlist-sponsored initiatives. He re-approached the local Olot Circulo Tradicionalista by the end of the decade and joined it formally in 1895. Moreover, he entered local executive bodies, the same year becoming member of the comarcal Junta Tradicionalista. According to his later ex-post declarations, the access did not result from attachment to Carlist dynastical claims; facilitated by traditionalist and religious outlook, it was intended primarily to reinforce the regionalist threads within the movement.

Carlist standard

According to his contemporary Olot politicians Vayreda aspired to local party leadership, but experience in its structures did not last long. His bid to format local Carlist political profile principally along regionalist lines failed. It was possibly thwarted by provincial authorities, as Vayreda lambasted them for ignoring regionalist fundaments of the Traditionalist program; moreover, he complained about political course incompatible with the spirit of the movement, smelling of "liberalism and authoritarianism". In 1896 he formally left Circulo Tradicionalista. During last years of his life Vayreda's links with Carlism were lukewarm. When publishing his short literary pieces he preferred not to co-operate with Carlist periodicals. His political relations boiled down to occasional co-operation during electoral campaigns; actually, Olot remained the most Carlist electoral district in Catalonia. Above all, he contributed to the cause in his Carlism-flavored works, inducing some to call him "prohom de la causa".

== In and around Catalanism ==
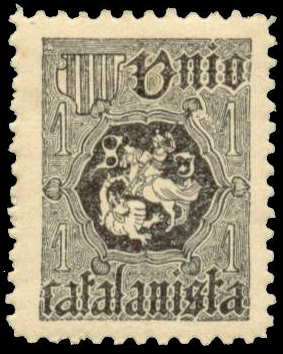
Unio Catalanista stamp

Vayreda explained his juvenile access to Carlism as motivated principally by its defense of traditional regional establishments and by its regionalist spirit, though scholars note that those ex-post declarations might have been burdened by backward extrapolation of his mature views and by his mitigating intentions. It seems indisputable, however, that following the war his Carlism was getting watered down. Remaining within Traditionalist and Catholic framework, Vayreda's outlook was increasingly focused on regional identity and in the 1880s it was self-identified as "traditionalist regionalism".

Though by no means natural, inevitable or typical, Vayreda's shift from orthodox Carlist ideario to particular emphasis on only one of its components – regional identity – is considered representative for a group of Traditionalist militants from different parts of Spain. In the post-war years it was possibly influenced by "ideologia de la muntanya" of Torras i Bages, but assumed particular dynamics in the late 1880s, during campaign against the new Civil Code. In Olot it brought together people of different leanings, jointly with Vayreda forming the local Centre Catalanista and issuing its periodical, El Olotense (later l’Oloti); Vayreda kept supporting the periodical throughout the 1890s. By the end of the decade he approached Unió Catalanista, though he is not known to have participated in its political endeavors.

Vayreda's Catalan identity was heavily entrenched in conservative, Traditionalist, Catholic and anti-modern sense of regional self. It did not stretch to embrace any sense of ethnic or national community. This identity was expressed almost exclusively in cultural terms and nothing is known of his support for Catalan political ambitions, autonomy-centered or otherwise; he was also cautious to distance himself from Catalanism flavored by federal or republican ideas. His vision of Catalonia was that of a spiritual entity epitomized by muntanya, the vision coined by Balmes, rejuvenated by Torres i Bages and sang in poetry by Verdaguer. Vayreda's death was painfully acknowledged by Unió Catalanista, Lliga de Catalunya, Lliga Regional and Foment Catalanista.

Catalan standard

According to dedicated studies of Vayreda's political outlook he remained on intersection between Carlism and Catalanism; some authors agree by maintaining that in mature years he settled for a possibilist compromise between the two. Other scholars clam that he opted for "Catalunya clarament carlina", declare that his Catalanism was recycled Carlism, suggest that he left Carlism to join regionalism, identify him as conservative regionalist absorbed by Catalanism or simply as moderate Catalanist (unconscious Catalanist,) with no mention of Carlism at all. Those unwilling to dwell whether his Catalanism was enveloped in Carlism or whether it was rather the latter embedded in regional self settled for his late auto-definition of "tradicionalista regionalista".

== Painter ==
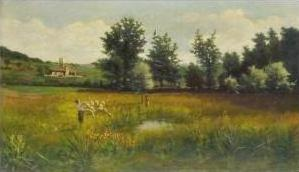
Paisaje de Olot

Vayreda kept painting through all of his adult life, though some scholars claim that in the mid-1890s he was gradually turning towards literature, either due to lack of public recognition or following death of his brother. His first picture discussed in literature is dated 1876, the last one 1901; total number of his works is unclear and it probably amounts (including sketches and unfinished ones) to few hundred. Most of them are small and very small compositions bordering sketches, though his best known paintings are significant in size. His ultimate technique was oil on canvas; minor works could be also charcoal or oil on cardboard; the peculiarity of his method was preference for a studio instead of plein air; he composed paintings on basis of previous sketches and minor works.

Vayreda is typically identified as a landscape painter or as a costumbrista, though his works fall into four major topic categories: landscapes, religion, history and customs, often combining some if not all of the above. Landscapes are deeply set in the hilly Alt Garrotxa ambience, presenting local rural countryside with meticulous and accurate description. Featuring sunlighted sorted fields and wooded mountains they avoid any sign of decay or derangement. Despite what is described as their realism, they deliver impression of perfect natural order; due to neat and clean landscape contemporaries compared them to Japanese drawings. Some value his landscapes higher than those of his brother Joaquím, others deem them inferior. In a number of paintings landscape is the setting for local rural scenes, always scrupulously implanted in local customs and never containing a tiny hint of discord.

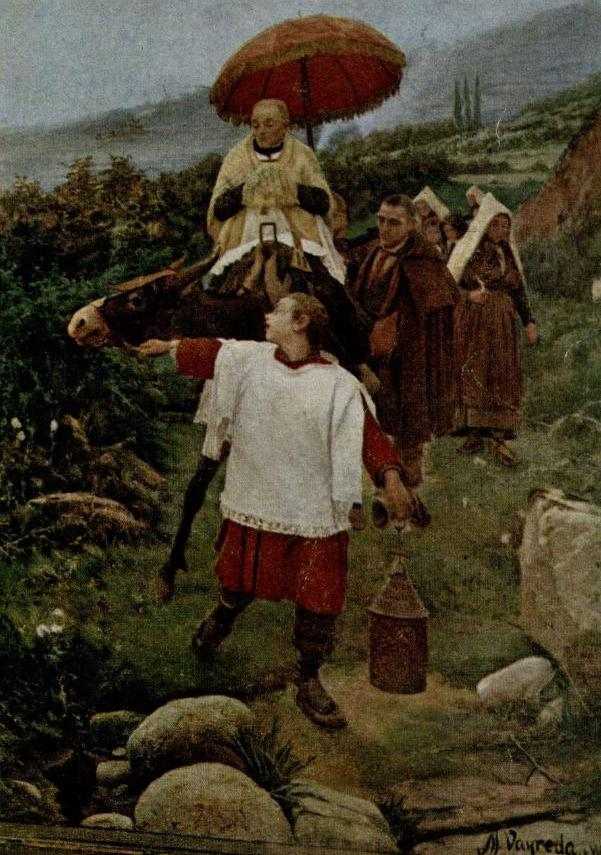
El combregar a muntanya (Viático)

Religious and historical scenes are often presented in medieval architectural setting, usually also related to Alt Garrotxa; it is reproduced with competent attention to detail, though at times also with some creativity. Historical paintings, tending to be academic in style, often reveal a sophisticated factual context; they tend to focus on medieval history of Spain, however initially Vayreda painted works also related to the Third Carlist War. Religious works, usually designed for private use or for local sanctuaries, reveal references – at times bordering quotations – to Italian Quattrocento; contemporaries valued them for color and chiaroscuro refinement, today they are appreciated for composition and context.

Vayreda is considered member of the Olot School. Far more than esthetic group emphasizing architectural patrimony, studying folklore or celebrating beauty of rural nature, the Olot painters shared the same holistic vision and messianic understanding of art, intended to regenerate the society. Some scholars claim it stemmed directly from Carlism and was its continuation by means of brush and paint. Others see it as an attempt of conservative re-Catalanisation. Most agree that its central theme, embodied in a number of symbolic representations, was traditionalist vision of the region, confronting threatening modernity by means of re-vindicating earth, religion and history. In terms of artistic heritage, Vayreda and l’Escola d’Olot are considered related to vigatanisme, the Barbizon school, the Nazarenes, the Pre-Raphaelites and other minor groups.

== Writer ==
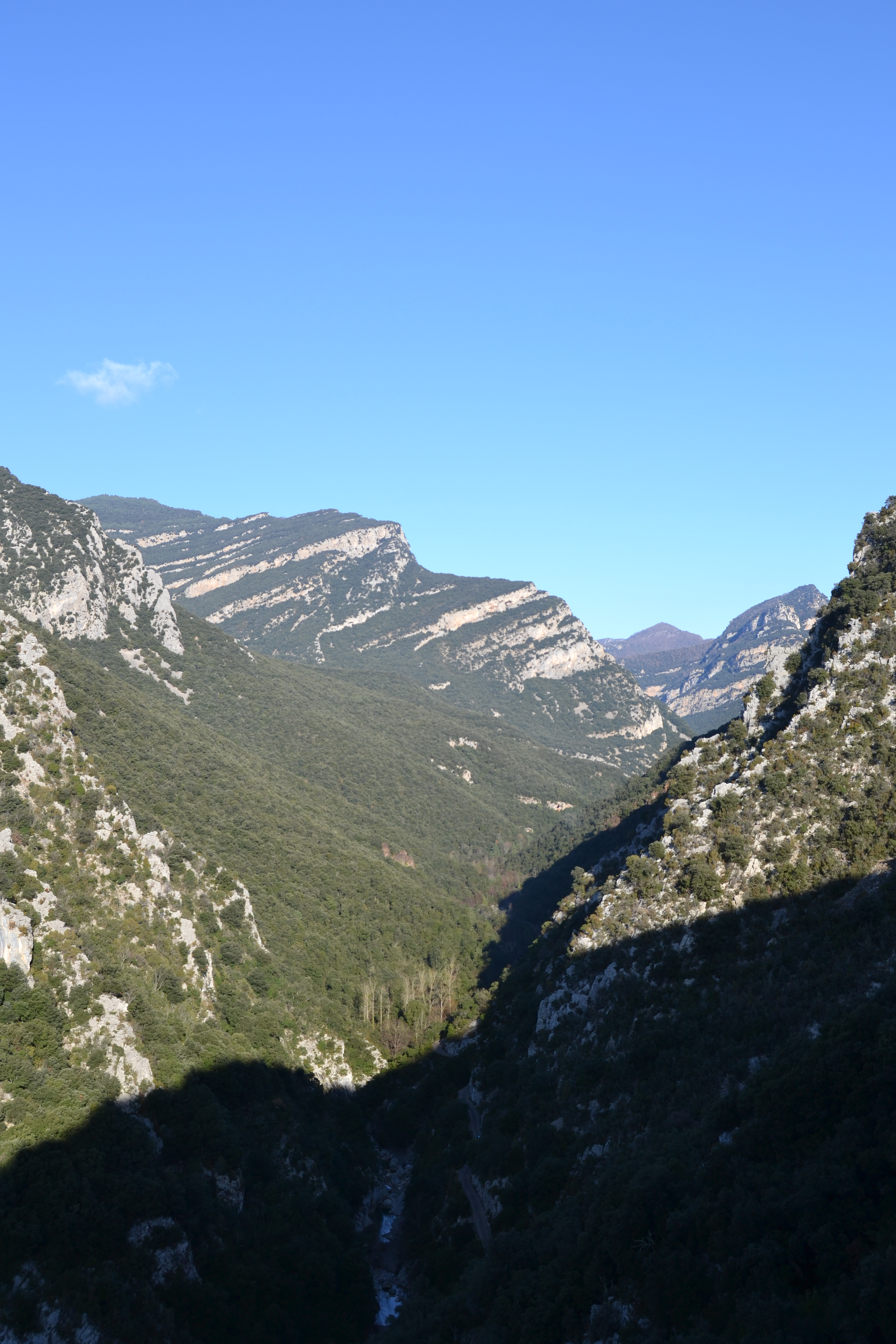
muntanya (Sant Aniol)

Though his 1888 literary debut was in Spanish, since 1890 Vayreda was publishing short stories in Catalan, printed – also under pen-names – in regional periodicals. Often set in the recent war, they were gaining popularity among readers; encouraged, in 1895 Vayreda started to participate in local literary competitions and turned out to be fairly successful. He wrote also few unedited poems.

In 1898 he published his first major work, Recorts de la darrera carlinada, a set of 14 carefully arranged stories from the Third Carlist War. Lively narrated in 1st person with declared intention to provide "veritat essencial", they differ in spirit and are heterogeneous in style, but assembled together acknowledged crude brutality of the war. Though the book occasionally contained some nostalgic Carlist tone, it refrained from political proselytism; few scholars even see a dose of cynicism. Some present-day critics compare Recorts to war stories of Hemingway and Babel; others consider Vayreda's stories his best work and declare him master of short prose.

Sanch nova (1900) is a contemporary novel set in Alt Garrotxa ambience and focusing on confrontation between modern liberal spirit and traditionalist virtues, embodied in a protagonist, a Catalan priest. Contemporaries hailed Sanch as "novella nacional" of Catalonia or "verdader simbol de Catalunya renaixent", declaring the author "primer novellista del renaixement". Currently it is viewed as overburdened with didactics and ideology, declared anachronistic pamphlet and utopian idealization of inner Catalonia, represented by mountainous lifestyle pitted against degradation of new society. The "new blood" in title is nothing but established rural outlook; the book is labeled compendium of traditionalist regionalism or even Vayreda's political testament.

La punyalada

La Punyalada was published posthumously in 1904; though probably missing final touch of the author, it is widely considered his best work which gained Vayreda prominent place in history of the Catalan literature; the novel itself is acclaimed as one of the best works ever written in Catalan. Set in the early 1840s it tells a rural love story against the background of Alt Garrotxa life troubled by local bandits, the trabucaires. It was originally classified as "novela ferrena", "novela objectiva" or "novela historica", though currently scholars focus rather on psychological dimension and ideological undertones; they note exceptional quality of personalities, intriguing narrative technique, putting nature as a protagonist and efficient use of symbols. Though some scholars claim that apparent absence of politics and ideology is sort of credo itself, others maintain that Punyalada contains a veiled political discourse, with one protagonist representing the evil side of Carlism and another one its attractive face.

As a writer Vayreda is not clearly associated with any specific literary group. Some of his contemporaries considered him late follower of Walter Scott school; others noted lack of romantic gloom and underlining at times bestial brutality put Vayreda next to scandalizing naturalists like Casellas or Victor Catala. Hints at modernism and symbolism are not uncommon. However, according to the most popular lineup Vayreda is first and foremost a protagonist of the Catalan literary Renaixença, the author who died just when reaching literary maturity.

== Reception and legacy ==
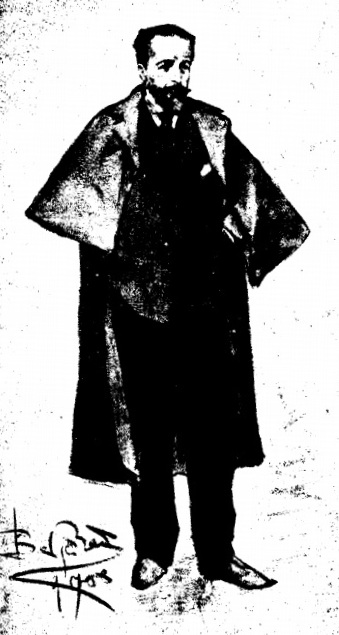
Vayreda ca. 1903

Some sources claim that Vayreda was disappointed by limited success of his paintings; displayed at Catalan and Madrid galleries, they enjoyed polite acknowledgement falling short of universal acclaim, let alone fame. He gained some popularity with stories published in the 1890s, but it was Recorts and Sanch nova which earned him general recognition shortly before death. Vayreda did not live to see success of La Punyalada both among the readers and the critics. Riding the wave of growing Catalanism in first decades of the 20th century the novel was declared its iconic literature, though second edition appeared as late as 1921. Vayreda was acknowledged in history of Catalan literature during the Republic, though it is not clear how many of his paintings were burnt down during takeover of Olot by Republican militia in the summer of 1936. He became sort of officially celebrated artist during Francoism, which maintained silence on his Catalan penchant but emphasized the Traditionalist leaning instead. Punyalada enjoyed its third edition in 1947 and Recorts the second one in 1950. Centenary of his birth was observed in 1953: Olot declared him hijo ilustre and staged appropriate sessions, while periodicals – including the Falangist ¡Arriba España! – published homage articles. In the 1960s a hall in the Olot ajuntament building was named after Vayreda and in 1966 the council established Mariano Vayreda literary prize; some cities honored him with appropriate street names.

Vayreda received sort of literary canonization after the fall of Francoism, the process commenced by História de la literatura catalana of Riquer, Comas and Molas and continued in numerous academic books, scholarly reviews and popular press items. Since 1980 La Punyalada was published 7 times and served as script for a 1990 movie, which became sort of an icon itself. A tourist trail following La Punyalada plot was marked in the Pyrenees and Vayreda's life was even treated in a children's cartoon. He remains portrayed as one of the all-time masters of Catalan literature, the process climaxing in massive centenary celebrations – covering both his literary works and paintings – of 2003. A dedicated study of his elevation process suggests that it was a perfect example of critical literary reception serving as a function of ideological scheme, namely as agent of Catalan nation-building.

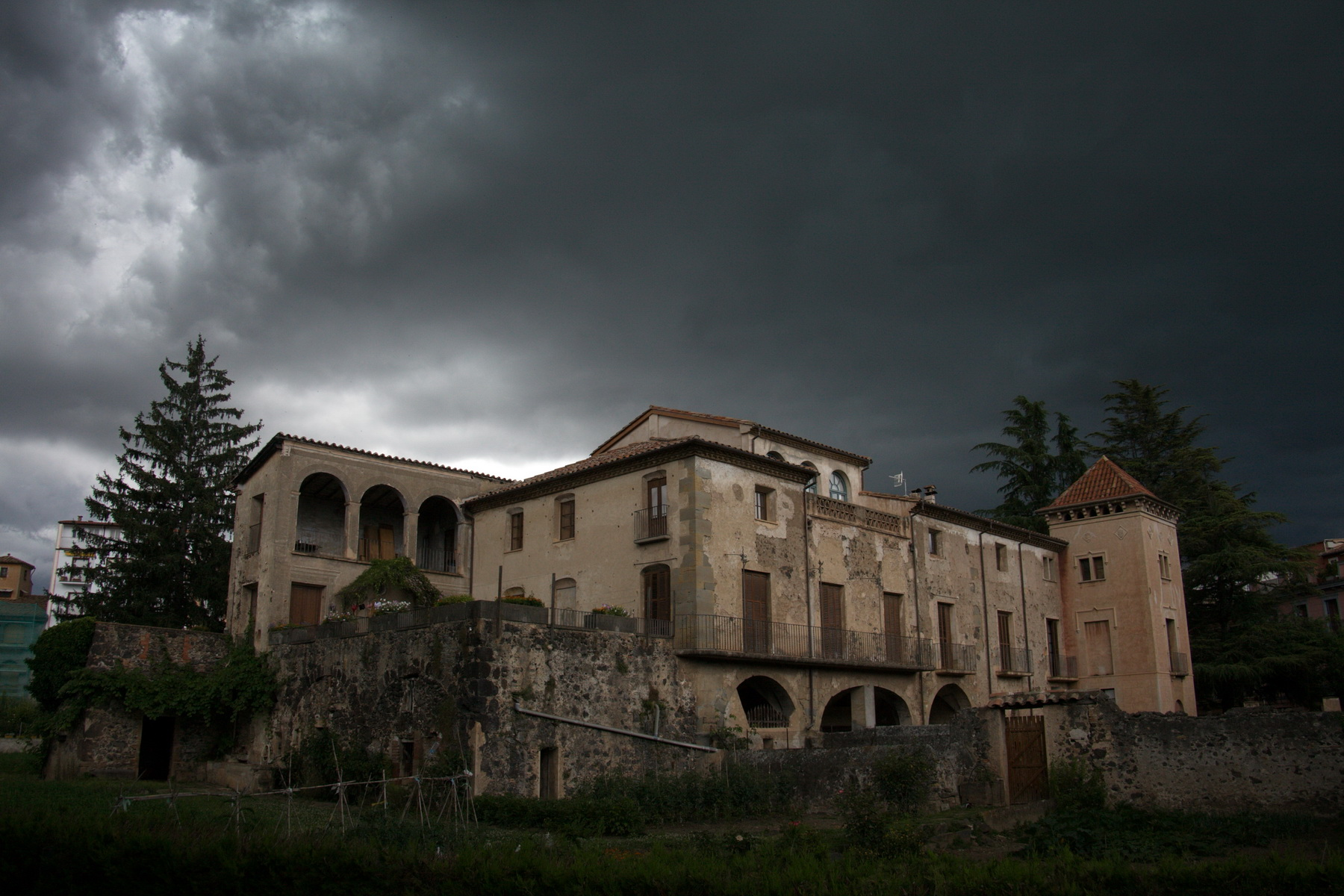
Casa Vayreda in Olot

Scholarly works on Vayreda's outlook as expressed in his art and political activities suggests that he can hardly be considered an obvious forerunner of Catalan nationalism, that he can not be portrayed as example of a natural shift towards it, and that such approach involves a not insignificant dose of distortion. In an alternative perspective offered, emergent modern Catalanism was a competitive vision that he actually opposed. Considered within this framework, L’Escola d’Olot ultimately failed when attempting to implant its vision of Catalunya muntanyenca, the rural land of mountains and forests, entrenched in pairalismo culture and spiritually set between Jansenism, Traditionalism and Enlightenment. Most critics referred to it as idealized, paternalistic utopia, Arcadia or paradise lost, though some claim to have found sadomasochist and homosexual threads in his writings.

== See also ==
- Carlism
- Joaquim Vayreda
- Garrotxa
- Renaixença
- La puñalada
- Catalanismo
- El combregar a muntanya
- Josep Berga i Boix

== Footnotes ==
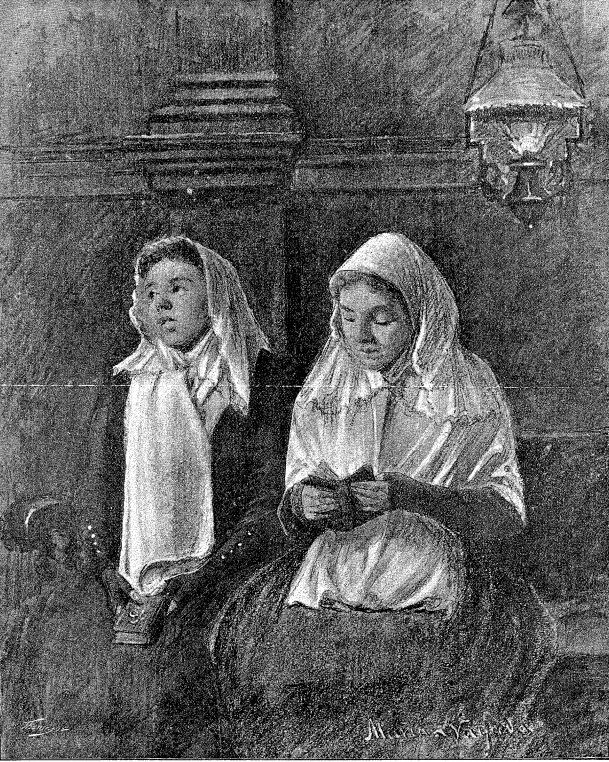
Les deseneres, charcoal, around 1894
