= Joaquim Vayreda =

Spanish landscape painter

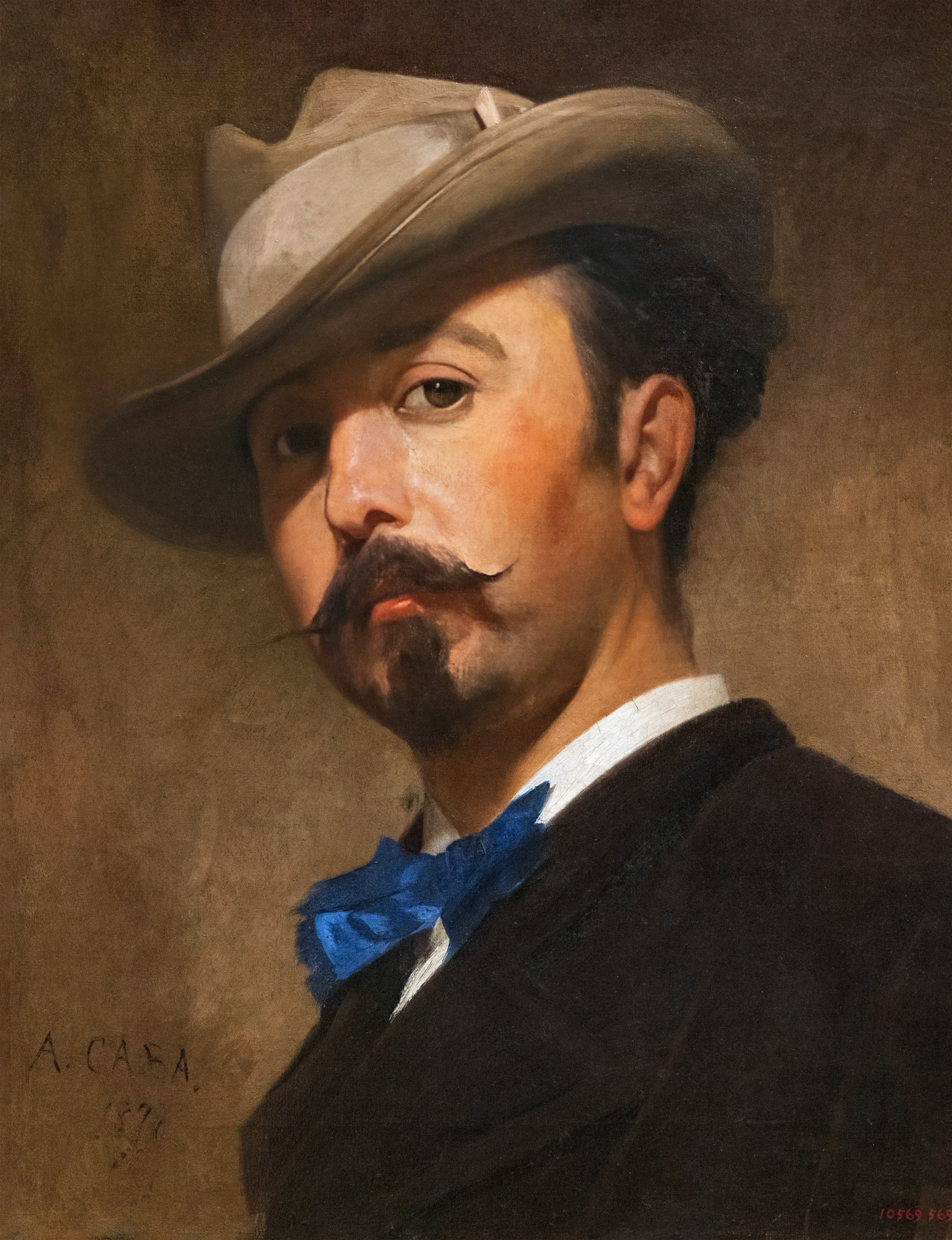
Joaquim Vayreda; portrait by Antoni Caba (1870)

Joaquim Vayreda i Vila (23 May 1843 – 31 October 1894) was a Spanish landscape painter. He was originally influenced by the Barbizon school, but later became one of the founders of the Olot school.

== Biography ==
Vayreda was born in Girona, Spain. His family was originally from Olot, but had to move to Girona when their home was destroyed during the First Carlist War. A year after his birth, his parents returned to Olot and attempted to reestablish themselves.

His father was fond of drawing and when he saw that his son had artistic talent, set him to work copying drawings. His first art lessons came when he was only nine, at the drawing school in Olot, operated by Narcís Pascual i Sala (1805–1869). In 1860, he went to Barcelona to study philosophy, but spent his spare time learning to paint with Ramon Martí Alsina, who introduced him to landscape painting en plein aire. He had his first showing in 1865. The following year, he started to exhibit regularly at the Sala Parés and began to attract customers from the bourgeoisie.

He had to live in France briefly, following the Revolution of 1868. There, he became acquainted with the Barbizon school of landscape painting and met Josep Berga i Boix, who would later be his partner in several enterprises. Upon his return, he and his brother Marian would begin to establish what became known as the Olot school.

In 1872, he was appointed Deputy-Mayor of Olot, but resigned after only three months due to the outbreak of the Third Carlist War. He went into self-exile in France and remained there until 1877. Three years later, he joined with Josep Berga i Boix and others to create a special workshop for religious images called "Els Sants d'Olot". He also regained his position with the city; serving from 1881 to 1883. From 1891 until his death he was a Provincial Deputy to the assembly in Manresa and participated in writing the Catalan Regional Constitution. He also contributed political opinion pieces to local periodicals. He died in Olot, aged 51.

== Work ==
Vayreda's early work consists primarily of religious scenes and costumbrismo. Only later did he dedicate himself to landscape painting. His work is considered a precursor to the avant-garde in Spain. His Olot Landscapes (Paisajes de Olot) resemble a Catalan version of Camille Corot, particularly after his encounter with the Barbizon school. His works are dominated by browns, ochers, greens, and earth tones. His works include Procesión de colegialas, La siega, La primavera, Los primeros pantalones (1871), El bautizo y el verano (1877), and Flores de abril (1881). Apart from oil paintings, Vayreda also made ink drawings, watercolors, and etchings. Some of his works are painted jointly with his brother, Marian.

== Selected paintings ==
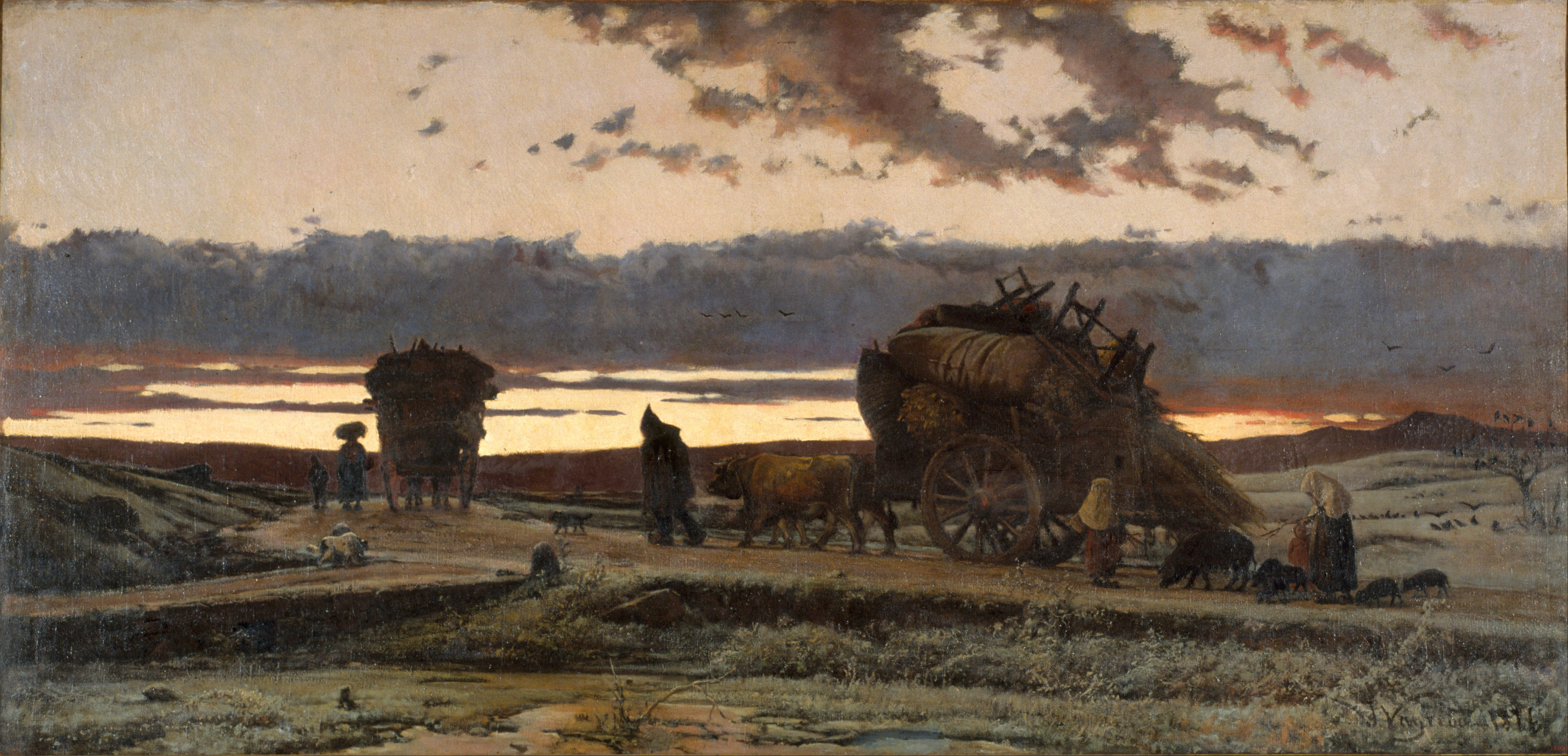
Sorrow

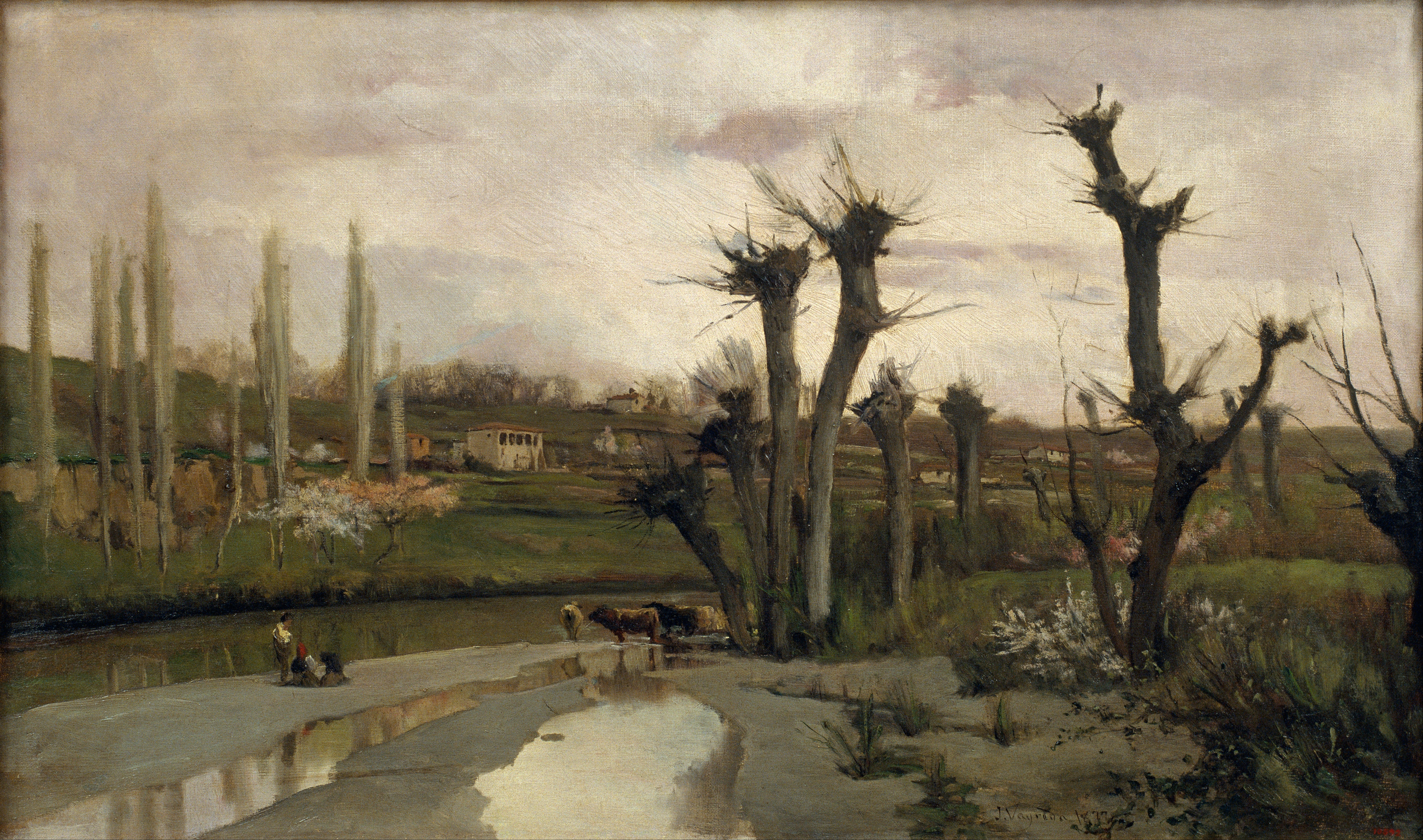
The Beginning of Spring

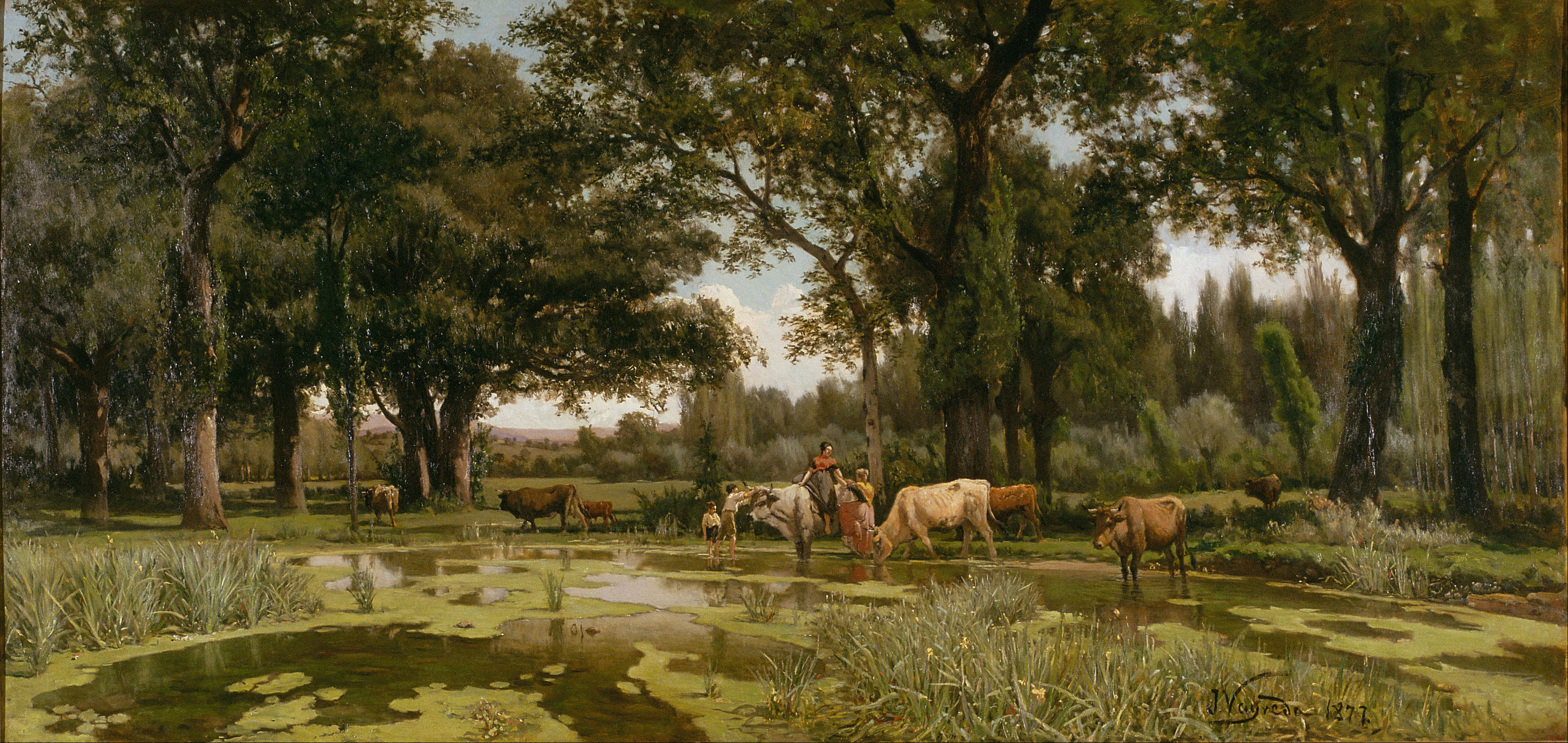
Summer Blooms

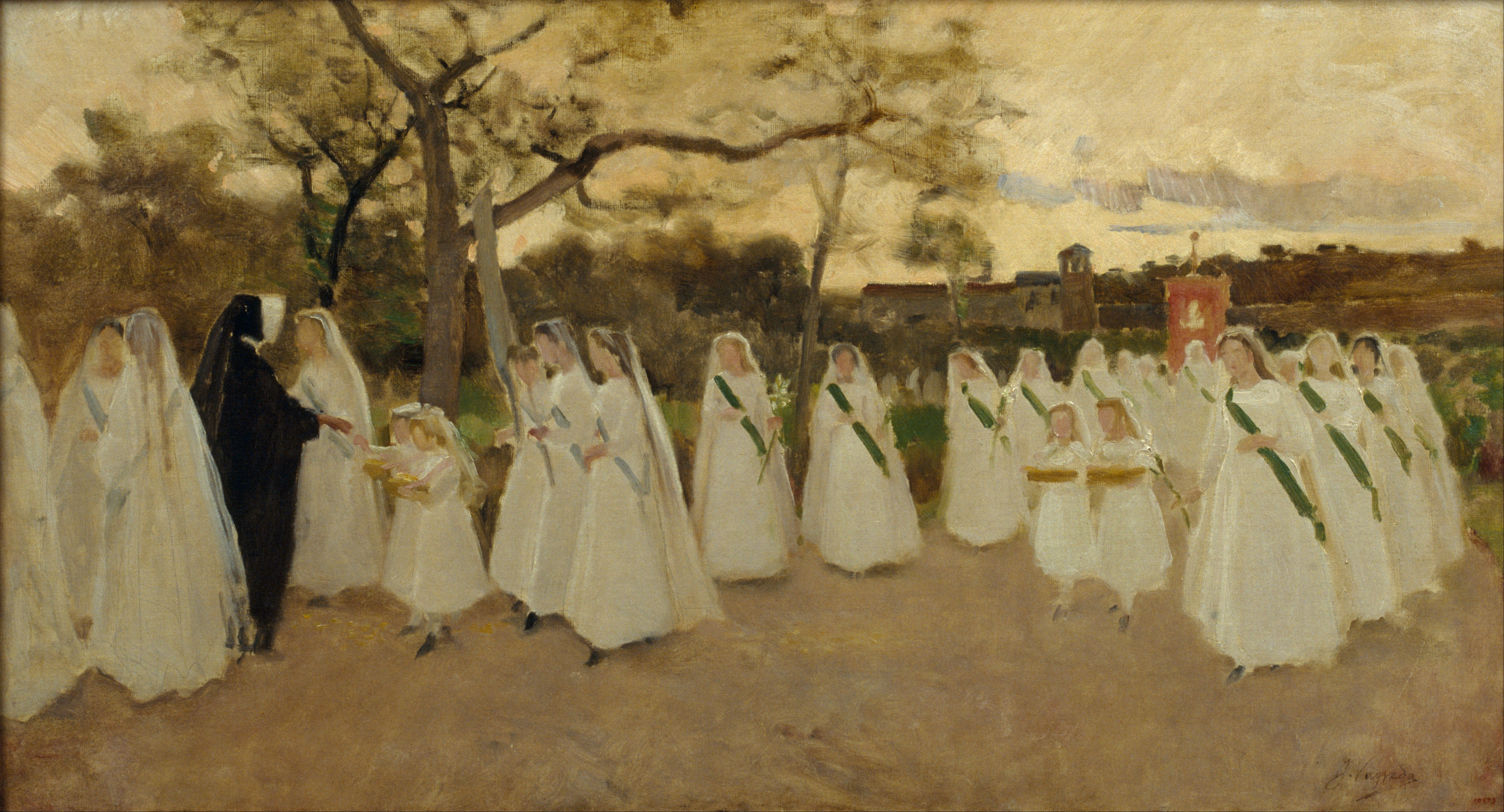
Procession of Schoolgirls

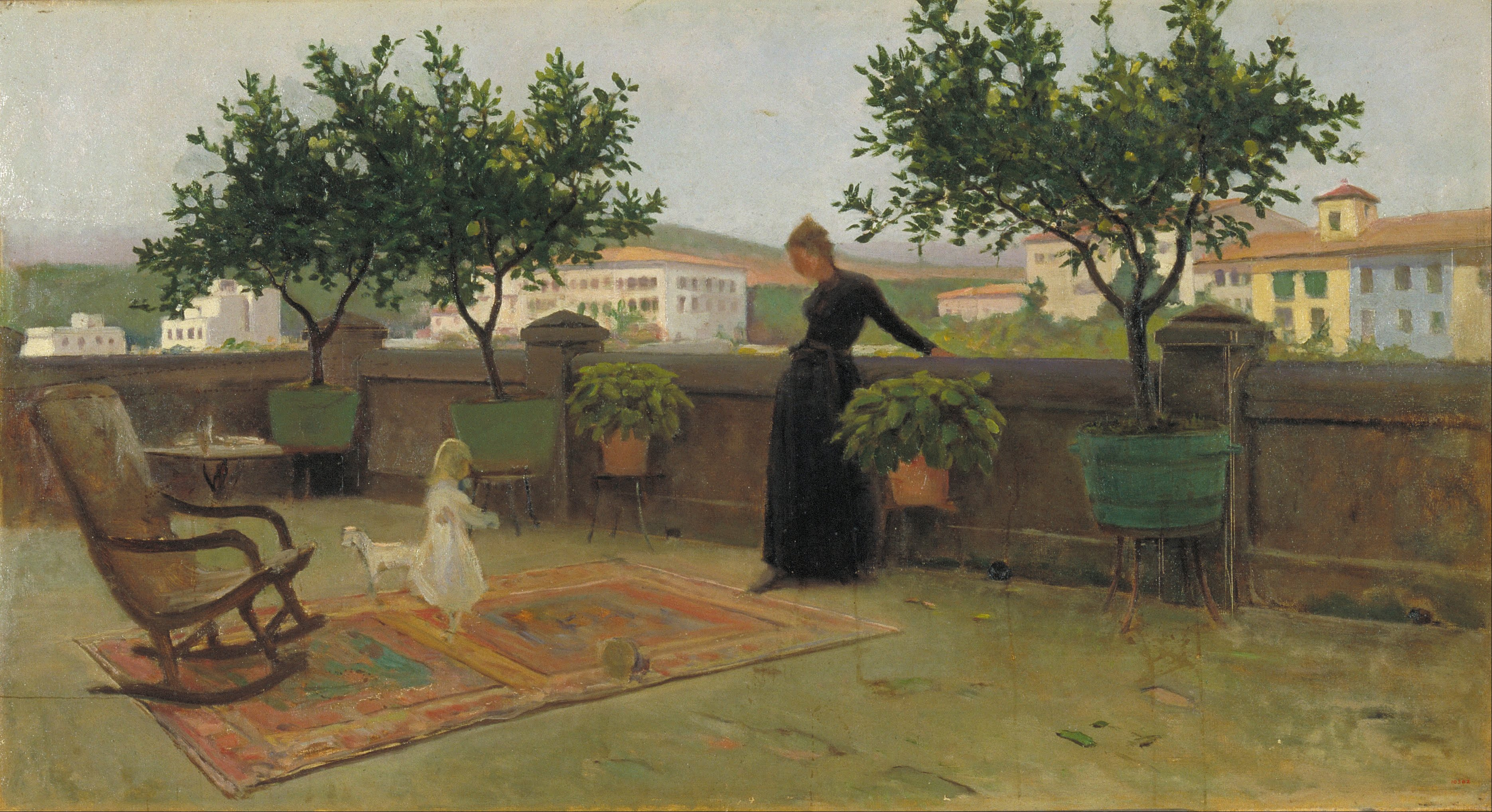
On the Terrace

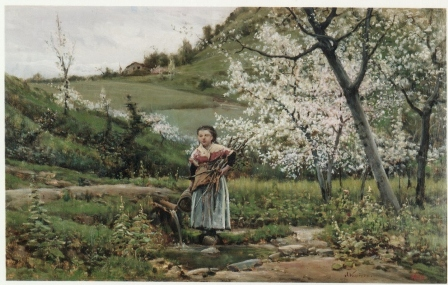
Spring

== See also ==
- Marian Vayreda i Vila, Joaquim brother
