= Salt, Spain =

Salt
- Municipality
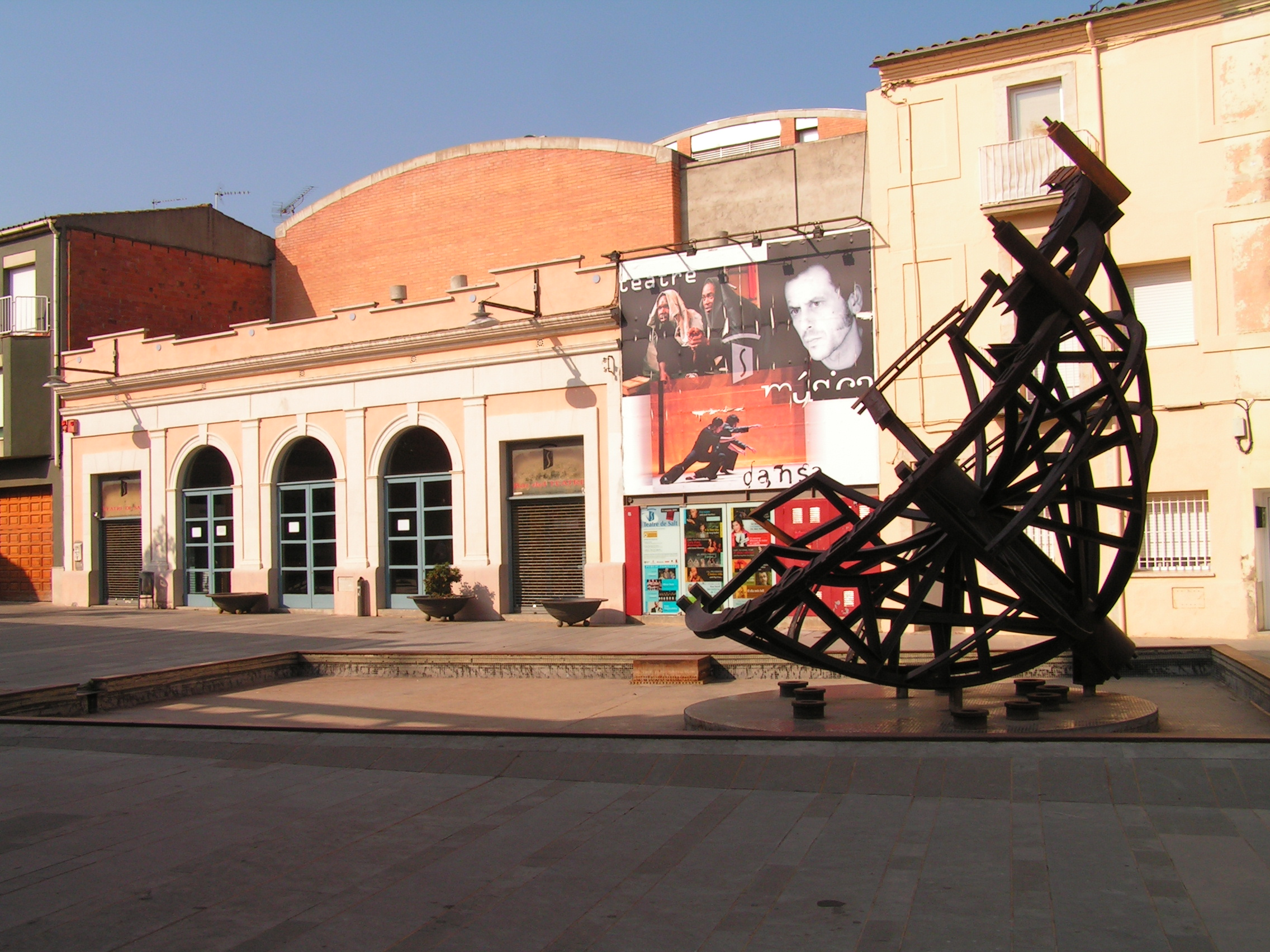
- Salt theatre

- Coat of arms
- Location of Salt
- Location within Catalonia Location within Spain
- Coordinates: 41°58′34″N 2°47′17″E
- Country: Spain
- Community: Catalonia
- Province: Girona
- Comarca: Gironès

Government
  - Mayor: Jordi Viñas Xifra (2015)

Area
  - Total: 6.6 km^{2} (2.5 sq mi)
- Elevation: 83 m (272 ft)

Population (2025-01-01)
  - Total: 34,491
  - Density: 5,200/km^{2} (14,000/sq mi)
- Demonym(s): Saltenc, saltenca
- Website: viladesalt.cat

Salt (Catalan pronunciation: [ˈsal]) is a municipality in the comarca of the Gironès in Catalonia. It is situated on the right bank of the Ter next to Girona, with which it was merged from 1974 to 1984. The A-7 autopista and N-141 road pass through the municipality.

From 1895, Salt was the temporary Girona terminus of the narrow gauge Olot–Girona railway, until the short section to Girona railway station was opened in 1898. Initially the line ran only as far as Amer, but it was extended to Les Planes d'Hostoles in 1900, Sant Feliu de Pallerols in 1902 and Olot in 1911. The line closed in 1969 and has since been converted into a greenway.

== Demography ==
Largest groups of foreign residents
Nationality	Population (2013)
Morocco	5,032
Gambia	1,863
Honduras	1,272
Mali	728
Senegal	554

Salt is known for its elevated ethnic diversity. Over 77 nationalities are represented in the population of Salt: In 2011, 17,739 (56%) were Spanish, 5,032 (15%) were Moroccan; 1,863 (6%) Gambians; 1,272 (4%) Honduran; 728 (2%) Malian, and 554 (1.7%) Senegalese.

1900	1930	1950	1970	1986	2007
2280	5360	5956	11,365	21,081	27,673

== Manufacturing ==
Salt is the home of Gas Gas, who manufacture and export off-road motorcycles and all-terrain vehicles worldwide from their Salt base.

== Notable people ==
- Lluís Dilmé i Romagós (b. 1960), architect and urban planner
- Delfí Geli (b. 1969), footballer
- Anna Allen (b. 1977), actress

== Bibliography ==
- Panareda Clopés, Josep Maria; Rios Calvet, Jaume; Rabella Vives, Josep Maria (1989). Guia de Catalunya, Barcelona: Caixa de Catalunya. ISBN 84-87135-01-3 (Spanish). ISBN 84-87135-02-1 (Catalan).
