= Amer, Spain =

Amer
- Municipality
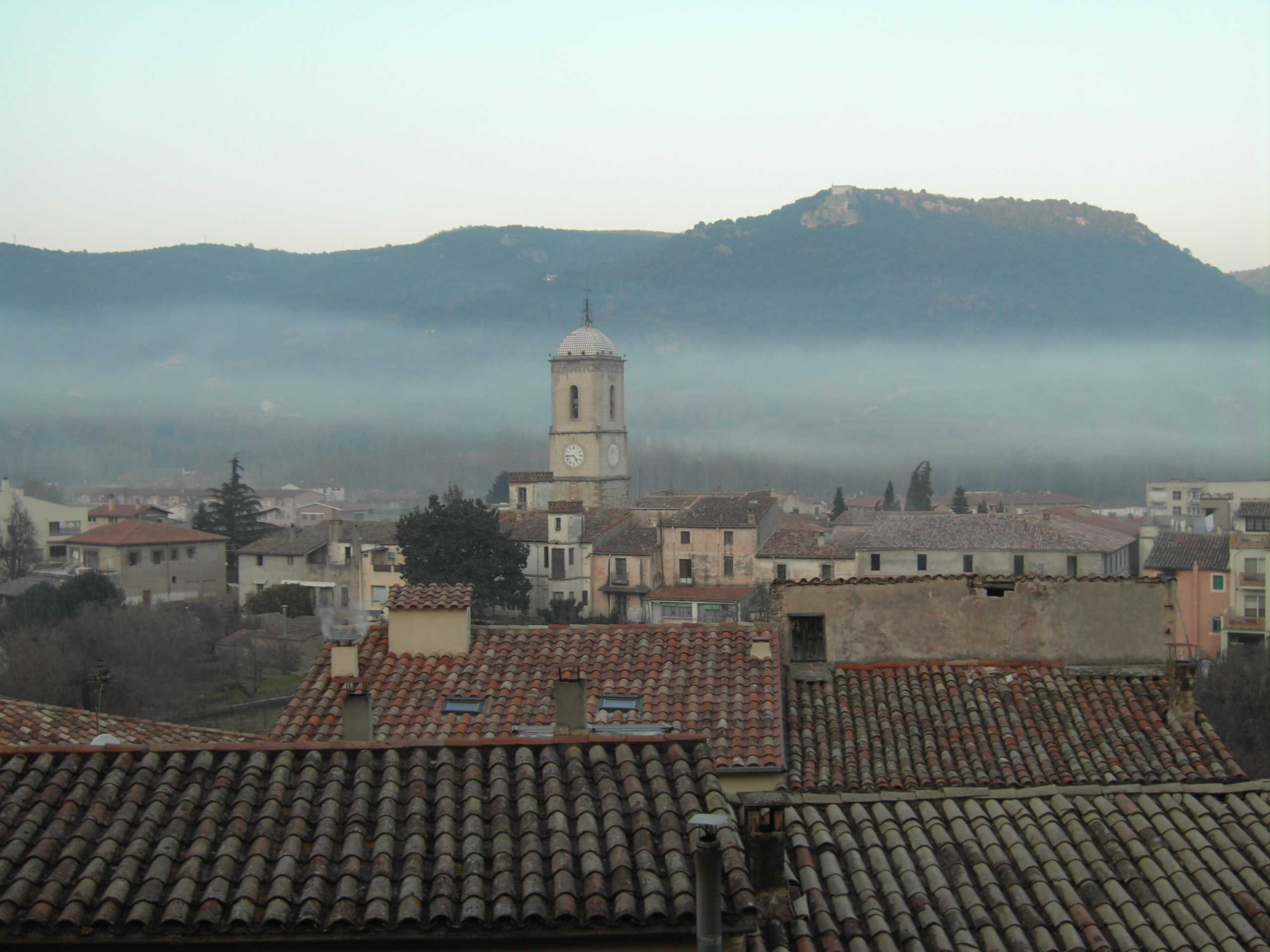
- View of Amer

- Location in Province of Girona Location in Catalonia Location in Spain
- Coordinates: 42°0′45″N 2°36′14″E
- Country: Spain
- Community: Catalonia
- Province: Girona
- Comarca: Selva

Government
  - mayor: Maria Rosa Vila Juanhuix (2015)

Area
  - Total: 40.1 km^{2} (15.5 sq mi)
- Elevation: 186 m (610 ft)

Population (2025-01-01)
  - Total: 2,422
  - Density: 60.4/km^{2} (156/sq mi)
- Postal code: 17007
- Website: www.amer.cat

Amer (Catalan pronunciation: [əˈmeɾ]) is a municipality in the comarca of la Selva in the province of Girona, Catalonia, Spain.

From 1895, Amer was linked to Girona by the narrow gauge Olot–Girona railway, which was extended to Les Planes d'Hostoles in 1900, Sant Feliu de Pallerols in 1902 and Olot in 1911. The line closed in 1969 and has since been converted into a greenway.

== History ==
The first documentary news about the municipality regards the battle that took place between Charlemagne's army and the Moors in the year 785 in the Indret de Sant Corneli in the town of Sant Climent d'Amer.

== Villages ==
- Amer 1.897
- Costa de Santa Brígida, la 53
- Grup Solivent, 206
- Lloret Salvatge, 3
- Palou, 24
- Sant Climent d'Amer, 35
- Sant Genís, 0
- Veïnat de la Jonquera, 21
- Veïnat del Colomer, 7
- Veïnat del Mont, 12

== Notable people ==
- Carles Puigdemont, President of the Government of Catalonia who led the creation of a referendum on Catalan independence in 2017, was born in Amer in 1962.
- Pere Buxó Domènech, musician, composer and pianist. (Amer, 13 November 1916 - Amer, 30 December 1998).

== Traditions ==
- La Sardana de l'alcalde.
- Esclafar burros.
- World competition of snail whistle, on the first Sunday of February at the hermitage of Santa Brígida.
