= Domènec Fita i Molat =

Spanish artist (1927–2020)

Domènec Fita
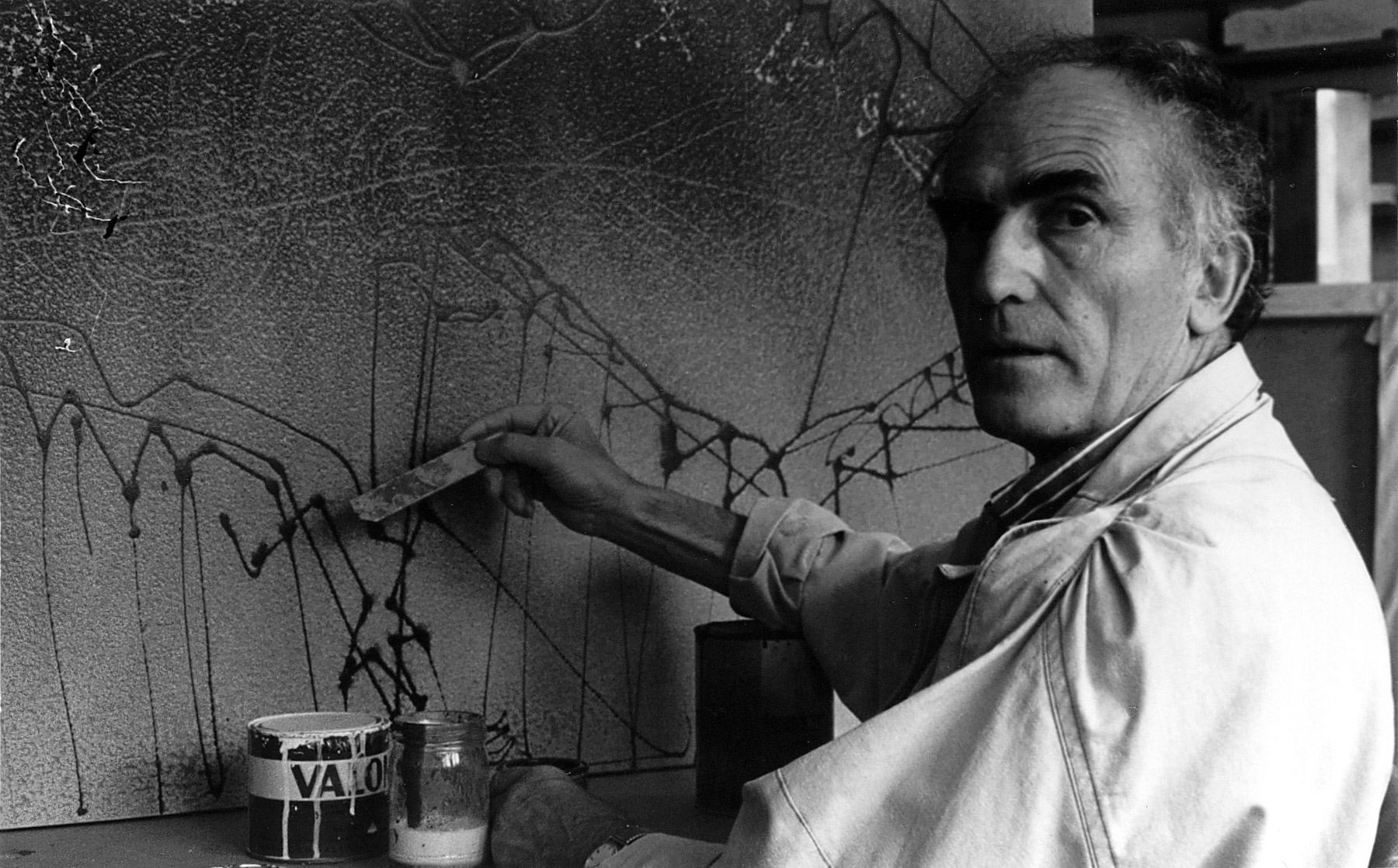
- Domènec Fita working in his studio, 1991.
- Born: Domènec Fita i Molat; 10 August 1927; Girona
- Died: 9 November 2020 (aged 93)
- Education: School of Arts and Crafts Olot, School of Fine Arts in Girona, College of Fine Arts of Saint George in Barcelona
- Known for: Painting, Drawing, Sculpture, Stained glass, Ceramics, Engraving
- Awards: In 1984 he was appointed academic member of the Royal Catalan Academy of Fine Arts of Saint George. In 1991 he was awarded the Gold Medal of the Diputació de Girona. In 2006 he received the Cross of St. George of the Generalitat de Catalunya, and the 2011 Medal of the University of Girona.

Domènec Fita i Molat (Catalan pronunciation: [duˈmɛnək ˈfitəj muˈlat]; 10 August 1927 – 9 November 2020) was a Spanish artist. Having studied in different schools of classical fine arts (Girona, Olot and Barcelona), his work was gradually stripped of academicism, as evidenced already in his first notable works: the Recumbent Christ (1958), the Cathedral of Girona, and Saint Benedict (1961) the abbey of Montserrat. The mural painting or on different media, initially and primarily of religious subjects, but also the drawing (themes retrat (portrait), nus (knot) and bestiari (bestiary), ceramics, concrete, stained glass, the use of polyurethane, stone, and alabaster, iron, steel, wood and various other materials have shaped the course of fifteen years of intensive work, producing a multi-faceted and difficult rating, which has derived radical abstraction, based on a systematic search, serial and unpredictable, avoiding the isms in use.

Deciding in favor of integrating the arts and architecture in public spaces, his large scale works are visible in places and buildings as iconic as the Sagrada Familia in Barcelona, Girona and Vic cathedral, monastery of Montserrat, ... and places of Canillo and Ordino (Andorra), Girona, Vic, Roses, Olot, ...

== Biography ==
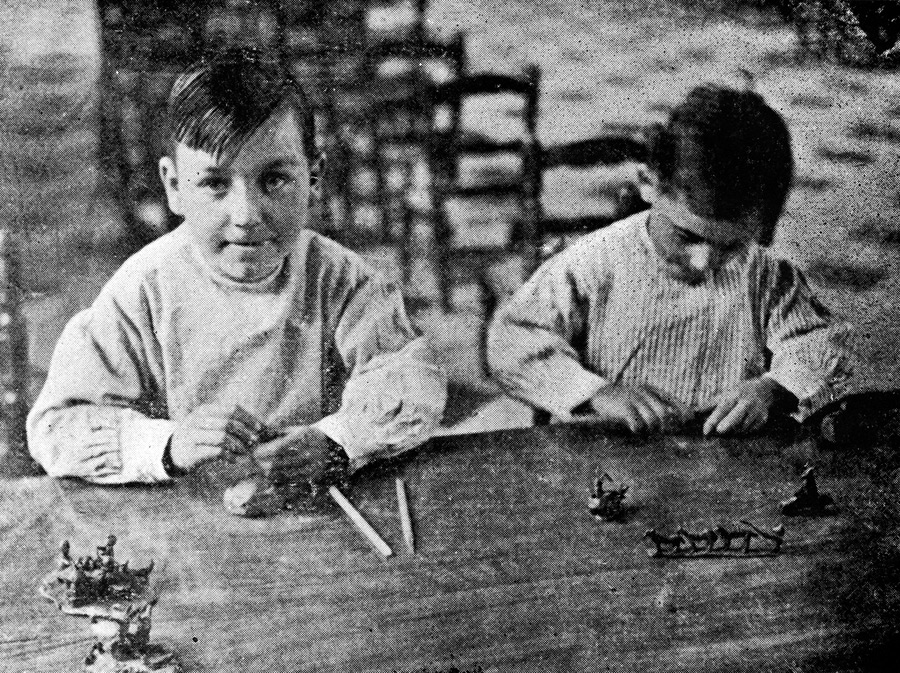
Domènec Fita (a la dreta) i Enric Homet fent figures de plastilina per al President Macià a la Casa d'Assistència de Girona, l'any 1932.

On 10 August 1927 Domènec Fita was born at the maternity ward of Hospital in Girona. Within days of the move to Pujolàs house in Santa Pau, home of Rafael and Nuria Ventolà Llach.

1932-1939 Entered the House Education and Assistance of Girona, managed by the Generalitat of Catalonia and started studying in the Montessori system. During the war he also attended classes and mixed classes in the school Durruti in Girona.

Alongside his training generally, he began to follow the artistic teachings of Joan Carrera.

He studied sculpture and drawing at the School of Arts and Crafts Olot.

Attended classes with Joan Carrera at School of Fine Arts in Girona.

He studied sculpture, painting, drawing and engraving on the College of Fine Arts of Saint George in Barcelona. Attained the title of Professor of Drawing.

Romà Vallès, Joan Lleó, Domènec Fita, Francesc Carulla and Albert García formed the Flamma group.

1950-1952 Won three consecutive grants from the Foundation Amigó Cuyàs that allowed travel in Paris at Balearic Islands and all over the Iberian Peninsula.

On 13 December 1953 he suffered a serious accident while painting the mural of the baptistery of the Church of Bethlehem in Barcelona. He was hospitalized for three years, and remained paraplegic.

Settled to live and work in the Sarrià de Ter, Girona. On 2 February 1958 he married Àngela Rodeja i López.

He taught art at the Institute of Bell-lloc in Girona.

1969 Moved to live and work in Montjuic, Girona, where he lived until his death.

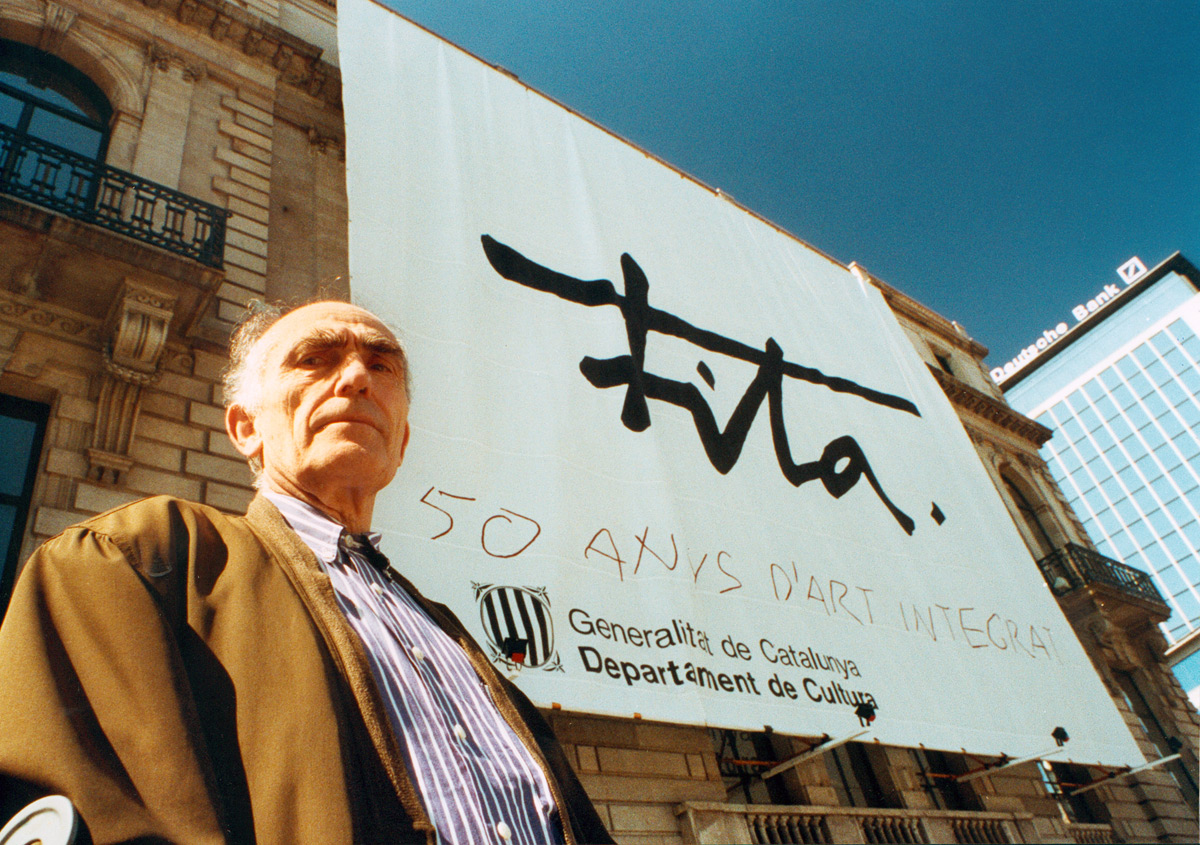
Domènec Fita in front of Palau Robert in Barcelona, for the 'Fita. 50 anys d'art integrat' exhibition. Generalitat de Catalunya, 1994.

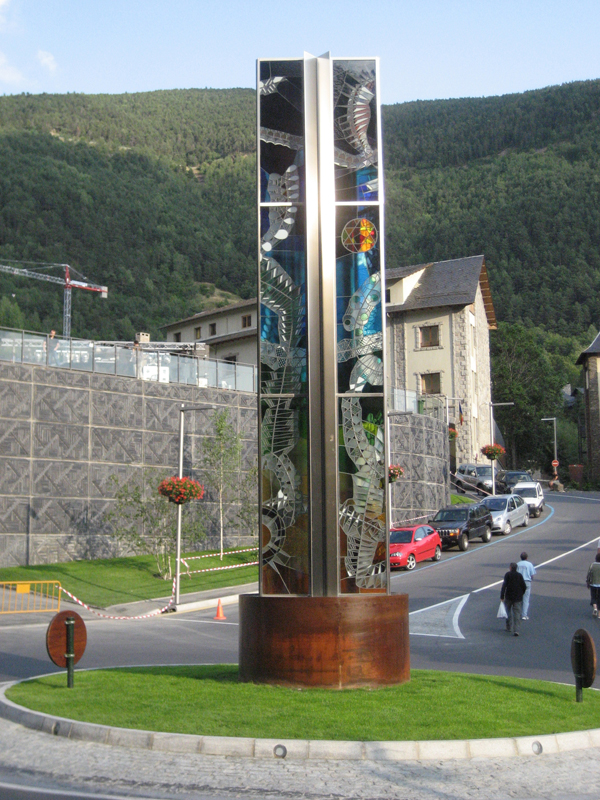
Column in Andorra's National Auditorium square. Ordino (Andorra). Sculpture and stained glass work, 2000

1969-1976 He taught history and theory of art in the General Study of Girona, linked to the Autonomous University of Barcelona.

He opened 'Estudi d'Art', where, aided by several contributors, taught sculpture, painting, drawing, ceramics and tapestry. Of the hundreds of students who pass from around Catalonia, 65 later studied at the fine arts college.

In 1984 he entered the Royal Catalan Academy of Fine Arts of Saint George as an academic member.

1991-2000 Concerned about the future of his legacy, and the desire to strengthen and perpetuate a personal act and think artistically, working to create a foundation. Finally, on 1 August 2000, Domènec Fita and Àngela Rodeja signed the constitution of the Fita Fita Foundation.

In 2006 received the Cross of St. George of the Generalitat of Catalonia.

In 2011 he received the medal of honor from the University of Girona.

Already in 2000, Fita had 109 solo exhibitions, 405 group exhibitions and 380 works made for hire.

He died on 9 November 2020.

== Works ==
=== Main works ===
- 1953 - Frescoes in the Church of Santa Susanna in Girona.
- 1958 - Recumbent Christ. Girona Cathedral.
- 1960 - Saint John and Saint Narcissus. Girona Cathedral façade.
- 1962 - Saint Benedict. Montserrat Monastery. Barcelona.
- 1964 - Mural on the façade of clinical Infirmorum Salus. Banyoles.
- 1971 - Sardana Monument. Lloret de Mar.
- 1990 - Fishermen Monument. Roses.
- 1985 - Column history. Girona.
- 2000-2005 - Hotels Sport. Soldeu (Andorra).
- 2002 - Oliba, Bishop of Vic, Abbot of Ripoll and Cuixà. Vic.
- 2010 - Bas-relief on the ground inside the portal of the Passion, Sagrada Família. (Barcelona).
- 2010 - The four Evangelists, Stained glass light fixtures, Sagrada Família. (Barcelona).

=== Stained glass ===
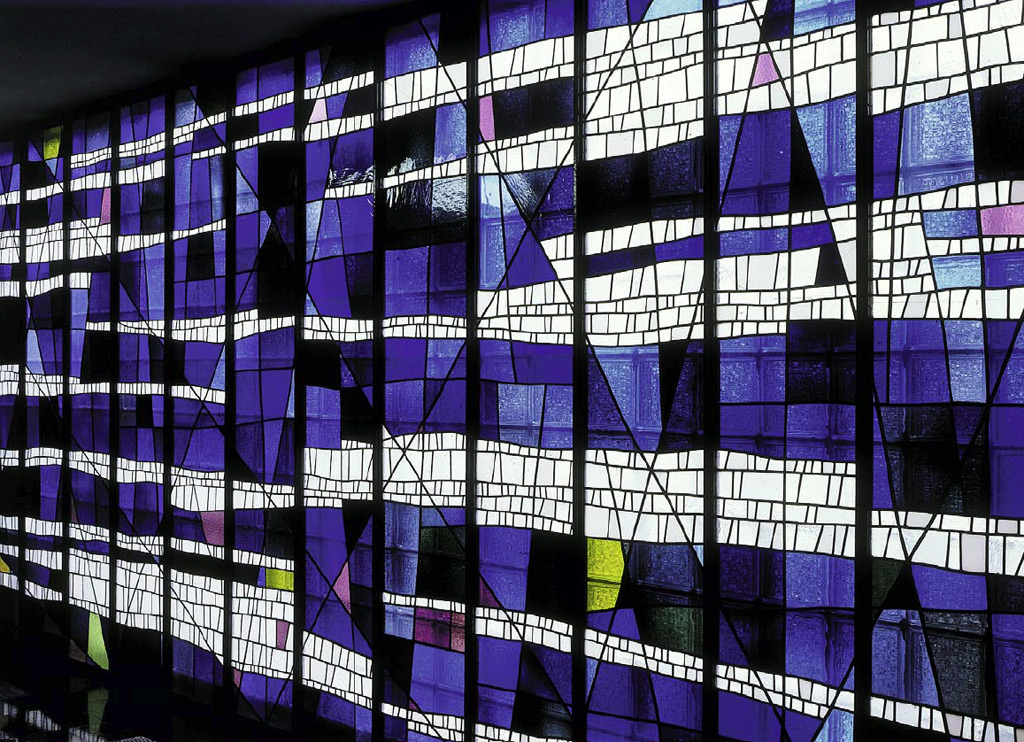
Stained glass at the Salus Infirmorum Clinic in Banyoles (1964), Banyoles.

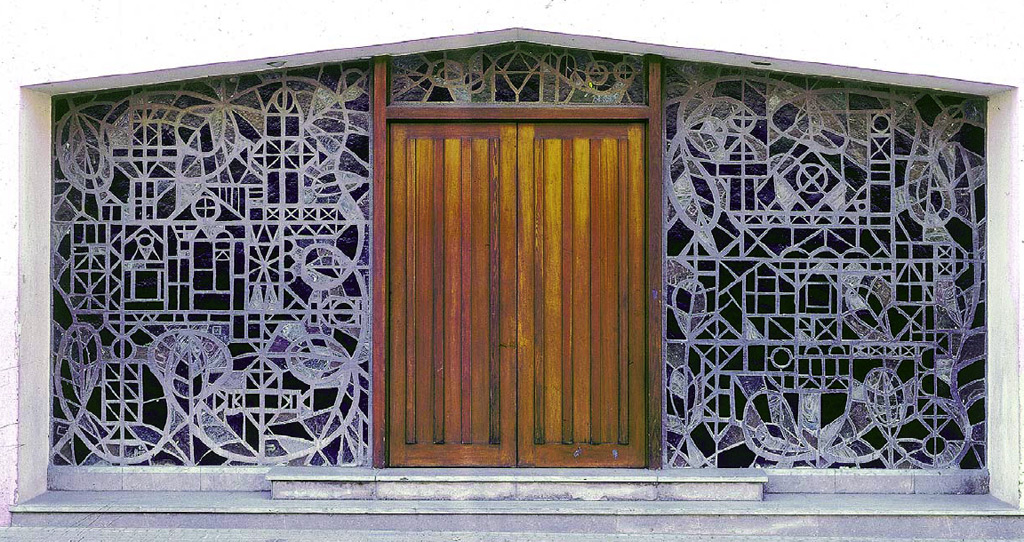
Outside of the stained glass of the Dominiques Chapel (1969), Pont Major, Girona.

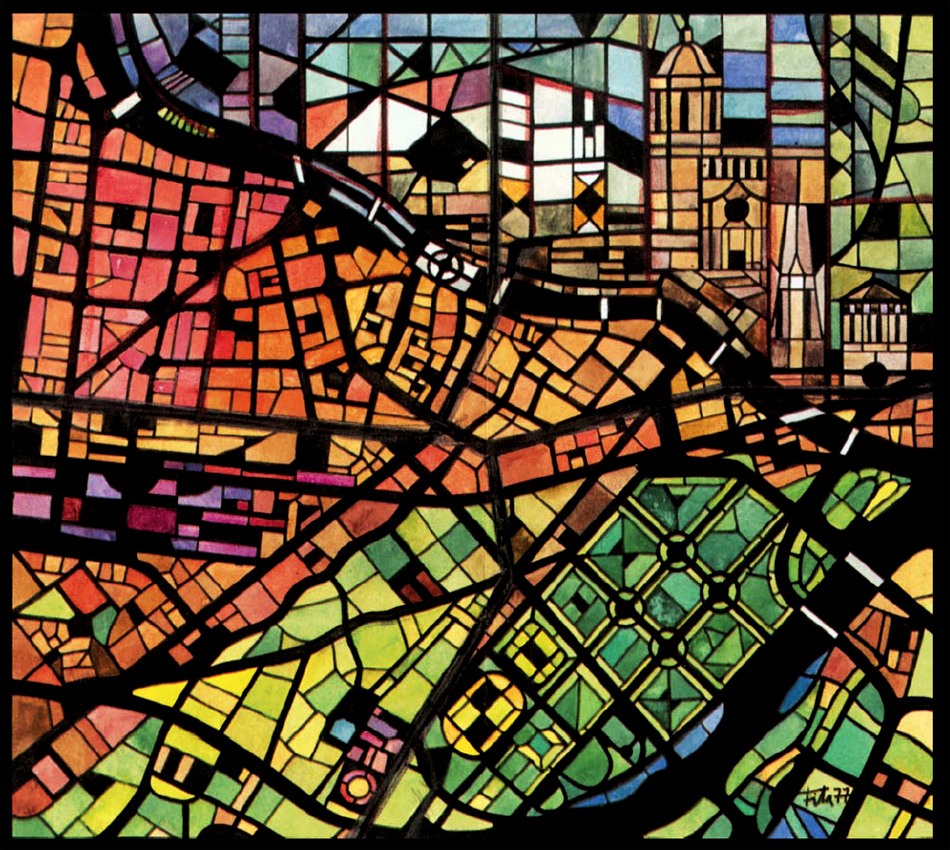
Stained glass study for Pro-Grup Girona (1977), Girona

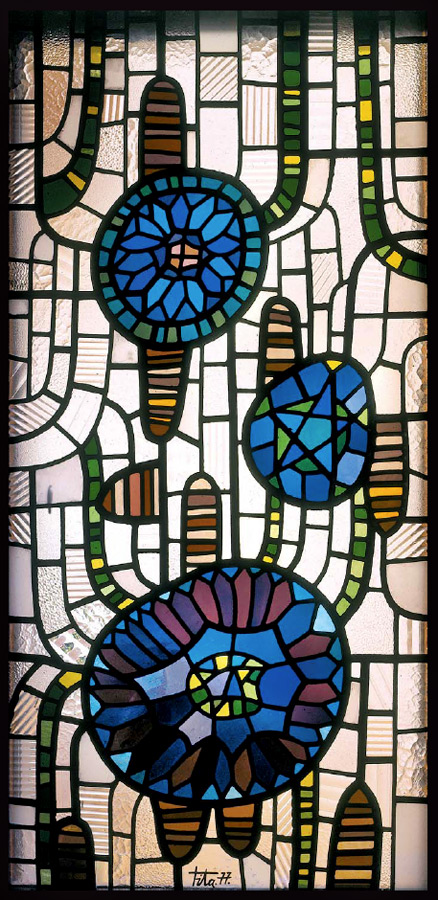
Adam house (1977), Girona.

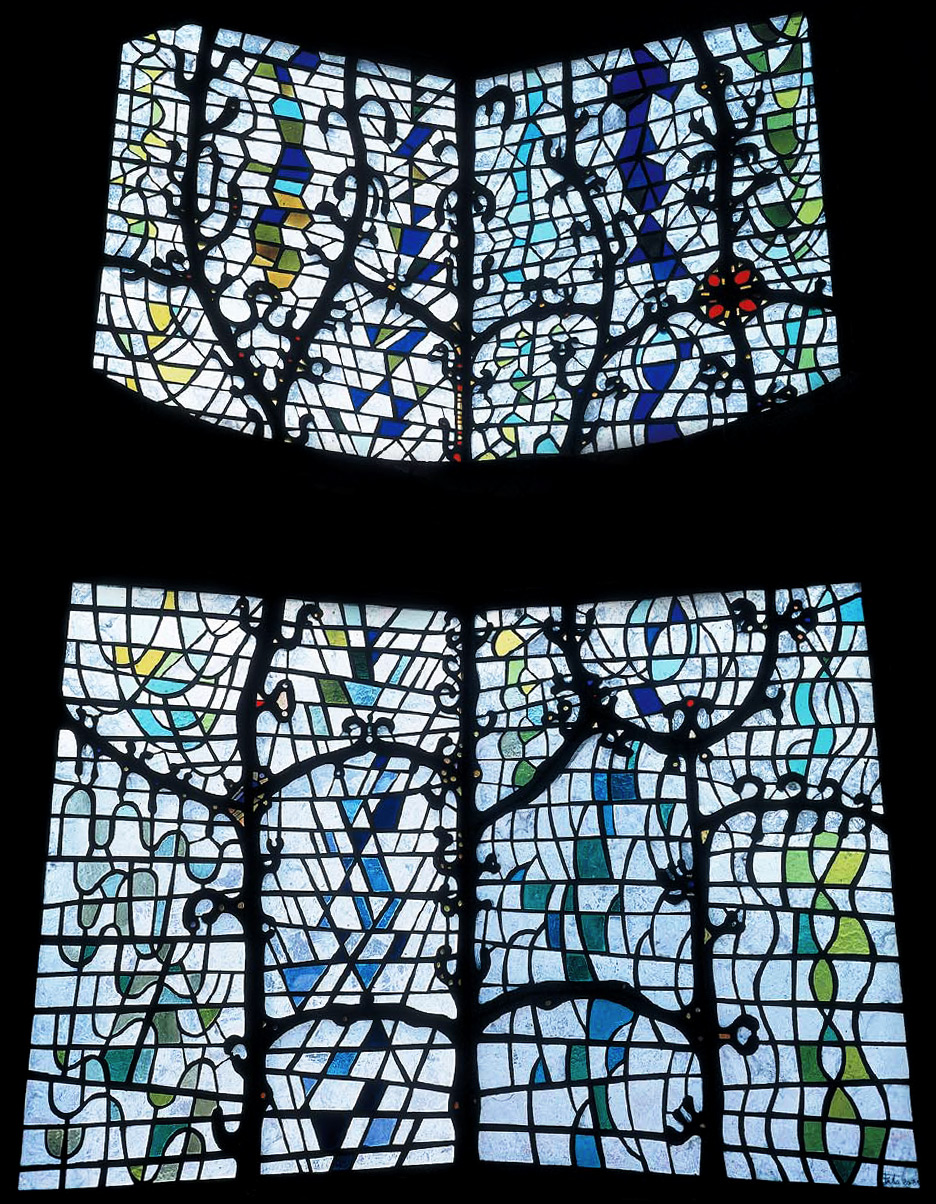
Stained glass in Montjuïc Center (1981), color glass and concrete, 4.46 x 5.15 m, Girona.

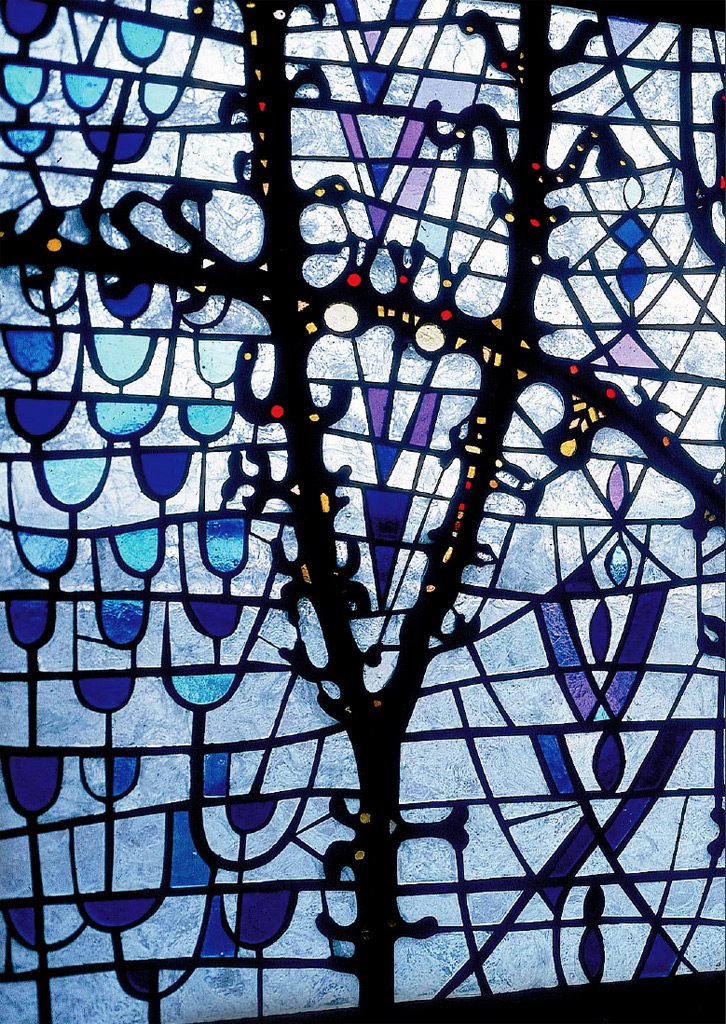
Detail of the stained glass in Montjuïc Center (1981), color glass and concrete, Girona.

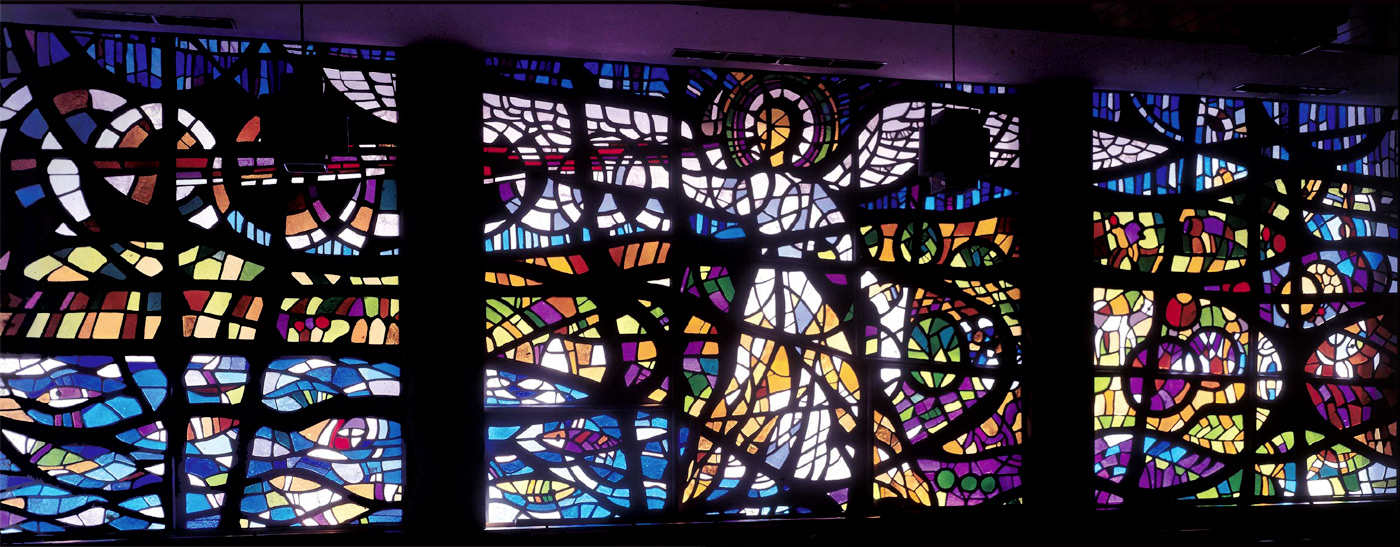
Cor de Maria church (1982), color glass and concrete, 14.0 x 4.19 m, Girona.

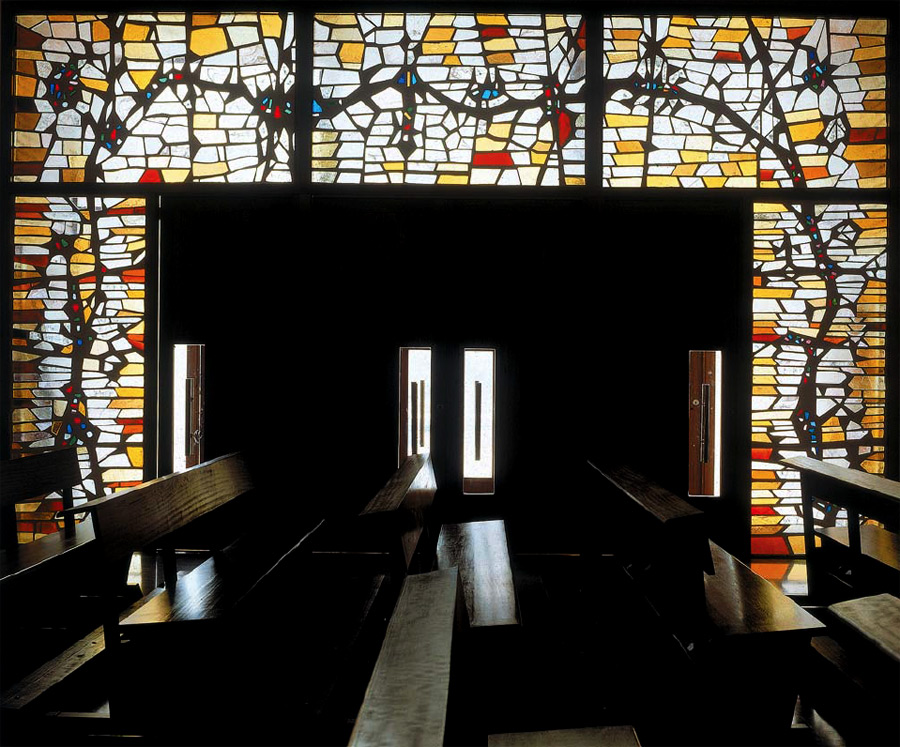
Interior of Stained glass in Parish of Saint Joseph (1993), color glass and concrete, Ripoll.

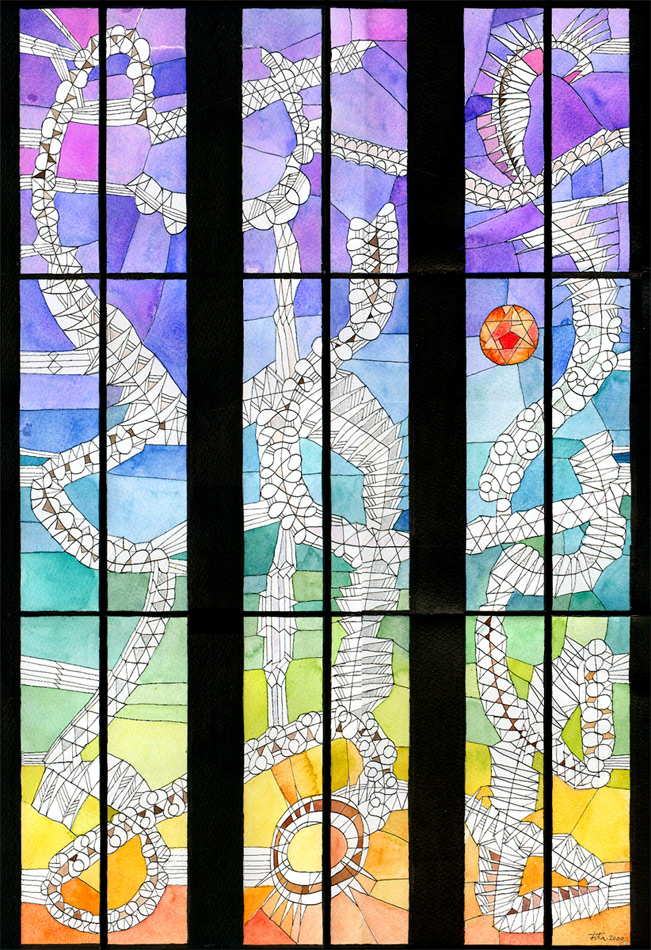
Study for an Obelisc in Ordino (2000), ink and watercolor on paper, Ordino (Andorra).

== Bibliography ==
- Fita, Domènec (March 1988). Diputació Provincial de Girona. Estudis, Documentació i Informació (ed.). Fita, vitralls 1956-1987 (in Catalan). Girona. ISBN 978-84-8681203-4.
- Fita, Domènec; Miralles, Francesc (June 1990). Diputació Provincial de Girona. Estudis, Documentació i Informació (ed.). Fita, pintura 1942-1989 (in Catalan). Girona. ISBN 978-84-8681218-8.
- Fita, Domènec (October 1992). Col·legi Oficial d'Aparelladors i Arquitectes Tècnics de Girona (ed.). Fita: periple d'un any (in Catalan). Girona. ISBN 978-84-6008268-2.
- Goday, Sebastià (August 1994). Entitat Autònoma del Diari Oficial i de Publicacions (Generalitat de Catalunya) (ed.). Domènec Fita, 50 anys d'art integrat (in Catalan). Girona. ISBN 978-84-3933043-1.
- Fita, Domènec (November 1996). Diputació Provincial de Girona. Estudis, Documentació i Informació (ed.). Fita, art religiós (in Catalan). Girona. ISBN 978-84-8681258-4.
- Fita, Domènec (April 1999). Diputació Provincial de Girona. Estudis, Documentació i Informació (ed.). Escrits (1947-1997) (in Catalan). Girona. ISBN 978-84-8681296-6.
- Fundació Privada Fita, ed. (2001). Fundació Fita (in Catalan and English). Girona. D.L. GI-901-2001.
- Fundació Privada Fita, ed. (June 2008). Vitralls. Obra completa de Domènec Fita (in Catalan and English). Girona. ISBN 978-84-6123462-2.
