= Aida Vila Dilmé =

Convicted Spanish serial killer

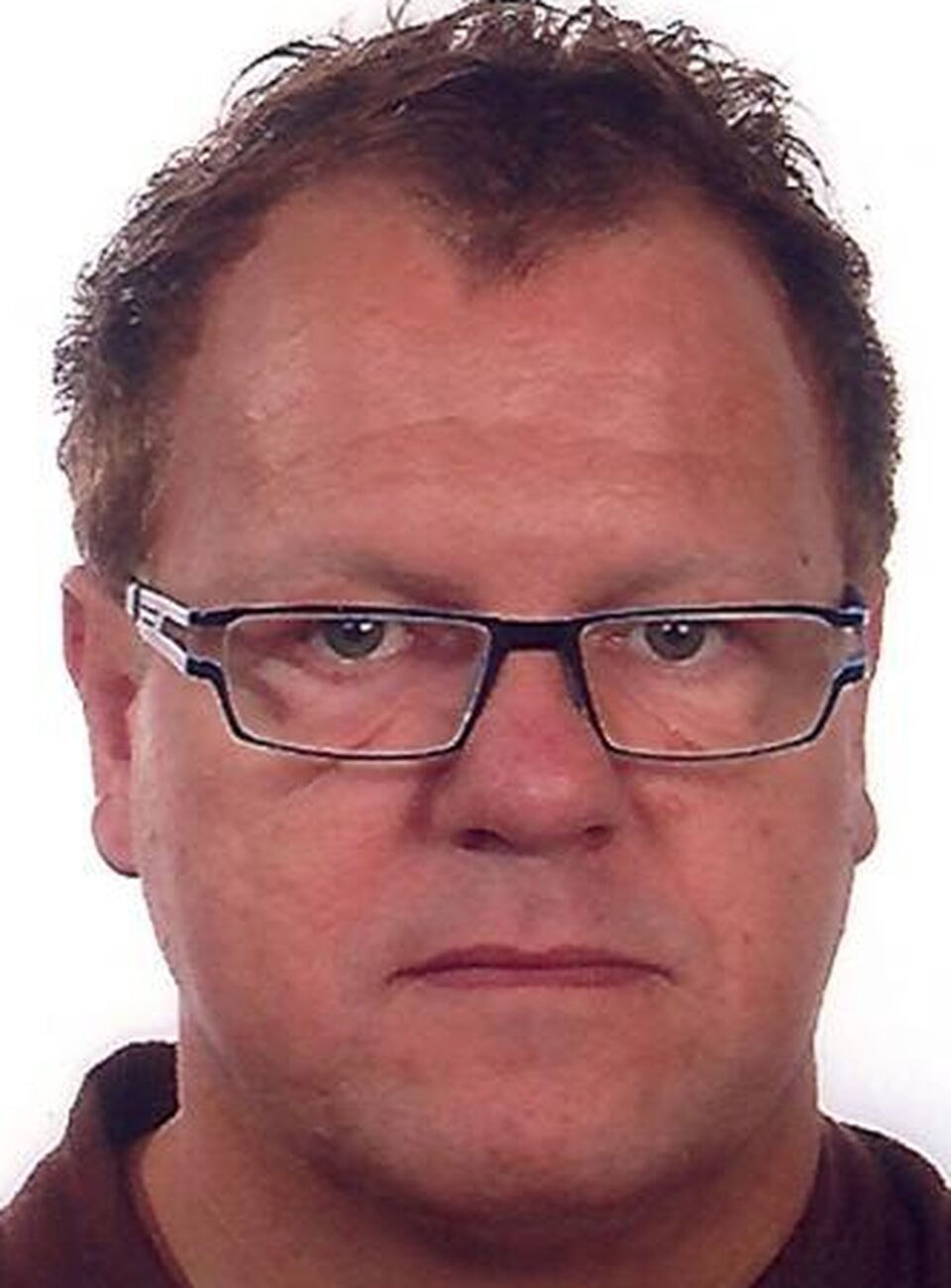
- 2010 mugshot
- Born: Joan Vila Dilmé; 26 September 1965 (age 61); Castellfollit de la Roca, Catalonia, Spain
- Other names: "The Caretaker of Olot" "The Angel of Death"
- Conviction: Murder x11
- Penalty: 127 years and a half imprisonment

Details
- Victims: 11+
- Span of crimes: 2009–2010
- Country: Spain
- State: Catalonia
- Date apprehended: 18 October 2010
- Imprisoned at: Puig de les Basses Penitentiary Center, Figueres

Aida Vila Dilmé (born Joan Vila Dilmé, 26 September 1965), known as The Caretaker of Olot and The Angel of Death, is a Spanish serial killer and nursing assistant. She is responsible for at least 11 murders committed at the Fundació La Caritat in Olot between August 2009 and October 2010, with all her victims being elderly patients aged 80–96.

In 2014, she was found guilty by the Supreme Court of Spain and sentenced to 127 years and a half imprisonment for her crimes.

== Biography ==
=== Childhood and youth ===
Vila was born on 26 September 1965, in Castellfollit de la Roca, Catalonia (Spain), the child of a working class-family of embutido makers. An asocial and insecure individual, Vila avoided interacting with her peers due to worries about her acne, sexuality and the significant tremors in her hands. After her arrest, Vila would acknowledge that throughout her childhood and youth, she felt like "a woman trapped inside a man's body" and that her homosexuality had influenced some of her habits.

=== Adulthood ===
For a while, Vila occupied a small apartment in Castelló d'Empúries, and later opened a hairdressing salon named Tons Cabell-Moda in Figueres, but it quickly shut down, allegedly because her partner had scammed her. She later changed a myriad of jobs in the plastics, textile and skiing industries, and even owned a restaurant, the Casino de Peralada. In addition to this, she also took on training courses in cooking, chiropractic, dressmaking and reflexology.

Eventually, Vila was hired by a small private nursing home in Banyoles, El Mirador de Banyoles, where she worked as a nursing assistant for about eight months. While there, she was regarded very highly by co-workers, who considered her an affectionate and attentive person. For a short period, she also worked at the psychiatric centre in Salt.

=== Psychiatric issues ===
Despite her accomplishments, Vila's mental state gradually worsened, as she had frequent panic attacks, very low self-esteem and was easily influenced by those around her. A heavy smoker, she was diagnosed with obsessive–compulsive disorder, while her tremors and sweating problems grew worse. In addition, she consumed many energy drinks (often mixed with anxiolytics and alcohol), was maniacal on cleanliness and followed a compulsive diet.

At the same time, Vila also began to develop an unprecedented fondness for putting make-up on the recently deceased, which was backed up by writings found on her personal computer's hard drive by the Mossos d'Esquadra. She also had multiple books on paranormal phenomena and death, which she acquired from a local hairdresser friend. After Vila's arrest, she was ordered to undertake a psychiatric evaluation, which determined that she suffered from severe depression.

== Murders ==
=== Initial murders ===
At the beginning of 2006, after having worked in Banyoles and Salt, Vila was hired as a nursing assistant at the Fundació La Caritat nursing home in Olot, next to the Fluvià River. At the time the home was run by psychologist Joan Sala, who saw no harm in the new employee. Vila's shifts were divided between holidays and weekends, and thus, she worked during hours when few staff were present at the facility.

After working there for three and a half years without incident, Vila began killing her patients in August 2009. When committing the killings, she would use two methods: either orally administer a cocktail of barbiturates and drugs mixed with water, or perform intravenous injections with high doses of insulin, which she reserved for diabetic victims. Each death occurred within months of the last one, with several relatives reporting that their loved ones had died an agonizing death, with some of them bleeding from the mouth. The victims, who were predominantly women aged 80–96, were Rosa Barbures Pujol, Francisca Matilde Fiol, Teresa Puig Boixadera, Isidra García Aseijas, Carme Vilanova Viñolas, Lluís Salleras Claret, Joan Canal Julià i Montserrat Canalias Muntada.

=== Later murders ===
From 2006 up until the autumn of 2010, Vila lamented to her colleagues that 'all the old women were dying on [her]'. The rest of the staff agreed that Vila was an efficient and attentive nurse, who put in a lot of effort into explaining the circumstances of death to the deceased patients' relatives. In late September, however, she began to undergo a change of character, becoming more uncompromising and violent. She stated that she was fed up with elderly patients, that she wanted to change jobs, and after the murder of Joan Canal Julià on 19 September 2010, she forced a co-worker to enter the man's room to watch over his body.

The last three murders took place within the span of five days between 12 and 17 October: Sabina Masllorens i Sala on the 12th, Montserrat Guillamet Bartolich on the 16th and Paquita Gironès i Quintana on the 17th. In the commission of these murders, Vila had forced her victims to drink bleach, or injected them with acid or other corrosive substances directly into the mouth. This technique proved to cause excruciating pains to the victim, with the sodium hypochlorite causing several internal burns in the esophagus, mucous membrane and the lungs. At trial, Vila confessed that she had been drinking wine with Coca-Cola for 10 days, and that after killing Masllorens, she had gone home and sat down to watch the TV. Later on, she was invited to join the woman's funeral and the subsequent vigil dedicated to her memory.

=== Murder of Paquita Gironès i Quintana ===
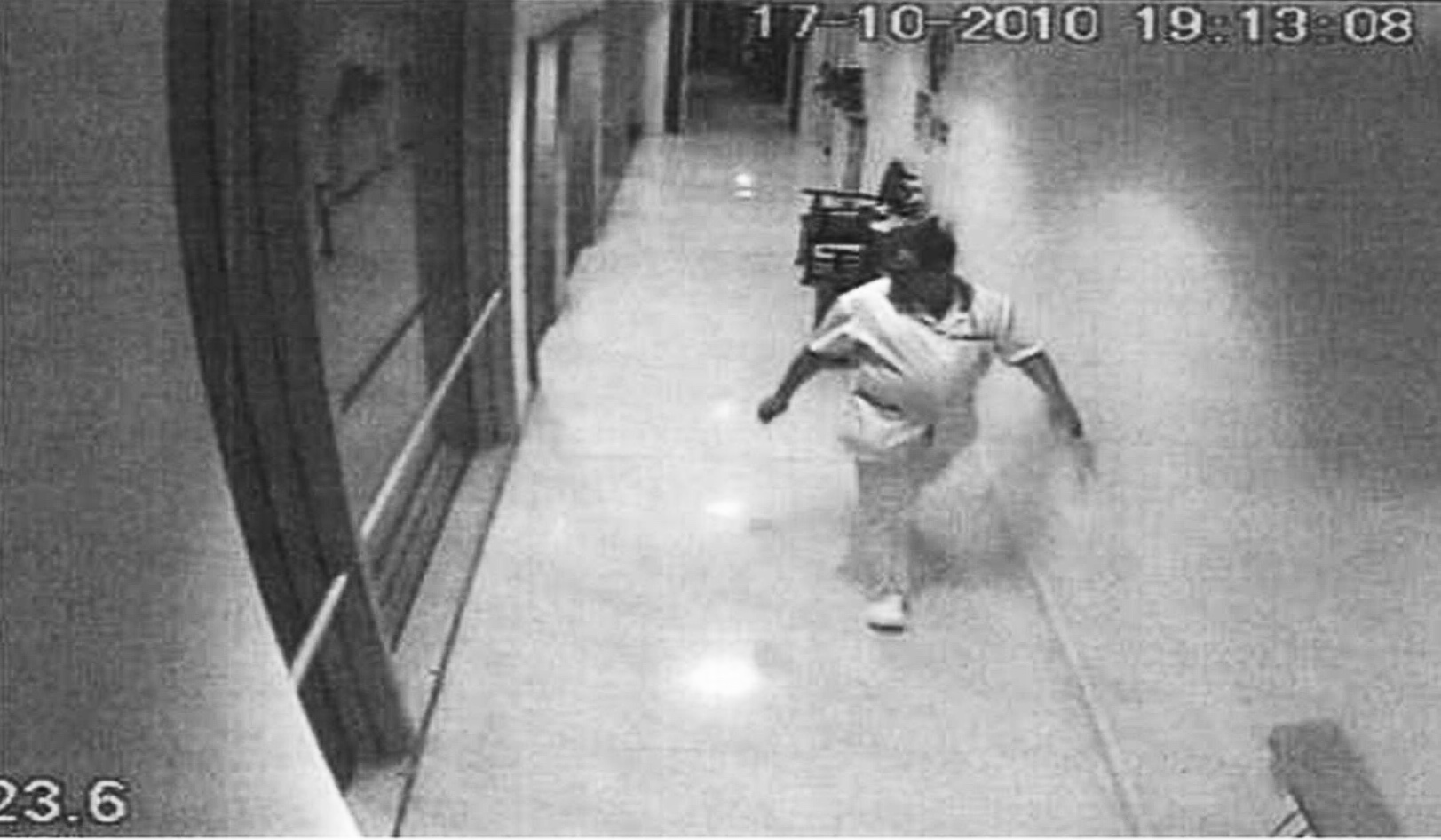
Aida Vila i Dilmé, moments before committing the murder of Gironès i Quintana. This security footage was used by the Mossos d'Esquadra to convince the killer to confess.

Vila's last victim, Paquita Gironès i Quintana, a childless widow suffering from episodes of dementia, was the one who began to arouse suspicion in the facility. She had been interned at La Caritat a few years earlier and developed a very hostile relationship towards Vila, whom she tried to report for abuse for more than a month. Although she referred to her as a "bastard" and claimed that she had slapped her, her accusations were not heeded either by the staff or her niece. During police investigations, it was confirmed that Vila moved Gironès i Quintana in a wheelchair to a ward without any video surveillance, and not long after, the old woman appeared with wounds on her face and breasts.

On the evening of 17 October, and according to Vila's confessions, she had been drinking wine and Coca-Cola all day, and upon hearing Gironès i Quintana coughing, she decided to check upon her. After seeing that she was disoriented and had difficulty breathing, Vila went to the supply closet and filled a syringe with laundry detergent, which she then injected directly into the woman's mouth. Gironès i Quintana began to convulse and expel the liquid, and despite being rushed to the emergency room, she died from her injuries.

=== Arrest ===
Vila would eventually be captured by pure chance, following the forensic autopsy on Gironès i Quintana's corpse. The examining coroner refused to classify this as a natural death and informed the Mossos d'Esquadra on the following day. The team, led by inspector Josep Monteys, concluded that the elderly woman couldn't have been able to ingest the detergent herself and that they might be dealing with a homicide. Shortly thereafter, Mossos agents examined the security feed, noticing that one of the nurses locked himself in the supply closet shortly before Gironès i Quintana was killed. After questioning the rest of the staff at the facility, the police brought in Vila for further interrogation, whereupon she immediately confessed to two of the murders. Subsequently, she was charged with them and remanded to await trial.

== Trial ==
=== Confessions and exhumations ===
In the days following her arrest, when she was brought to justice in the Jutjat d'instrucció of Olot, Vila confessed to killing the last three victims. She claimed that the deaths of the three elderly women made her feel "as if [she] were God", and that the suffering she inflicted on them with the corrosive substances had been only "a grain of sand compared to the fullness of [her] death". Following this statement, the court ordered that she be temporarily detained without bail at the Brians 1 Penitentiary Center in Barcelona.

A month later, Vila voluntarily requested to appear before the court, where she confessed to killing 11 elderly patients during her term at La Caritat. Initially, her lawyer Carles Monguilod, who claimed to have a kindred relationship with her client, tried to justify her client's actions by portraying them as euthanisations to end their suffering. The judge ordered the exhumation of other victims' bodies for an autopsy, given that 56 deaths had occurred since Vila had begun work at La Caritat, of which 27 happened during her shifts (48,2%). Months later, in February 2011, the results of the National Institute of Toxicology and those of the Institute of Forensic Medicine of Catalonia – both requested by the judge – could not clarify whether other victims had been killed with barbiturates or if they had been poisoned at all, given that the bodies had been highly decomposed. Because of this, it was impossible to verify whether there were more victims or not.

=== Trial in the Provincial Court of Girona ===
Vila's trial began at the Provincial Court of Girona on 27 May 2013, with her initially confessing that she didn't want to hurt the old women and was relieved to see them dead. She was faced with the possibility of a sentence of more than 200 years imprisonment for 11 counts of the murder, the last 3 of which were aggravated. The prosecution argued that the killer took advantage of the times when there were few other staff members, and with her victims being unable to defend themselves, she was able to freely kill without any hindrances.

The trial lasted two weeks and involved more than 120 witnesses and experts. Regarding the psychiatric evaluation, the coordinator of the Psychiatric Hospitalization Unit of Catalonia, Álvaro Muro, declared at trial that the defendant was a kind person to those around her, but her loneliness and introversion made her progressively more dangerous. In addition, despite the treatment she had been receiving in recent years, psychiatrists who evaluated Vila stated that she wasn't a psychopath, did not suffer from a personality split and understood the gravity of her actions, which indicated that there should be no mitigating factors in the sentencing.

=== Conviction ===
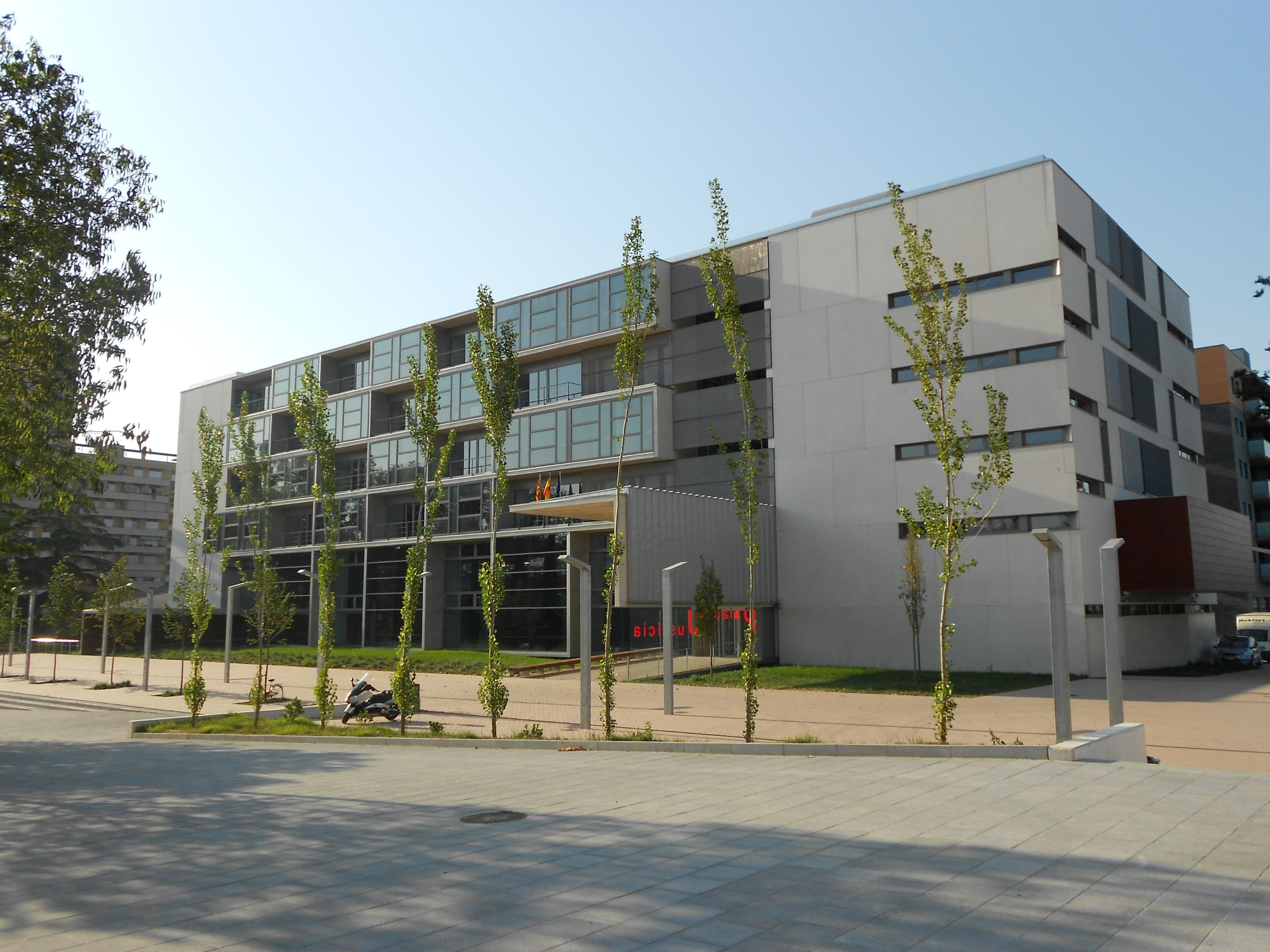
The Provincial Court of Girona, where the trial took place

On 21 June 2013, the jury (consisting of five men and four women) found Aida Vila Dilmé guilty on all counts and recommended a sentence of 127 1/2 years imprisonment for the aggravated murder of the last three victims, and murder with malice aforethought for the remaining ten. In all, of the possible 194 possible years in prison, she received a lesser sentence of 127 due to her confessions, and was prohibited from approaching or contacting any of the victims' family members or relatives for a period of 10 years. While the imposed sentence was 127, the maximum penalty established by criminal law amounted to 40 years imprisonment, which Vila had to serve at the Puig de les Basses Penitentiary Center in Figueres.

In economic terms, the total amount of compensation for the murders amounted to 369,000 euros for Vila from public liability relating to them. Aside from her, the judge also imposed sanctions on La Caritat, based on an article from the Criminal Code of Spain that stated that juridical persons who own an establishment where a worker commits a crime are also liable in civil lawsuits. However, the financial compensation, of between 6,000 and 39,000 euros depending on the relationship of each family member to the victim, was covered by the Zurich Insurance Group.

Vila's defence team filed an appeal to the High Court of Justice of Catalonia, alleging that their client's presumption of innocence had been violated and that she had been sentenced with only her confession as evidence, as by that time, the autopsies on the victims hadn't concluded. The request was denied on 23 February 2014. An appeal was then forwarded to the Supreme Court of Spain, which also rejected the appeal on 10 October of that year.

In April 2026, it was reported that Vila had come out as transgender, changed her name to Aida, and was undergoing hormone therapy. It was also reported that she was awaiting gender reassignment surgery.

== See also ==
- List of serial killers by country

== Bibliography ==
- Bennasar i Llobera, Sebastià (2011). 501 crimes you have to know before you die (in Catalan). Ara Llibres. ISBN 9788492907144.
- Crimen & Investigación (2013). Criminal instinct: The creepy story of the best known serial killers (in Spanish). Penguin Random House Grupo Editorial España. ISBN 9788401342264.
- Guitart Bas, Raimon (2014). Toxic: the enemies of life. El Espejo y la lámpara; vol. 9 (in Catalan). Servei de Publicacions de la Universitat Autònoma de Barcelona. ISBN 9788494190407.
- Crowder, Matías (2022). El celador de Olot [The caretaker of Olot] (in Spanish). Alrevés Editorial (Sin Ficción). ISBN 9788418584770.
