= Antoni Cerdan =

Catalan painter and sculptor (born 1955)

- Born: Antoni Cerdan Moreno; April 25, 1955; Blanes, Catalonia, Spain
- Education: Barcelona School of Fine Arts, Barcelona, Spain
- Known for: Painting, drawing, sculpture, scenography, ...
- Notable work: Sculpture "En un mateix horitzò" at The Pines Promenade. Blanes (1991)
- Movement: Abstract art
- Spouse: Maria Mercè Baltrons Torrent

Antoni Cerdan (born 1955) is a Catalan painter and sculptor.

Cerdan studied drawing and painting with Domènec Fita, an artist from Girona, and later at the Barcelona School of Fine Arts.

His work varies between painting, sculpture and engraving. The sea is a very common theme in his work.

== Permanent work in public places ==
- Sculpture "On the same horizon" at the Blanes promenade.
- Painting on the street at Setè (France).
- Painting The sea and me (El Mar, la mar i jo) at Blanes Teather.
