= Ignasi Mallol i Casanovas =

Spanish painter and educator (1892–1940)

Ignasi Mallol
- Born: Ignasi Mallol i Casanovas; 1892; Tarragona, Spain
- Died: 1940 (aged 47–48); Bogotá, Colombia
- Education: Academia Martínez Altés; Academia Joan Baixas; Escola d'Art Galí

Ignasi Mallol i Casanovas (1892–1940) was a Spanish painter and pedagogue. He played a significant role in safeguarding the artistic and cultural heritage of Tarragona during the Spanish Civil War.

== Biography ==
Trained in Barcelona at the Academias Martínez Altés and Joan Baixas and at the Escola d'Art Galí, Mallol travelled to Paris in 1911 and later ran a private fine-arts academy in Barcelona (1916–1917). Later Casanovas settled in Olot. In 1929 he received the extraordinary prize at the Barcelona Spring Exhibition.

In 1934 he and the sculptor Joan Rebull launched the Taller-Escola de Tarragona, an art training centre created by the Generalitat of Catalonia with the support of the city council. The first course ran from December 1934 to June 1935. Teaching continued until 1937 when the school’s building was destroyed by bombing in October 1938.

During the Civil War he worked on emergency measures to secure collections in Barcelona and Tarragona province, in coordination with the Commission for Artistic Heritage. In early 1939 he went into exile and died in Colombia in 1940.
