= Tura Soler i Pagès =

Tura Soler i Pagès (Santa Pau, 1963) is a Catalan journalist specialized in crime reporting.

She graduated in Information Sciences from the Autonomous University of Barcelona. Since 1986, she has worked at the newspaper El Punt Avui, where she has specialized in crime reporting in Catalonia and serves as head of investigations. Her notable work includes coverage of the Maria Àngels Feliu kidnapping case and Joan Vila, the murderer of the Olot nursing home. She has published several books and has won awards such as the Carles Rahola Journalism Prize. She also collaborates with the program Crims, by Carles Porta, and in the 1980s, she contributed to El País.

Tura Soler has also become a fictional character in several crime novels, where she plays the role of an investigative journalist. She appears in works such as Ginesta pels morts, by Agustí Vehí; En el umbral de la muerte, by Eduard Pascual; L’estranya desaparició de Laura, by Josep Torrent; and Plagues i volcans, by Miquel Casas.

== Works ==
- Estampes del segrest d'Olot (El Punt, 1995) (co-authored with Susana Alsina Coll and Fidel Bales Juanola) ISBN 9788460524410
- El volcà a la taula: els fesols de Santa Pau (El Medol, 2001) (co-authored with Salvador Garcia-Arbós) ISBN 9788495559166
- Terra de crims (Editorial Xandri, 2017) (co-author)
- El que m’han ensenyat els morts per entendre millor la vida, memòries del forense Narcís Bardalet ISBN 9788494941702
- El pantà maleït (La Campana, 2021) ISBN 9788418226212
- Rigor mortis (La Campana, 2023)

== Awards and Recognitions ==
- 2013 and 2019 – Carles Rahola Journalism Prize
- 2020 – Josep Maria Planes Prize
- 2022 – Fulla Negra Prize
