= Francesc Arnau =

Spanish footballer (1975–2021)

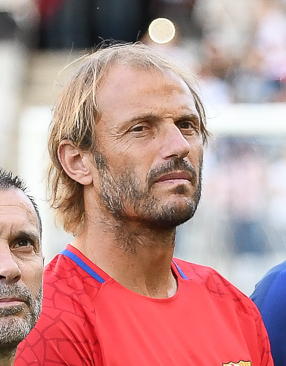
- Arnau in 2018

Personal information
- Full name: Francesc Xavier Arnau Grabalosa
- Date of birth: 23 March 1975
- Place of birth: Les Planes, Spain
- Date of death: 22 May 2021 (aged 46)
- Place of death: Oviedo, Spain
- Height: 1.86 m (6 ft 1 in)
- Position: Goalkeeper

Youth career
- 1990–1995: Barcelona

Senior career*
Years	Team	Apps	(Gls)
1995–1999	Barcelona B	119	(0)
1996–2001	Barcelona	24	(0)
2001–2011	Málaga	131	(0)
Total		274	(0)

International career
1996–1998	Spain U21	13	(0)
1997	Spain U23	2	(0)
- * Club domestic league appearances and goals

Francesc Xavier Arnau Grabalosa (23 March 1975 – 22 May 2021) was a Spanish footballer who played as a goalkeeper.

In a 16-year professional career he played for Barcelona and Málaga, appearing in 126 La Liga games over the course of 12 seasons. He later worked as a sporting director.

== Club career ==
=== Barcelona ===
Born in Les Planes d'Hostoles, Girona, Catalonia, Arnau was a youth graduate from La Liga powerhouse Barcelona. He made his first-team debut in 1996–97, in a 3–3 home draw against Atlético Madrid on 9 November 1996.

Arnau was second choice to Vítor Baía, Ruud Hesp and Pepe Reina for several seasons, while also registered with the reserves.

=== Málaga ===
For the 2001–02 campaign, Arnau moved to Málaga for € 2.1 million, also playing second-fiddle until the departure of Pedro Contreras to Real Betis in 2003. He would eventually become team captain, but lost his job in 2007–08 in the Segunda División, to Iñaki Goitia.

Goitia was sold also to Betis in summer 2009, but Gustavo Munúa and Roberto Santamaría were also acquired, so Arnau was demoted to as low as third choice. He eventually finished as backup to the Uruguayan, without making one single competitive appearance.

After Munúa's departure, Arnau played the first game of the 2010–11 season – a 3–1 home loss against Valencia – as Rodrigo Galatto was not yet eligible. He continued appearing regularly for the side in the following weeks after the Brazilian performed poorly and another new signing, Rubén, went down with an injury.

Arnau played his last match as a professional on 21 May 2011, coming on as a substitute for Willy Caballero in the last minutes of a 3–1 home defeat to his first club Barcelona, with Málaga finally retaining its top-flight status.

== International career ==
Arnau appeared for Spain at the 1998 UEFA European Under-21 Championship, being named the tournament's MVP as the country emerged victorious.

== Post-retirement ==
After retiring at the age of 36, Arnau continued working with his last club as a youth coach, alongside former teammate Salva. The former became Málaga's new director of football on 15 December 2015, in replacement of Armando Husillos. In October 2017, after a poor start to the season saw the side placed last in the top tier, he was dismissed and replaced by his predecessor.

Arnau signed with Real Oviedo on 3 December 2019 in the same capacity, on a deal until June 2022.

== Death ==
On 22 May 2021, Arnau was found dead in Oviedo's railway station of La Corredoria, aged 46. It was later revealed that he committed suicide.

== Career statistics ==
Appearances and goals by club, season and competition
Club	Season	League			National cup		Europe		Other		Total	
Club	Season	Division	Apps	Goals	Apps	Goals	Apps	Goals	Apps	Goals	Apps	Goals
Barcelona B	1995–96	Segunda División	36	0	—		—		—		36	0
Barcelona B	1996–97	Segunda División	34	0	—		—		—		34	0
Barcelona B	1997–98	Segunda División B	34	0	—		—		4	0	38	0
Barcelona B	1998–99	Segunda División	15	0	—		—		—		15	0
Barcelona B	Total		119	0	—		—		4	0	123	0
Barcelona	1995–96	La Liga	0	0	0	0	0	0	—		0	0
Barcelona	1996–97	La Liga	1	0	0	0	0	0	—		1	0
Barcelona	1997–98	La Liga	0	0	0	0	0	0	0	0	0	0
Barcelona	1998–99	La Liga	1	0	1	0	0	0	—		2	0
Barcelona	1999–2000	La Liga	16	0	1	0	4	0	0	0	21	0
Barcelona	2000–01	La Liga	6	0	0	0	2	0	—		8	0
Barcelona	Total		24	0	2	0	6	0	0	0	32	0
Málaga	2001–02	La Liga	0	0	0	0	—		—		0	0
Málaga	2002–03	La Liga	3	0	0	0	—		—		3	0
Málaga	2003–04	La Liga	21	0	1	0	—		—		22	0
Málaga	2004–05	La Liga	20	0	1	0	—		—		21	0
Málaga	2005–06	La Liga	36	0	0	0	—		—		36	0
Málaga	2006–07	Segunda División	27	0	1	0	—		—		28	0
Málaga	2007–08	Segunda División	2	0	4	0	—		—		6	0
Málaga	2008–09	La Liga	13	0	0	0	—		—		13	0
Málaga	2009–10	La Liga	0	0	0	0	—		—		0	0
Málaga	2010–11	La Liga	9	0	2	0	—		—		11	0
Málaga	Total		131	0	9	0	—		—		140	0
Career total			274	0	11	0	6	0	4	0	295	0

== Honours ==
Barcelona

- La Liga: 1998–99

Spain U21

- UEFA European Under-21 Championship: 1998

== See also ==
- Pelayo Novo
