= Les Planes d'Hostoles =

- Municipality
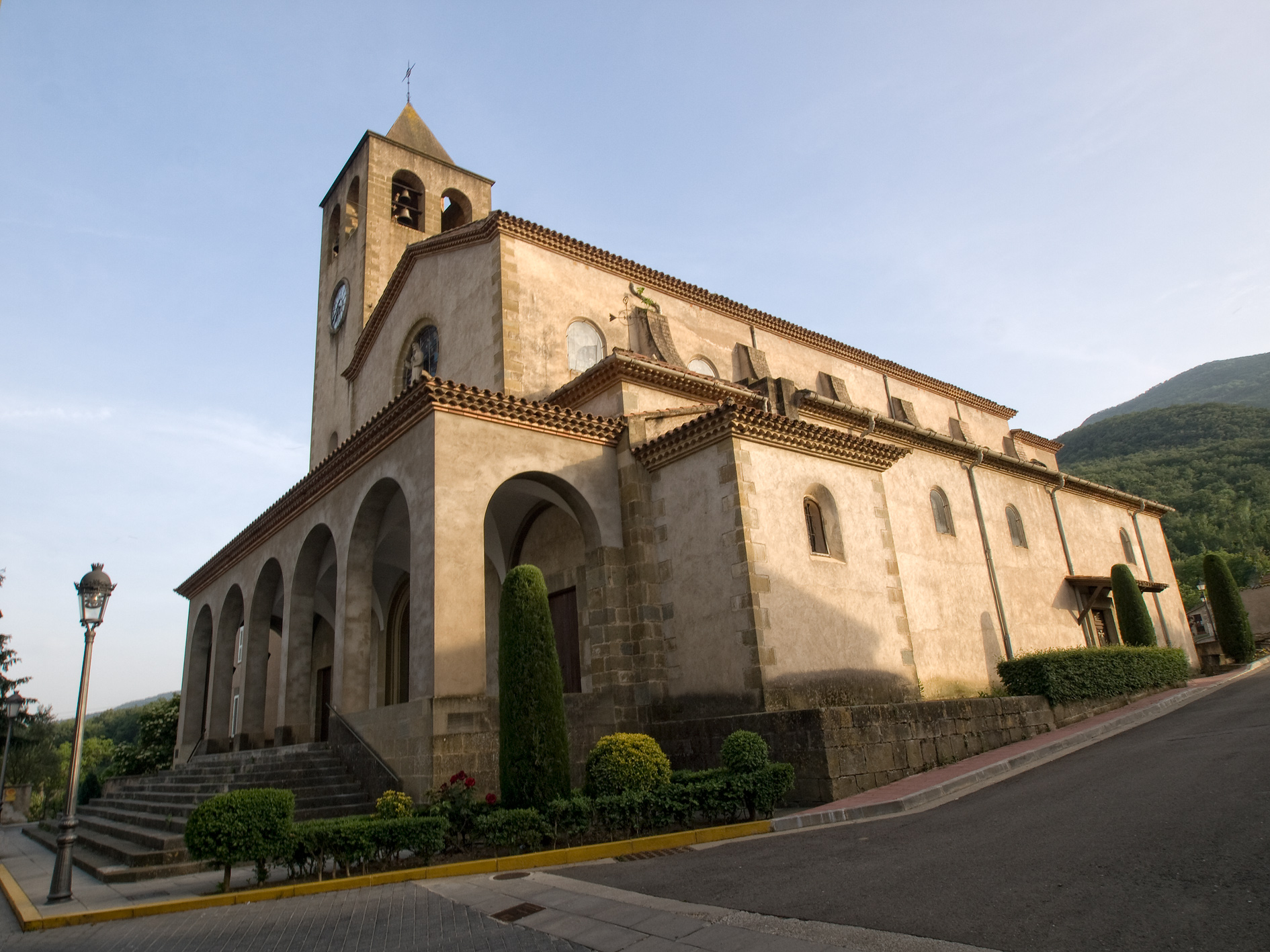
- St. Christopher's parish church

- Location in Catalonia Les Planes d'Hostoles (Spain)
- Coordinates: 42°3′22″N 2°32′23″E
- Country: Spain
- Community: Catalonia
- Province: Girona
- Comarca: Garrotxa

Government
  - Mayor: Eduard Llorà Cullet (2015)

Area
  - Total: 37.5 km^{2} (14.5 sq mi)

Population (2025-01-01)
  - Total: 1,746
  - Density: 46.6/km^{2} (121/sq mi)
- Website: www.lesplanes.cat

Les Planes d'Hostoles (Catalan pronunciation: [ləs ˈplanəz ðusˈtɔləs]) is a village and municipality in the province of Girona and autonomous community of Catalonia, Spain. The municipality covers an area of 37.51 square kilometres (14.48 sq mi) and the population in 2014 was 1,694.

In the 18th century, there were disputes between the Encies over who was responsible for rebuilding the area of Mal Pas, which was part of the communication route along the road. Discussions took place between the different aldermen, along with testimonies from the residents of the two towns and from people who had worked there, as they were required to pay one parish or another, or a rodalia, according to ancient custom. In this area, the trade of goods predominated, and there were also fatalities.

From 1900, Les Planes d'Hostoles was linked to Girona by the narrow gauge Olot–Girona railway, which was extended to Sant Feliu de Pallerols in 1902 and Olot in 1911. The line closed in 1969 and has since been converted into a greenway.

There are many waterfalls in the area and one hotel in town.

== Notable residents ==
- Francesc Arnau (1975–2021), footballer
- Carla Simón (1986–), filmmaker
