= La Sardana de l'alcalde =

Traditional dance of Amer, town in Catalonia

The Sardana de l'Alcalde (lit. 'the Mayor's Sardana') is a traditional dance from the town of Amer, Girona, in the north of the La Selva region of Catalonia, Spain. It is a dance very similar to other sardanes, but it has a fundamental characteristic that makes it peculiar: it is always danced openly, without closing the circle. The sardana had always been danced for the town's main festival, on August 15, although due to logistical circumstances, it is now danced on the night of the 16th. Oral histories attest to the existence of this dance since the end of the 19th century, while research by Josep Puigdemont, former mayor of Amer and expert on the tradition, point to a contrapàs (lit. 'back step'; a forerunner to the sardana) that probably emerged at the end of the 18th century.

The tradition of the Sardana del Alcalde suffered an interruption. Dancing probably stopped around 1910, due to political reasons. According to the memory of Josep Puigdemont and Oliveras's mother, it seems that the enmity between two sides, fascist and anti-fascist – the ruling party and the opposition – reached a point that the couples on each side booed each other, leading to fisticuffs. From then on it was thought appropriate to stop the dancing.

It was not resumed until 1949, in the midst of the Franco regime. In that year the Millennium of the consecration of its Temple of Santa María, formerly the Monastery of the Order of Sant Benet, was celebrated and great festivities were held. At that moment a document by Joan Porcioles, the town's notary, was found, who left in writing a detailed explanation of the complete ceremonial of the dance. A councilor from the fascist party of Amer, named Narcís Solergastó, proposed that the Mayor's Sardana, which the older people still remembered, be revived; his proposal was accepted and included in the celebrations. The recovery was carried out following the instructions in the Porcioles document.

The tradition was that the mayor had to choose the piece that would be danced. As the mayor of the time, Narcís Junquera y Rigau, did not understand much about sardanas, the choice was made by a councilor named Salvador Oliveras i Galceran, and he chose the sardana Conxita encisera, by Pere Mercader y Andrés, because it was a very popular at the time and also to honor his wife, Conxita. Another important event occurred in the Millennium celebrations. On November 9, 1949, the sardana "Millennium Festival" by Joan Fontàs i Casas, Amer composer, premiered. This sardana became very popular in the town. In fact, Josep Puigdemont himself wrote a lyric, in such a way that the following year, in 1950, Mayor Junquera chose this sardana as a piece to be danced for the festival of the Mother of God in August.

Since this mayor governed until 1975, and always chose the same sardana, a tradition was formed that was continued by the following mayors. As Joan Fontàs contracted tuberculosis upon returning from military service, he could only live off the copyright of his compositions. When he died, his relatives threw out all of his belongings. Pere Buxó i Domènech, a well-known musician and composer from Amer, upon seeing it, collected the musical part. It is now incorporated into the Buxó Fund.

The fact that it supported Fontàs also contributed to Josep Puigdemont (who was the first mayor in democracy) continuing to choose this sardana.

Today the tradition is still alive, and there has been no change as far as the repertoire is concerned. The tradition of the Amer open sardana is unique in all Catalonia.

== See also ==
- Circle dance – Style of dance done in a circle with rhythm instruments and singing
