= Volcà del Montsacopa =

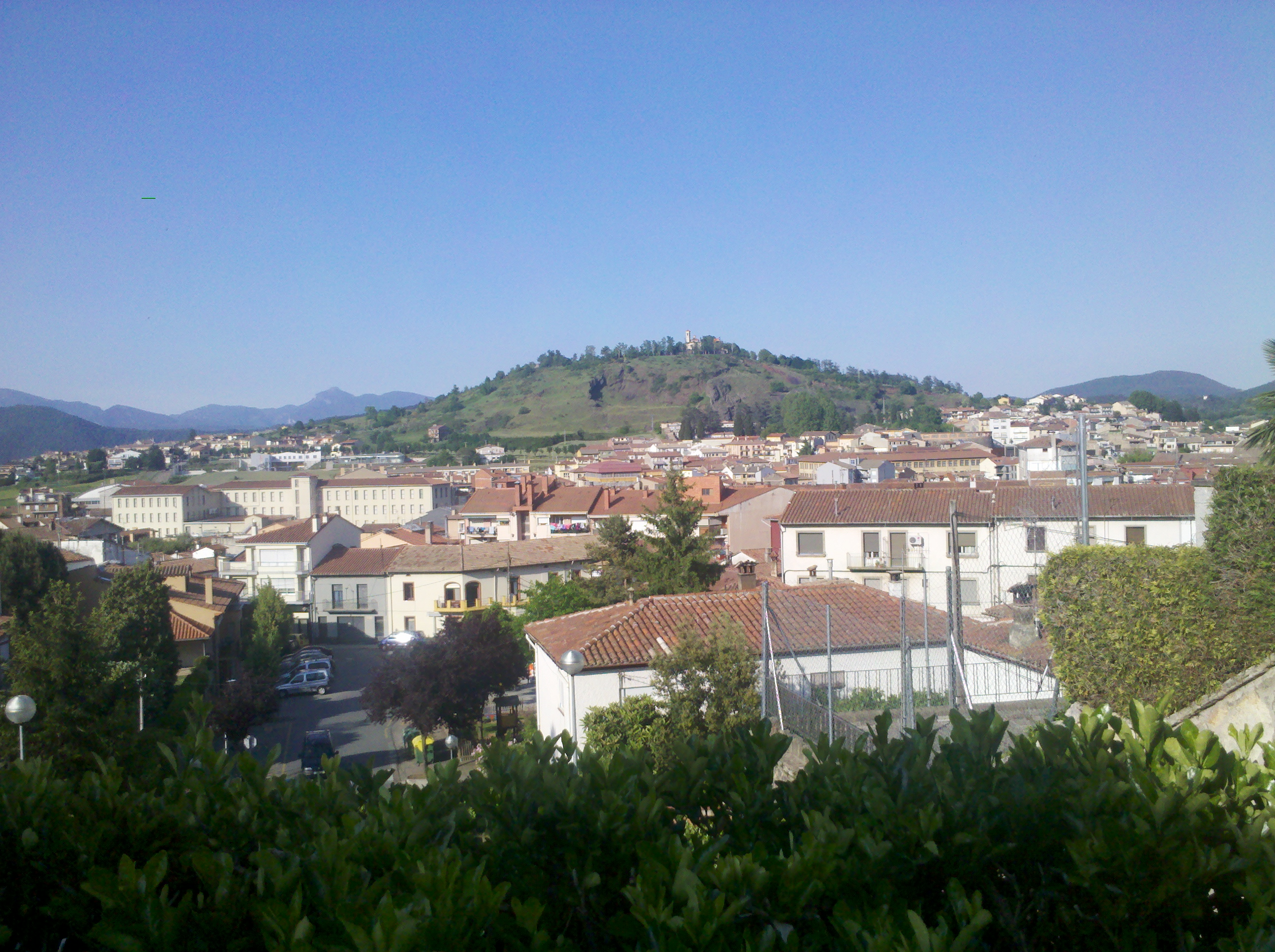

Highest point
- Elevation: 510 m (1,670 ft)
- Coordinates: 42°11′14″N 2°29′19″E

Geography
- Location within Spain
- Location: Catalonia, Spain
- Parent range: Pyrenees

Climbing
- Easiest route: easy hike

Volcà del Montsacopa is an extinct volcano in the Zona Volcànica de la Garrotxa Natural Park, situated in Olot, Catalunya, Spain.

The volcano has been extinct for about 100,000 years.

On top of the crater is the hermitage of Sant Francesc, built in the 17th century.

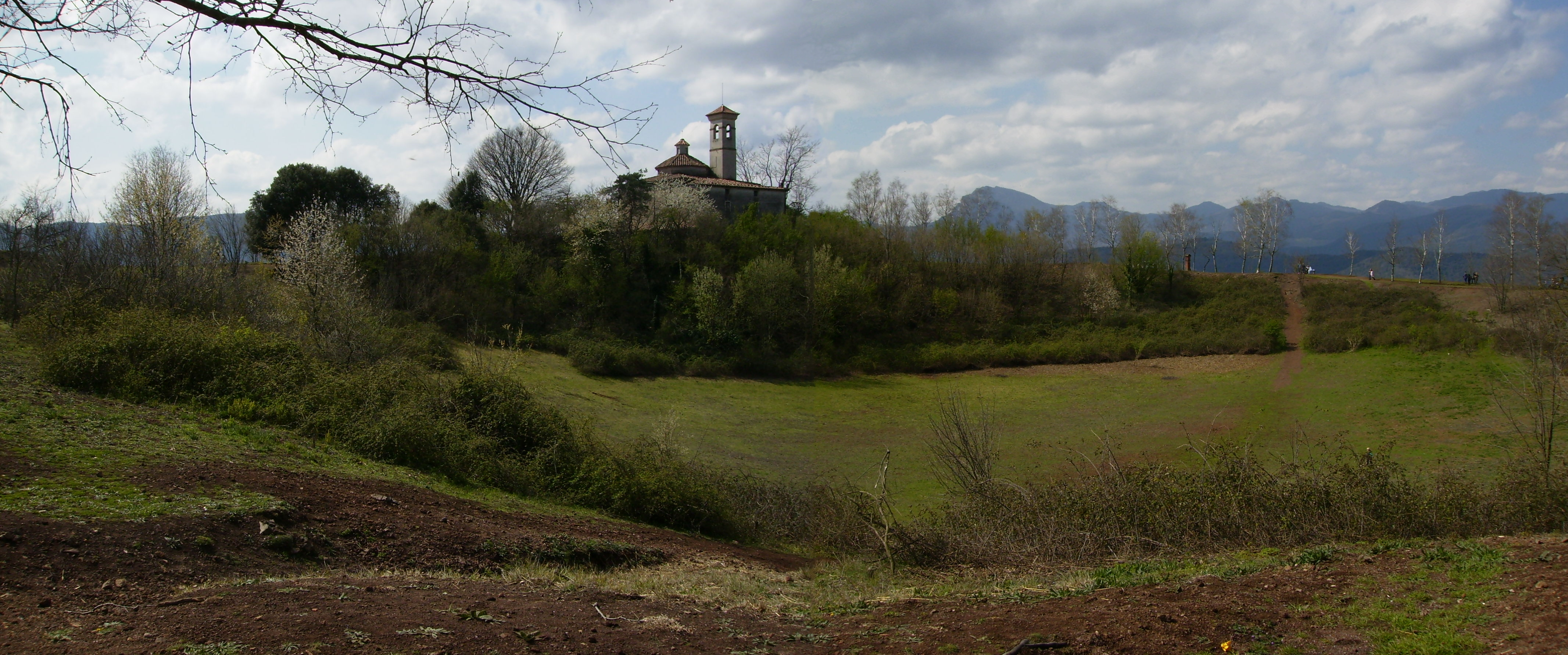
Crater of the Montsacopa volcano in Olot
