= Olot–Girona railway =

Former narrow gauge railway line in Catalonia, Spain

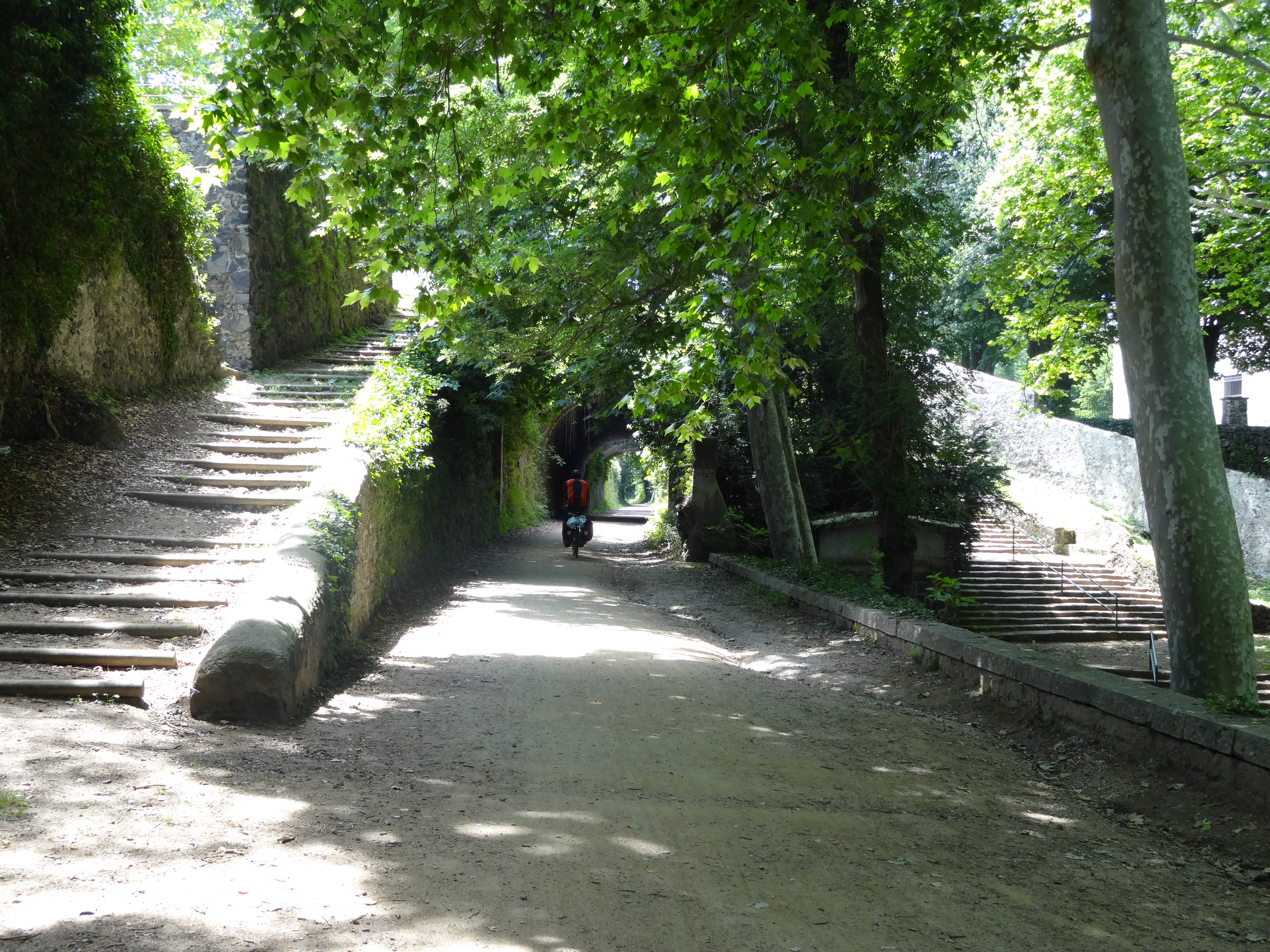

Overview
- Status: Dismantled
- Locale: Province of Girona, Catalonia, Spain

History
- Opened: 1895
- Closed: 1969

Technical
- Line length: 54.8 kilometres (34.1 mi)
- Num of tracks: 1
- Track gauge: 1,000 mm (3 ft 3 3/8 in) metre gauge

The Olot to Girona Railway was a 1,000 mm (3 ft 3 3/8 in) gauge railway line that operated over 54.8 kilometres (34.1 mi) of track between Olot and Girona, in the province of Girona, Catalonia, Spain. The line crosses the Zona Volcànica de la Garrotxa Natural Park and follows the valleys of the Fluvià, Brugent and Ter rivers. It opened in stages from 1895 to 1911, and closed in 1969.

The first section of the line, which connected Salt, in the western suburbs of Girona, to Amer opened in 1895. In 1898, the short section from Girona's main line railway station to Salt opened. In 1900, the section from Amer to les Planes d'Hostoles opened. In 1902, the line was extended to Sant Feliu de Pallerols. In 1911, the final extension to Olot opened.

The line suffered financial and physical losses during the Spanish Civil War. Republican troops blew up many of the bridges as they retreated and a large number of locomotives and rolling stock were lost. Flooding in 1940 also caused further damage to the tracks. In 1963 the railway was taken over by the state-owned Ferrocarriles de Vía Estrecha (FEVE), but it was closed in July, 1969.

The line has been converted into a greenway linking Olot and Girona. Many of the line's tunnels and bridges still exist, as do several station buildings. Most notably, the former station building at Girona still stands, adjacent to the main line railway station, and is included in the Inventory of the Architectural Heritage of Catalonia.
