= Escola d'Art i Superior de Disseny d'Olot =

Art school in Olot, Spain

Coordinates: 42°11′0.72″N 2°29′31.80″E

- Escola d'Art i Superior de Disseny d'Olot
- Type: Public Art school / Design school
- Established: 1 July 1783
- Affiliations: Generalitat de Catalunya, ESDAP
- Location: Olot, Girona, Catalonia, Spain
- Website: www.escolartolot.cat

Escola d'Art i Superior de Disseny d'Olot is the main Design and Arts & Crafts school of the region of Girona (Catalonia, Spain). Since its foundation, it has maintained an active participation in the social, educational, economic and cultural life. The school is in Olot, a city with a population of over 34,000 inhabitants.

== History ==
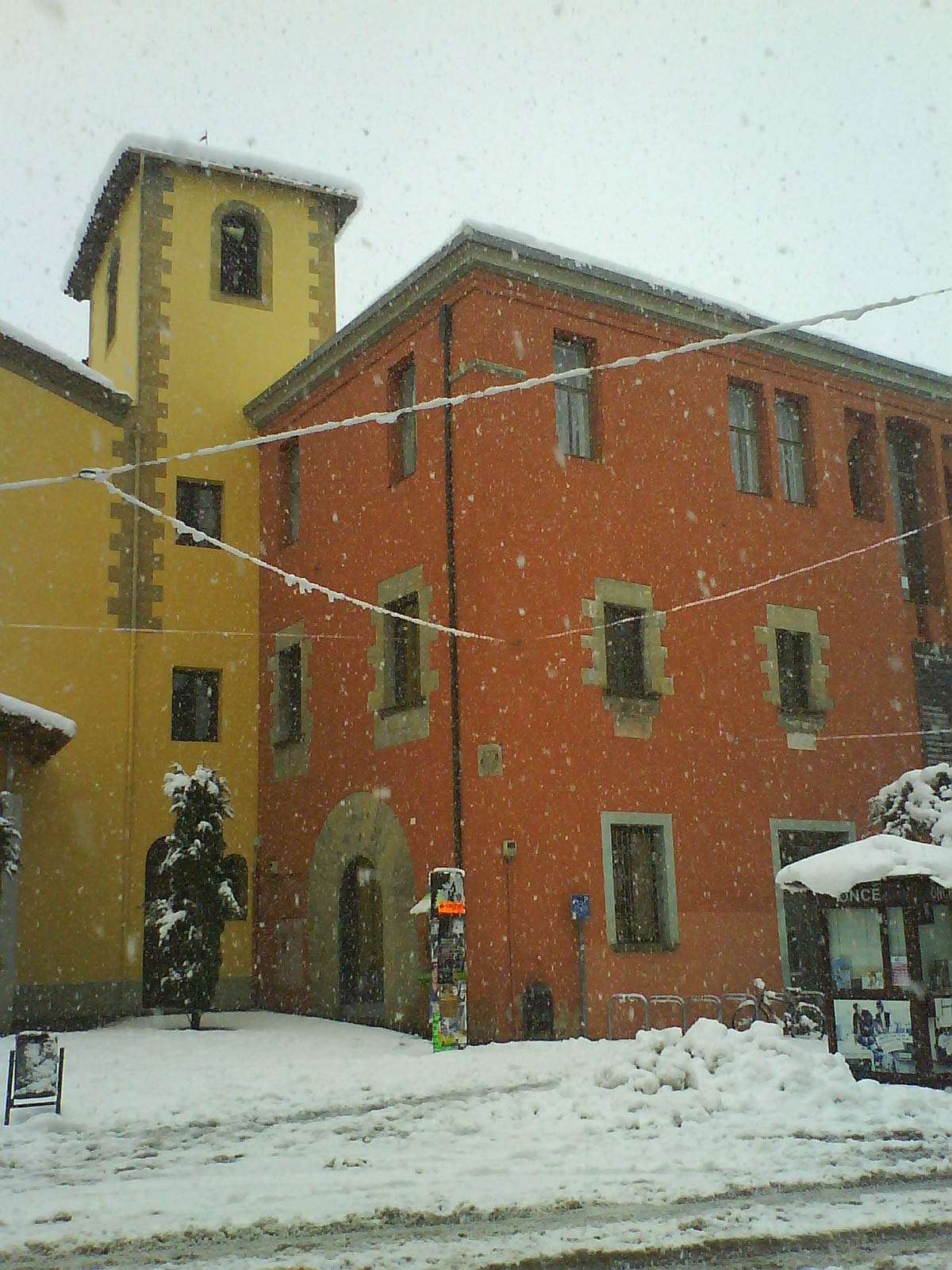
School's building

The School was founded as Fine Arts School on 1 July 1783 by Bishop Tomas Lorenzana. In 1891 was renamed as Minor Fine Arts' School, and during the period 1934–1938 was designed as Landscape's School, depending on the Generalitat de Catalunya.

During the 1986–87 academic year the official teaching of applied arts and crafts began, according to the official plan for 1963 schools; the school at this time depended on Olot's City Council.

On 20 June 1990 the school became part of the Catalonia official network of art schools with the name of Escola d'Arts Applicades i Oficis Artístics d'Olot; human resources and management switched to the Generalitat de Catalunya.

Since the 2003–2004 academic year the school has become Escola d'Art i Superior de Disseny d'Olot, by completing the training with a Bachelor in Interior Design. Since the 2007–08 academic year the school also teaches a Bachelor of Graphic Design. Since 2010–11 it became one of seven ESDAP (Escola Superior de Disseny i Arts Plàstiques) and began to teach undergraduate Design (adapted to the European Higher Education Area).

== Location ==
The institution is at the "Claustres del Carme" building, the Carmelite Cloisters, which date back to the Renaissance.
