= Sant Feliu de Pallerols =

- Municipality
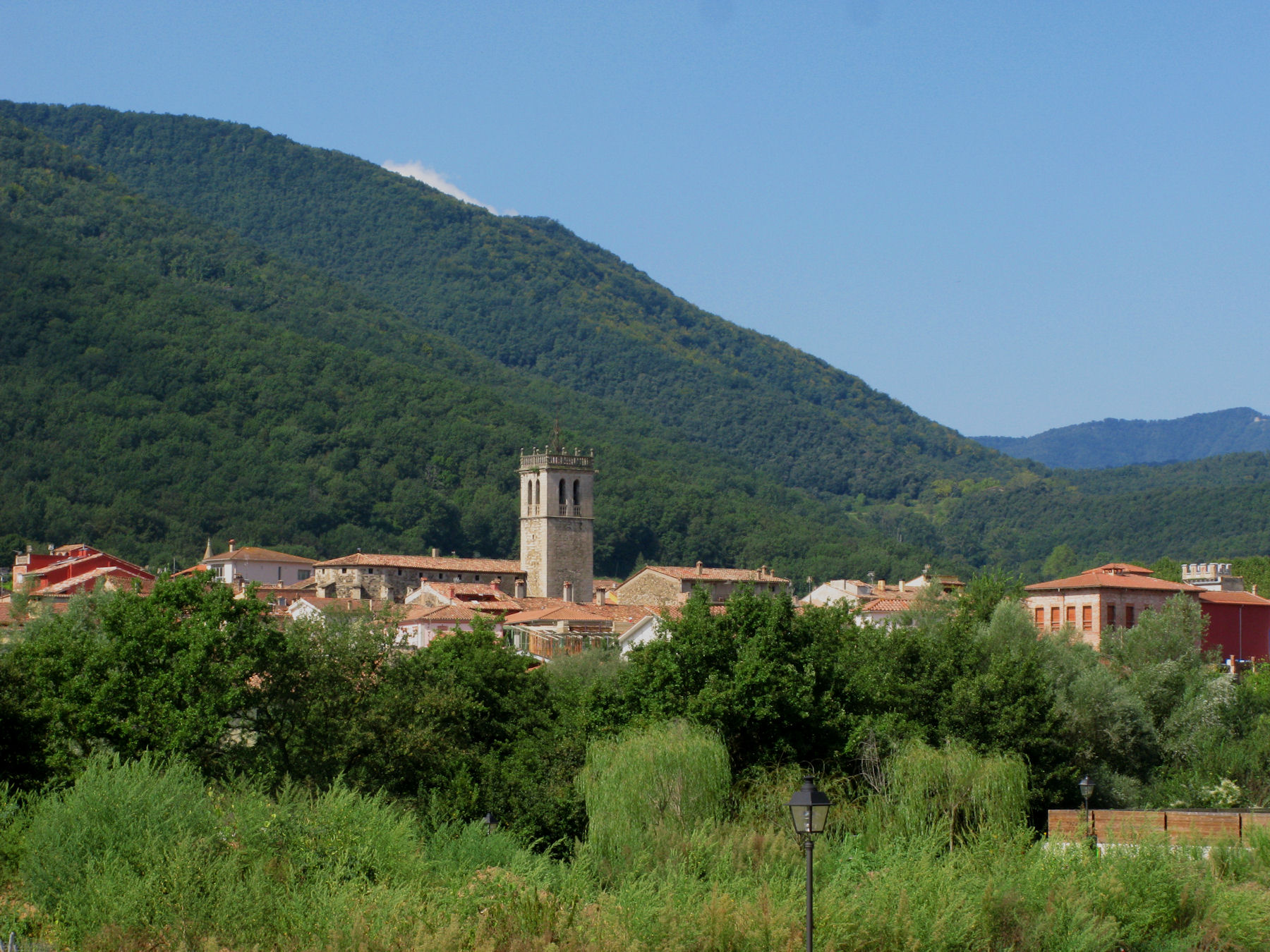

- Flag Coat of arms

- Location in Catalonia Sant Feliu de Pallerols (Spain)
- Coordinates: 42°4′36″N 2°30′29″E
- Country: Spain
- Community: Catalonia
- Province: Girona
- Comarca: Garrotxa

Government
  - Mayor: Joan Casas Carreras (2015)

Area
  - Total: 34.9 km^{2} (13.5 sq mi)

Population (2025-01-01)
  - Total: 1,700
  - Density: 49/km^{2} (130/sq mi)
- Website: santfeliudepallerols.cat

Sant Feliu de Pallerols (Catalan pronunciation: [ˈsaɱ fəˈliw ðə pəʎəˈɾɔls]) is a village in the province of Girona and autonomous community of Catalonia, Spain. The municipality covers an area of 34.8 square kilometres (13.4 sq mi) and the population in 2014 was 1,353.

From 1902, Sant Feliu de Pallerols was linked to Girona by the narrow gauge Olot–Girona railway, which was extended to Olot in 1911. The line closed in 1969 and has since been converted into a greenway.

The area is notable for its many waterfalls. The natural river pools are called Boix, Valls and La Mola.
