= Olot =

- Municipality
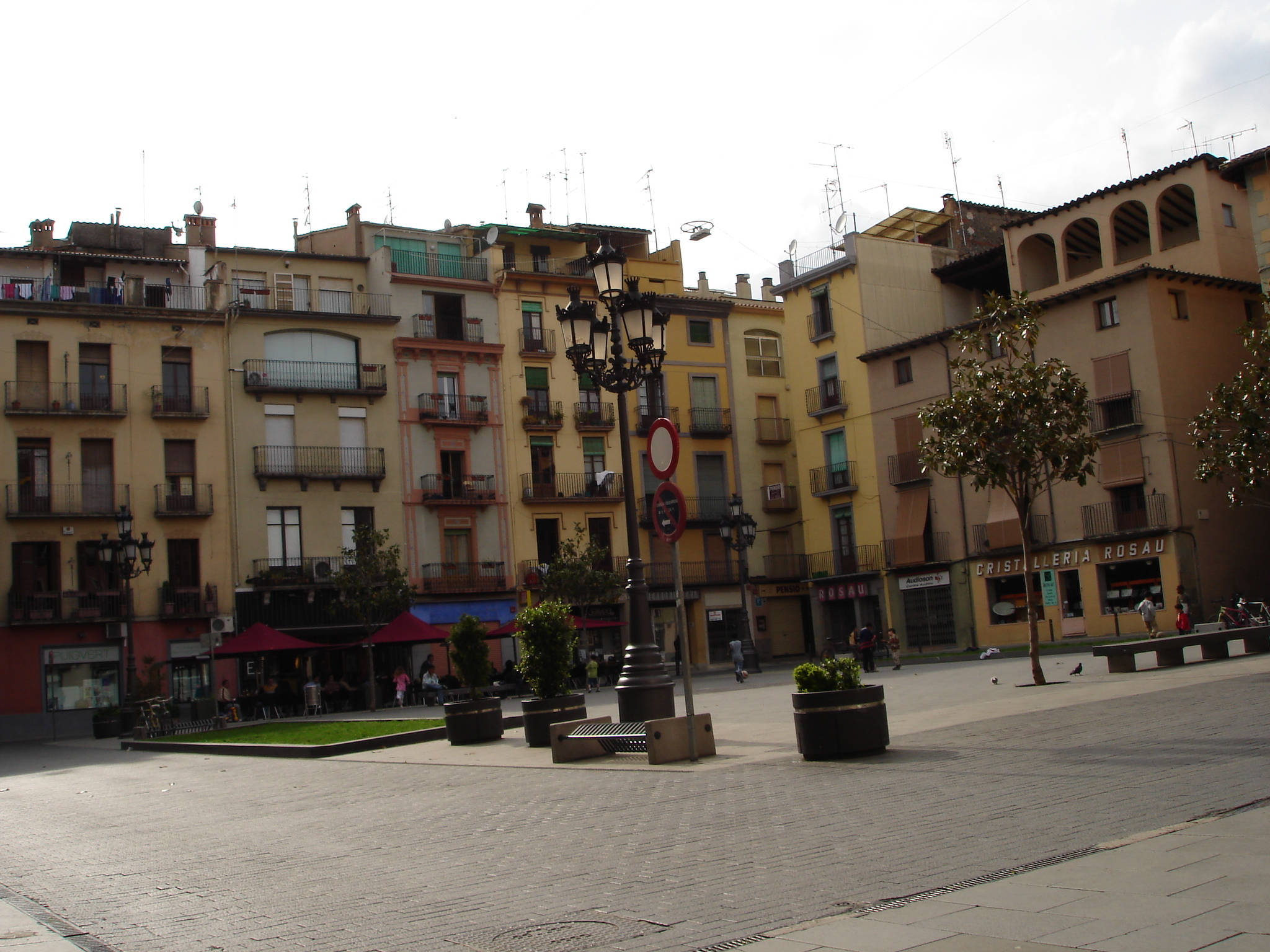
- The Plaça Major of Olot

- Flag Coat of arms
- Nickname: La ciutat dels volcans (The city of the volcanoes)
- Location in Catalonia Olot (Spain)
- Coordinates: 42°11′N 2°29′E
- Country: Spain
- Community: Catalonia
- Province: Girona
- Comarca: Garrotxa

Government
  - Mayor: Pep Berga Vayreda (2019) (JxCat)

Area
  - Total: 29.0 km^{2} (11.2 sq mi)
- Elevation: 443 m (1,453 ft)

Population (2025-01-01)
  - Total: 39,519
  - Density: 1,360/km^{2} (3,530/sq mi)
- Postal code: 17800
- Climate: Cfb
- Website: www.olot.cat

Olot (Catalan: [uˈlɔt]; Spanish: [oˈlot]) is the capital city of the comarca of Garrotxa, in the Province of Girona, Catalonia, Spain. The city is known for its natural landscape, including four volcanoes scattered around the city center. The municipality is part of the Zona Volcànica de la Garrotxa Natural Park. Olot is also well known for its cultural activity, with historical art movements like Olot school or factories of religious imagery, which contributed to the location in the city of the main Design and Arts & Crafts school of the province of Girona, the Escola d'Art i Superior de Disseny d'Olot.

Between 1911 and 1969, Olot was linked to Girona by the narrow gauge Olot–Girona railway. The line has since been converted into a greenway.

== Etymology ==
The etymology of Olot is not clear and there are several hypotheses. According to the Crònica Universal de Catalunya, Olot was founded by Ulo, former king of the dynasty of Atlanteans, (then called Siculus), with the name of Ulot. Another theory, more widespread, is that the name comes from ala (wing in Catalan), because the city has been documented with the names Aulot and Alot. For this reason, the coat of arms of Olot has a wing in reference to the name of the city.

== Geography ==
The municipality 29, 03 km^{2} and includes the city of Olot and the town of Batet de la Serra (annexed in 1971). The term is located at 443.4 meters above sea level and is approximately 50 km from Girona, the capital of the province of the same name. It is bordered by Sant Joan les Fonts (north east), Santa Pau (south east), Les Preses (south west), Riudaura (west) and La Vall de Bianya (north west).

The municipality consists of the original city of Olot and old towns and neighbourhoods that now form a conurbation around the city (Sant Roc d'Olot, Sant Cristòfol de les Fonts, Sant Andreu del Coll, Closells) apart from different urbanisations (les Fonts, Mas Bernat, les Planoles, etc.) and the old municipality of Batet de la Serra, which was independent until 1971.

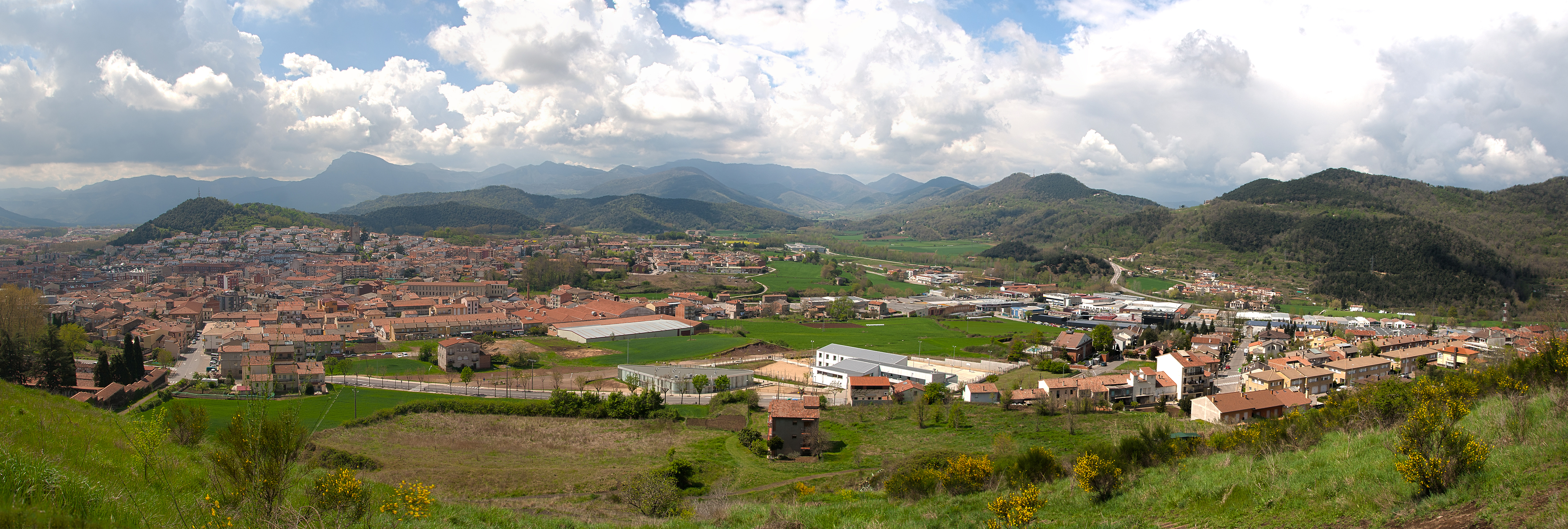
Panorama of Olot from Montsacopa volcano

== Geography and climate ==
Olot is located on a plain surrounded by the mountain ranges of Valentí, Aiguanegra, the plateau of Batet, Marboleny and Sant Valentí de la Pinya. The plain is crossed by the Fluvià river and the Riudaura stream. There are four volcanoes in the city of Olot, called Montolivet, Montsacopa, Garrinada and Bisaroques.

The Fluvià discharges 1.07 m^{3}/s into the Mediterranean Sea.

The area of Garrotxa is generally more humid than neighbouring regions. The annual rainfall is around 1000 mm. Popularly, it is said that "if it isn't raining in Olot, it isn't raining anywhere" (Si no plou a Olot, no plou enlloc in Catalan). The minimum in Olot in January is around 0 °C, and the maximum in August is around 28 °C.

== Population ==
Population census

Year	Pop.	±% p.a.
1718	2,627	—
1787	9,146	+1.82%
1860	10,262	+0.16%
1900	7,938	−0.64%
1930	11,615	+1.28%
1960	17,185	+1.31%
1981	24,892	+1.78%

Year	Pop.	±% p.a.
1991	26,713	+0.71%
1996	27,482	+0.57%
1998	27,644	+0.29%
1999	27,814	+0.61%
2000	27,967	+0.55%
2001	28,339	+1.33%
2002	28,890	+1.94%

Year	Pop.	±% p.a.
2003	29,546	+2.27%
2004	30,306	+2.57%
2005	31,271	+3.18%
2006	31,932	+2.11%
2007	32,337	+1.27%
2008	32,903	+1.75%
2009	33,524	+1.89%

Year	Pop.	±% p.a.
2010	33,589	+0.19%
2011	33,725	+0.40%
2012	33,813	+0.26%
2013	33,981	+0.50%
2014	33,913	−0.20%
2015	33,944	+0.09%
2016	34,000	+0.16%

Year	Pop.	±% p.a.
2017	34,560	+1.65%
2018	35,135	+1.66%
2019	35,823	+1.96%
2020	36,085	+0.73%
2021	36,376	+0.81%
2025	39,516	+2.09%

Source: IDESCAT

== Main sights ==
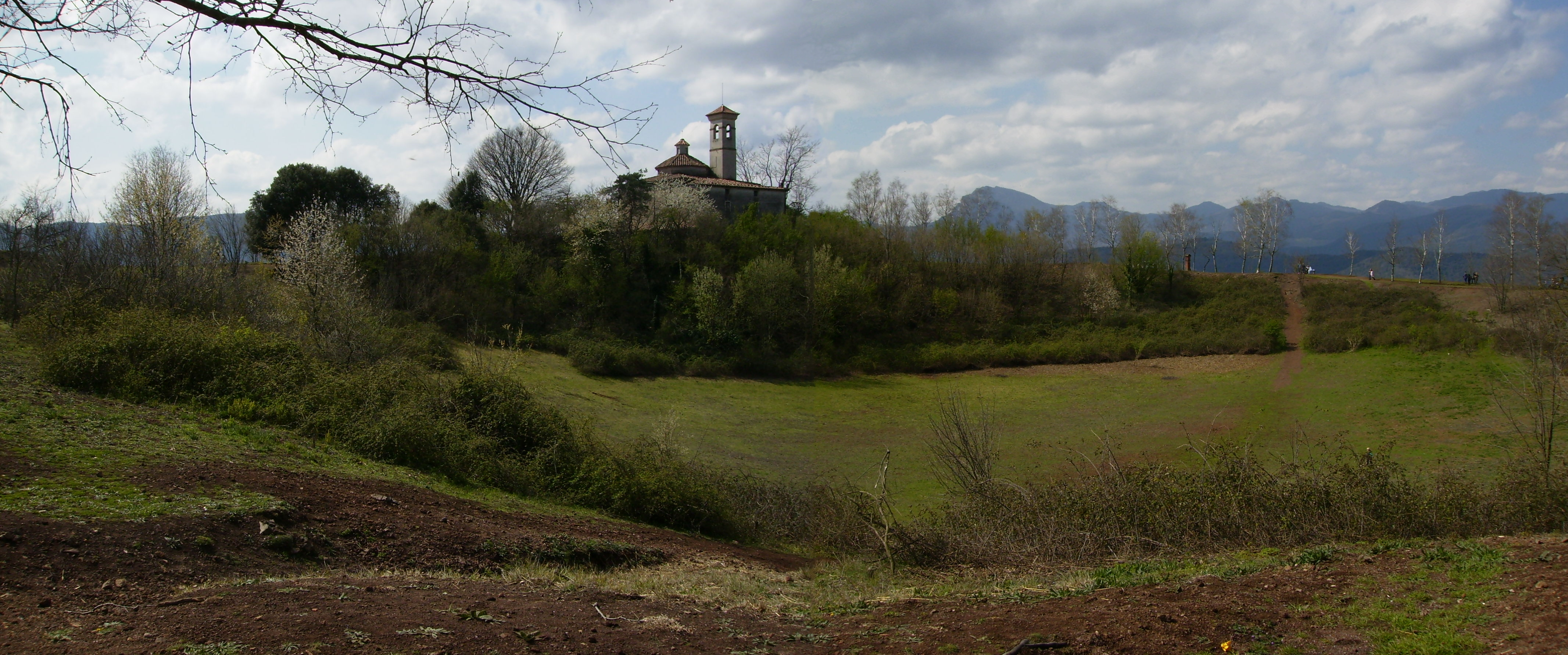
Crater of the Montsacopa

The Montsacopa volcano is one of the main symbols of Olot. It has a cone of volcanic material and a circular crater. From above, a 360° panoramic of the city can be seen. The volcano also has a chapel on its top, dedicated to Saint Francis, and two watchtowers surrounding the crater. The old town, which grew up in the 9th century, has a rich cultural heritage, including the three-storied neo-classical cloister from the Hospici (charity building), the church of la Mare de Déu del Tura (patron of Olot), the Renaissance cloister of El Carme (which is a site of National Cultural Interest), and the Sant Esteve Parish Church, which was built in 1763 and it contains several artistic treasures, including an original El Greco (Christ carrying the Cross). Also in the old town there are examples of Art Nouveau architecture, like the Solà-Morales house.

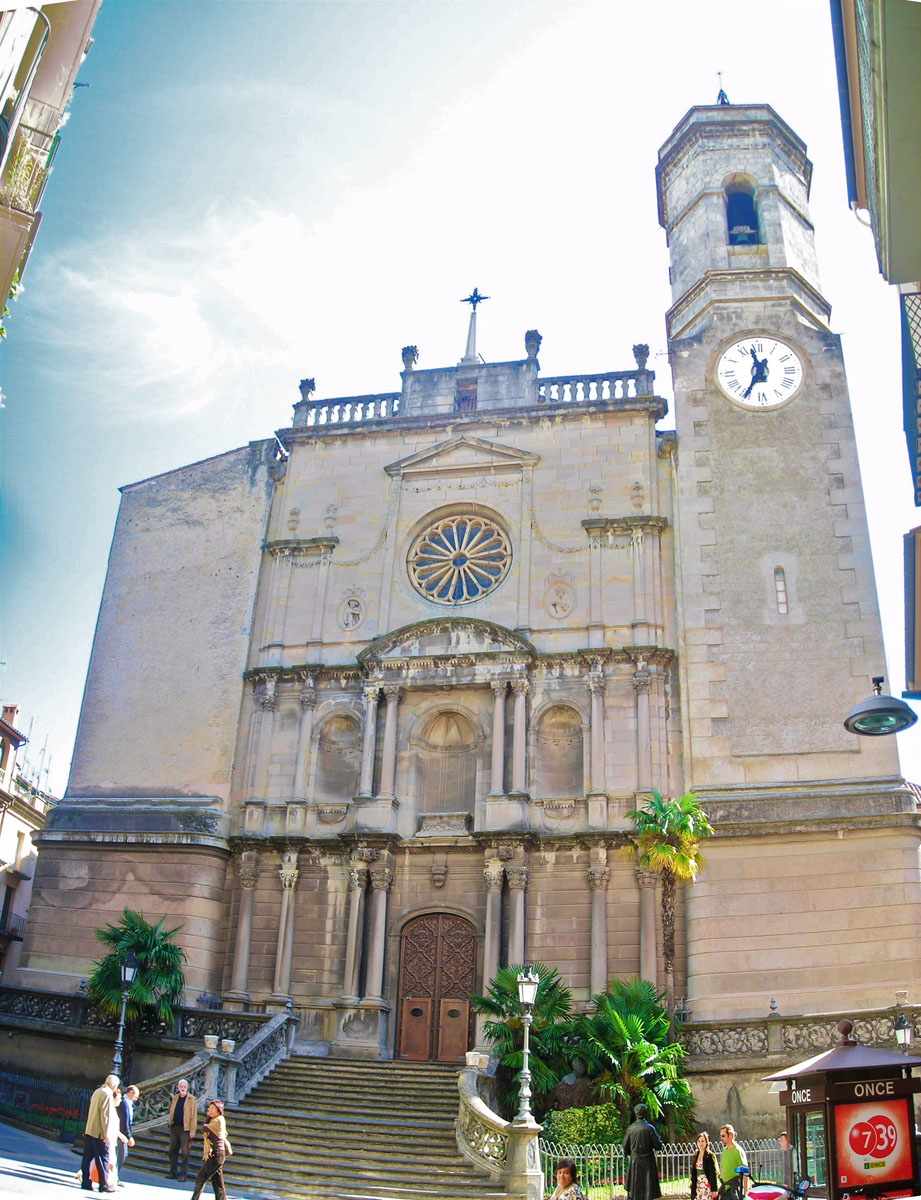
Sant Esteve Parish Church

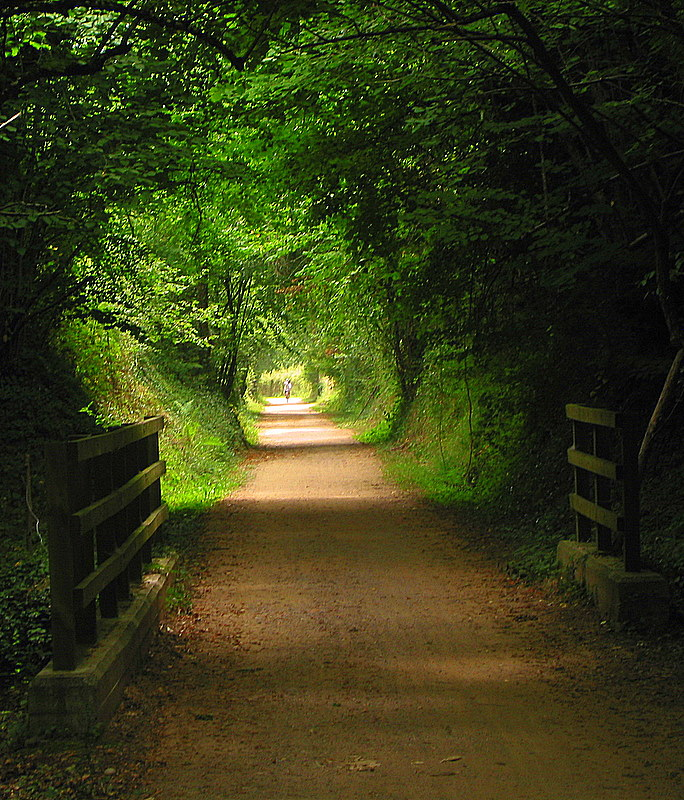
Former Olot-Girona railway, currently a bicycle path

Painting, sculpture and ceramics have been the key elements in the art of Olot, not to mention the tradition of the Nativity Scenes (pessebres), and the worldwide famous sculptures of saints. Also of importance is the School of Art, which was created in 1783 and nowadays it is the most important school of arts in the province of Girona (Escola d'Art i Superior de Disseny d'Olot). The artistic tradition of the city can be seen in several museums, being the Museu Comarcal de la Garrotxa the most relevant.

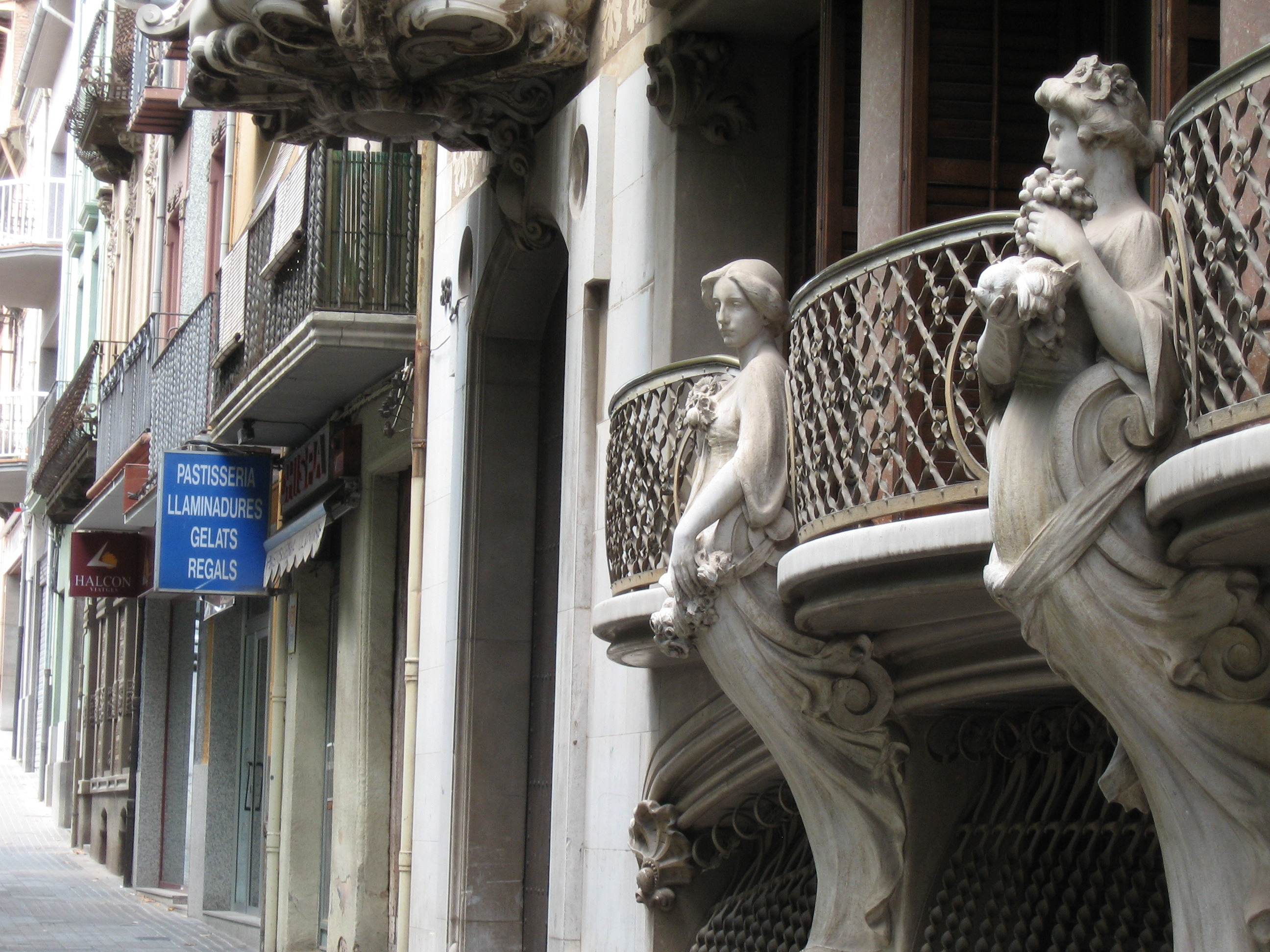
Solà-Morales house

In Olot, there are two important natural areas, the Moixina and the Parc Nou, which are characterized by their oak woods, which boast an understorey of plants that are extremely rare on the south side of the Pyrenees. These woods also inspired many of the painters from the "Olot school". With the city being situated in the Zona Volcànica de la Garrotxa Natural Park, the surrounding area also offers spectacular natural places like the Fageda d'en Jordà (a beech forest with volcanic blisters) or the natural springs of Sant Roc. The city also has a bicycle lane connecting to Girona, which was an old railway.

Main products of Olot's local gastronomy are the sweet herbal liquor ratafia, the traditional cakes coca de llardons and tortell de matafaluga, the charcuterie from Olot, the Olot potatoes (wafers of potato stuffed with meat, covered in egg and flour, and then deep-fried), and the buckwheat flour. Some of the restaurants of the city have grouped together, offering the so-called "volcanic cuisine".

== Notable people ==
Olot is the birthplace of several figures in the arts, literature, and business.

- Miquel Blay
- Antonio Soler
- Marià Vayreda
- Pedro Llosas Badía
- Maria Branyas, former world's oldest verified living person (January 2023 – August 2024) and the oldest Spanish person ever
- Josep Clarà, sculptor.
- Luis Riu Bertrán, hotel businessman.

== Twin towns ==
- Notre-Dame-de-Bondeville, France
- Thuir, France
