= Zona Volcànica de la Garrotxa Natural Park =

Natural park in Catalonia

- Parc Natural de la Zona Volcànica de la Garrotxa (in Catalan)
- IUCN category V (protected landscape/seascape)
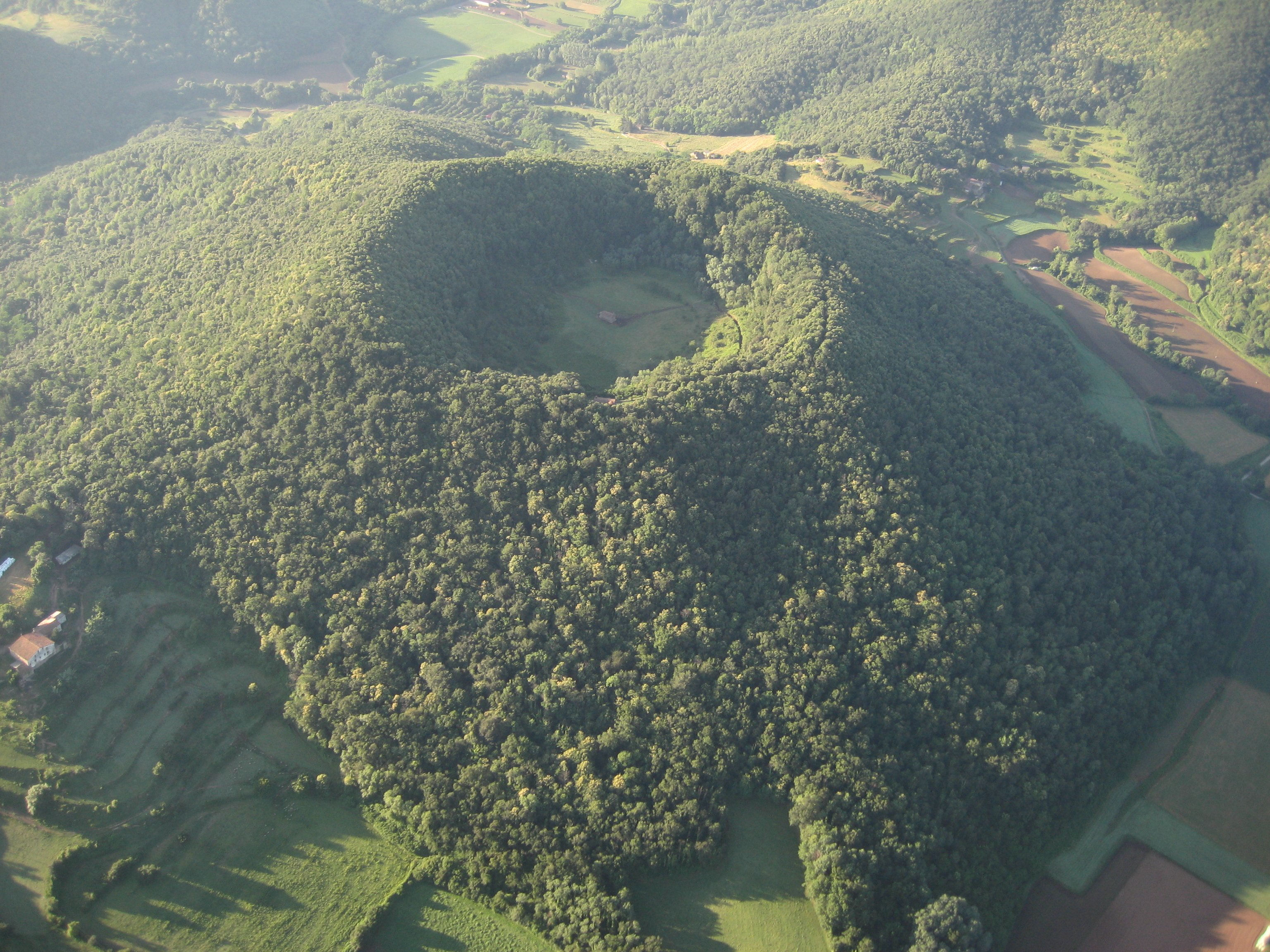
- An aerial view of Santa Margarida.
- Interactive map of Zona Volcànica de la Garrotxa Natural Park
- Location: Garrotxa, Catalonia, Spain
- Coordinates: 42°10′0″N 2°32′0″E
- Area: 15,309 hectares (153.09 km^{2})
- Established: 1982
- Governing body: Departament de Medi Ambient i Habitatge
- Website: www.gencat.cat/parcs/garrotxa/

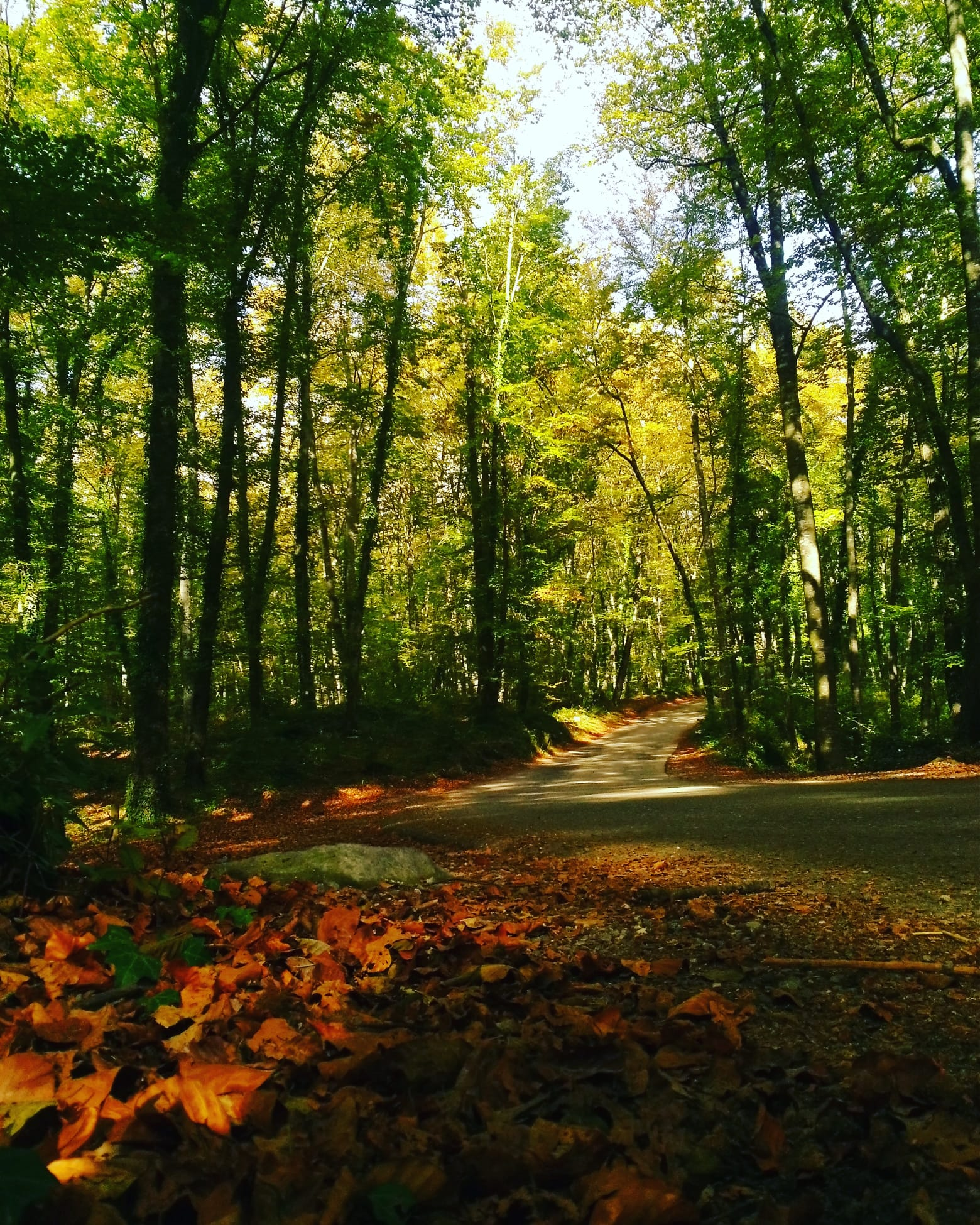
The wood of Fageda d'en Jordà.

The Zona Volcànica de la Garrotxa Natural Park (Catalan: Parc Natural de la Zona Volcànica de la Garrotxa) is a natural park area covering a Holocene volcanic field (also known as the Garrotxa volcanic field or Olot volcanic field) in Catalonia, northeastern Spain. The volcanoes, of which there are about forty within the park, are no longer active, with the last eruption (Croscat) occurring about 11,000 years ago. However, the region is still seismically active, and a large earthquake in 1428 caused damage to buildings and twenty deaths in Barcelona, 90 kilometres (56 mi) to the south. More recent earthquakes in 1901 and 1902 caused shaking but little damage.

The park covers 12,093.02 hectares, and includes territory from eleven municipalities in the comarca of Garrotxa. The built-up areas of Olot, Santa Pau, Sant Joan les Fonts and Castellfollit de la Roca are completely surrounded by the park. Including these urban areas, the population of the park is more than 40,000 people, and the economic development of the zone is one of the objectives of the park management, while trying to avoid the damage caused by quarrying, urban sprawl and illegal waste disposal. Some 980.86 ha of the park, including the best preserved volcanic cones, are fully protected as nature reserves.

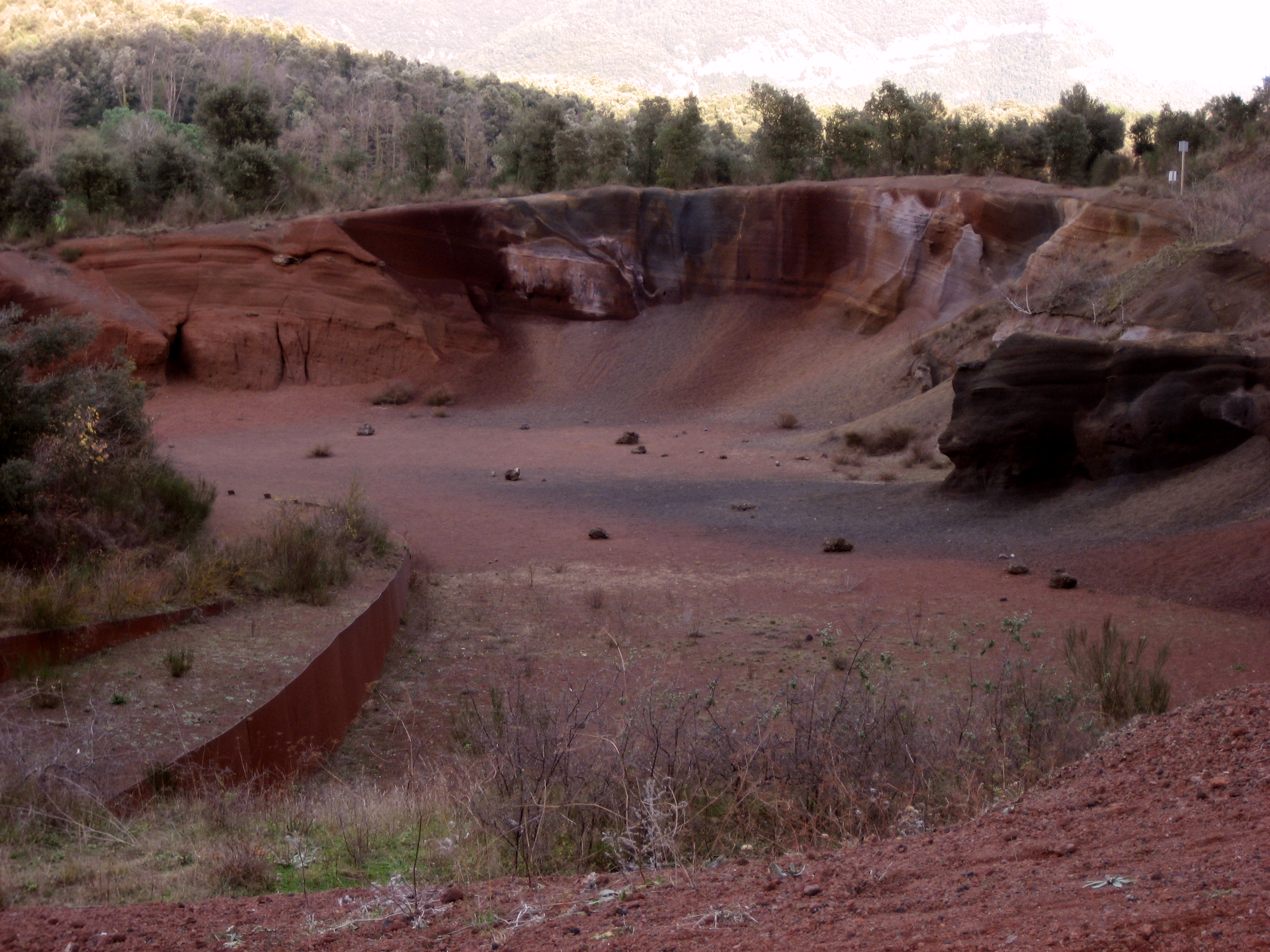
Volcano in the Garrotxa Volcanic Zone Natural Park - a protected natural area covering a Holocene volcanic field in Catalonia, northeastern Spain.

== Geology ==
The Garrotxa field is a monogenetic volcanic field, with each volcano representing a single period of eruption. The field became active about 700,000 years ago, and is the most recent example of volcanic activity in northeastern Catalonia, which dates back 10 million years. It contains numerous tossols.

== See also ==
- List of volcanoes in Spain

== Bibliography ==
- Losantos, M.; Planagumà, L.; Pijuan, J.; de Paz, A.; Puig, C.; Bassols, E. (2006), The Geological Chart of the Volcanic Zone of la Garrotxa Natural Park (PDF), Institut Cartogràfic de Catalunya.
- Martí Molist, Joan; Pujadas, Albert; Ferrés Lopez, Dolors; Planagumà Guàrdia, Llorenç; Mallarach Carrera, Josep Maria (2001), El vulcanisme: Guia de camp de la Zona Volcànica de la Garrotxa (2ª ed.), Olot: Parc Natural de la Zona Volcànica de la Garrotxa, ISBN 84-393-5142-9. pp. 1–59; pp. 60–106.
- Martí, Joan; Planagumà, Llorenç (2016), La Garrotxa Volcanic Field of Northeast Spain, Springer, doi:10.1007/978-3-319-42080-6, ISBN 978-3-319-42080-6.
- Vilaplana, Joan Manuel; Payàs, Blanca (2008), RISKCAT: Natural Risks in Catalonia (PDF), Barcelona: Consell Assessor per al Desenvolupament Sostenible, Departament de la Vicepresidència, Generalitat de Catalunya, ISBN 978-84-393-7836-5, archived from the original (PDF) on 2011-07-23.
