= Santa Margarida Volcano =

Extinct volcano in Spain

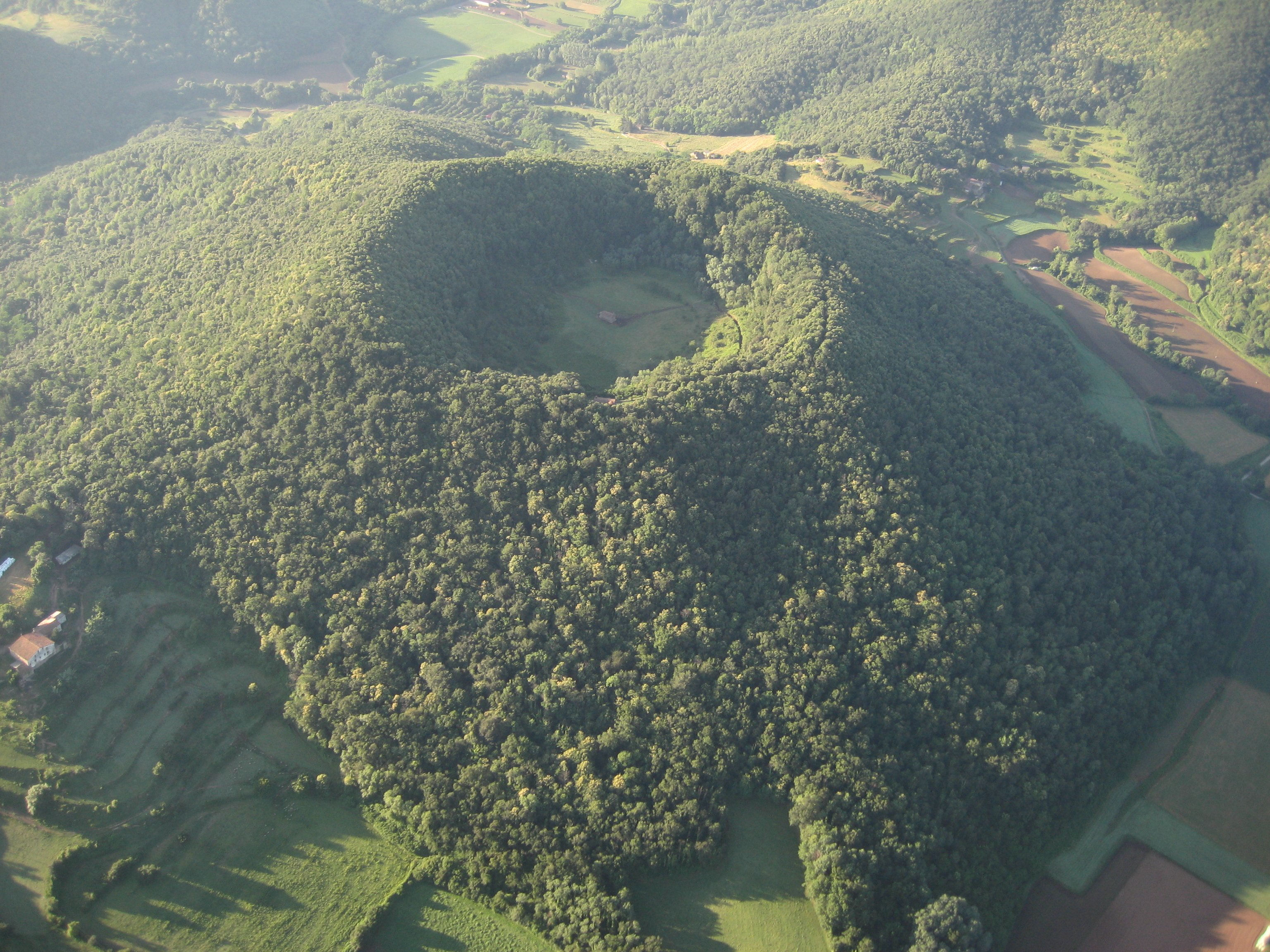
- Aerial view of the Santa Margarida Volcano

Highest point
- Elevation: 682 m (2,238 ft)
- Coordinates: 42°8′29″N 2°32′30″E

Geography
- Location within Catalonia
- Location: Santa Pau, Garrotxa, Catalonia, Spain

Geology
- Volcanic zone: Garrotxa Volcanic Zone

The Santa Margarida Volcano (Catalan: Volcà de Santa Margarida) is an extinct volcano in the comarca of Garrotxa, Catalonia, Spain. The volcano has a perimeter of 2 kilometers and a height of 682 meters and is part of the Zona Volcànica de la Garrotxa Natural Park. The hermitage of Santa Margarida, after which the volcano was named, is inside the crater of the volcano. The building was destroyed in 1428 during the 1428 Catalonia earthquake and rebuilt in 1865.

== Geology ==
A study published in 2011 at the Journal of Volcanology and Geothermal Research indicated that the Santa Margarida and Croscat volcanoes were the product of the same eruption event 11,500 years ago, alternating freatomagmatic activity, between water and magma, and magmatic activity.

== Gallery ==
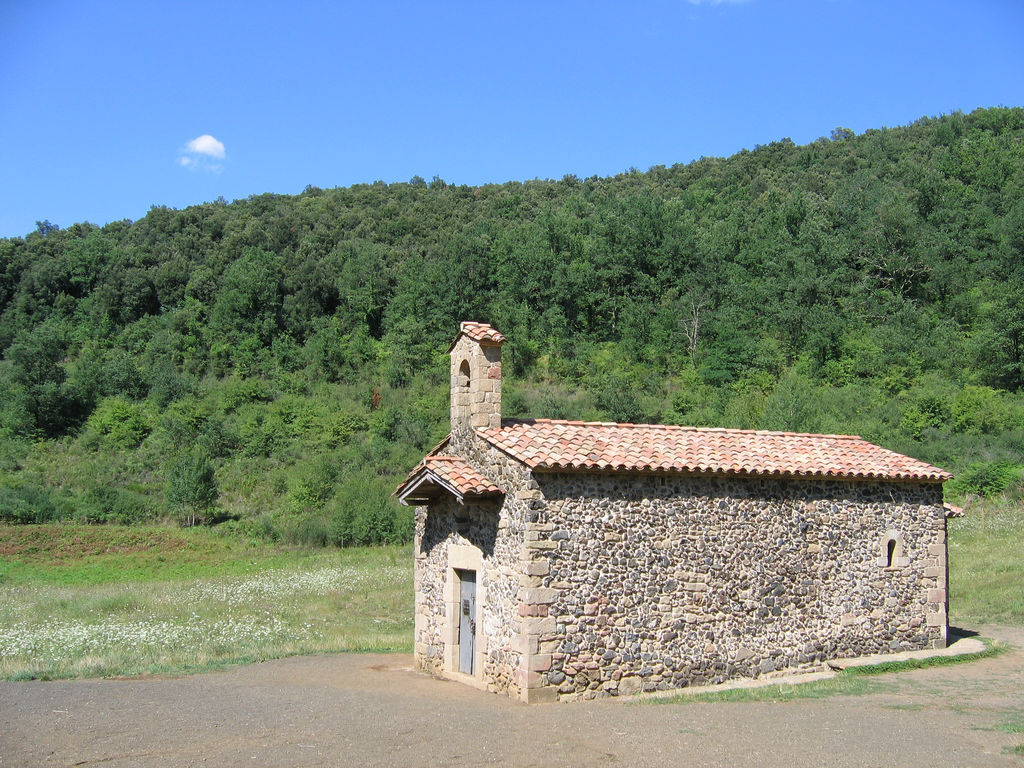
The hermitage of Santa Margarida in the crater of the volcano.

== See also ==
- List of volcanoes in Spain
