= Héctor Figueroa =

Spanish footballer

Personal information
- Full name: Héctor Figueroa Cabrera
- Date of birth: 30 October 1988 (age 38)
- Place of birth: Las Palmas, Spain
- Height: 1.83 m (6 ft 0 in)
- Position: Forward

Team information
- Current team: Villa Santa Brígida

Youth career
- Villa Santa Brígida

Senior career*
Years	Team	Apps	(Gls)
2008–2009	Villa Santa Brígida B	13	(3)
2009–2012	Villa Santa Brígida	101	(28)
2012–2013	Estrella	19	(8)
2013–2014	Las Palmas B	39	(23)
2014–2017	Las Palmas	18	(3)
2015–2016	→ Huesca (loan)	16	(2)
2016–2017	→ Ponferradina (loan)	34	(5)
2017–2018	Toledo	32	(9)
2018–2019	Burgos	7	(1)
2019	Lincoln Red Imps	10	(10)
2019–2021	Gran Tarajal	47	(28)
2021–2023	Arucas	55	(18)
2023–	Villa Santa Brígida	25	(3)
- * Club domestic league appearances and goals as of 12 October 2024

Héctor Figueroa Cabrera (born 30 October 1988) is a Spanish professional footballer who plays for Villa Santa Brígida as a forward.

== Football career ==
Born in Las Palmas, Canary Islands, Figueroa finished his graduation with local UD Villa de Santa Brígida's youth setup, and made his senior debuts with the reserves in the 2008–09 season, in Tercera División. In the same campaign he also began appearing with the main squad, in Segunda División B.

In the 2012 summer Figueroa joined Estrella CF, also in the fourth level. In January of the following year he signed with UD Las Palmas, being initially assigned to the reserves, being promoted to the third level at the end of 2012–13 season and also being the club second topscorer (only two goals behind Cristian Herrera).

On 29 January 2014, after being the B-team's topscorer in Segunda División B, Figueroa was promoted to the main squad in Segunda División, signing a 2 1/2-year deal. He made his debut as a professional three days later, starting in a 0–1 away loss against SD Eibar.

Figueroa scored his first professional goal on 15 March, netting the last in a 5–0 home routing over CE Sabadell FC. On 4 August 2015 he signed a new contract until 2018, being immediately loaned to SD Huesca also in the second tier.

On 19 July 2016, Figueroa moved to SD Ponferradina again in a temporary deal. The following 7 July, after returning from loan, he cut ties with Las Palmas and went on to resume his career in the third division, representing CD Toledo and Burgos CF.

== Personal life ==
Figueroa's older brothers, Momo and David, also played for Las Palmas.
