= UD Villa de Santa Brígida =

Spanish football club

Villa Santa Brígida
- Full name: Unión Deportiva Villa de Santa Brígida
- Founded: 2004
- Ground: Estadio de los Olivos, Santa Brígida, Canary Islands, Spain
- Capacity: 600
- Chairman: (Spain) Hilarión Rodríguez García
- Manager: (Spain) Israel Quintana
- League: Tercera Federación – Group 12
- 2025–26: Tercera Federación – Group 12, 8th of 18
Home colours	Away colours

Unión Deportiva Villa de Santa Brígida is a Spanish football team based in Santa Brígida, Las Palmas, in the autonomous community of Canary Islands. Founded in 2004, it plays in Tercera Federación – Group 12, holding home matches at Estadio de los Olivos, with a capacity of 600 seats.

== History ==
Unión Deportiva Villa Santa Brígida was founded in 2004, after the merger between Club Deportivo Santa Brígida and Sociedad Deportiva Santa Brígida. It first reached the third division three years later, lasting two seasons in the category. In June 2019 Israel Quintana became the new head coach of the club.

=== Club background ===
Club Deportivo Santa Brígida - (1984–2004) → ↓

Unión Deportiva Villa Santa Brígida - (2004–)

Sociedad Deportiva Santa Brígida - (1965–2004) → ↑

== Season to season ==
Season	Tier	Division	Place	Copa del Rey
2004–05	4	3ª	5th	
2005–06	4	3ª	5th	
2006–07	4	3ª	3rd	
2007–08	3	2ª B	16th	
2008–09	3	2ª B	20th	
2009–10	4	3ª	7th	
2010–11	4	3ª	5th	
2011–12	4	3ª	8th	
2012–13	4	3ª	10th	
2013–14	4	3ª	6th	
2014–15	4	3ª	6th	
2015–16	4	3ª	1st	
2016–17	4	3ª	3rd	First round
2017–18	4	3ª	8th	
2018–19	4	3ª	7th	
2019–20	4	3ª	20th	
2020–21	4	3ª	9th / 4th	
2021–22	5	3ª RFEF	5th	
2022–23	5	3ª Fed.	5th	
2023–24	5	3ª Fed.	9th	

Season	Tier	Division	Place	Copa del Rey
2024–25	5	3ª Fed.	11th	
2025–26	5	3ª Fed.	8th	
2026–27	5	3ª Fed.		

- 2 seasons in Segunda División B
- 15 seasons in Tercera División
- 6 seasons in Tercera Federación/Tercera División RFEF

== Honours ==
- Tercera División: 2015–16

== Famous players ==
- (Spain) Héctor Figueroa
- (Spain) José María Ojeda
- (Spain) Antonio Robaina
- (Spain) Jerónimo Santana

== See also ==
- UD Villa de Santa Brígida B, reserve team
