= List of volcanoes in Spain =

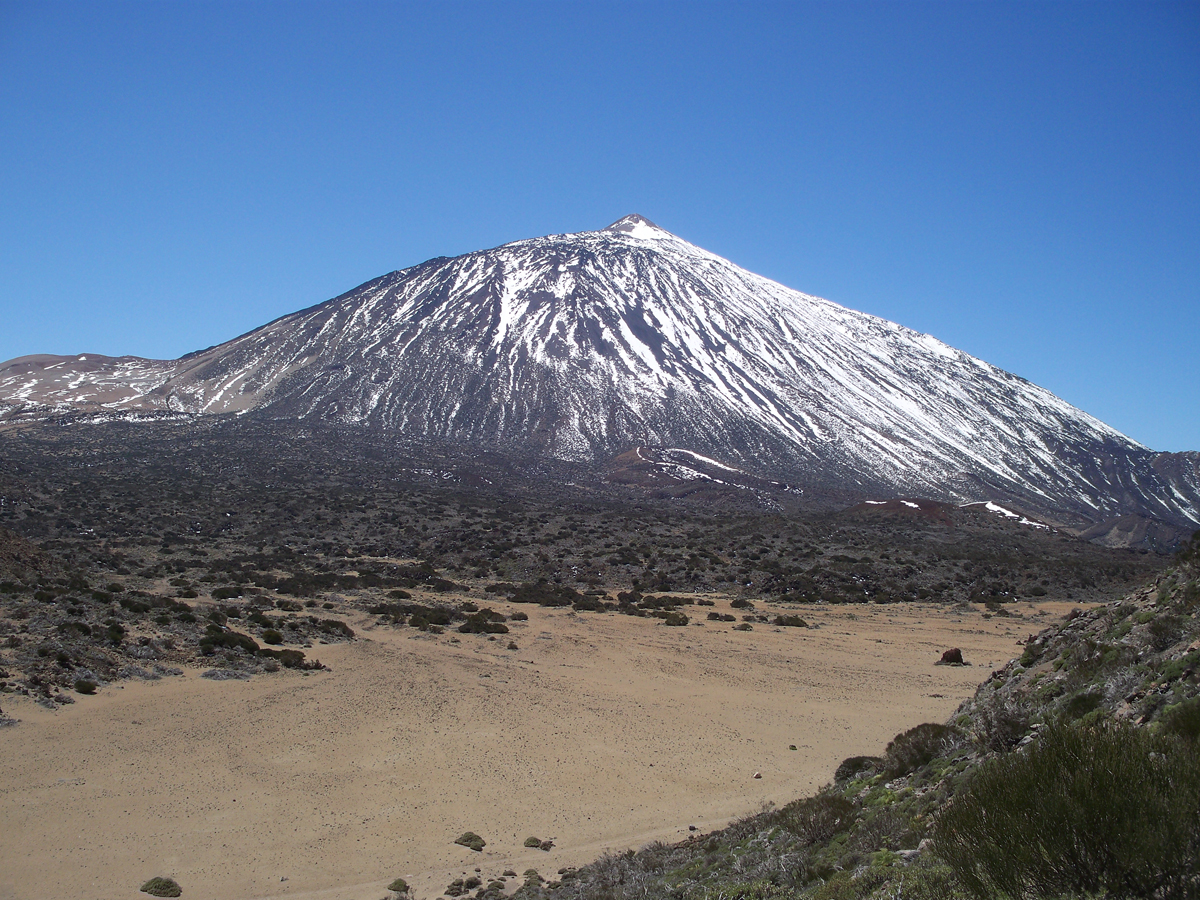
Teide, the highest point in Spain

This is a list of active and extinct volcanoes in Spain.

== Canary Islands ==
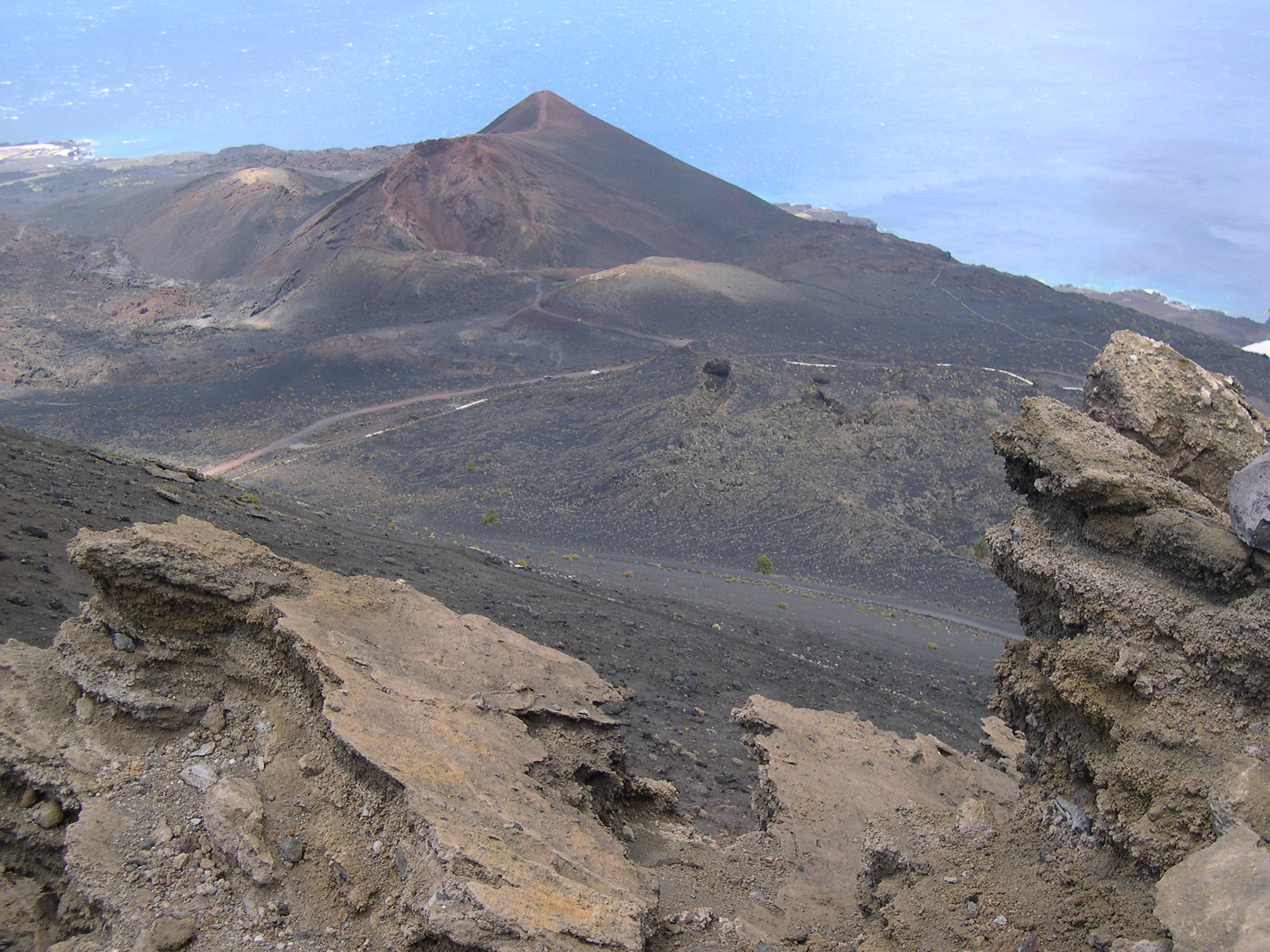
Teneguía was the source of the last volcanic eruption in 1971 on Spanish soil until 2021.

Name	Elevation		Location	Last eruption
Name	meters	feet	Coordinates	Last eruption
Fuerteventura	812	2664	28.358°N 14.02°W	4000-5000 BC
Gran Canaria	1949	6398	28.00°N 15.58°W	20 BC
El Hierro	1501	4920	27.73°N 18.03°W	2011
La Palma	2426	6394	28.58°N 17.83°W	2021
Lanzarote	670	2198	29.03°N 13.63°W	1824
Tenerife	3718	12,188	28.27°N 16.64°W	1909

=== Lanzarote ===
- Caldera Blanca
- Cerro Tegoyo
- Guanapay
- Massif of Marissa
- Massif of Los Ajaches
- Montaña de El Golfo
- Montaña Negra
- Pico Colorado
- Timanfaya Volcanic Field
- Volcan of La Corona

=== Fuerteventura ===
- Caldera Los Arrabales
- Calderón Hondo
- Lobos Island Volcanic Field
- Massif of Betancuria
- Massif of Haler
- Montaña Blanca
- Montaña de La Arena
- Montaña de la Raya
- Montaña de Tindaya
- Volcanes de Babuyo
- Vulcan de Jacomar

=== Gran Canaria ===
- Bandama Caldera
- Caldera de los Marteles
- Caldera de Tejeda
- Caldera de Tirajana
- Haler de Arinaga
- La Isleta volcanic field
- Massif of Güigüi
- Massif of Tamadaba
- Montaña de Arucas
- Montaña de Gáldar
- Montañón Negro
- Pico de las Nieves
- Stratovolcano of Roque Nublo

=== Tenerife ===
- Alto de Guajara
- Caldera of Las Canadas
- Massif of Anaga
- Malpaís de Güímar
- Massif of Teno
- Montana de Las Arenas
- Pedro Gil ridge
- Teide
- Teno ridge
- Travejo Volcano
- Vulcan of Arafo
- Vulcan of Chahorra
- Vulcan Chinyero
- Vulcan of Fasnia

=== La Gomera ===
- Roque de Agando

=== La Palma ===
- Caldera de Taburiente
- Cumbre Nueva
- Cumbre Vieja
- Duraznero Volcano
- Hoyo Negro
- Pico Birigoyo
- Volcan de Fuencaliente
- Volcán San Juan
- Vulcan of San Antonio
- Vulcan of Martín
- Vulcan of El Charco
- Tajogaite
- Teneguía

=== El Hierro ===
- Pico de Malpaso
- Tagoro
- Tanganosoga
- Vulcan of Lomo Negro

== Mainland Spain ==
There are several volcanic areas in mainland Spain, such as:

- Cabo de Gata, Almería
- Campo de Calatrava, Ciudad Real
- Cofrentes, Valencia
- Columbretes Islands, Castellón
- Zona Volcànica de la Garrotxa Natural Park, Girona
- Campo de Cartagena, Cartagena (Upper Miocene)
  - Isla Grosa, in the Mediterranean east of La Manga del Mar Menor
  - Cerro del Calnegre and Monteblanco, on La Manga del Mar Menor
  - Isla Mayor o del Barón, Isla Perdiguera, Isla del Ciervo, Isla Rondella o Redonda and Isla del Sujeto in the Mar Menor
  - El Carmolí, on the landward coast of the Mar Menor.
  - Cabezo Beaza, Cabezo de la Fraila and Cabezo Ventura, on the eastern edge of Cartagena
  - Volcán Aljorra, northwest of Cartagena
  - Cabezo Negro de Tallante, Pico Cebolla and Los Pérez, west-northwest of Cartagena

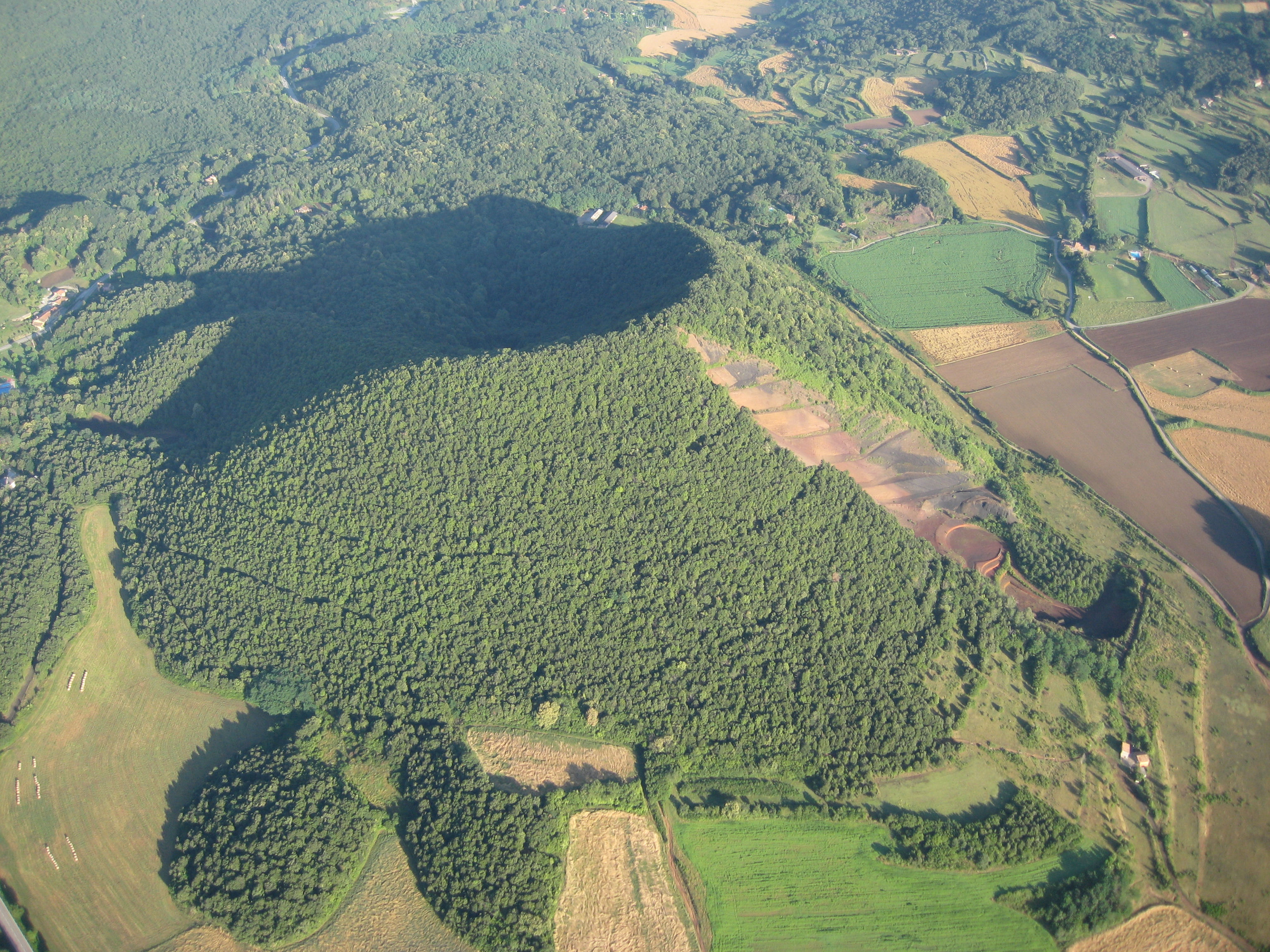
Aerial view of the Croscat volcano.

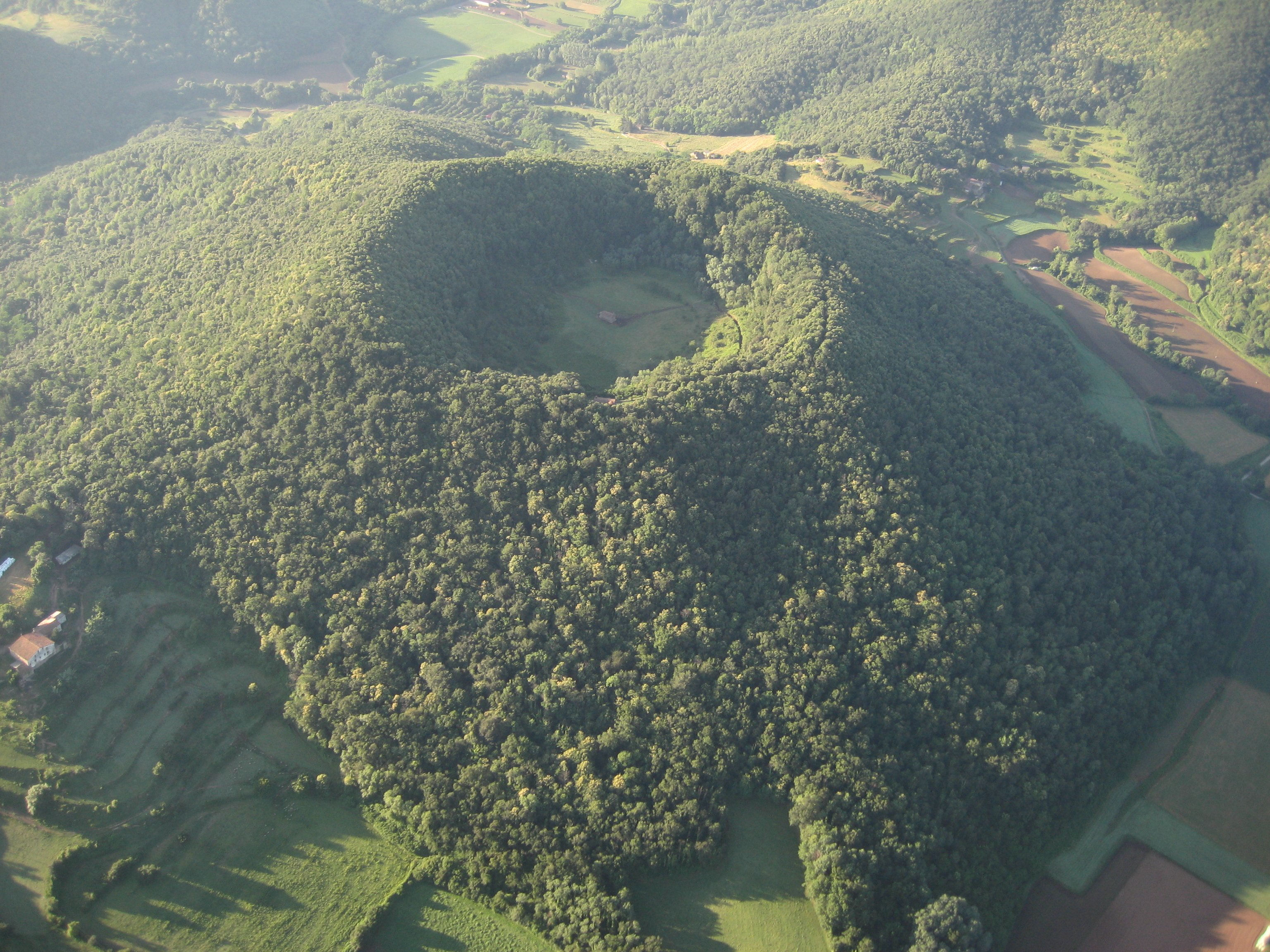
Aerial view of the Santa Margarida Volcano.

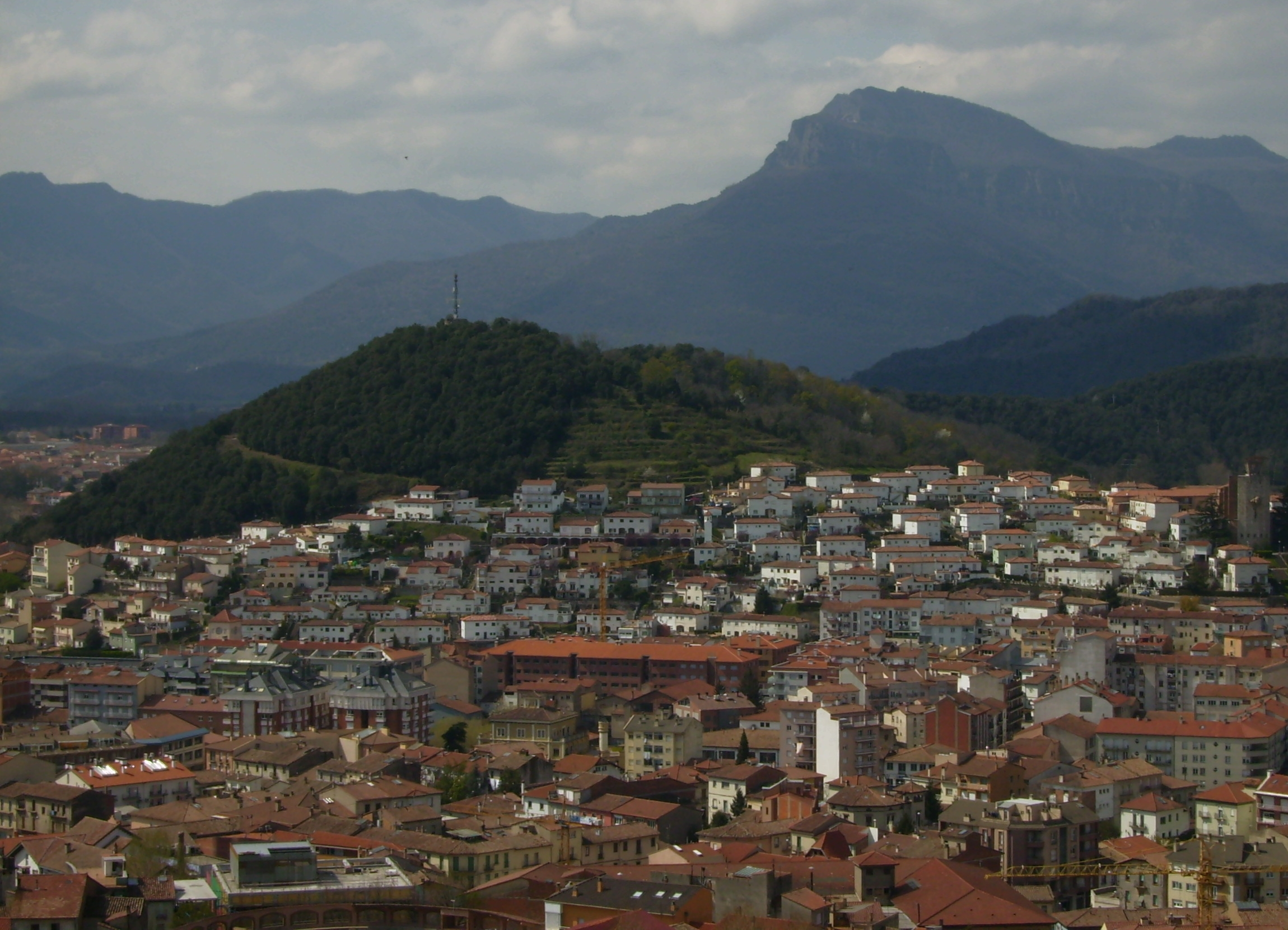
Montolivet Volcano in Olot.

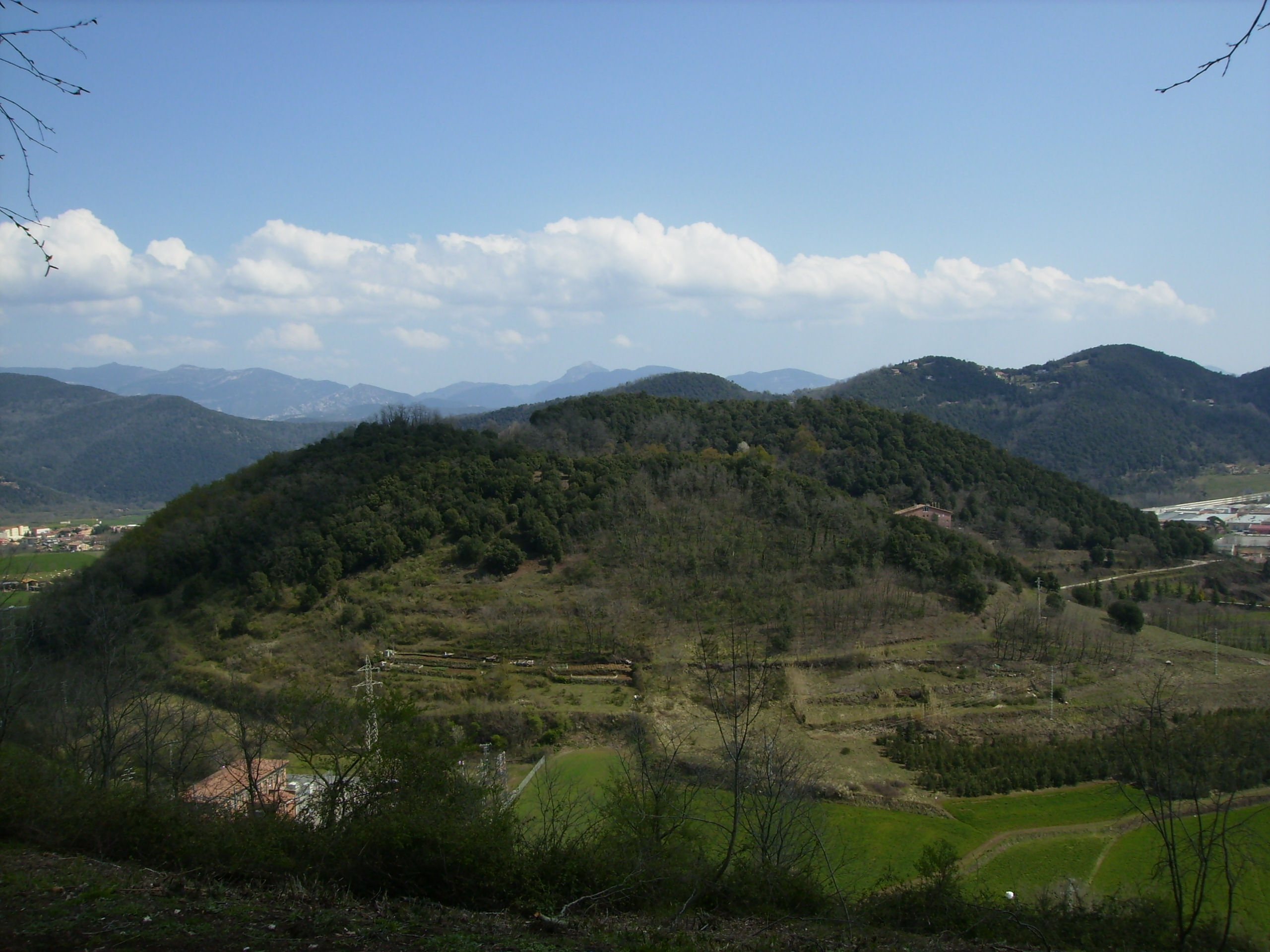
Garrinada Volcano in Olot.

=== Garrotxa Volcanic Zone ===
There are 40 volcanoes at the comarca of the Garrotxa, 38 of which are part of the Zona Volcànica de la Garrotxa Natural Park.

- Volcà de la Canya
- Volcà d’Aiguanegra
- Volcà de Repàs
- Volcà de Repassot
- Volcà del Cairat
- Volcà de Claperols
- Volcà del Puig de l’Ós
- Volcà del Puig de l’Estany
- Volcà del Puig de Bellaire
- Volcà de Gengí
- Volcà del Bac de les Tries
- Volcà de les Bisaroques
- Volcà de la Garrinada
- Volcà del Montsacopa
- Volcà de Montolivet
- Volcà de Can Barraca
- Volcà del Puig Astrol
- Volcà de Pujalós
- Volcà del Puig de la Garsa
- Volcà del Croscat
- Volcà de Cabrioler
- Volcà del Puig Jordà
- Volcà del Puig de la Costa
- Volcà del Puig de Martinyà
- Volcà del Puig de Mar
- Volcà de Santa Margarida
- Volcà de Comadega
- Volcà del Puig Subià
- Volcà de Rocanegra
- Volcà de Simon
- Volcà del Pla sa Ribera
- Volcà de Sant Jordi
- Volcà del Racó
- Volcà de Fontpobra
- Volcà de la Tuta de Colltort
- Volcà de Can Tià
- Volcà de Sant Marc (Note: Located outside the Zona Volcànica de la Garrotxa Natural Park.)
- Volcà del Puig Roig
- Volcà del Traiter
- Volcà de les Medes

Additionally, there are at least seven other volcanoes located in the Province of Girona:

- Volcà de la Crosa de Sant Dalmai
- Volcà del Puig d’Adri
- El Rocàs
- Volcà del Clot de l’Omera
- Volcà del Puig de la Banya del Boc
- Volcà de Granollers de Rocacorba
- Puig Montner

== Major eruptions ==
Historical eruptions in the Canary Islands
Year^{1}	Name/Volcano	Island	Eruption/Cessation date	Duration (days)
1430/1440	Tacande o Montaña Quemada	La Palma	?	?
1492	Eruption of Colón	Tenerife	?	?
1585	Tehuya	La Palma	19 May/10 Aug	84
1646	V. Martín o de Tigalate	La Palma	2 Oct/ 21 Dec	82
1667/1678	V. de San Antonio	La Palma	17 Nov/21 Jan	66
1704/1705	V. de Sietefuentes	Tenerife	31 Dec/4 or 5 Jan	5
1704/1705	V. de Fasnia	Tenerife	5 Jan/ 16 Jan	12
1704/1705	V. de Arafo	Tenerife	2 Feb/27 Mar	54
1706	E. de Garachico / V. de Arenas Negras	Tenerife	5 May/13 Jun	40
1712	E. del Charco	La Palma	9 Oct/ 3 Dec	56
1730/1736	E. de Timanfaya	Lanzarote	1 Sep 1730/ 16 Apr 1736	2055
1798	E. Narices del Teide / V. de Chahorra	Tenerife	9 Jun/14-15 Sep	99
1824	V. de Tao or del Clérigo / Duarte	Lanzarote	31 Jul/ 31 Jul	86
1824	V. Nuevo del Fuego ó del Chinero	Lanzarote	29 Sep/5 Oct	
1824	V. Nuevo or de Tinguatón	Lanzarote	10 Oct/24 Oct	
1909	V. del Chinyero	Tenerife	18 Nov/27 Nov	10
1949	E. de San Juan V. de Nambroque / Duraznero / Hoyo Negro/ Llano del Banco	La Palma	24 Jun/30 Jul	47
1971	V. del Teneguía	La Palma	26 Oct/18 Nov	24
2011/2012	Tagoro	El Hierro	11 Oct/5 Mar	
2021	V. Tajogaite	La Palma	19 Sep/13 Dec	85

Notes

^{1} Only eruptions with established and documented references that describe eruptive processes.

== See also ==
- Geology of the Canary Islands
- Lists of volcanoes
