= Croscat =

Volcano in Catalonia, Spain

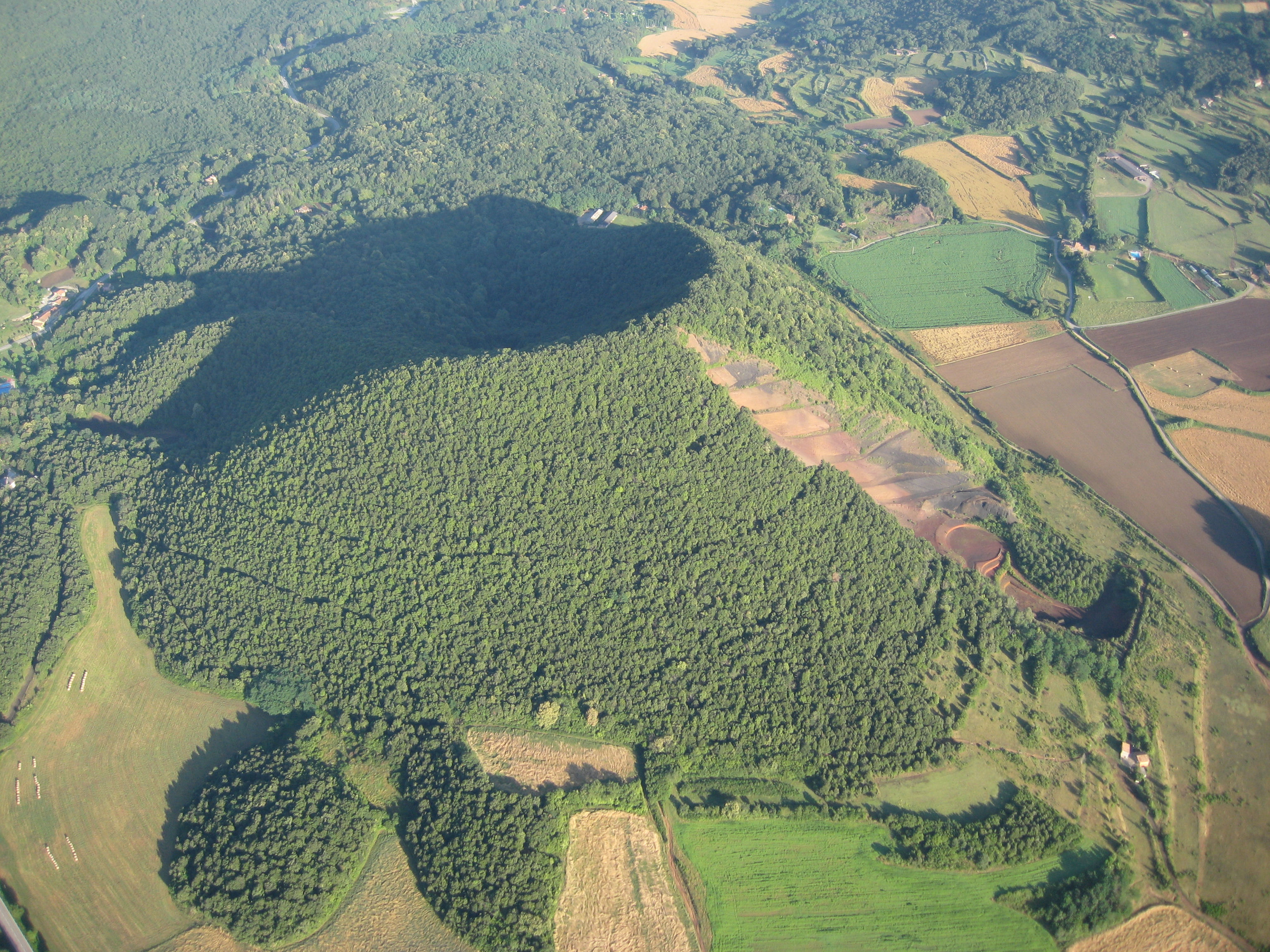
- Aerial view of the Croscat volcano

Highest point
- Elevation: 786 m (2,579 ft)
- Coordinates: 42°9′15″N 2°32′9″E

Geography
- Location within Catalonia
- Location: Garrotxa, Catalonia, Spain
- Parent range: Catalan Transversal Range

Geology
- Volcanic field: Garrotxa Volcanic Field
- Last eruption: 11,500 years ago (Note: Its last eruption is estimated to have occurred around 11,500 or 11,000 years ago depending on the source.)

The Croscat (Catalan pronunciation: [kɾusˈkat]) is a volcano in the comarca of Garrotxa, Catalonia, Spain. It is both the youngest and highest volcano in the Iberian Peninsula, with the last eruption dated back to about 14,000 years Before Present. The volcanic cone has a horseshoe shape, and its northeastern flank was quarried for volcanic gravel until the early 1990s, exposing the internal structure of the cone from top to bottom. The volcano is located in the Garrotxa volcanic field, a Quaternary volcanic field also known as Olot volcanic field, as part of the protected area of the Zona Volcànica de la Garrotxa Natural Park.

== Geology ==
The cone has a height of 189.04 metres (620.2 ft) (Note: The height of the cone is given as 156 metres (512 ft), 160 metres (520 ft) or 189.04 metres (620.2 ft) depending on the source.) and an elliptical base with a horseshoe shape, probably caused by the breaching of the western-side of the volcano as a result of the effusion of lava flows during the last eruptive phase of Croscat. Tis lava creates lots of tossols in this Área.

A study published in 2011 at the Journal of Volcanology and Geothermal Research revealed that the Santa Margarida Volcano and the Croscat were the product of the same eruption event 11,500 years ago, alternating phreatomagmatic activity, between water and magma, and magmatic activity.

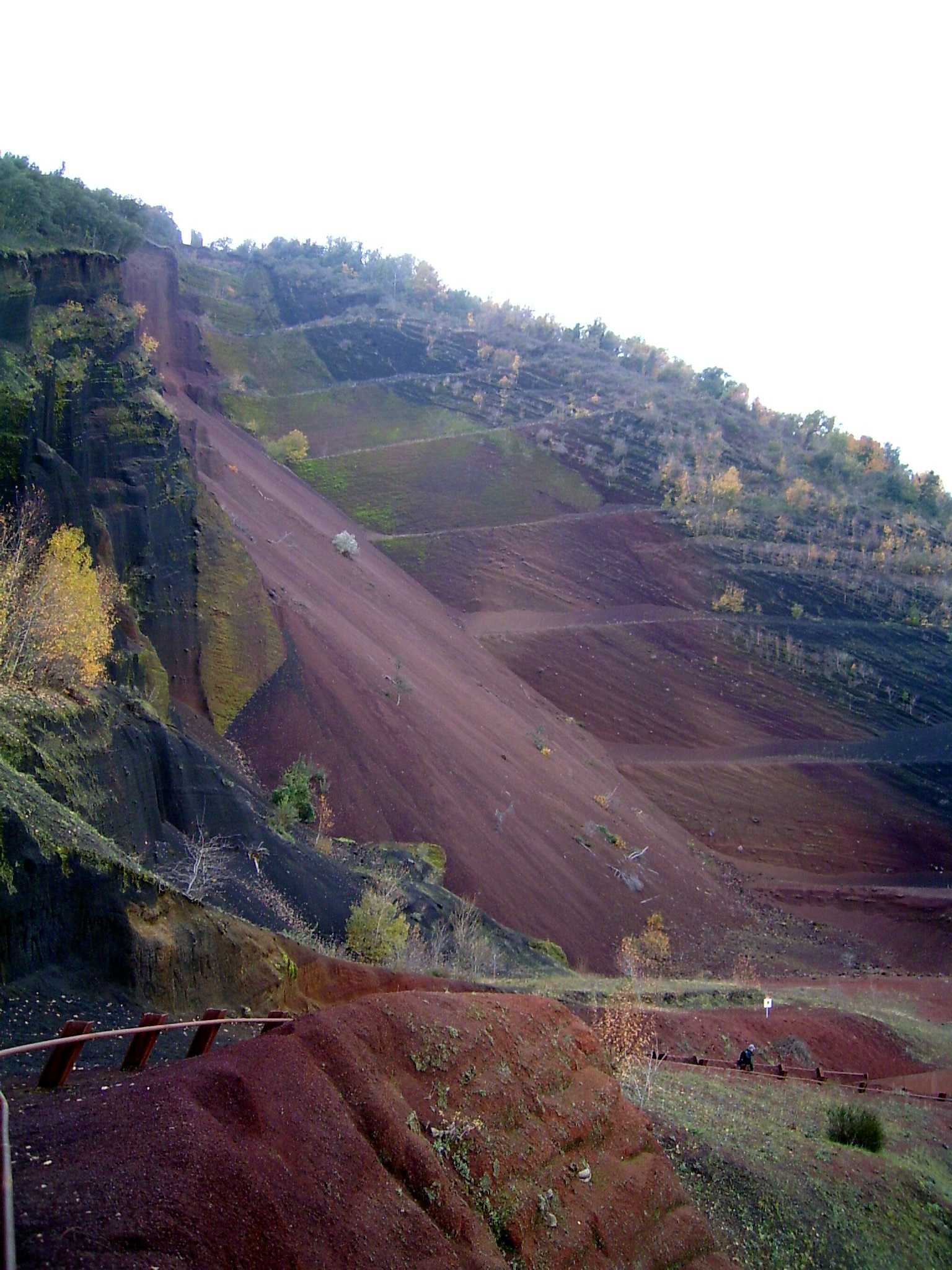
The internal structure of the cone has been exposed by mining operations.

== Human history ==
Starting from the 1960s, the northeastern flank of the volcano was quarried for lapilli gravel. The extraction of material from the volcano cone and the degradation of the volcanoes of the Garrotxa Volcanic Field sparked a series of protests in the 1970s to protect the volcanic field, a campaign that came to be known as Save the Volcanoes (Catalan: Salvem els Volcans). The extraction area was also used as an uncontrolled municipal landfill for the city of Olot. In 1982 the Zona Volcànica de la Garrotxa Natural Park was created to protect the area but the extraction lasted for another nine years. Further protests were sparked after an agreement was reached between the concessionaire of the quarry, Minas de Olot, SA, and the Generalitat of Catalonia for the further extraction of 2.7 million tons with educational and scientific purposes, with the commitment of restoration of all excavated areas. The successive non-fulfillment of the restoration program resulted in the issue of at least ten disciplinary proceedings in the subsequent years. The mining operations were stopped in 1991, when the Generalitat of Catalonia acquired the majority of shares of the mining company.

The extraction left a vent 100 metres (330 ft) high and 400 metres (1,300 ft) long covering around 40 degrees. In the 1990s a territorial landscaping project was undertaken to restore the extraction site and the landfill to recover the morphology of the base of the volcano and the pastures surrounding the area. The project, which won an award for landscape design, minimized the landscape impact, prevented erosion and planned public access for educational purposes. When visiting this Área its mandatory for everybody to pay for parquing the car in the Can Serra área and also in other parkings. Also for guided groups they need to do a reservation for visiting croscat volcano, and When entering to the volcano they have to do a check in to the Can Passavent House.

== Gallery ==
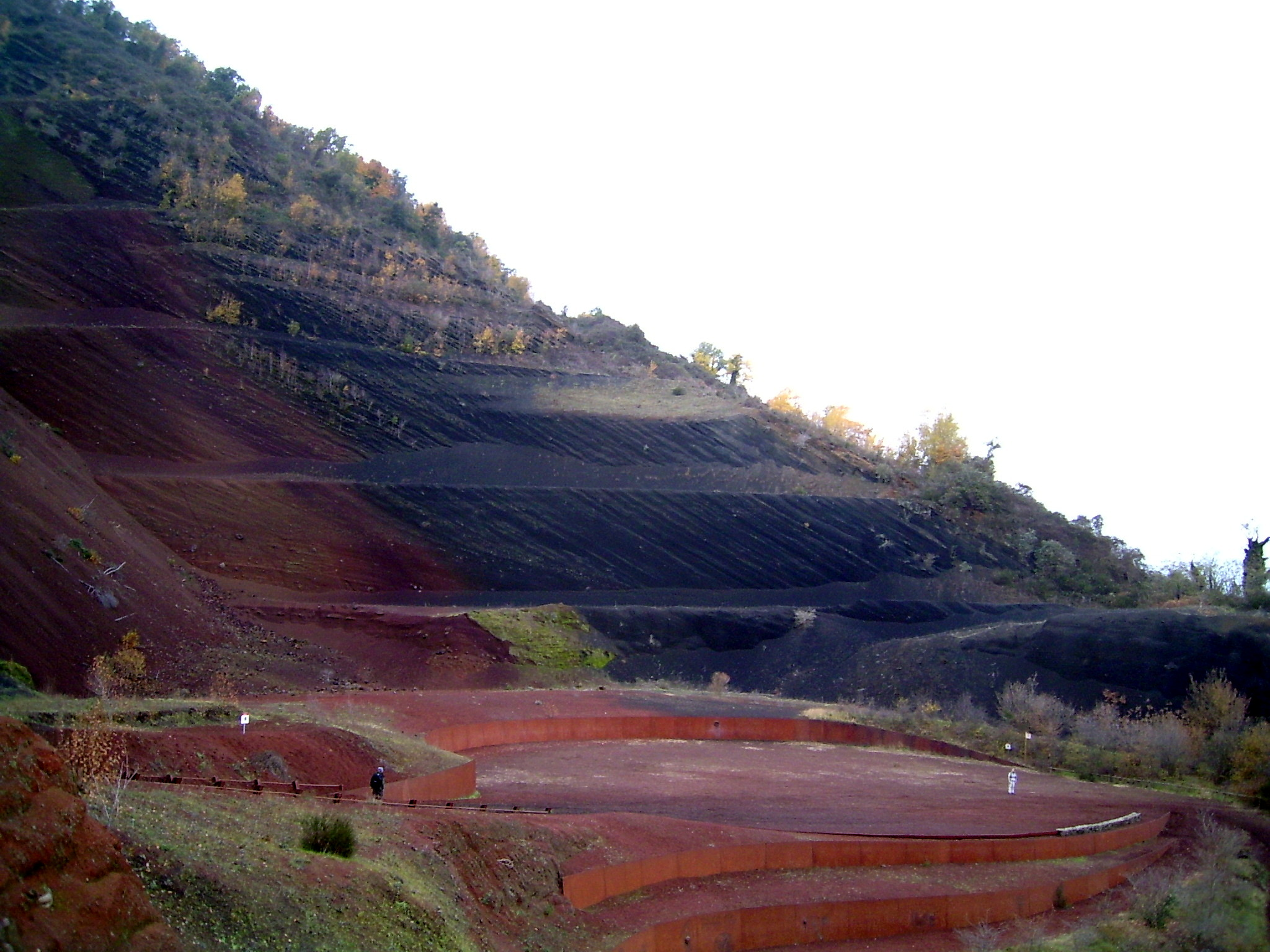

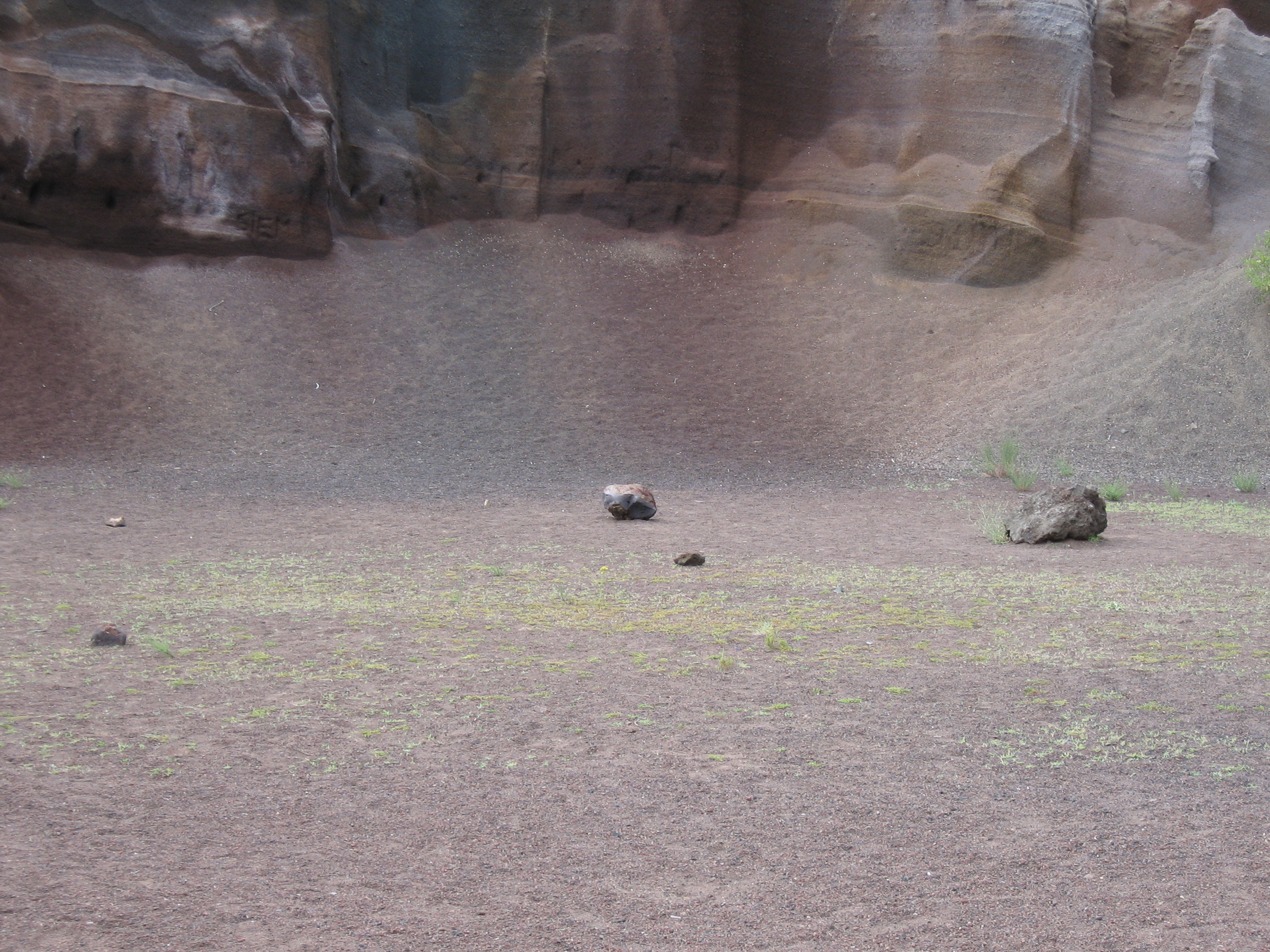

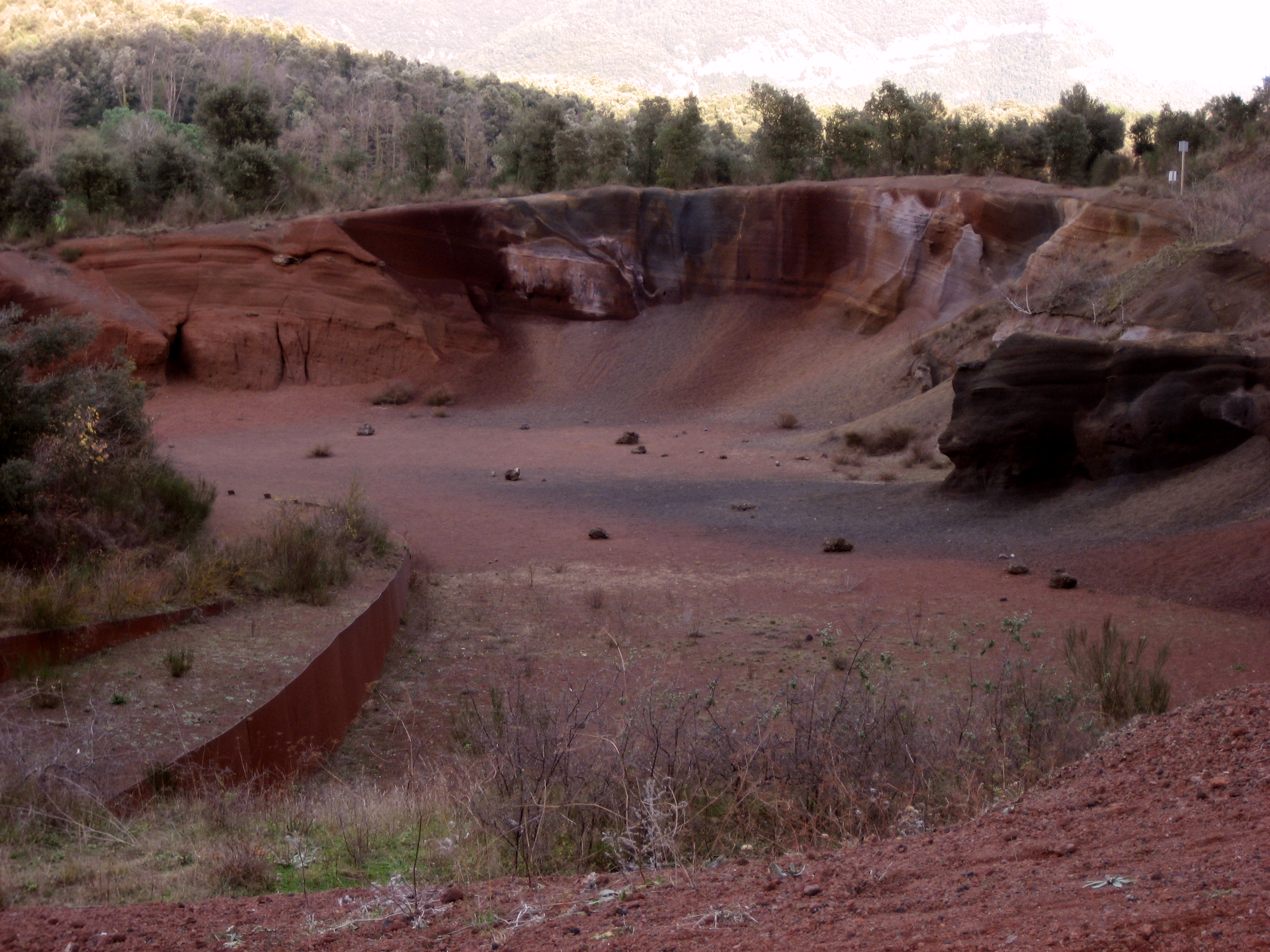

== See also ==
- Zona Volcànica de la Garrotxa Natural Park
- List of volcanoes in Spain
- Tossol
- Santa Margarida Volcano
- Fageda d'en Jordà
- Lists of volcanoes
