= UD Villa de Santa Brígida B =

Spanish football club

Villa Santa Brígida B
- Full name: Unión Deportiva Villa de Santa Brígida B
- Founded: 2004
- Dissolved: 2009
- Ground: El Guiniguada, Santa Brígida, Canary Islands, Spain
- Capacity: 800
- 2008–09: 3ª - Group 12, 16th
Home colours	Away colours

Unión Deportiva Villa de Santa Brígida B was a football team based in Santa Brígida in the autonomous community of Canary Islands.

Founded in 2004 and retired in 2009, the team played the 2008–09 season in the 3ª - Group 12. Its stadium is El Guiniguada with a capacity of 800 seats. It was the reserve team of UD Villa de Santa Brígida.

== History ==
UD Villa de Santa Brígida was founded after the merger of CD Santa Brígida and SD Santa Brígida. While the first team took the place of CD Santa Brígida in Tercera División, the reserve side took the place of SD Santa Brígida in Regional Preferente de Las Palmas.

On 10 July 2009, UD Villa de Santa Brígida announced that reserve team will be dissolved and therefore not take part in Regional Preferente de Las Palmas.

== Season to season ==
Season	Tier	Division	Place
2004–05	5	Int. Pref.	13th
2005–06	5	Int. Pref.	5th
2006–07	5	Int. Pref.	3rd
2007–08	4	3ª	12th
2008–09	4	3ª	16th

- 2 seasons in Tercera División
