= Fageda d'en Jordà =

Forest in Catalonia

Coordinates: 42°08′58″N 2°30′50″E

The Fageda d'en Jordà – in English, the Jordà Beech Forest – is a natural reserve that includes a beech forest with unique characteristics in Catalonia and Spain, as it grows on relatively flat terrain, formed by a cooled lava flow from the volcano del Croscat, at an altitude that is not common in the Mediterranean area of the Iberian Peninsula for this type of forest, between 550 and 650 m. It has an area of about 4.8 km^{2} and its floor is made up of spatter cones (locally called tossols) that can reach more than 20 m in height.

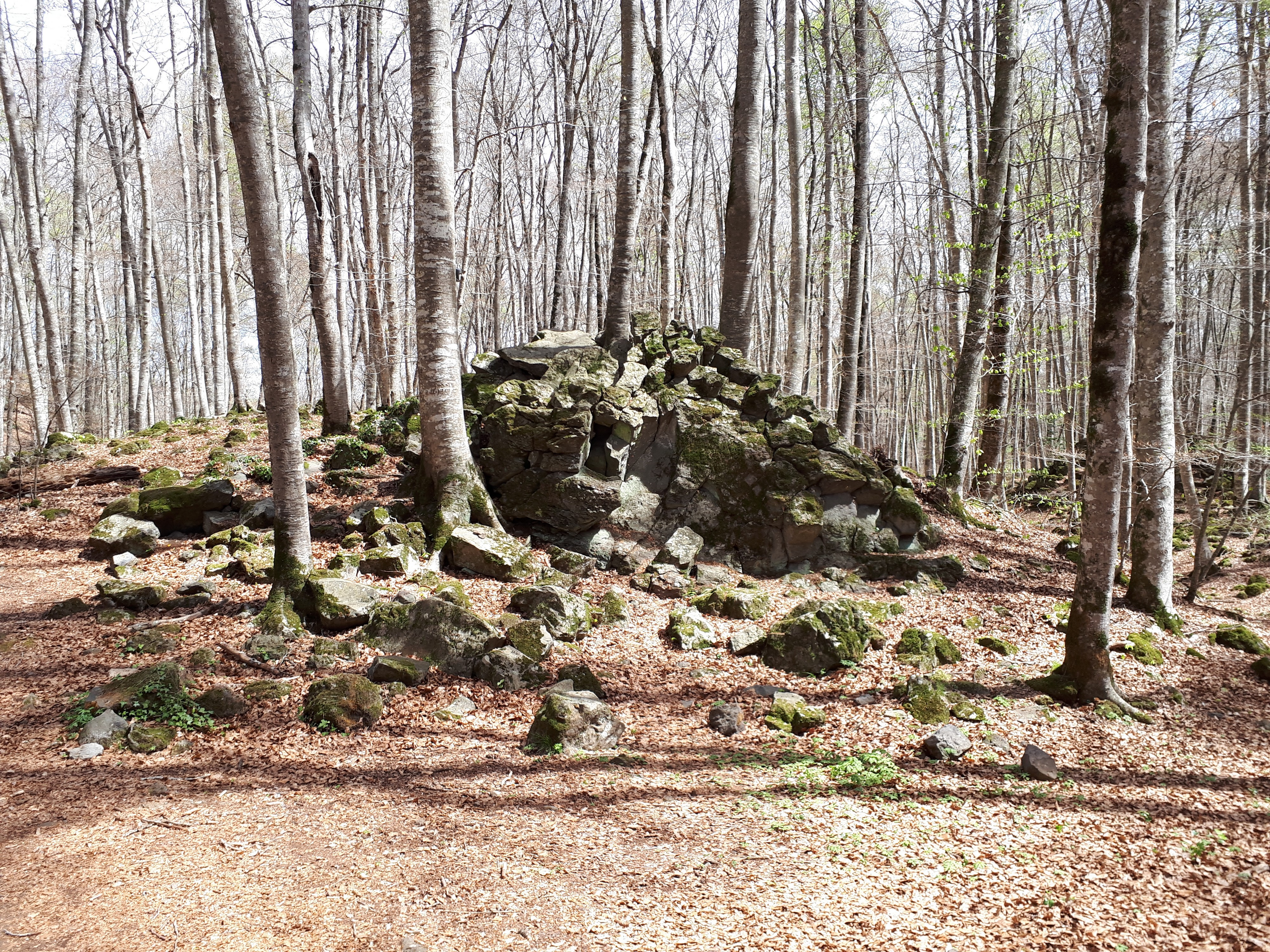
One of the tossols (volcanic spatter cones) in the Fageda d'en Jordà, Garrotxa

The beech forest is famous because the Catalan poet Joan Maragall wrote a well-known poem about it: La fageda d'en Jordà. There is a monolith in the poet's honour at the main entrance to the beech forest, at kilometer 4 of the road from Olot to Santa Pau, at the Can Serra car park. The use of motor vehicles is prohibited within the forest, however, there are several walking routes and you can rent a horse or an old horse-drawn carriage at kilometer 7 of the road from Olot to Santa Pau.

== Location ==
La fageda d'en Jordà is located in the La Garrotxa county, about 5.5 km from Olot. It occupies part of the municipalities of Santa Pau, Olot and Les Preses and is part of the Garrotxa Volcanic Zone natural park. The beech forest is surrounded by several of the 21 volcanoes in the Garrotxa region. At one end of the forest is the Can Jordà farmhouse, which gives it its name, and which today is a Cultivated Plant Conservation Center. Its objective is the cultivation of fruit tree species close to extinction and varieties of plants that have gone into decline, such as some varieties of buckwheat. Within the forest is the La Fageda cooperative, dedicated to the production of dairy products and which employs mentally handicapped people.

== Climate and vegetation ==
The Jordà beech forest is made up almost entirely of medium and large beech trees on land that has not been plowed for many years, although you can still see the old paths from old farms and forestry activities. The beech (Fagus sylvatica) trees benefit from a generous climate, abundant in rain (900 to 1000 mm), cool, with a Mediterranean transition from humid mountain to Atlantic coast, facing slightly north, with a substrate of relatively recent reddish clays, andosols and other brown soils in which these trees grow easily.
