= Tossol =

Geological features

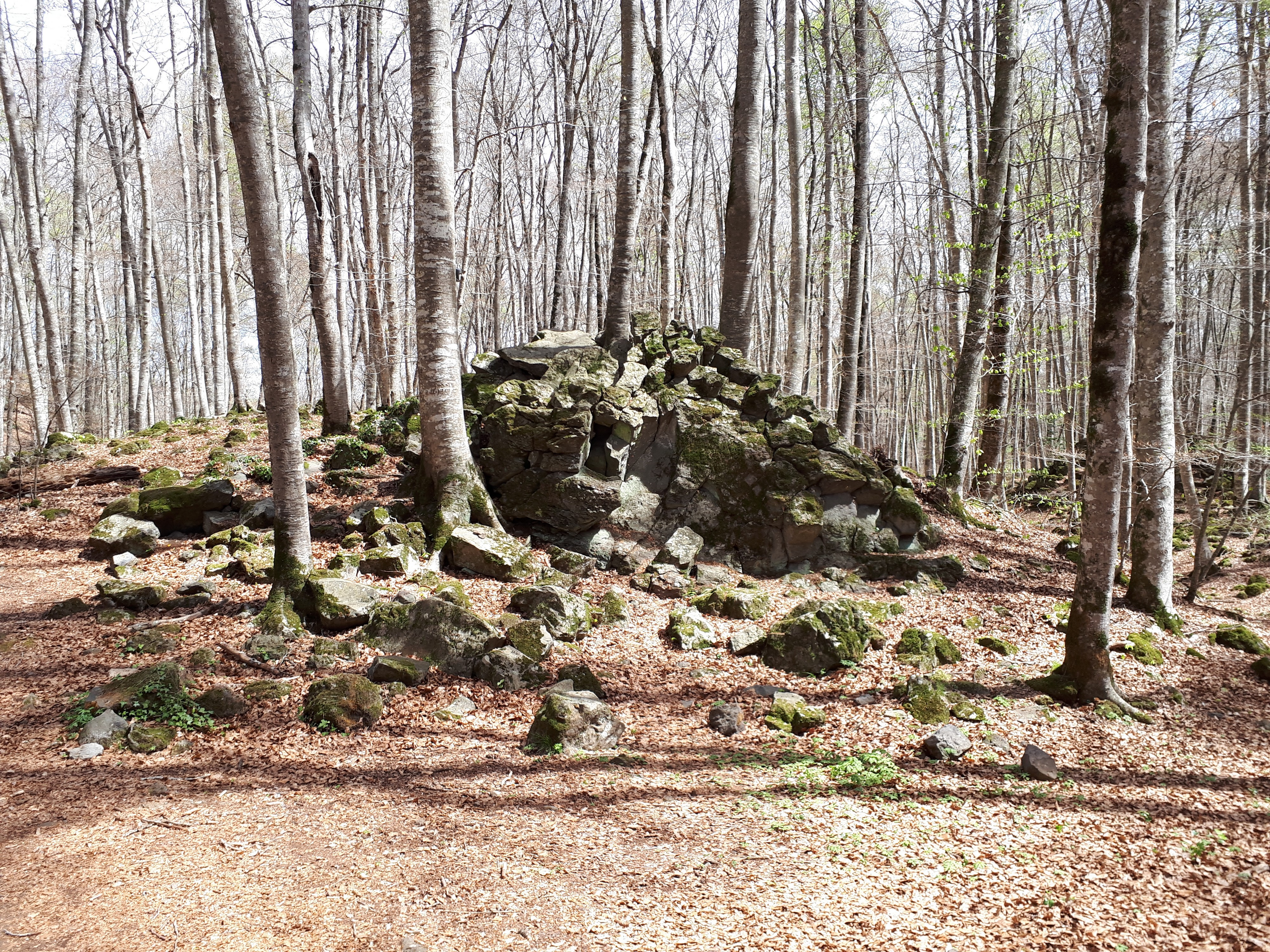
One of the tossols we can visit in the Fageda d'en Jordà, Garrotxa.

Tossol is a Catalan word (hillock) used to refer to protuberances that form in lava flows and that when the lava cools become small hills. In the Jordà beech forest (in the Garrotxa Volcanic Zone Natural Park, in Catalonia, Spain) there are more than 50 tossols (spatter cones) formed by the interaction between lava flows and pre-existing wetlands that, when covered by lava at more than 1000 °C, boiled with large bubbles that raised and deformed the flow forming the tossols. These in the Garrotxa Volcanic Zone are found in three lava flows, that of the Croscat volcano (Jordà beech forest), that of the Puig Jordà volcano (Tosca Forest), that of the Montolivet volcano (Pla de Dalt) and the lava flow located in La Moixina and the Parc Nou in Olot.

== Bibliography ==
- Francis, Pete & Oppenheymer, Clive. 2015. Volcanoes. Oxford University Press. 496 p. ISBN 9780199254699.
