= Bandama Caldera =

Mountain and crater in Gran Canaria, Spain

Coordinates: 28°02′0″N 15°27′20″W

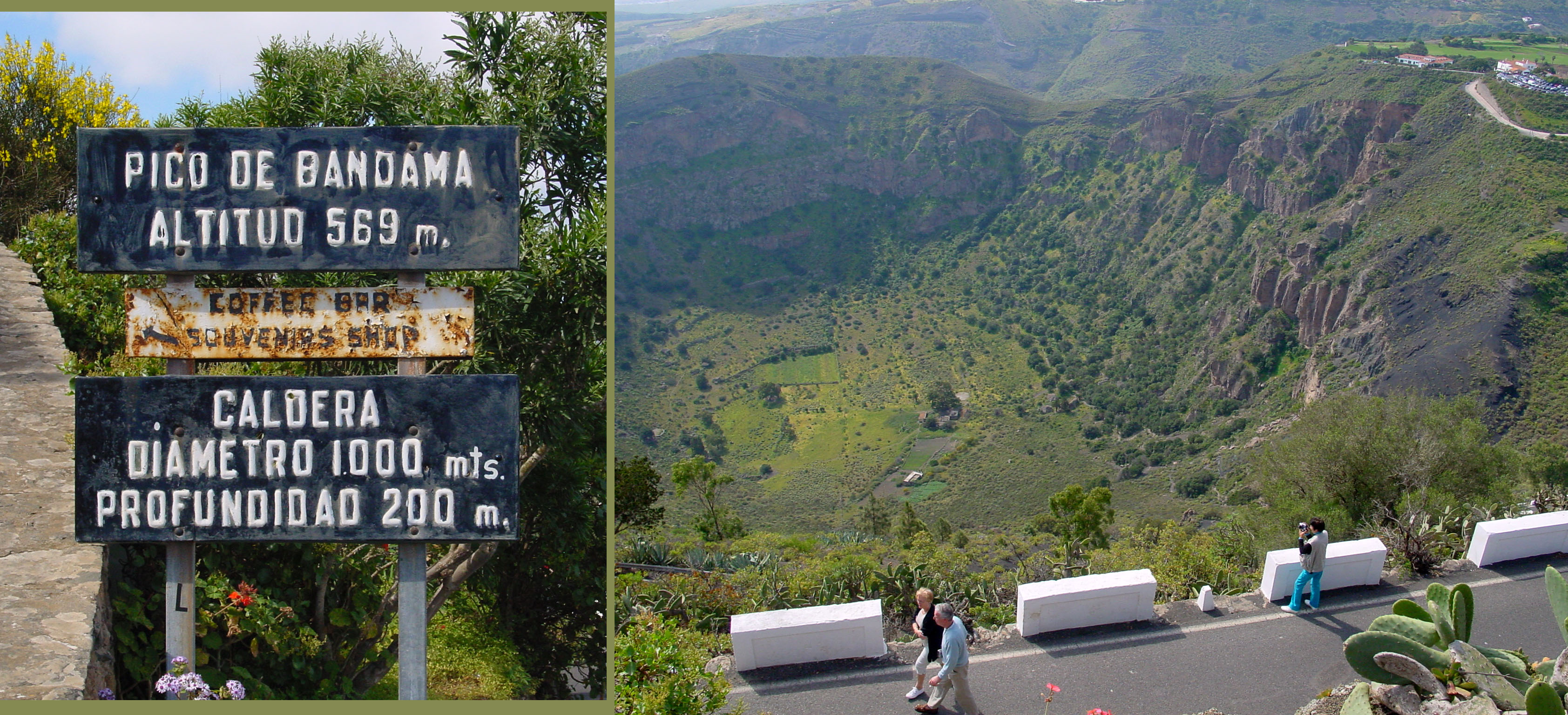
Bandama Caldera, Gran Canaria

The Bandama Natural Monument is part of the Tafira Protected Landscape on the island of Gran Canaria in the Canary Islands, Spain. It is considered a point of geological interest, because of the Caldera de Bandama. This volcanic crater, which is geologically a maar rather than a caldera, reaches 569 m (1,867 ft) above sea level at the highest point on its rim, Pico de Bandama, and is about 1,000 m (3,300 ft) wide and 200 m (700 ft) deep. The crater was developed during the last heavy eruptions 2000 years ago. It is recorded as the most recent volcanic activity on Gran Canaria.

The bottom of the caldera contains volcanic ash of different colors, and some botanic species of Canary Islands origin. Inside the caldera can be found an endemic bush, Dama de Bandama (Parolinia glabriuscula), that grows nowhere else.

The Caldera de Bandama is located at the meeting point of three municipalities: Las Palmas de Gran Canaria, Santa Brígida and Telde.

== Gallery ==
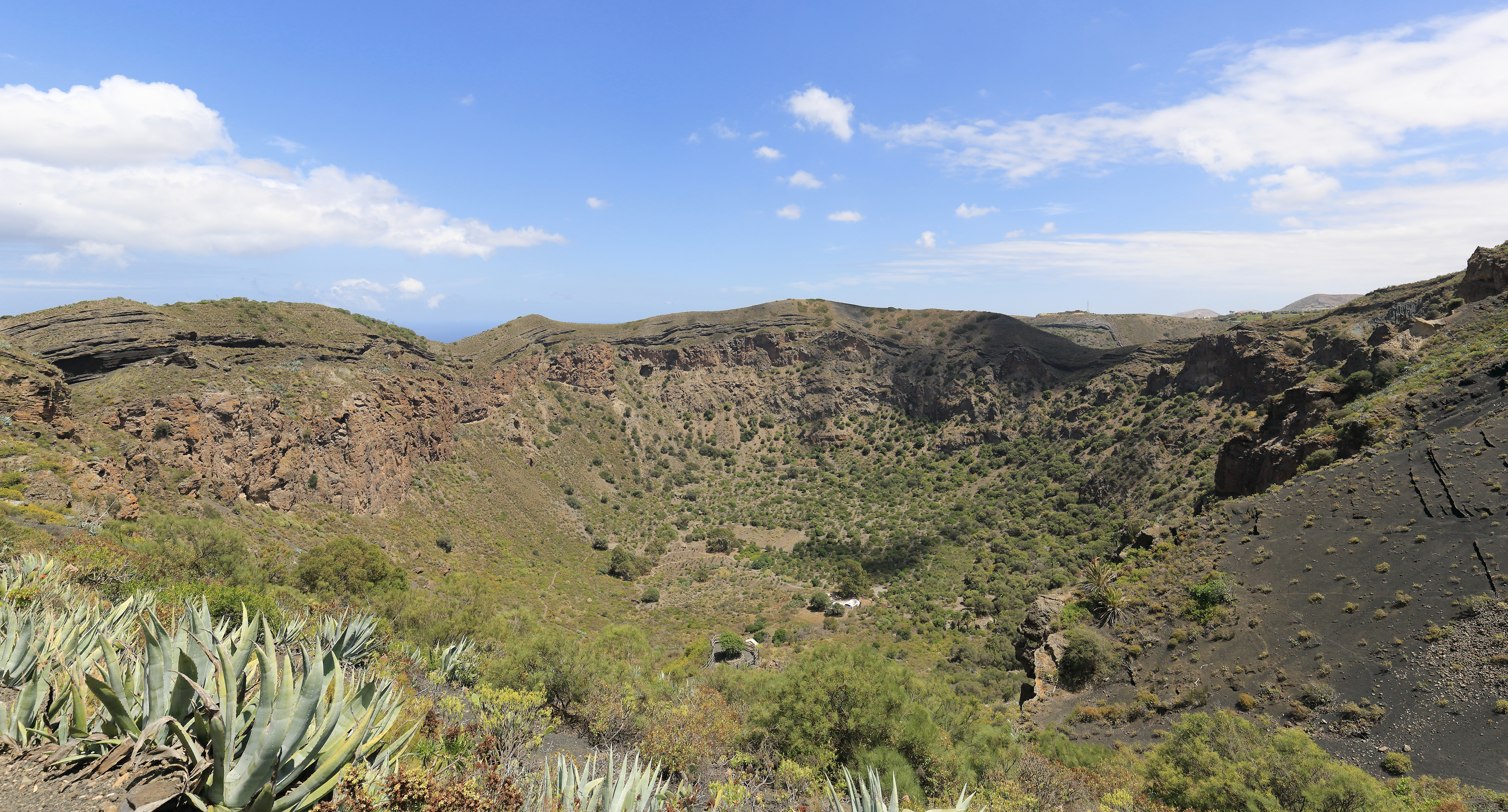
Caldera de Bandama, Gran Canaria

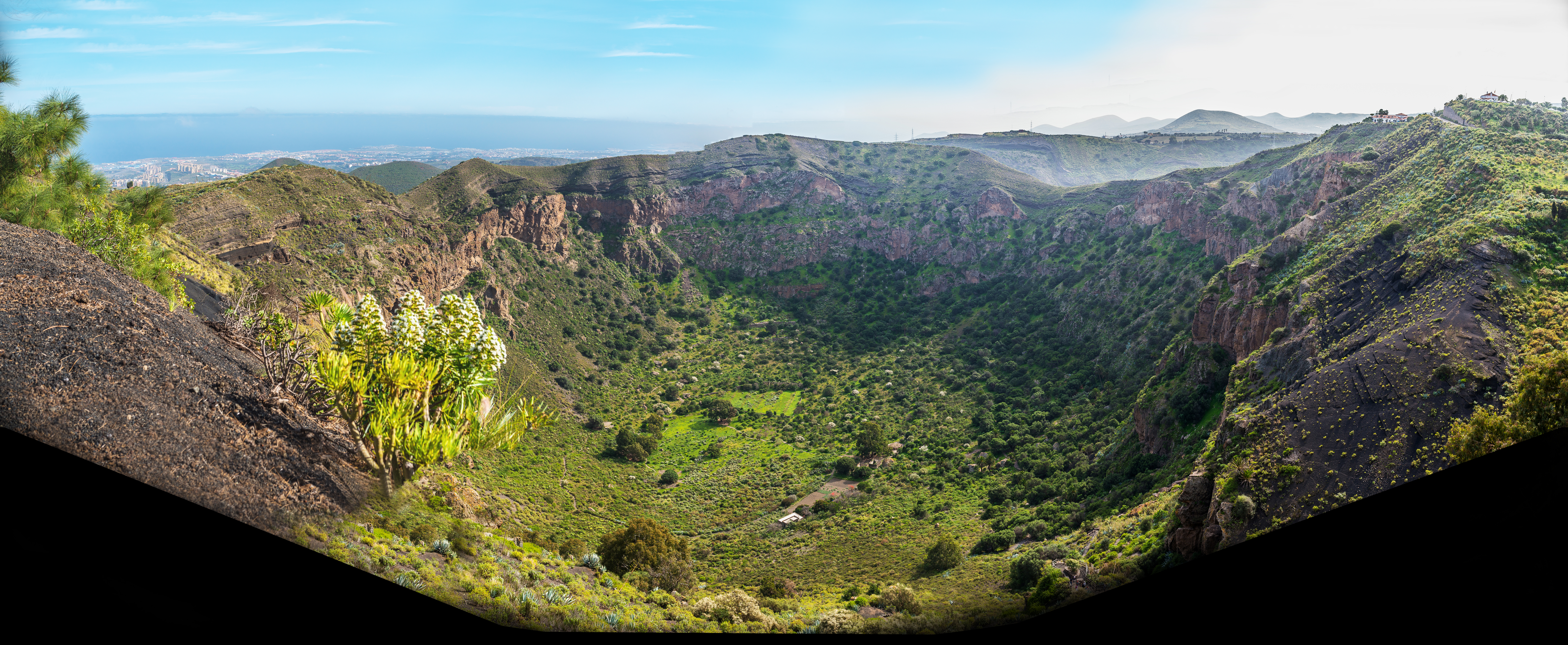
Caldera de Bandama, 2016

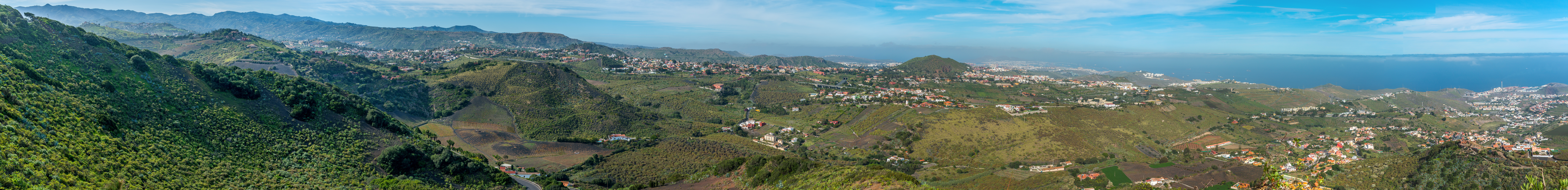
View toward the northeast from Pico de Bandama, 2016
