= Santa Brígida, Las Palmas =

Santa Brígida Sataute
- Municipality
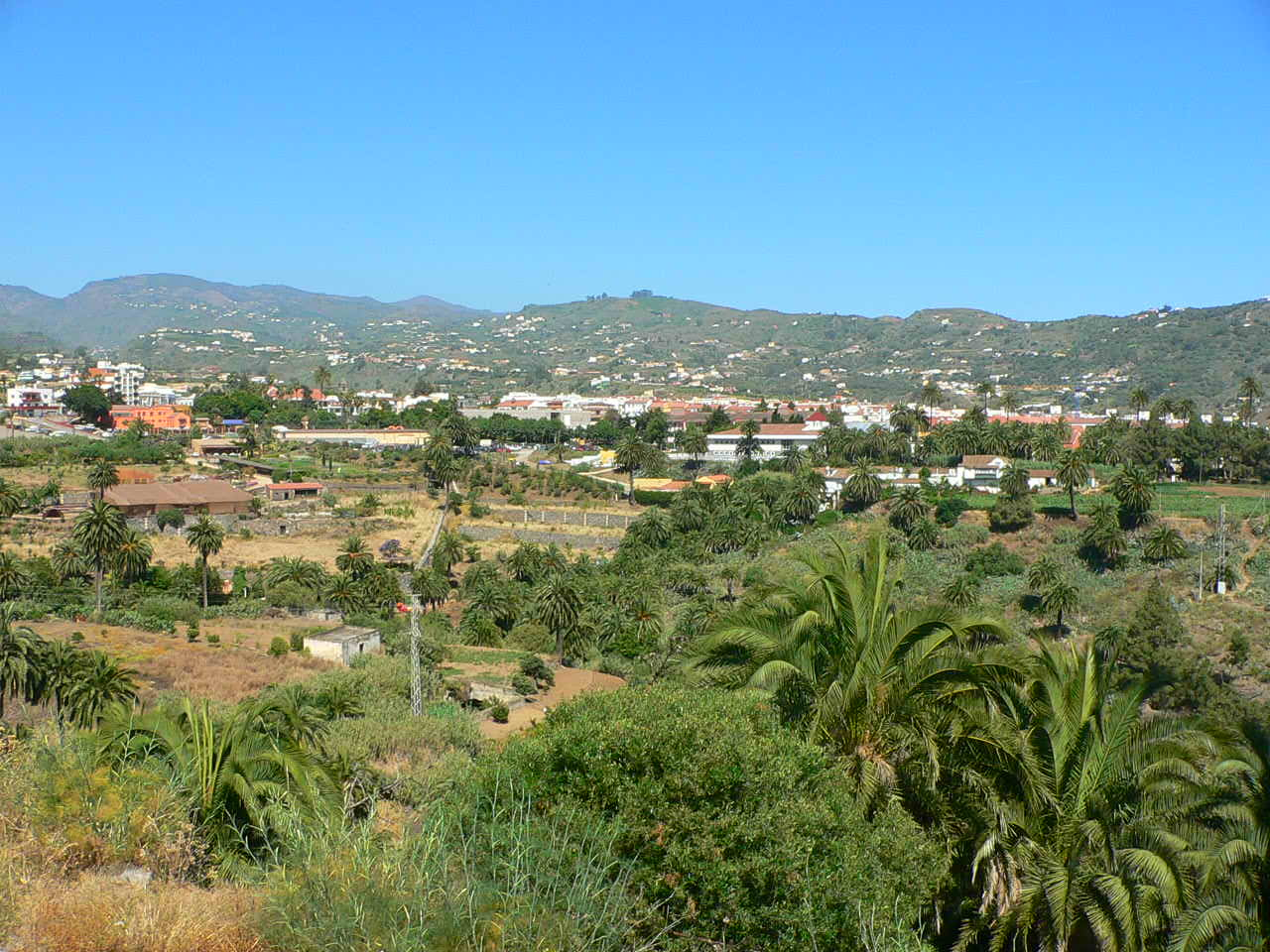
- Santa Brígida

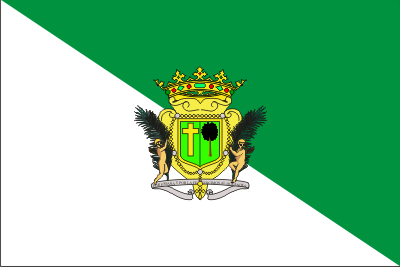
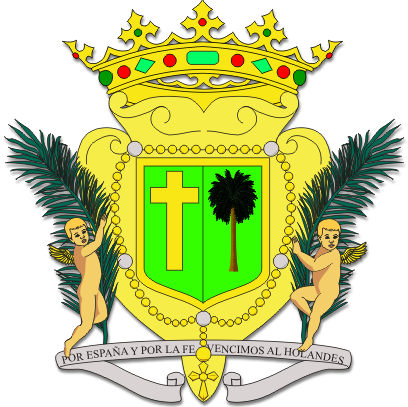
- Flag Coat of arms
- Motto: "Por España y por la Fe vencimos al Holandés"
- Municipal location in Gran Canaria

- Location in the province of Las Palmas Santa Brígida (Canary Islands) Santa Brígida (Spain, Canary Islands)
- Coordinates: 28°2′2″N 15°29′59″W
- Country: Spain
- Autonomous Community: Canary Islands
- Province: Las Palmas
- Island: Gran Canaria

Government
  - Mayor: José Armando Armengol Martín (Ando Sataute)

Area
  - Total: 23.81 km^{2} (9.19 sq mi)
- Elevation (AMSL): 520 m (1,710 ft)

Population (2025-01-01)
  - Total: 18,766
  - Density: 788.2/km^{2} (2,041/sq mi)
- Demonym: Satauteño/ña
- Time zone: UTC+0 (CET)
  - Summer (DST): UTC+1 (CEST (GMT +1))
- Postal code: 35300
- Area code: +34 (Spain) + 928 (Las Palmas)
- Website: www.santabrigida.es

Santa Brígida is a municipality in the northeastern part of the island of Gran Canaria in the Province of Las Palmas of the Canary Islands. Its population is 18,791 (2013), and the area is 23.81 km^{2}. It borders Las Palmas to the west and is part of its urban area.

== Historical population ==
Historical population

Year	Pop.	±%
1991	12,199	—
1996	16,809	+37.8%
2001	17,598	+4.7%
2002	18,719	+6.4%

Year	Pop.	±%
2003	18,817	+0.5%
2004	18,599	−1.2%
2013	18,971	+2.0%

== Sites of interest ==
- Bandama Caldera (The Caldera de Bandama Natural Monument), part of the Tafira Protected Landscape. This volcanic caldera reaches 569 m (1,867 ft) above sea level at the highest point on its rim, Pico de Bandama, and is about 1,000 m (3,300 ft) wide and 200 m (660 ft) deep. The steep walk to the bottom of the caldera takes about half an hour. Volcanic ash of different hues is in great abundance, and there are some interesting botanic species of Canary Islands origin.
- Archaeological sites in Santa Brígida. In the valley of La Angostura and Las Meleguinas one can find numerous traces of Aboriginal Canarians that have prompted the declaration of the area as a Cultural, as groups of caves carved into rock, silos or sidewalks. In the archaeological site of El Tope, discovered on 16 July 1988, where you can see remnants that suggest the existence of an aboriginal burial mound, as well as ceramics, pottery and curious pintaderas. It has been discovered Libyan-Berber inscriptions and some vessels (which are now in the Museo Canario). Also in the same area in the wall of the volcano is the Cueva de Los Frailes, a set of 37 caves discovered in 1933.

== Panorama ==
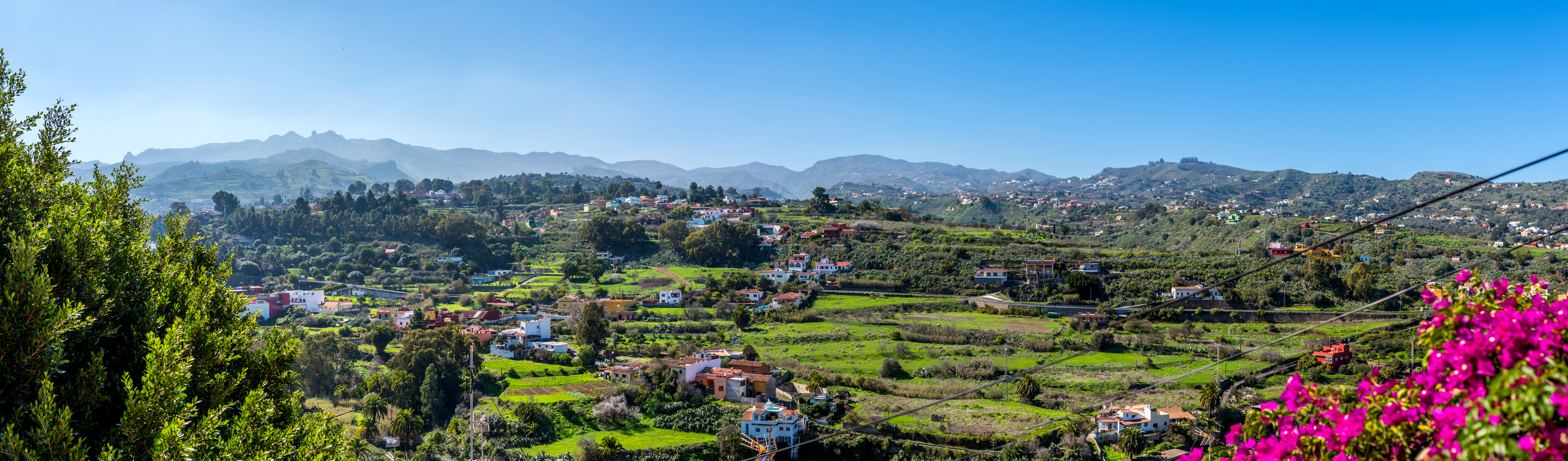
Santa Brígida
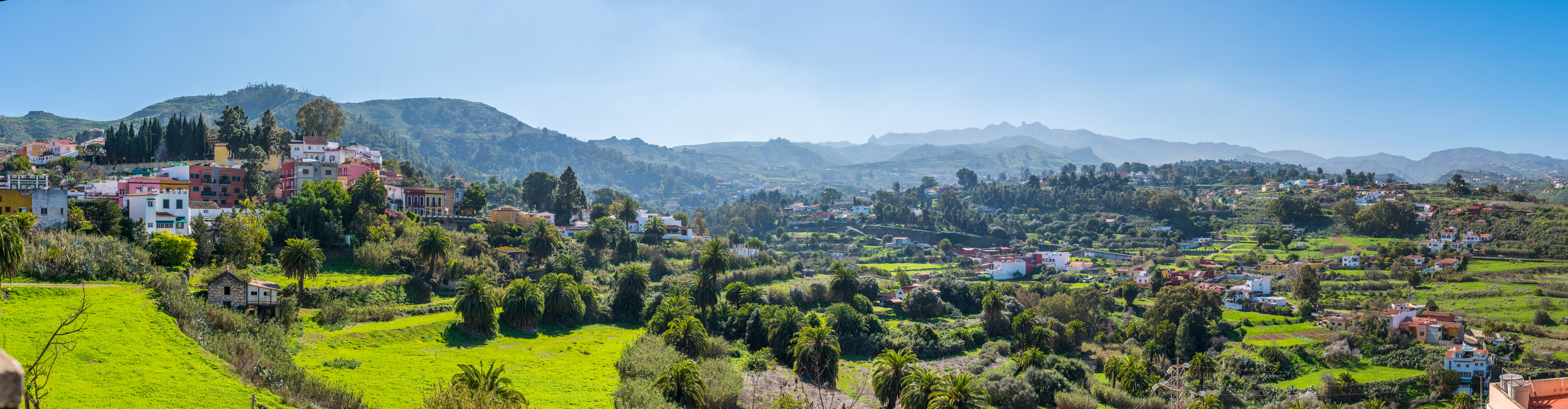
Santa Brígida
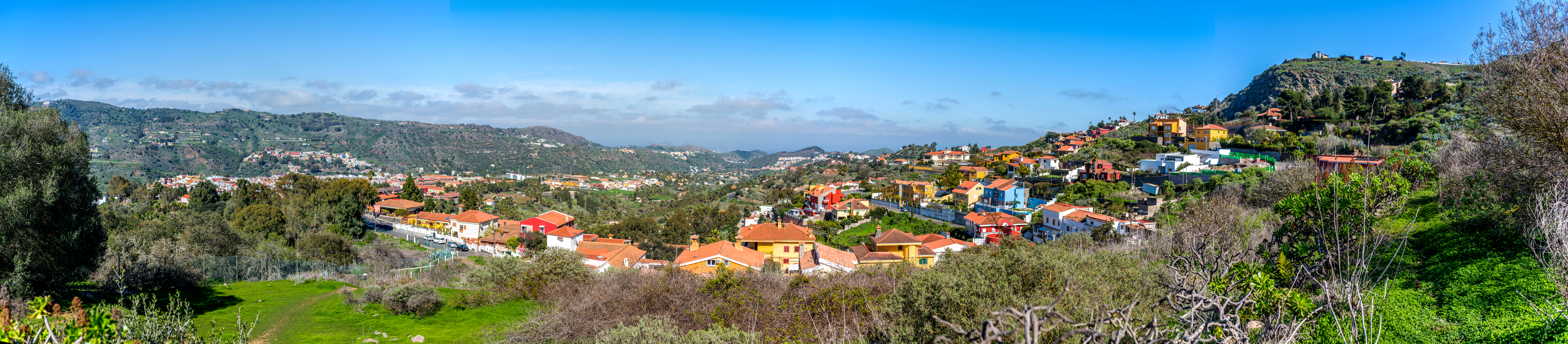
Santa Brígida

== People from Santa Brígida ==
- Francisco Morales Padrón (1924–2010), historian

== Gallery ==
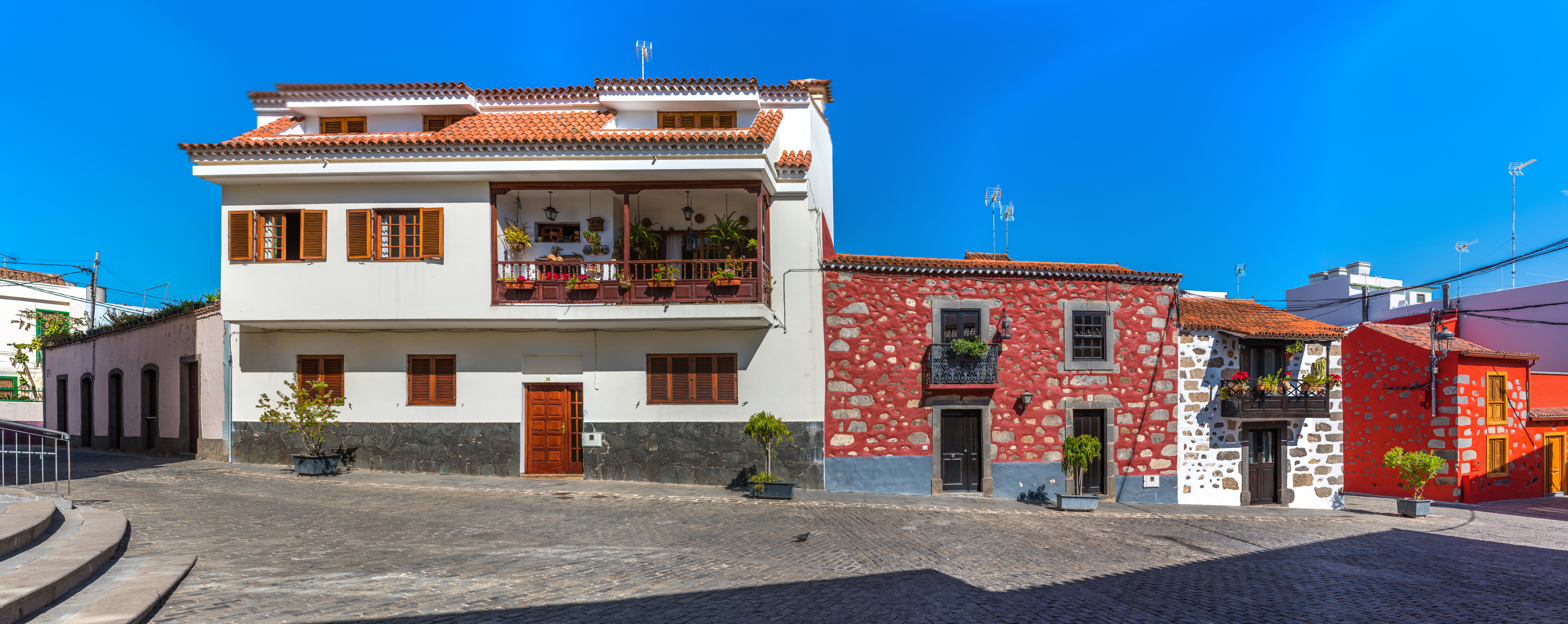
Santa Brígida

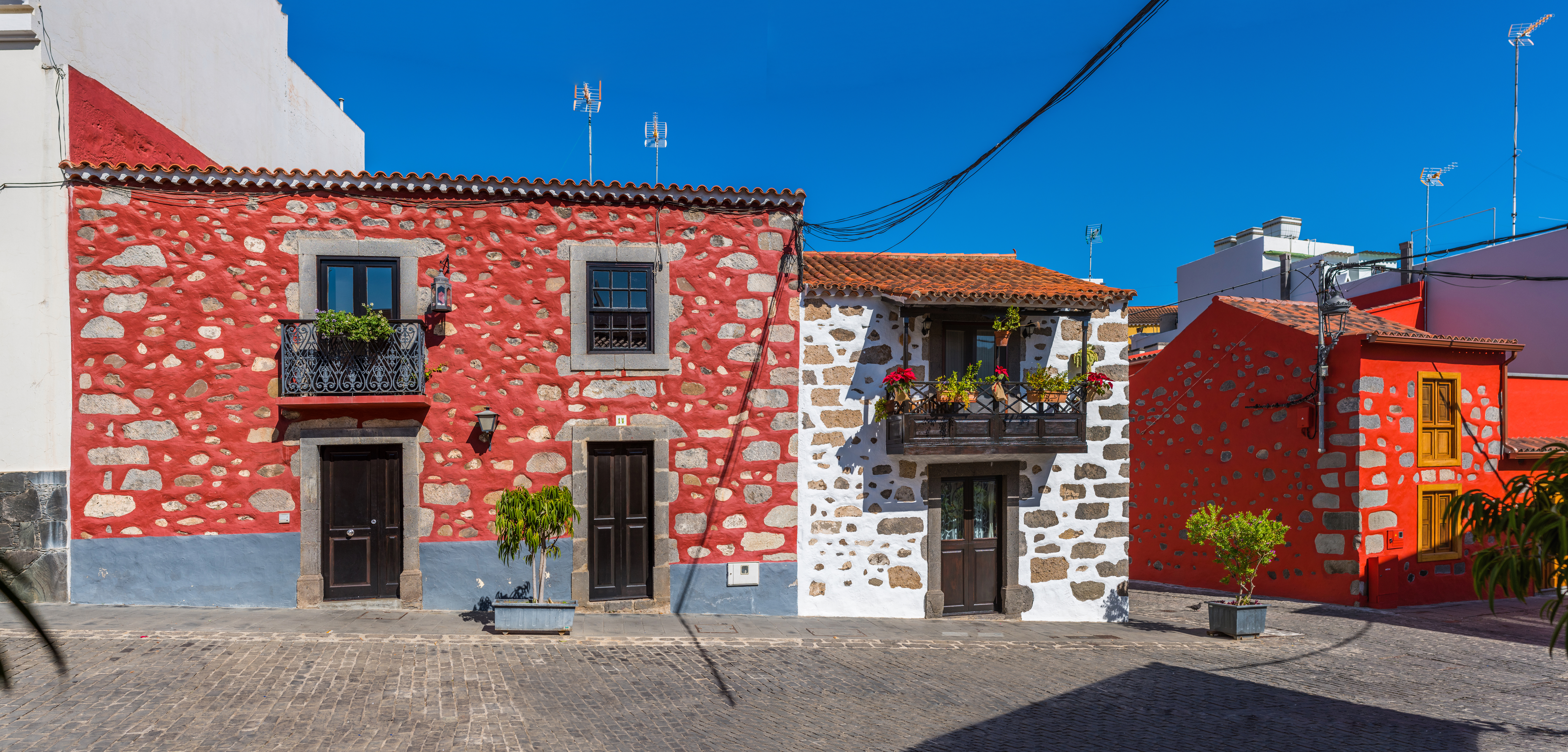
Santa Brígida

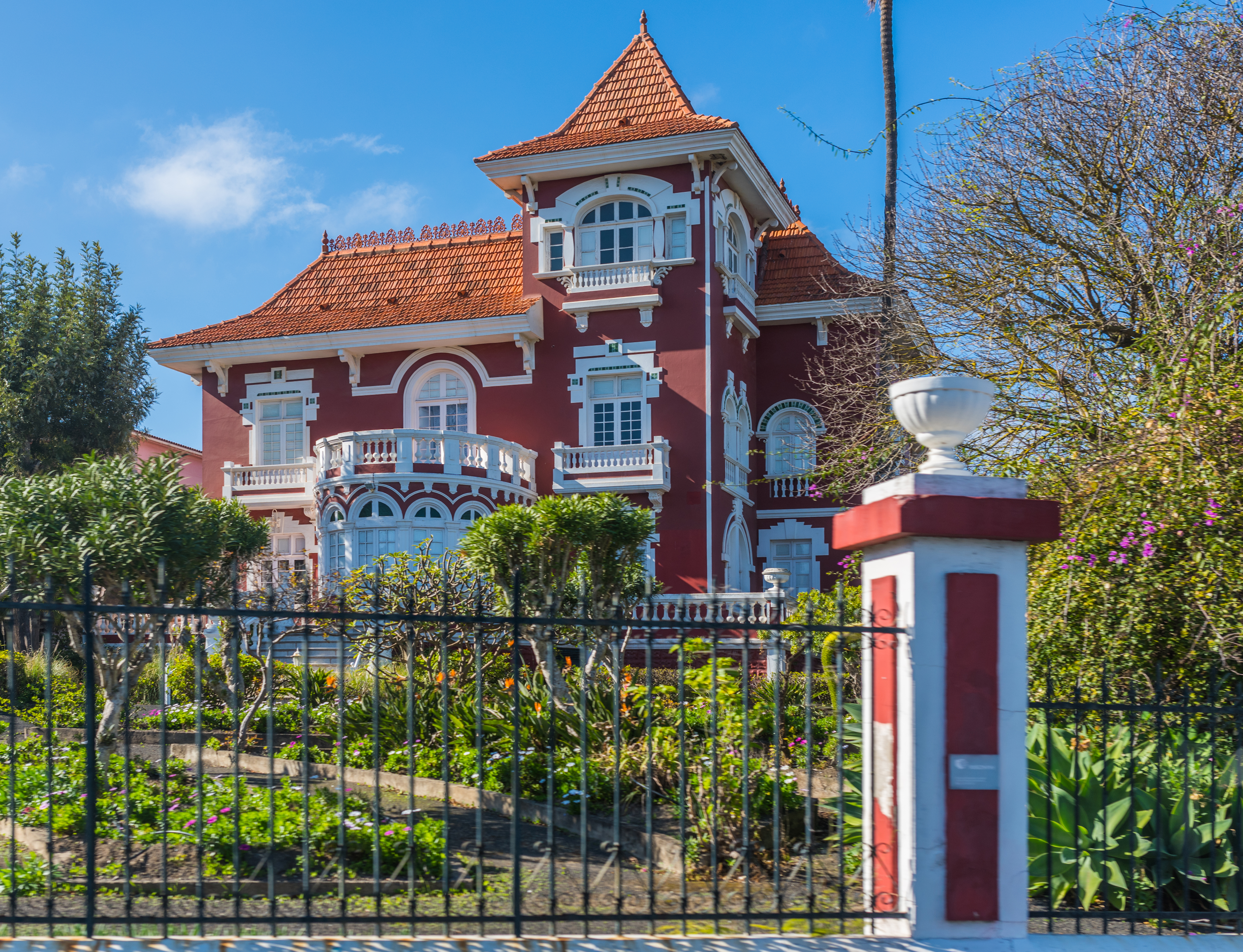
Santa Brígida

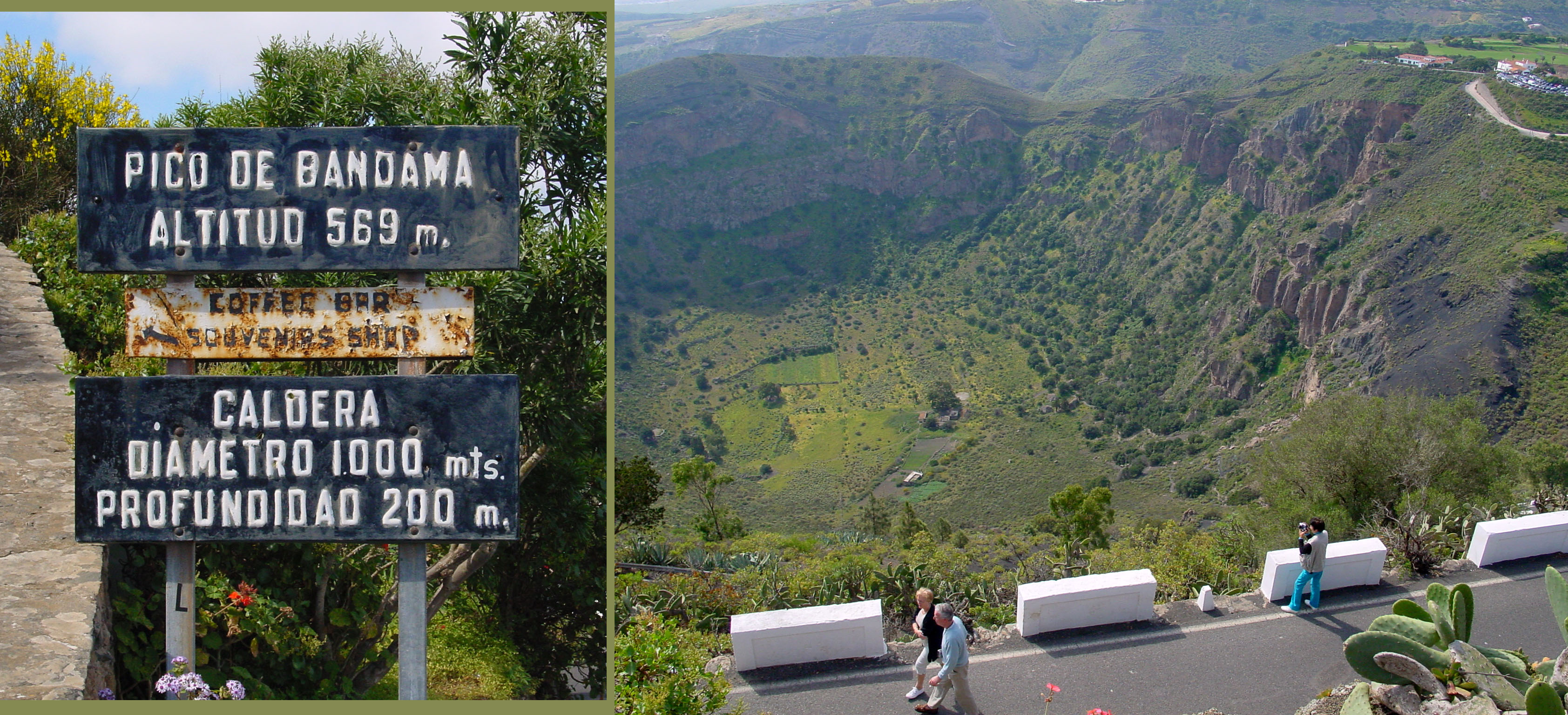
Bandama Caldera

== See also ==
- List of municipalities in Las Palmas
