= Santa Pau =

- Municipality
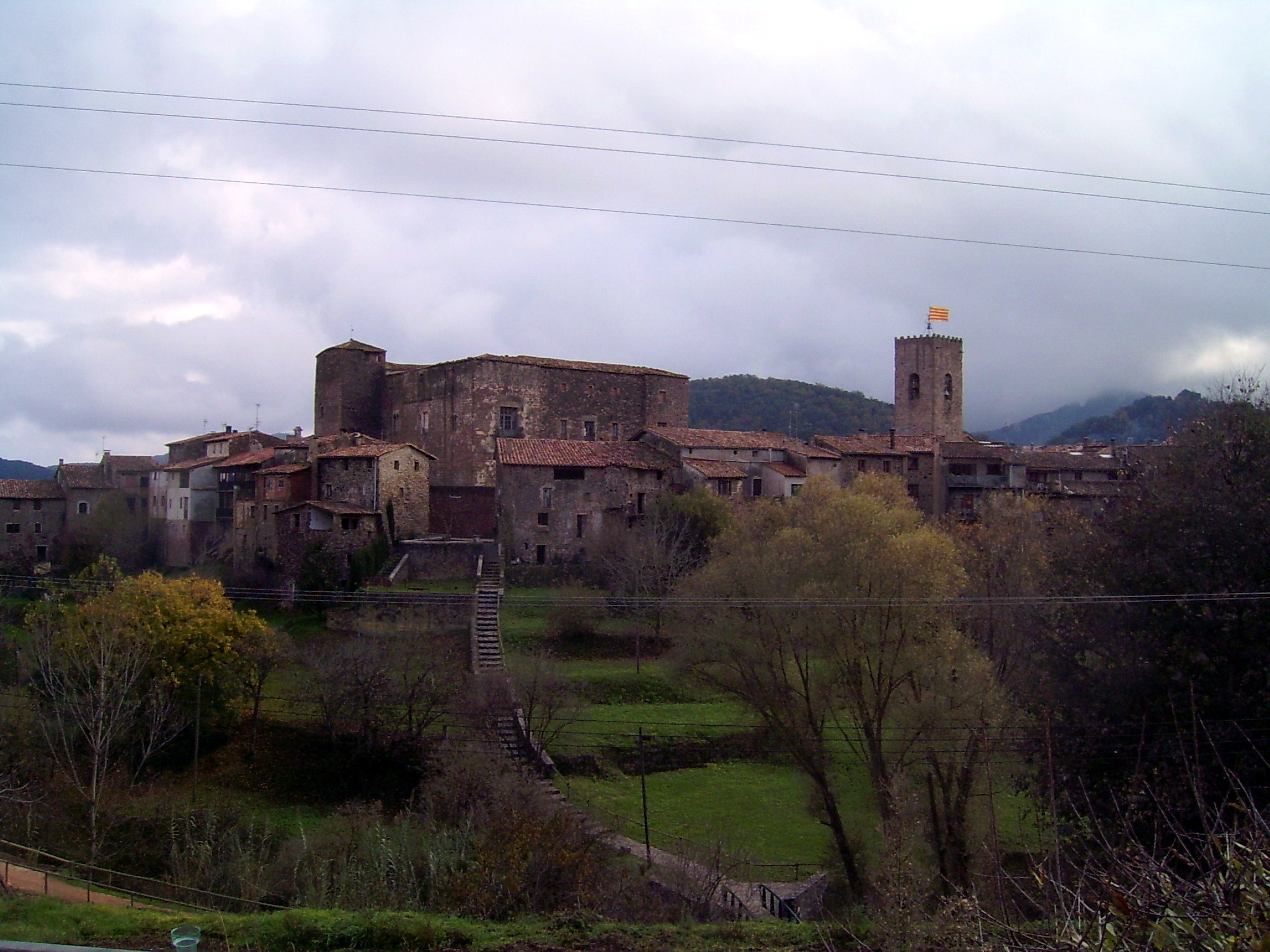
- Castle

- Flag Coat of arms

- Location in Catalonia Santa Pau (Spain)
- Coordinates: 42°9′N 2°34′E
- Country: Spain
- Community: Catalonia
- Province: Girona
- Comarca: Garrotxa

Government
  - mayor: Pep Companys Güell (2015)

Area
  - Total: 49.0 km^{2} (18.9 sq mi)

Population (2025-01-01)
  - Total: 1,579
  - Density: 32.2/km^{2} (83.5/sq mi)
- Website: www.santapau.cat

Santa Pau (Catalan pronunciation: [ˈsantə ˈpaw]) is a village and municipality in the province of Girona and autonomous community of Catalonia, Spain.
