= List of Sites of Community Importance in La Rioja =

This is a list of Sites of Community Importance in La Rioja.

ID	Name	Coordinates	Image
ES0000062	Obarenes-Sierra de Cantabria (official name: Obarenes-Sierra de Cantabria); Other names: n/a	42.6319°N 2.9625°W	Looks like this Site of Community Interest has an image. Don't worry, you can take one of your own, and upload it too!
ES0000063	Sierra de Alcarama y Valle del Alhama (official name: Sierra de Alcarama y Valle del Alhama); Other names: n/a	41.9694°N 1.9889°W	Looks like this Site of Community Interest has an image. Don't worry, you can take one of your own, and upload it too!
ES0000064	Peñas de Iregua, Leza y Jubera (official name: Peñas de Iregua, Leza y Jubera); Other names: n/a	42.3153°N 2.3778°W	Looks like this Site of Community Interest has an image. Don't worry, you can take one of your own, and upload it too!
ES0000065	Peñas de Arnedillo. Peñalmonte y Peña Isasa (official name: Peñas de Arnedillo. Peñalmonte y Peña Isasa); Other names: n/a	42.1736°N 2.1597°W	Looks like this Site of Community Interest has an image. Don't worry, you can take one of your own, and upload it too!
ES0000067	Sierras de Demanda, Urbión, Cebollera y Cameros (official name: Sierras de Demanda, Urbión, Cebollera y Cameros); Other names: n/a	42.2083°N 2.8205°W	Looks like this Site of Community Interest has an image. Don't worry, you can take one of your own, and upload it too!
ES2300006	Sotos y Riberas del Ebro (official name: Sotos y Riberas del Ebro); Other names: n/a	42.2°N 1.7333°W	Looks like this Site of Community Interest has an image. Don't worry, you can take one of your own, and upload it too!

== See also ==
- List of Sites of Community Importance in Spain
