= List of Sites of Community Importance in Asturias =

This is a list of Sites of Community Importance in Asturias.

ID	Name	Coordinates	Image
ES0000054	Somiedo (official name: Somiedo); Other names: n/a	43.0971°N 6.2492°W	Looks like this Site of Community Interest has an image. Don't worry, you can take one of your own, and upload it too!
ES0000317	Penarronda-Barayo (official name: Penarronda-Barayo); Other names: n/a	43.5619°N 6.7998°W	Looks like this Site of Community Interest has an image. Don't worry, you can take one of your own, and upload it too!
ES0000319	Ría de Ribadesella-Ría de Tinamayor (official name: Ría de Ribadesella-Ría de Tinamayor); Other names: n/a	43.407°N 4.6541°W	Looks like this Site of Community Interest has an image. Don't worry, you can take one of your own, and upload it too!
ES1200001	Picos de Europa (Asturias) (official name: Picos de Europa (Asturias)); Other names: n/a	43.2234°N 4.8183°W	Looks like this Site of Community Interest has an image. Don't worry, you can take one of your own, and upload it too!
ES1200002	Muniellos (official name: Muniellos); Other names: n/a	43.0124°N 6.6979°W	Looks like this Site of Community Interest has an image. Don't worry, you can take one of your own, and upload it too!
ES1200006	Ría de Villaviciosa (official name: Ría de Villaviciosa); Other names: n/a	43.5196°N 5.3924°W	Looks like this Site of Community Interest has an image. Don't worry, you can take one of your own, and upload it too!
ES1200007	Cueva Rosa (official name: Cueva Rosa); Other names: n/a	43.44300000000001°N 5.1321°W	Looks like this Site of Community Interest has an image. Don't worry, you can take one of your own, and upload it too!
ES1200008	Redes Natural Park (official name: Redes Natural Park); Other names: n/a	43.1683°N 5.3571°W	Looks like this Site of Community Interest has an image. Don't worry, you can take one of your own, and upload it too!
ES1200009	Ponga-Amieva (official name: Ponga-Amieva); Other names: n/a	43.2064°N 5.1594°W	Looks like this Site of Community Interest has an image. Don't worry, you can take one of your own, and upload it too!
ES1200010	Montovo-La Mesa (official name: Montovo-La Mesa); Other names: n/a	43.155°N 6.1738°W	Looks like this Site of Community Interest has an image. Don't worry, you can take one of your own, and upload it too!
ES1200011	Peña Ubiña (official name: Peña Ubiña); Other names: n/a	43.0615°N 5.9215°W	Looks like this Site of Community Interest has an image. Don't worry, you can take one of your own, and upload it too!
ES1200012	Caldoveiro (official name: Caldoveiro); Other names: n/a	43.2275°N 6.0992°W	Looks like this Site of Community Interest has an image. Don't worry, you can take one of your own, and upload it too!
ES1200014	Sierra de los Lagos (official name: Sierra de los Lagos); Other names: n/a	43.1933°N 6.6698°W	This Site of Community Interest has no photo. Take one and upload it! Thanks!
ES1200016	Ría de Ribadeo (official name: Ría de Ribadeo); Other names: Ría del Eo	43.545°N 7.0202°W	Looks like this Site of Community Interest has an image. Don't worry, you can take one of your own, and upload it too!
ES1200022	Playa de Vega (official name: Playa de Vega); Other names: n/a	43.4806°N 5.1359°W	Looks like this Site of Community Interest has an image. Don't worry, you can take one of your own, and upload it too!
ES1200023	Río Eo (Asturias) (official name: Río Eo (Asturias)); Other names: n/a	43.4221°N 7.1329°W	Looks like this Site of Community Interest has an image. Don't worry, you can take one of your own, and upload it too!
ES1200024	Río Porcía (official name: Río Porcía); Other names: n/a	43.5309°N 6.8775°W	This Site of Community Interest has no photo. Take one and upload it! Thanks!
ES1200025	Río Navia (official name: Río Navia); Other names: n/a	43.485°N 6.7231°W	Looks like this Site of Community Interest has an image. Don't worry, you can take one of your own, and upload it too!
ES1200026	[[Río Negro]] (official name: Río Negro); Other names: n/a	43.5031°N 6.5578°W	Looks like this Site of Community Interest has an image. Don't worry, you can take one of your own, and upload it too!
ES1200027	Río Esva (official name: Río Esva); Other names: n/a	43.4864°N 6.4359°W	Looks like this Site of Community Interest has an image. Don't worry, you can take one of your own, and upload it too!
ES1200028	Río Esqueiro (official name: Río Esqueiro); Other names: n/a	43.5618°N 6.2263°W	Looks like this Site of Community Interest has an image. Don't worry, you can take one of your own, and upload it too!
ES1200029	Río Nalón (official name: Río Nalón); Other names: n/a	43.3928°N 6.009°W	Looks like this Site of Community Interest has an image. Don't worry, you can take one of your own, and upload it too!
ES1200030	Río Narcea (official name: Río Narcea); Other names: n/a	43.3646°N 6.1563°W	Looks like this Site of Community Interest has an image. Don't worry, you can take one of your own, and upload it too!
ES1200031	Río Pigüeña (official name: Río Pigüeña); Other names: n/a	43.3246°N 6.2159°W	Looks like this Site of Community Interest has an image. Don't worry, you can take one of your own, and upload it too!
ES1200032	Río Sella (official name: Río Sella); Other names: n/a	43.3829°N 5.1747°W	Looks like this Site of Community Interest has an image. Don't worry, you can take one of your own, and upload it too!
ES1200033	Río Las Cabras-Bedón (official name: Río Las Cabras-Bedón); Other names: n/a	43.4192°N 4.8908°W	Looks like this Site of Community Interest has an image. Don't worry, you can take one of your own, and upload it too!
ES1200034	Río Purón (official name: Río Purón); Other names: n/a	43.3851°N 4.6988°W	Looks like this Site of Community Interest has an image. Don't worry, you can take one of your own, and upload it too!
ES1200035	Río Cares-Deva (official name: Río Cares-Deva); Other names: n/a	43.3165°N 4.7067°W	Looks like this Site of Community Interest has an image. Don't worry, you can take one of your own, and upload it too!
ES1200036	Alcornocales del Navia (official name: Alcornocales del Navia); Other names: n/a	43.2887°N 6.8264°W	This Site of Community Interest has no photo. Take one and upload it! Thanks!
ES1200037	Aller-Lena (official name: Aller-Lena); Other names: n/a	43.0467°N 5.5885°W	Looks like this Site of Community Interest has an image. Don't worry, you can take one of your own, and upload it too!
ES1200038	Carbayera de El Tragamón (official name: Carbayera de El Tragamón); Other names: n/a	43.5195°N 5.6216°W	Looks like this Site of Community Interest has an image. Don't worry, you can take one of your own, and upload it too!
ES1200039	Cuencas Mineras (Asturias) (official name: Cuencas Mineras (Asturias)); Other names: n/a	43.2133°N 5.6049°W	Looks like this Site of Community Interest has an image. Don't worry, you can take one of your own, and upload it too!
ES1200040	Meandros del Nora (official name: Meandros del Nora); Other names: n/a	43.3798°N 5.9628°W	Looks like this Site of Community Interest has an image. Don't worry, you can take one of your own, and upload it too!
ES1200041	Peña Manteca-Genestaza (official name: Peña Manteca-Genestaza); Other names: n/a	43.2409°N 6.3005°W	Looks like this Site of Community Interest has an image. Don't worry, you can take one of your own, and upload it too!
ES1200042	Sierra Plana de la Borbolla (official name: Sierra Plana de la Borbolla); Other names: n/a	43.3871°N 4.6405°W	This Site of Community Interest has no photo. Take one and upload it! Thanks!
ES1200043	Sierra del Sueve (official name: Sierra del Sueve); Other names: n/a	43.4261°N 5.2489°W	Looks like this Site of Community Interest has an image. Don't worry, you can take one of your own, and upload it too!
ES1200044	Turbera de la Molina (official name: Turbera de la Molina); Other names: n/a	43.3818°N 6.3301°W	This Site of Community Interest has no photo. Take one and upload it! Thanks!
ES1200045	Turbera de Las Dueñas (official name: Turbera de Las Dueñas); Other names: n/a	43.5616°N 6.1702°W	Looks like this Site of Community Interest has an image. Don't worry, you can take one of your own, and upload it too!
ES1200046	Valgrande (official name: Valgrande); Other names: n/a	42.9864°N 5.8175°W	Looks like this Site of Community Interest has an image. Don't worry, you can take one of your own, and upload it too!
ES1200047	Yacimientos de Icnitas (official name: Yacimientos de Icnitas); Other names: n/a	43.5531°N 5.5022°W	Looks like this Site of Community Interest has an image. Don't worry, you can take one of your own, and upload it too!
ES1200048	Alto Navia (official name: Alto Navia); Other names: n/a	43.0207°N 6.9619°W	This Site of Community Interest has no photo. Take one and upload it! Thanks!
ES1200049	Cuenca del Agüeira (official name: Cuenca del Agüeira); Other names: n/a	43.2213°N 6.9238°W	Looks like this Site of Community Interest has an image. Don't worry, you can take one of your own, and upload it too!
ES1200050	Cuenca del Alto Narcea (official name: Cuenca del Alto Narcea); Other names: n/a	43.1753°N 6.5512°W	Looks like this Site of Community Interest has an image. Don't worry, you can take one of your own, and upload it too!
ES1200051	Río Ibias (official name: Río Ibias); Other names: n/a	42.987°N 6.7923°W	This Site of Community Interest has no photo. Take one and upload it! Thanks!
ES1200052	Río Trubia (official name: Río Trubia); Other names: n/a	43.28°N 5.9892°W	Looks like this Site of Community Interest has an image. Don't worry, you can take one of your own, and upload it too!
ES1200053	Río del Oro (Spain) (official name: Río del Oro (Spain)); Other names: n/a	43.1984°N 6.7542°W	This Site of Community Interest has no photo. Take one and upload it! Thanks!
ES1200054	Ríos Negro y Aller (official name: Ríos Negro y Aller); Other names: n/a	43.1483°N 5.5969°W	Looks like this Site of Community Interest has an image. Don't worry, you can take one of your own, and upload it too!
ES1200055	Cabo Busto-Luanco (official name: Cabo Busto-Luanco); Other names: n/a	43.5628°N 6.1276°W	Looks like this Site of Community Interest has an image. Don't worry, you can take one of your own, and upload it too!
ES1200056	Fuentes del Narcea, Degaña e Ibias (official name: Fuentes del Narcea, Degaña e Ibias); Other names: n/a	42.99100000000001°N 6.57°W	Looks like this Site of Community Interest has an image. Don't worry, you can take one of your own, and upload it too!

== See also ==
- List of Sites of Community Importance in Spain
