= List of Sites of Community Importance in Castilla–La Mancha =

This is a list of Sites of Community Importance in Castilla–La Mancha.

ID	Name	Coordinates	Image
ES0000013	Tablas de Daimiel (official name: Tablas de Daimiel); Other names: n/a	39.149444°N 3.7075°W	Looks like this Site of Community Interest has an image. Don't worry, you can take one of your own, and upload it too!
ES0000090	Sierra Morena (official name: Sierra Morena); Other names: n/a	38.478333°N 4.028889°W	Looks like this Site of Community Interest has an image. Don't worry, you can take one of your own, and upload it too!
ES0000160	Hoz del río Gritos y páramos de Las Valeras (official name: Hoz del río Gritos y páramos de Las Valeras); Other names: n/a	39.804722°N 2.156111°W	Looks like this Site of Community Interest has an image. Don't worry, you can take one of your own, and upload it too!
ES0000161	Laguna de El Hito (official name: Laguna de El Hito); Other names: n/a	39.872222°N 2.69°W	Looks like this Site of Community Interest has an image. Don't worry, you can take one of your own, and upload it too!
ES0000164	Sierra de Ayllón (official name: Sierra de Ayllón); Other names: n/a	41.115°N 3.2736110000000003°W	Looks like this Site of Community Interest has an image. Don't worry, you can take one of your own, and upload it too!
ES0000165	Valle y salinas del Salado (official name: Valle y salinas del Salado); Other names: n/a	41.08°N 2.7525°W	Looks like this Site of Community Interest has an image. Don't worry, you can take one of your own, and upload it too!
ES0000166	Barranco del Dulce (official name: Barranco del Dulce); Other names: n/a	41.008611°N 2.636389°W	Looks like this Site of Community Interest has an image. Don't worry, you can take one of your own, and upload it too!
ES0000168	Llanuras de Oropesa, Lagartera y Calera y Chozas (official name: Llanuras de Oropesa, Lagartera y Calera y Chozas); Other names: n/a	39.937222°N 5.282778°W	This Site of Community Interest has no photo. Take one and upload it! Thanks!
ES0000169	Río Tajo en Castrejón, islas de Malpica de Tajo y Azután (official name: Río Tajo en Castrejón, islas de Malpica de Tajo y Azután); Other names: n/a	39.851667°N 4.283333°W	Looks like this Site of Community Interest has an image. Don't worry, you can take one of your own, and upload it too!
ES4210001	Hoces del río Júcar (official name: Hoces del río Júcar); Other names: n/a	39.205556°N 1.296389°W	Looks like this Site of Community Interest has an image. Don't worry, you can take one of your own, and upload it too!
ES4210002	La Encantada, El Moral y Los Torreones (official name: La Encantada, El Moral y Los Torreones); Other names: n/a	39.131667°N 2.671944°W	This Site of Community Interest has no photo. Take one and upload it! Thanks!
ES4210004	Lagunas saladas de Pétrola y Salobrejo y complejo lagunar de Corral Rubio (official name: Lagunas saladas de Pétrola y Salobrejo y complejo lagunar de Corral Rubio); Other names: n/a	38.843611°N 1.559444°W	Looks like this Site of Community Interest has an image. Don't worry, you can take one of your own, and upload it too!
ES4210005	Laguna de Los Ojos de Villaverde (official name: Laguna de Los Ojos de Villaverde); Other names: n/a	38.808611°N 2.368611°W	Looks like this Site of Community Interest has an image. Don't worry, you can take one of your own, and upload it too!
ES4210006	Laguna del Arquillo (official name: Laguna del Arquillo); Other names: n/a	38.747222°N 2.3625°W	Looks like this Site of Community Interest has an image. Don't worry, you can take one of your own, and upload it too!
ES4210008	Sierra de Alcaraz y Segura y cañones del Segura y del Mundo (official name: Sierra de Alcaraz y Segura y cañones del Segura y del Mundo); Other names: n/a	38.405833°N 2.246389°W	Looks like this Site of Community Interest has an image. Don't worry, you can take one of your own, and upload it too!
ES4210010	Sierra de Abenuj (official name: Sierra de Abenuj); Other names: n/a	38.622222°N 1.730278°W	This Site of Community Interest has no photo. Take one and upload it! Thanks!
ES4210011	Saladares de Cordovilla y Agramón y laguna de Alboraj (official name: Saladares de Cordovilla y Agramón y laguna de Alboraj); Other names: n/a	38.545556°N 1.614167°W	Looks like this Site of Community Interest has an image. Don't worry, you can take one of your own, and upload it too!
ES4210016	Sierra del Relumbrar y estribaciones de Alcaraz (official name: Sierra del Relumbrar y estribaciones de Alcaraz); Other names: n/a	38.573611°N 2.6958330000000004°W	This Site of Community Interest has no photo. Take one and upload it! Thanks!
ES4210017	Lagunas de Ruidera (official name: Lagunas de Ruidera); Other names: n/a	38.936667°N 2.825°W	Looks like this Site of Community Interest has an image. Don't worry, you can take one of your own, and upload it too!
ES4220001	Navas de Malagón (official name: Navas de Malagón); Other names: n/a	39.184167°N 3.911667°W	This Site of Community Interest has no photo. Take one and upload it! Thanks!
ES4220002	Sierra de Picón (official name: Sierra de Picón); Other names: n/a	39.060556°N 4.115833°W	This Site of Community Interest has no photo. Take one and upload it! Thanks!
ES4220003	Ríos de la cuenca media del Guadiana y laderas vertientes (official name: Ríos de la cuenca media del Guadiana y laderas vertientes); Other names: n/a	39.029722°N 4.405°W	This Site of Community Interest has no photo. Take one and upload it! Thanks!
ES4220005	Lagunas volcánicas del Campo de Calatrava (official name: Lagunas volcánicas del Campo de Calatrava); Other names: n/a	38.805278°N 3.840833°W	Looks like this Site of Community Interest has an image. Don't worry, you can take one of your own, and upload it too!
ES4220007	Ríos Quejigal, Valdeazogues y Alcudia (official name: Ríos Quejigal, Valdeazogues y Alcudia); Other names: n/a	38.739167°N 4.54°W	This Site of Community Interest has no photo. Take one and upload it! Thanks!
ES4220013	Sierra de Los Canalizos (official name: Sierra de Los Canalizos); Other names: n/a	38.873889°N 4.618056°W	This Site of Community Interest has no photo. Take one and upload it! Thanks!
ES4220015	Sierras de Almadén - Chillón - Guadalmez (official name: Sierras de Almadén - Chillón - Guadalmez); Other names: n/a	38.743611°N 4.886667°W	This Site of Community Interest has no photo. Take one and upload it! Thanks!
ES4220017	Alcornocal de Zumajo (official name: Alcornocal de Zumajo); Other names: n/a	39.114444°N 4.837222°W	This Site of Community Interest has no photo. Take one and upload it! Thanks!
ES4220018	Túneles de Ojailén (official name: Túneles de Ojailén); Other names: n/a	38.585556°N 3.874167°W	This Site of Community Interest has no photo. Take one and upload it! Thanks!
ES4220019	Bonales de la comarca de Los Montes del Guadiana (official name: Bonales de la comarca de Los Montes del Guadiana); Other names: n/a	39.114722°N 4.575278°W	This Site of Community Interest has no photo. Take one and upload it! Thanks!
ES4220020	Lagunas de Alcoba y Horcajo de Los Montes (official name: Lagunas de Alcoba y Horcajo de Los Montes); Other names: n/a	39.283333°N 4.4583330000000005°W	This Site of Community Interest has no photo. Take one and upload it! Thanks!
ES4230001	Rentos de Orchova y vertientes del Turia (official name: Rentos de Orchova y vertientes del Turia); Other names: n/a	39.966389°N 1.194167°W	This Site of Community Interest has no photo. Take one and upload it! Thanks!
ES4230002	Sierras de Talayuelas y Aliaguilla (official name: Sierras de Talayuelas y Aliaguilla); Other names: n/a	39.80027800000001°N 1.288611°W	This Site of Community Interest has no photo. Take one and upload it! Thanks!
ES4230005	Sabinares de Campillos - Sierra y Valdemorillo de la Sierra (official name: Sabinares de Campillos - Sierra y Valdemorillo de la Sierra); Other names: n/a	40.061111°N 1.712778°W	Looks like this Site of Community Interest has an image. Don't worry, you can take one of your own, and upload it too!
ES4230006	Hoces de Alarcón (official name: Hoces de Alarcón); Other names: n/a	39.529167°N 2.076389°W	Looks like this Site of Community Interest has an image. Don't worry, you can take one of your own, and upload it too!
ES4230008	Complejo lagunar de Arcas (official name: Complejo lagunar de Arcas); Other names: n/a	39.996111°N 2.138889°W	This Site of Community Interest has no photo. Take one and upload it! Thanks!
ES4230009	Cueva de La Judía (official name: Cueva de La Judía); Other names: n/a	39.725278°N 2.145833°W	This Site of Community Interest has no photo. Take one and upload it! Thanks!
ES4230010	Cueva de Los Morciguillos (official name: Cueva de Los Morciguillos); Other names: n/a	39.928611°N 2.151111°W	This Site of Community Interest has no photo. Take one and upload it! Thanks!
ES4230012	Estepas yesosas de La Alcarria conquense (official name: Estepas yesosas de La Alcarria conquense); Other names: n/a	40.218889°N 2.664444°W	This Site of Community Interest has no photo. Take one and upload it! Thanks!
ES4230013	Hoces del Cabriel, Guadazaón y ojos de Moya (official name: Hoces del Cabriel, Guadazaón y ojos de Moya); Other names: n/a	39.96527800000001°N 1.638611°W	Looks like this Site of Community Interest has an image. Don't worry, you can take one of your own, and upload it too!
ES4230014	Serranía de Cuenca (official name: Serranía de Cuenca); Other names: n/a	40.292222°N 1.954444°W	Looks like this Site of Community Interest has an image. Don't worry, you can take one of your own, and upload it too!
ES4230015	Sierra del Santerón (official name: Sierra del Santerón); Other names: n/a	40.046111°N 1.405833°W	This Site of Community Interest has no photo. Take one and upload it! Thanks!
ES4230016	Río Júcar sobre Alarcón (official name: Río Júcar sobre Alarcón); Other names: n/a	39.943611°N 1.523333°W	Looks like this Site of Community Interest has an image. Don't worry, you can take one of your own, and upload it too!
ES4240003	Riberas del Henares (official name: Riberas del Henares); Other names: n/a	40.838056°N 3.090278°W	Looks like this Site of Community Interest has an image. Don't worry, you can take one of your own, and upload it too!
ES4240004	Rañas de Matarrubia, Villaseca y Casas de Uceda (official name: Rañas de Matarrubia, Villaseca y Casas de Uceda); Other names: n/a	40.85888900000001°N 3.339722°W	This Site of Community Interest has no photo. Take one and upload it! Thanks!
ES4240005	Lagunas de Puebla de Beleña (official name: Lagunas de Puebla de Beleña); Other names: n/a	40.890556°N 3.252778°W	Looks like this Site of Community Interest has an image. Don't worry, you can take one of your own, and upload it too!
ES4240007	Sierra de Pela (official name: Sierra de Pela); Other names: n/a	41.262222°N 3.113611°W	Looks like this Site of Community Interest has an image. Don't worry, you can take one of your own, and upload it too!
ES4240008	Cerros volcánicos de Cañamares (official name: Cerros volcánicos de Cañamares); Other names: n/a	41.206111°N 2.949444°W	This Site of Community Interest has no photo. Take one and upload it! Thanks!
ES4240009	Valle del río Cañamares (official name: Valle del río Cañamares); Other names: n/a	41.035833°N 2.942778°W	This Site of Community Interest has no photo. Take one and upload it! Thanks!
ES4240012	Rebollar de Navalpotro (official name: Rebollar de Navalpotro); Other names: n/a	40.945°N 2.587778°W	Looks like this Site of Community Interest has an image. Don't worry, you can take one of your own, and upload it too!
ES4240013	Cueva de La Canaleja (official name: Cueva de La Canaleja); Other names: n/a	40.907222°N 2.463889°W	This Site of Community Interest has no photo. Take one and upload it! Thanks!
ES4240014	Quejigares de Barriopedro y Brihuega (official name: Quejigares de Barriopedro y Brihuega); Other names: n/a	40.785556°N 2.790833°W	Looks like this Site of Community Interest has an image. Don't worry, you can take one of your own, and upload it too!
ES4240015	Valle del Tajuña en Torrecuadrada (official name: Valle del Tajuña en Torrecuadrada); Other names: n/a	40.880833°N 2.536111°W	Looks like this Site of Community Interest has an image. Don't worry, you can take one of your own, and upload it too!
ES4240016	Alto Tajo (official name: Alto Tajo); Other names: n/a	40.680833°N 2.075278°W	Looks like this Site of Community Interest has an image. Don't worry, you can take one of your own, and upload it too!
ES4240017	Parameras de Maranchón, hoz del Mesa y Aragoncillo (official name: Parameras de Maranchón, hoz del Mesa y Aragoncillo); Other names: n/a	41.039167°N 2.140556°W	Looks like this Site of Community Interest has an image. Don't worry, you can take one of your own, and upload it too!
ES4240018	Sierra de Altomira (official name: Sierra de Altomira); Other names: n/a	40.296667°N 2.828889°W	Looks like this Site of Community Interest has an image. Don't worry, you can take one of your own, and upload it too!
ES4240019	Laderas yesosas de Tendilla (official name: Laderas yesosas de Tendilla); Other names: n/a	40.540833°N 2.986389°W	This Site of Community Interest has no photo. Take one and upload it! Thanks!
ES4240020	Montes de Picaza (official name: Montes de Picaza); Other names: n/a	40.700833°N 1.831111°W	Looks like this Site of Community Interest has an image. Don't worry, you can take one of your own, and upload it too!
ES4240021	Riberas de Valfermoso de Tajuña y Brihuega (official name: Riberas de Valfermoso de Tajuña y Brihuega); Other names: n/a	40.635556°N 2.955278°W	This Site of Community Interest has no photo. Take one and upload it! Thanks!
ES4240022	Sabinares rastreros de Alustante - Tordesilos (official name: Sabinares rastreros de Alustante - Tordesilos); Other names: n/a	40.610556°N 1.606111°W	This Site of Community Interest has no photo. Take one and upload it! Thanks!
ES4240023	Lagunas y parameras del Señorío de Molina (official name: Lagunas y parameras del Señorío de Molina); Other names: n/a	41.013333°N 1.7866669999999998°W	This Site of Community Interest has no photo. Take one and upload it! Thanks!
ES4240024	Sierra de Caldereros (official name: Sierra de Caldereros); Other names: n/a	40.853611°N 1.728056°W	Looks like this Site of Community Interest has an image. Don't worry, you can take one of your own, and upload it too!
ES4250001	Sierra de San Vicente y valles del Tiétar y Alberche (official name: Sierra de San Vicente y valles del Tiétar y Alberche); Other names: n/a	40.110278°N 4.896111°W	Looks like this Site of Community Interest has an image. Don't worry, you can take one of your own, and upload it too!
ES4250003	Barrancas de Talavera (official name: Barrancas de Talavera); Other names: n/a	39.943889°N 4.078056°W	This Site of Community Interest has no photo. Take one and upload it! Thanks!
ES4250005	Montes de Toledo (official name: Montes de Toledo); Other names: n/a	39.458056°N 4.237778°W	Looks like this Site of Community Interest has an image. Don't worry, you can take one of your own, and upload it too!
ES4250006	Rincón del Torozo (official name: Rincón del Torozo); Other names: n/a	39.481667°N 5.042222°W	This Site of Community Interest has no photo. Take one and upload it! Thanks!
ES4250008	Estepas salinas de Toledo (official name: Estepas salinas de Toledo); Other names: n/a	39.845833°N 3.617222°W	Looks like this Site of Community Interest has an image. Don't worry, you can take one of your own, and upload it too!
ES4250009	Yesares del valle del Tajo (official name: Yesares del valle del Tajo); Other names: n/a	40.016389°N 3.2736110000000003°W	Looks like this Site of Community Interest has an image. Don't worry, you can take one of your own, and upload it too!
ES4250010	Humedales de La Mancha (official name: Humedales de La Mancha); Other names: n/a	39.503611°N 3.277778°W	Looks like this Site of Community Interest has an image. Don't worry, you can take one of your own, and upload it too!
ES4250011	Complejo lagunar de La Jara (official name: Complejo lagunar de La Jara); Other names: n/a	39.705278°N 4.446944°W	This Site of Community Interest has no photo. Take one and upload it! Thanks!
ES4250012	Mina de la nava de Ricomalillo (official name: Mina de la nava de Ricomalillo); Other names: n/a	39.661667°N 4.953889°W	Looks like this Site of Community Interest has an image. Don't worry, you can take one of your own, and upload it too!
ES4250013	Rios de la margen izquierda del Tajo y berrocales del Tajo (official name: Rios de la margen izquierda del Tajo y berrocales del Tajo); Other names: n/a	39.752778°N 4.846389°W	This Site of Community Interest has no photo. Take one and upload it! Thanks!
ES4250014	Sotos del río Alberche (official name: Sotos del río Alberche); Other names: n/a	40.085278°N 4.4936110000000005°W	Looks like this Site of Community Interest has an image. Don't worry, you can take one of your own, and upload it too!

== See also ==
- List of Sites of Community Importance in Spain
