= List of Sites of Community Importance in the Region of Murcia =

Murcia Community Sites

This is a list of Sites of Community Importance in the Region of Murcia.

ID	Name	Coordinates	Image
ES0000173	Sierra Espuña (official name: Sierra Espuña); Other names: n/a	37.865°N 1.5578°W	Looks like this Site of Community Interest has an image. Don't worry, you can take one of your own, and upload it too!
ES0000175	Salinas y Arenales de San Pedro del Pinatar (official name: Salinas y Arenales de San Pedro del Pinatar); Other names: n/a	37.8089°N 0.7603°W	Looks like this Site of Community Interest has an image. Don't worry, you can take one of your own, and upload it too!
ES6200001	Calblanque, Monte de las Cenizas y Peña del Águila (official name: Calblanque, Monte de las Cenizas y Peña del Águila); Other names: n/a	37.6025°N 0.7822°W	Looks like this Site of Community Interest has an image. Don't worry, you can take one of your own, and upload it too!
ES6200002	Carrascoy y El Valle (official name: Carrascoy y El Valle); Other names: n/a	37.864444°N 1.203611°W	Looks like this Site of Community Interest has an image. Don't worry, you can take one of your own, and upload it too!
ES6200003	Sierra de La Pila (official name: Sierra de La Pila); Other names: n/a	38.2569°N 1.2306°W	Looks like this Site of Community Interest has an image. Don't worry, you can take one of your own, and upload it too!
ES6200004	Sierras y Vega Alta del Segura y Ríos Alhárabe y Moratalla (official name: Sierras y Vega Alta del Segura y Ríos Alhárabe y Moratalla); Other names: n/a	38.2603°N 1.7072°W	Looks like this Site of Community Interest has an image. Don't worry, you can take one of your own, and upload it too!
ES6200005	Humedal del Ajauque y Rambla Salada (official name: Humedal del Ajauque y Rambla Salada); Other names: n/a	38.1099°N 1.0901°W	Looks like this Site of Community Interest has an image. Don't worry, you can take one of your own, and upload it too!
ES6200006	Espacios Abiertos e Islas del Mar Menor (official name: Espacios Abiertos e Islas del Mar Menor); Other names: n/a	37.664722°N 0.817778°W	Looks like this Site of Community Interest has an image. Don't worry, you can take one of your own, and upload it too!
ES6200007	Islas e Islotes del Litoral Mediterráneo (official name: Islas e Islotes del Litoral Mediterráneo); Other names: n/a	37.7267°N 0.7061°W	Looks like this Site of Community Interest has an image. Don't worry, you can take one of your own, and upload it too!
ES6200008	Sierra Salinas (official name: Sierra Salinas); Other names: n/a	38.493333°N 1.0375°W	Looks like this Site of Community Interest has an image. Don't worry, you can take one of your own, and upload it too!
ES6200009	Sierra de El Carche (official name: Sierra de El Carche); Other names: n/a	38.428889°N 1.1688889999999998°W	Looks like this Site of Community Interest has an image. Don't worry, you can take one of your own, and upload it too!
ES6200010	Cuatro Calas (official name: Cuatro Calas); Other names: n/a	37.3839°N 1.6308°W	Looks like this Site of Community Interest has an image. Don't worry, you can take one of your own, and upload it too!
ES6200011	Sierra de las Moreras (official name: Sierra de las Moreras); Other names: n/a	37.5814°N 1.3894°W	Looks like this Site of Community Interest has an image. Don't worry, you can take one of your own, and upload it too!
ES6200012	Calnegre (official name: Calnegre); Other names: n/a	37.506389°N 1.439444°W	Looks like this Site of Community Interest has an image. Don't worry, you can take one of your own, and upload it too!
ES6200013	Cabezo Gordo (official name: Cabezo Gordo); Other names: n/a	37.803056°N 0.905833°W	Looks like this Site of Community Interest has an image. Don't worry, you can take one of your own, and upload it too!
ES6200014	Saladares del Guadalentín (official name: Saladares del Guadalentín); Other names: n/a	37.746389°N 1.388611°W	Looks like this Site of Community Interest has an image. Don't worry, you can take one of your own, and upload it too!
ES6200015	La Muela y Cabo Tiñoso (official name: La Muela y Cabo Tiñoso); Other names: n/a	37.5931°N 1.15°W	Looks like this Site of Community Interest has an image. Don't worry, you can take one of your own, and upload it too!
ES6200016	Revolcadores (official name: Revolcadores); Other names: n/a	38.0469°N 2.2806°W	Looks like this Site of Community Interest has an image. Don't worry, you can take one of your own, and upload it too!
ES6200017	Sierra de Villafuerte (official name: Sierra de Villafuerte); Other names: n/a	38.1422°N 2.1511°W	This Site of Community Interest has no photo. Take one and upload it! Thanks!
ES6200018	Sierra de la Muela (official name: Sierra de la Muela); Other names: n/a	38.2406°N 1.9772°W	This Site of Community Interest has no photo. Take one and upload it! Thanks!
ES6200019	Sierra del Gavilán (official name: Sierra del Gavilán); Other names: n/a	38.1256°N 1.9136°W	This Site of Community Interest has no photo. Take one and upload it! Thanks!
ES6200020	Casa Alta-Salinas (official name: Casa Alta-Salinas); Other names: n/a	37.8879°N 2.0422°W	This Site of Community Interest has no photo. Take one and upload it! Thanks!
ES6200021	Sierra de Lavia (official name: Sierra de Lavia); Other names: n/a	37.9633°N 1.7561°W	This Site of Community Interest has no photo. Take one and upload it! Thanks!
ES6200022	Sierra del Gigante (official name: Sierra del Gigante); Other names: n/a	37.7656°N 1.9769°W	This Site of Community Interest has no photo. Take one and upload it! Thanks!
ES6200023	Sierra de la Tercia (official name: Sierra de la Tercia); Other names: n/a	37.7425°N 1.6211°W	Looks like this Site of Community Interest has an image. Don't worry, you can take one of your own, and upload it too!
ES6200024	Cabezo de Roldán (official name: Cabezo de Roldán); Other names: n/a	37.5922°N 1.0403°W	Looks like this Site of Community Interest has an image. Don't worry, you can take one of your own, and upload it too!
ES6200025	Sierra de la Fausilla (official name: Sierra de la Fausilla); Other names: n/a	37.5669°N 0.9078°W	Looks like this Site of Community Interest has an image. Don't worry, you can take one of your own, and upload it too!
ES6200026	Sierra de Ricote-La Navela (official name: Sierra de Ricote-La Navela); Other names: n/a	38.1375°N 1.3842°W	Looks like this Site of Community Interest has an image. Don't worry, you can take one of your own, and upload it too!
ES6200027	Sierra de Abanilla (official name: Sierra de Abanilla); Other names: n/a	38.2253°N 1.0089°W	This Site of Community Interest has no photo. Take one and upload it! Thanks!
ES6200028	Río Chícamo (official name: Río Chícamo); Other names: n/a	38.178056°N 1.040833°W	Looks like this Site of Community Interest has an image. Don't worry, you can take one of your own, and upload it too!
ES6200029	Franja Litoral Sumergida de la Región de Murcia (official name: Franja Litoral Sumergida de la Región de Murcia); Other names: n/a	37.5833°N 0.7531°W	Looks like this Site of Community Interest has an image. Don't worry, you can take one of your own, and upload it too!
ES6200030	Mar Menor (official name: Mar Menor); Other names: n/a	37.7347°N 0.7872°W	Looks like this Site of Community Interest has an image. Don't worry, you can take one of your own, and upload it too!
ES6200031	Cabo Cope (official name: Cabo Cope); Other names: n/a	37.430556°N 1.4875°W	Looks like this Site of Community Interest has an image. Don't worry, you can take one of your own, and upload it too!
ES6200032	Minas de la Celia (official name: Minas de la Celia); Other names: n/a	38.4619°N 1.4721°W	Looks like this Site of Community Interest has an image. Don't worry, you can take one of your own, and upload it too!
ES6200033	Cueva de las Yeseras (official name: Cueva de las Yeseras); Other names: n/a	38.0801°N 1.0306°W	This Site of Community Interest has no photo. Take one and upload it! Thanks!
ES6200034	Lomas del Buitre y Río Luchena (official name: Lomas del Buitre y Río Luchena); Other names: n/a	37.7775°N 1.8594°W	Looks like this Site of Community Interest has an image. Don't worry, you can take one of your own, and upload it too!
ES6200035	Sierra de Almenara (official name: Sierra de Almenara); Other names: n/a	37.5456°N 1.5733°W	Looks like this Site of Community Interest has an image. Don't worry, you can take one of your own, and upload it too!
ES6200036	Sierra del Buey (official name: Sierra del Buey); Other names: n/a	38.535833°N 1.213056°W	This Site of Community Interest has no photo. Take one and upload it! Thanks!
ES6200037	Sierra del Serral (official name: Sierra del Serral); Other names: n/a	38.521389°N 1.088889°W	This Site of Community Interest has no photo. Take one and upload it! Thanks!
ES6200038	Cuerda de la Serrata (official name: Cuerda de la Serrata); Other names: n/a	38.0125°N 2.0103°W	This Site of Community Interest has no photo. Take one and upload it! Thanks!
ES6200039	Cabezo de la Jara y Rambla de Nogalte (official name: Cabezo de la Jara y Rambla de Nogalte); Other names: n/a	37.52°N 1.8819°W	Looks like this Site of Community Interest has an image. Don't worry, you can take one of your own, and upload it too!
ES6200040	Cabezos del Pericón (official name: Cabezos del Pericón); Other names: n/a	37.670278°N 1.121944°W	This Site of Community Interest has no photo. Take one and upload it! Thanks!
ES6200041	Rambla de la Rogativa (official name: Rambla de la Rogativa); Other names: n/a	38.1069°N 2.2281°W	This Site of Community Interest has no photo. Take one and upload it! Thanks!
ES6200042	Yesos de Ulea (official name: Yesos de Ulea); Other names: n/a	38.153889°N 1.266667°W	This Site of Community Interest has no photo. Take one and upload it! Thanks!
ES6200043	Río Quípar (official name: Río Quípar); Other names: n/a	38.1653°N 1.6525°W	Looks like this Site of Community Interest has an image. Don't worry, you can take one of your own, and upload it too!
ES6200044	Sierra de los Victorias (official name: Sierra de los Victorias); Other names: n/a	37.7022°N 1.1247°W	This Site of Community Interest has no photo. Take one and upload it! Thanks!
ES6200045	Río Mula y Pliego (official name: Río Mula y Pliego); Other names: n/a	38.0355°N 1.3578°W	Looks like this Site of Community Interest has an image. Don't worry, you can take one of your own, and upload it too!
ES6200046	Sierra de En medio (official name: Sierra de En medio); Other names: n/a	37.4911°N 1.8083°W	Looks like this Site of Community Interest has an image. Don't worry, you can take one of your own, and upload it too!
ES6200047	Sierra de la Torrecilla (official name: Sierra de la Torrecilla); Other names: n/a	37.6661°N 1.7736°W	Looks like this Site of Community Interest has an image. Don't worry, you can take one of your own, and upload it too!

== See also ==
- List of Sites of Community Importance in Spain
