= List of Sites of Community Importance in Navarre =

This is a list of Sites of Community Importance in Navarre.

ID	Name	Coordinates	Image
ES0000122	Aritzakun-Urritzate-Gorramendi (official name: Aritzakun-Urritzate-Gorramendi); Other names: n/a	43.2288°N 1.4294°W	Looks like this Site of Community Interest has an image. Don't worry, you can take one of your own, and upload it too!
ES0000123	Larra-Aztaparreta (official name: Larra-Aztaparreta); Other names: n/a	42.9392°N 0.7914°W	Looks like this Site of Community Interest has an image. Don't worry, you can take one of your own, and upload it too!
ES0000124	Sierra de Illón y Foz de Burgui (official name: Sierra de Illón y Foz de Burgui); Other names: n/a	42.7003°N 1.084°W	Looks like this Site of Community Interest has an image. Don't worry, you can take one of your own, and upload it too!
ES0000125	Sierra de Leire y Foz de Arbaiun (official name: Sierra de Leire y Foz de Arbaiun); Other names: n/a	42.6537°N 1.1709°W	Looks like this Site of Community Interest has an image. Don't worry, you can take one of your own, and upload it too!
ES0000126	Roncesvalles-Selva de Irati (official name: Roncesvalles-Selva de Irati); Other names: n/a	42.9676°N 1.0599°W	Looks like this Site of Community Interest has an image. Don't worry, you can take one of your own, and upload it too!
ES0000127	Peña Izaga (official name: Peña Izaga); Other names: n/a	42.7069°N 1.4386°W	Looks like this Site of Community Interest has an image. Don't worry, you can take one of your own, and upload it too!
ES0000128	Sierra de San Miguel (official name: Sierra de San Miguel); Other names: n/a	42.7633°N 0.9294°W	This Site of Community Interest has no photo. Take one and upload it! Thanks!
ES0000129	Sierra de Artxuga, Zarikieta y Montes de Areta (official name: Sierra de Artxuga, Zarikieta y Montes de Areta); Other names: n/a	42.842°N 1.3317°W	This Site of Community Interest has no photo. Take one and upload it! Thanks!
ES0000130	Sierra de Arrigorrieta y Peña Ezkaurre (official name: Sierra de Arrigorrieta y Peña Ezkaurre); Other names: n/a	42.8305°N 0.8859999999999999°W	Looks like this Site of Community Interest has an image. Don't worry, you can take one of your own, and upload it too!
ES0000132	Arabarko (official name: Arabarko); Other names: n/a	42.7975°N 1.0536°W	Looks like this Site of Community Interest has an image. Don't worry, you can take one of your own, and upload it too!
ES0000133	Laguna de Pitillas (official name: Laguna de Pitillas); Other names: n/a	42.4153°N 1.5794°W	Looks like this Site of Community Interest has an image. Don't worry, you can take one of your own, and upload it too!
ES0000134	Embalse de las Cañas (official name: Embalse de las Cañas); Other names: n/a	42.4849°N 2.4023°W	This Site of Community Interest has no photo. Take one and upload it! Thanks!
ES0000135	Estanca de los Dos Reinos (official name: Estanca de los Dos Reinos); Other names: n/a	42.3299°N 1.367°W	Looks like this Site of Community Interest has an image. Don't worry, you can take one of your own, and upload it too!
ES2200009	Larrondo-Lakartxela (official name: Larrondo-Lakartxela); Other names: n/a	42.9381°N 0.8859°W	This Site of Community Interest has no photo. Take one and upload it! Thanks!
ES2200010	Artikutza (official name: Artikutza); Other names: n/a	43.20399999999999°N 1.7934°W	Looks like this Site of Community Interest has an image. Don't worry, you can take one of your own, and upload it too!
ES2200012	Río Salazar (official name: Río Salazar); Other names: n/a	42.6566°N 1.2477°W	Looks like this Site of Community Interest has an image. Don't worry, you can take one of your own, and upload it too!
ES2200013	Río Areta (official name: Río Areta); Other names: n/a	42.7265°N 1.2538°W	This Site of Community Interest has no photo. Take one and upload it! Thanks!
ES2200014	Bidasoa (official name: Río Bidasoa); Other names: n/a	43.1314°N 1.6419°W	Looks like this Site of Community Interest has an image. Don't worry, you can take one of your own, and upload it too!
ES2200015	Regata de Orabidea y turbera de Arxuri (official name: Regata de Orabidea y turbera de Arxuri); Other names: n/a	43.2469°N 1.5319999999999998°W	This Site of Community Interest has no photo. Take one and upload it! Thanks!
ES2200017	Señorío de Bértiz (official name: Señorío de Bértiz); Other names: n/a	43.1811°N 1.5905°W	Looks like this Site of Community Interest has an image. Don't worry, you can take one of your own, and upload it too!
ES2200018	Belate (official name: Belate); Other names: n/a	43.0617°N 1.6689°W	Looks like this Site of Community Interest has an image. Don't worry, you can take one of your own, and upload it too!
ES2200019	Monte Alduide (official name: Monte Alduide); Other names: n/a	43.0307°N 1.4561°W	Looks like this Site of Community Interest has an image. Don't worry, you can take one of your own, and upload it too!
ES2200020	Aralar Range (official name: Sierra de Aralar); Other names: n/a	42.9576°N 1.9119°W	Looks like this Site of Community Interest has an image. Don't worry, you can take one of your own, and upload it too!
ES2200021	Urbasa y Andia (official name: Urbasa y Andia); Other names: n/a	42.8409°N 2.079°W	Looks like this Site of Community Interest has an image. Don't worry, you can take one of your own, and upload it too!
ES2200022	Sierra de Lokiz (official name: Sierra de Lokiz); Other names: n/a	42.7255°N 2.1962°W	Looks like this Site of Community Interest has an image. Don't worry, you can take one of your own, and upload it too!
ES2200023	Río Baztan y Regata Artesiaga (official name: Río Baztan y Regata Artesiaga); Other names: n/a	43.1417°N 1.5879°W	Looks like this Site of Community Interest has an image. Don't worry, you can take one of your own, and upload it too!
ES2200024	[[Ríos Ega-Urederra]] (official name: Ríos Ega-Urederra); Other names: n/a	42.6504°N 2.1746°W	Looks like this Site of Community Interest has an image. Don't worry, you can take one of your own, and upload it too!
ES2200025	Sistema fluvial de los ríos Irati, Urrobi y Erro (official name: Sistema fluvial de los ríos Irati, Urrobi y Erro); Other names: n/a	42.7438°N 1.3701°W	Looks like this Site of Community Interest has an image. Don't worry, you can take one of your own, and upload it too!
ES2200026	Sierra de Ugarra (official name: Sierra de Ugarra); Other names: n/a	42.7357°N 1.1924°W	This Site of Community Interest has no photo. Take one and upload it! Thanks!
ES2200027	Ríos Eska y Biniés (official name: Ríos Eska y Biniés); Other names: n/a	42.9241°N 0.8651°W	This Site of Community Interest has no photo. Take one and upload it! Thanks!
ES2200029	Sierra de Codés (official name: Sierra de Codés); Other names: n/a	42.6316°N 2.3135°W	Looks like this Site of Community Interest has an image. Don't worry, you can take one of your own, and upload it too!
ES2200030	Tramo medio del río Aragón (official name: Tramo medio del río Aragón); Other names: n/a	42.542°N 1.3428°W	Looks like this Site of Community Interest has an image. Don't worry, you can take one of your own, and upload it too!
ES2200031	Yesos de la Ribera Estellesa (official name: Yesos de la Ribera Estellesa); Other names: n/a	42.4239°N 1.8784°W	This Site of Community Interest has no photo. Take one and upload it! Thanks!
ES2200032	Montes de la Valdorba (official name: Montes de la Valdorba); Other names: n/a	42.5634°N 1.5618°W	Looks like this Site of Community Interest has an image. Don't worry, you can take one of your own, and upload it too!
ES2200033	Laguna del Juncal (official name: Laguna del Juncal); Other names: n/a	42.51600000000001°N 1.7112°W	This Site of Community Interest has no photo. Take one and upload it! Thanks!
ES2200035	Tramos Bajos del Aragón y del Arga (official name: Tramos Bajos del Aragón y del Arga); Other names: n/a	42.3166°N 1.7234°W	Looks like this Site of Community Interest has an image. Don't worry, you can take one of your own, and upload it too!
ES2200037	Bardenas Reales (official name: Bardenas Reales); Other names: n/a	42.1653°N 1.4747°W	Looks like this Site of Community Interest has an image. Don't worry, you can take one of your own, and upload it too!
ES2200039	Badina Escudera (official name: Badina Escudera); Other names: n/a	42.2662°N 1.7023°W	This Site of Community Interest has no photo. Take one and upload it! Thanks!
ES2200040	Río Ebro (official name: Río Ebro); Other names: n/a	42.0891°N 1.6036°W	Looks like this Site of Community Interest has an image. Don't worry, you can take one of your own, and upload it too!
ES2200041	Balsa del Pulguer (official name: Balsa del Pulguer); Other names: n/a	42.0558°N 1.7094°W	This Site of Community Interest has no photo. Take one and upload it! Thanks!
ES2200042	Peñadil, Montecillo y Monterrey (official name: Peñadil, Montecillo y Monterrey); Other names: n/a	41.9586°N 1.6073°W	Looks like this Site of Community Interest has an image. Don't worry, you can take one of your own, and upload it too!
ES2200043	Robledales de Ultzama y Basaburua (official name: Robledales de Ultzama y Basaburua); Other names: n/a	42.9917°N 1.6906°W	Looks like this Site of Community Interest has an image. Don't worry, you can take one of your own, and upload it too!

== See also ==
- List of Sites of Community Importance in Spain
