= List of Sites of Community Importance in Cantabria =

This is a list of Sites of Community Importance in Cantabria.

ID	Name	Coordinates	Image
ES1300001	Liébana (official name: Liébana); Other names: n/a	43.0571°N 4.6532°W	Looks like this Site of Community Interest has an image. Don't worry, you can take one of your own, and upload it too!
ES1300002	Montaña oriental (official name: Montaña oriental); Other names: n/a	43.25°N 3.6123°W	Looks like this Site of Community Interest has an image. Don't worry, you can take one of your own, and upload it too!
ES1300003	Rias occidentales y Duna de Oyambre (official name: Rias occidentales y Duna de Oyambre); Other names: n/a	43.3828°N 4.4082°W	Looks like this Site of Community Interest has an image. Don't worry, you can take one of your own, and upload it too!
ES1300004	Dunas de Liencres y Estuario del Pas (official name: Dunas de Liencres y Estuario del Pas); Other names: n/a	43.4702°N 3.9348°W	Looks like this Site of Community Interest has an image. Don't worry, you can take one of your own, and upload it too!
ES1300005	Dunas del Puntal y Estuario del Miera (official name: Dunas del Puntal y Estuario del Miera); Other names: n/a	43.4345°N 3.7466°W	Looks like this Site of Community Interest has an image. Don't worry, you can take one of your own, and upload it too!
ES1300006	Costa central y Ría de Ajo (official name: Costa central y Ría de Ajo); Other names: n/a	43.4966°N 3.6319°W	Looks like this Site of Community Interest has an image. Don't worry, you can take one of your own, and upload it too!
ES1300007	Santoña, Victoria and Joyel Marshes Natural Park (official name: Marismas de Santoña, Victoria y Joyel); Other names: n/a	43.3708°N 3.4929°W	Looks like this Site of Community Interest has an image. Don't worry, you can take one of your own, and upload it too!
ES1300008	Rio Deva (official name: Rio Deva); Other names: n/a	43.1544°N 4.677°W	Looks like this Site of Community Interest has an image. Don't worry, you can take one of your own, and upload it too!
ES1300009	Río Nansa (official name: Río Nansa); Other names: n/a	43.25°N 4.409°W	Looks like this Site of Community Interest has an image. Don't worry, you can take one of your own, and upload it too!
ES1300010	Río Pas (official name: Río Pas); Other names: n/a	43.0644°N 3.8628°W	Looks like this Site of Community Interest has an image. Don't worry, you can take one of your own, and upload it too!
ES1300011	Río Asón (official name: Río Asón); Other names: n/a	43.1844°N 3.5188°W	Looks like this Site of Community Interest has an image. Don't worry, you can take one of your own, and upload it too!
ES1300012	Río Agüera (official name: Río Agüera); Other names: n/a	43.3266°N 3.2962°W	Looks like this Site of Community Interest has an image. Don't worry, you can take one of your own, and upload it too!
ES1300013	Río y Embalse del Ebro (official name: Río y Embalse del Ebro); Other names: n/a	42.7893°N 4.0815°W	Looks like this Site of Community Interest has an image. Don't worry, you can take one of your own, and upload it too!
ES1300014	Río Camesa (official name: Río Camesa); Other names: n/a	42.8612°N 4.1837°W	Looks like this Site of Community Interest has an image. Don't worry, you can take one of your own, and upload it too!
ES1300015	Río Miera (official name: Río Miera); Other names: n/a	43.3454°N 3.6882°W	Looks like this Site of Community Interest has an image. Don't worry, you can take one of your own, and upload it too!
ES1300016	Sierra del Escudo (official name: Sierra del Escudo); Other names: n/a	43.0807°N 3.9228°W	Looks like this Site of Community Interest has an image. Don't worry, you can take one of your own, and upload it too!
ES1300017	Cueva La Rogería (official name: Cueva La Rogería); Other names: n/a	43.395°N 4.1242°W	This Site of Community Interest has no photo. Take one and upload it! Thanks!
ES1300019	Cueva del Rejo (official name: Cueva del Rejo); Other names: n/a	43.3399°N 4.4786°W	This Site of Community Interest has no photo. Take one and upload it! Thanks!
ES1300020	Río Saja (official name: Río Saja); Other names: n/a	43.1604°N 4.2492°W	Looks like this Site of Community Interest has an image. Don't worry, you can take one of your own, and upload it too!
ES1300021	Valles altos del Nansa y Saja y Alto Campoo (official name: Valles altos del Nansa y Saja y Alto Campoo); Other names: n/a	42.9868°N 4.3086°W	Looks like this Site of Community Interest has an image. Don't worry, you can take one of your own, and upload it too!
ES1300022	Sierra del Escudo de Cabuérniga (official name: Sierra del Escudo de Cabuérniga); Other names: n/a	43.2812°N 4.3628°W	Looks like this Site of Community Interest has an image. Don't worry, you can take one of your own, and upload it too!

== See also ==
- List of Sites of Community Importance in Spain
