= List of Sites of Community Importance in Melilla =

This is a list of Sites of Community Importance in Melilla.

ID	Name	Coordinates	Image
ES6320001	Zona marítimo terrestre de los acantilados de Aguadú (official name: Zona marítimo terrestre de los acantilados de Aguadú); Other names: n/a	35.3208°N 2.9508°W	Looks like this Site of Community Interest has an image. Don't worry, you can take one of your own, and upload it too!
ES6320002	Barranco del Nano (official name: Barranco del Nano); Other names: n/a	35.3097°N 2.9611°W	This Site of Community Interest has no photo. Take one and upload it! Thanks!

== See also ==
- List of Sites of Community Importance in Spain
