= List of Sites of Community Importance in the Community of Madrid =

This is a list of Sites of Community Importance in the Community of Madrid.

ID	Name	Coordinates	Image
ES3110001	Cuencas de los ríos Jarama y Henares (official name: Cuencas de los ríos Jarama y Henares); Other names: n/a	40.6164°N 3.4292°W	Looks like this Site of Community Interest has an image. Don't worry, you can take one of your own, and upload it too!
ES3110002	Cuenca del río Lozoya y Sierra Norte (official name: Cuenca del río Lozoya y Sierra Norte); Other names: n/a	40.9414°N 3.7036°W	Looks like this Site of Community Interest has an image. Don't worry, you can take one of your own, and upload it too!
ES3110003	Cuenca del río Guadalix (official name: Cuenca del río Guadalix); Other names: n/a	40.7261°N 3.6397°W	Looks like this Site of Community Interest has an image. Don't worry, you can take one of your own, and upload it too!
ES3110004	Cuenca del río Manzanares (official name: Cuenca del río Manzanares); Other names: n/a	40.6361°N 3.8339°W	Looks like this Site of Community Interest has an image. Don't worry, you can take one of your own, and upload it too!
ES3110005	Cuenca del río Guadarrama (official name: Cuenca del río Guadarrama); Other names: n/a	40.5028°N 4.0056°W	Looks like this Site of Community Interest has an image. Don't worry, you can take one of your own, and upload it too!
ES3110006	Vegas, cuestas y páramos del sureste de Madrid (official name: Vegas, cuestas y páramos del sureste de Madrid); Other names: n/a	40.1789°N 3.5797°W	Looks like this Site of Community Interest has an image. Don't worry, you can take one of your own, and upload it too!
ES3110007	Cuencas de los ríos Alberche y Cofio (official name: Cuencas de los ríos Alberche y Cofio); Other names: n/a	40.3756°N 4.2683°W	Looks like this Site of Community Interest has an image. Don't worry, you can take one of your own, and upload it too!

== See also ==
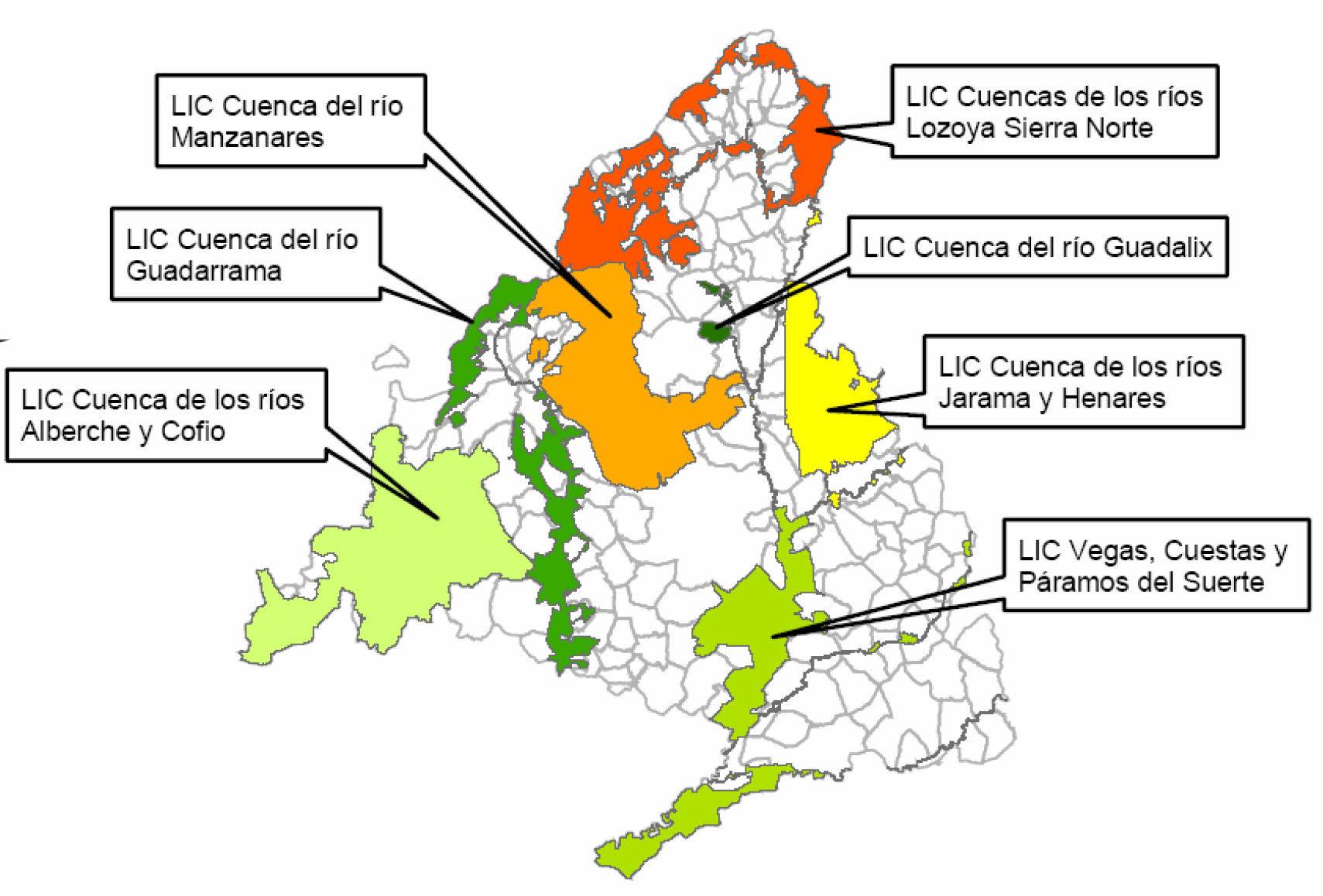
Map of Sites of Community Importance in the Community of Madrid.

- List of Sites of Community Importance in Spain
