= List of Sites of Community Importance in Catalonia =

This is a list of Sites of Community Importance in Catalonia.

ID	Name	Coordinates	Image
ES0000018	Prepirineu Central català (official name: Prepirineu Central català); Other names: n/a	42.255°N 1.6883°E	Looks like this Site of Community Interest has an image. Don't worry, you can take one of your own, and upload it too!
ES0000019	Aiguamolls de l'Alt Empordà (official name: Aiguamolls de l'Alt Empordà); Other names: n/a	42.1959°N 3.1364°E	Looks like this Site of Community Interest has an image. Don't worry, you can take one of your own, and upload it too!
ES0000020	Delta de l'Ebre (official name: Delta de l'Ebre); Other names: n/a	40.6121°N 0.7717°E	Looks like this Site of Community Interest has an image. Don't worry, you can take one of your own, and upload it too!
ES0000022	Aigüestortes (official name: Aigüestortes); Other names: n/a	42.5536°N 0.9454°E	Looks like this Site of Community Interest has an image. Don't worry, you can take one of your own, and upload it too!
ES0000146	Delta del Llobregat (official name: Delta del Llobregat); Other names: n/a	41.2769°N 0.9858°E	Looks like this Site of Community Interest has an image. Don't worry, you can take one of your own, and upload it too!
ES5110001	Massís del Montseny (official name: Massís del Montseny); Other names: n/a	41.7757°N 2.3458°E	Looks like this Site of Community Interest has an image. Don't worry, you can take one of your own, and upload it too!
ES5110004	Serra de Catllaràs (official name: Serra de Catllaràs); Other names: n/a	42.2025°N 1.9444°E	Looks like this Site of Community Interest has an image. Don't worry, you can take one of your own, and upload it too!
ES5110005	Sistema Transversal català (official name: Sistema Transversal català); Other names: n/a	42.1304°N 2.3379°E	Looks like this Site of Community Interest has an image. Don't worry, you can take one of your own, and upload it too!
ES5110007	Riu i Estanys de Tordera (official name: Riu i Estanys de Tordera); Other names: n/a	41.7048°N 2.7108°E	Looks like this Site of Community Interest has an image. Don't worry, you can take one of your own, and upload it too!
ES5110008	Gallifa-Cingles de Bertí (official name: Gallifa-Cingles de Bertí); Other names: n/a	41.7155°N 2.2167°E	Looks like this Site of Community Interest has an image. Don't worry, you can take one of your own, and upload it too!
ES5110009	Riera de Merlès (official name: Riera de Merlès); Other names: n/a	41.9722°N 1.9847°E	Looks like this Site of Community Interest has an image. Don't worry, you can take one of your own, and upload it too!
ES5110010	Sant Llorenç del Munt i l'Obac (official name: Sant Llorenç del Munt i l'Obac); Other names: n/a	41.6659°N 1.973°E	Looks like this Site of Community Interest has an image. Don't worry, you can take one of your own, and upload it too!
ES5110011	Serres del Litoral Septentrional (official name: Serres del Litoral Septentrional); Other names: n/a	41.664°N 2.6364°E	Looks like this Site of Community Interest has an image. Don't worry, you can take one of your own, and upload it too!
ES5110012	Montserrat-Roques Blanques-riu Llobregat (official name: Montserrat-Roques Blanques-riu Llobregat); Other names: n/a	41.5876°N 1.8423°E	Looks like this Site of Community Interest has an image. Don't worry, you can take one of your own, and upload it too!
ES5110013	Serres del Litoral central (official name: Serres del Litoral central); Other names: n/a	41.2944°N 1.8967°E	Looks like this Site of Community Interest has an image. Don't worry, you can take one of your own, and upload it too!
ES5110014	Serra de Castelltallat (official name: Serra de Castelltallat); Other names: n/a	41.8072°N 1.6686°E	Looks like this Site of Community Interest has an image. Don't worry, you can take one of your own, and upload it too!
ES5110015	Sistema Prelitoral Central (official name: Sistema Prelitoral Central); Other names: n/a	41.4514°N 1.4156°E	Looks like this Site of Community Interest has an image. Don't worry, you can take one of your own, and upload it too!
ES5110016	Riera de Sorreigs (official name: Riera de Sorreigs); Other names: n/a	42.0075°N 2.1769°E	Looks like this Site of Community Interest has an image. Don't worry, you can take one of your own, and upload it too!
ES5110017	Costes del Maresme (official name: Costes del Maresme); Other names: n/a	41.5281°N 2.4878°E	Looks like this Site of Community Interest has an image. Don't worry, you can take one of your own, and upload it too!
ES5110018	Valls de l'Anoia (official name: Valls de l'Anoia); Other names: n/a	41.4951°N 1.7061°E	Looks like this Site of Community Interest has an image. Don't worry, you can take one of your own, and upload it too!
ES5110019	Carbassí (official name: Carbassí); Other names: n/a	41.6181°N 1.4336°E	Looks like this Site of Community Interest has an image. Don't worry, you can take one of your own, and upload it too!
ES5110020	Costes del Garraf (official name: Costes del Garraf); Other names: n/a	41.198°N 1.857°E	Looks like this Site of Community Interest has an image. Don't worry, you can take one of your own, and upload it too!
ES5110021	Riera de la Goda (official name: Riera de la Goda); Other names: n/a	41.5627°N 1.4588°E	This Site of Community Interest has no photo. Take one and upload it! Thanks!
ES5110022	Capçaleres del Foix (official name: Capçaleres del Foix); Other names: n/a	41.4406°N 1.5864°E	Looks like this Site of Community Interest has an image. Don't worry, you can take one of your own, and upload it too!
ES5110023	Riera de Clariana (official name: Riera de Clariana); Other names: n/a	41.6056°N 1.49°E	Looks like this Site of Community Interest has an image. Don't worry, you can take one of your own, and upload it too!
ES5110024	Serra de Collserola (official name: Serra de Collserola); Other names: n/a	41.4141°N 2.0476°E	Looks like this Site of Community Interest has an image. Don't worry, you can take one of your own, and upload it too!
ES5110025	Riu Congost (official name: Riu Congost); Other names: n/a	41.5455°N 2.2403°E	Looks like this Site of Community Interest has an image. Don't worry, you can take one of your own, and upload it too!
ES5120001	Alta Garrotxa - Massís de les Salines (official name: Alta Garrotxa - Massís de les Salines); Other names: n/a	42.3065°N 2.5956°E	Looks like this Site of Community Interest has an image. Don't worry, you can take one of your own, and upload it too!
ES5120002	Capçaleres del Ter i del Freser (official name: Capçaleres del Ter i del Freser); Other names: n/a	42.3846°N 2.2167°E	Looks like this Site of Community Interest has an image. Don't worry, you can take one of your own, and upload it too!
ES5120003	Serra Cavallera (official name: Serra Cavallera); Other names: n/a	42.2903°N 2.2334°E	Looks like this Site of Community Interest has an image. Don't worry, you can take one of your own, and upload it too!
ES5120004	Zona Volcànica de la Garrotxa (official name: Zona Volcànica de la Garrotxa); Other names: n/a	42.0911°N 2.4839°E	Looks like this Site of Community Interest has an image. Don't worry, you can take one of your own, and upload it too!
ES5120005	Riu Llobregat d'Empordà (official name: Riu Llobregat d'Empordà); Other names: n/a	42.3317°N 2.9473°E	Looks like this Site of Community Interest has an image. Don't worry, you can take one of your own, and upload it too!
ES5120007	Cap de Creus (official name: Cap de Creus); Other names: n/a	42.3036°N 3.2296°E	Looks like this Site of Community Interest has an image. Don't worry, you can take one of your own, and upload it too!
ES5120008	Estany de Banyoles (official name: Estany de Banyoles); Other names: n/a	42.1264°N 2.7422°E	Looks like this Site of Community Interest has an image. Don't worry, you can take one of your own, and upload it too!
ES5120009	Basses de l'Albera (official name: Basses de l'Albera); Other names: n/a	42.4001°N 2.9248°E	Looks like this Site of Community Interest has an image. Don't worry, you can take one of your own, and upload it too!
ES5120010	Les Gavarres (official name: Les Gavarres); Other names: n/a	41.9242°N 2.97°E	Looks like this Site of Community Interest has an image. Don't worry, you can take one of your own, and upload it too!
ES5120011	Riberes del Baix Ter (official name: Riberes del Baix Ter); Other names: n/a	42.0161°N 2.8533°E	Looks like this Site of Community Interest has an image. Don't worry, you can take one of your own, and upload it too!
ES5120012	Les Guilleries (official name: Les Guilleries); Other names: n/a	41.9364°N 2.4983°E	Looks like this Site of Community Interest has an image. Don't worry, you can take one of your own, and upload it too!
ES5120013	Massís de les Cadiretes (official name: Massís de les Cadiretes); Other names: n/a	41.768°N 2.9303°E	Looks like this Site of Community Interest has an image. Don't worry, you can take one of your own, and upload it too!
ES5120014	L'Albera (official name: L'Albera); Other names: n/a	42.4159°N 3.0329°E	Looks like this Site of Community Interest has an image. Don't worry, you can take one of your own, and upload it too!
ES5120015	Litoral del Baix Empordà (official name: Litoral del Baix Empordà); Other names: n/a	41.8645°N 3.1689°E	Looks like this Site of Community Interest has an image. Don't worry, you can take one of your own, and upload it too!
ES5120016	El Montgrí- Les Medes - El Baix Ter (official name: El Montgrí- Les Medes - El Baix Ter); Other names: n/a	42.082°N 3.1696°E	Looks like this Site of Community Interest has an image. Don't worry, you can take one of your own, and upload it too!
ES5120017	Estany de Sils-Ribera de Santa Coloma (official name: Estany de Sils-Ribera de Santa Coloma); Other names: n/a	41.7957°N 2.7338°E	Looks like this Site of Community Interest has an image. Don't worry, you can take one of your own, and upload it too!
ES5120018	Muntanyes de Rocacorba-Puig de la Banya del Boc (official name: Muntanyes de Rocacorba-Puig de la Banya del Boc); Other names: n/a	42.0656°N 2.6931°E	Looks like this Site of Community Interest has an image. Don't worry, you can take one of your own, and upload it too!
ES5120019	Riberes de l'Alt Ter (official name: Riberes de l'Alt Ter); Other names: n/a	42.2324°N 2.294°E	Looks like this Site of Community Interest has an image. Don't worry, you can take one of your own, and upload it too!
ES5120020	Riu Llémena (official name: Riu Llémena); Other names: n/a	42.0705°N 2.6057°E	Looks like this Site of Community Interest has an image. Don't worry, you can take one of your own, and upload it too!
ES5120021	Riu Fluvià (official name: Riu Fluvià); Other names: n/a	42.1545°N 2.9369°E	Looks like this Site of Community Interest has an image. Don't worry, you can take one of your own, and upload it too!
ES5120022	Riu Duran (official name: Riu Duran); Other names: n/a	42.4235°N 1.7955°E	This Site of Community Interest has no photo. Take one and upload it! Thanks!
ES5120023	Rieres de Xuclà i Riudelleques (official name: Rieres de Xuclà i Riudelleques); Other names: n/a	42.0238°N 2.8021°E	Looks like this Site of Community Interest has an image. Don't worry, you can take one of your own, and upload it too!
ES5120024	Montgrony (official name: Montgrony); Other names: n/a	42.2822°N 2.0831°E	Looks like this Site of Community Interest has an image. Don't worry, you can take one of your own, and upload it too!
ES5120025	Garriga d'Empordà (official name: Garriga d'Empordà); Other names: n/a	42.2686°N 2.9111°E	Looks like this Site of Community Interest has an image. Don't worry, you can take one of your own, and upload it too!
ES5120026	Tossa Plana de Lles-Puigpedrós (official name: Tossa Plana de Lles-Puigpedrós); Other names: n/a	42.4497°N 1.6695°E	Looks like this Site of Community Interest has an image. Don't worry, you can take one of your own, and upload it too!
ES5120027	Rasos de Tubau (official name: Rasos de Tubau); Other names: n/a	42.2239°N 2.0472°E	This Site of Community Interest has no photo. Take one and upload it! Thanks!
ES5120028	Vall del Rigart (official name: Vall del Rigart); Other names: n/a	42.3133°N 2.1203°E	This Site of Community Interest has no photo. Take one and upload it! Thanks!
ES5120029	Riu Brugent (official name: Riu Brugent); Other names: n/a	42.0376°N 2.5723°E	This Site of Community Interest has no photo. Take one and upload it! Thanks!
ES5130001	Els Bessons (official name: Els Bessons); Other names: n/a	41.4678°N 0.8478°E	This Site of Community Interest has no photo. Take one and upload it! Thanks!
ES5130002	Riu Verneda (official name: Riu Verneda); Other names: n/a	42.3908°N 1.6711°E	This Site of Community Interest has no photo. Take one and upload it! Thanks!
ES5130003	Alt Pallars (official name: Alt Pallars); Other names: n/a	42.7159°N 1.034°E	Looks like this Site of Community Interest has an image. Don't worry, you can take one of your own, and upload it too!
ES5130004	Baish Aran (official name: Baish Aran); Other names: n/a	42.799°N 0.7879999999999999°E	Looks like this Site of Community Interest has an image. Don't worry, you can take one of your own, and upload it too!
ES5130005	Era Artiga de Lin - Eth Portilhon (official name: Era Artiga de Lin - Eth Portilhon); Other names: n/a	42.6713°N 0.7168°E	Looks like this Site of Community Interest has an image. Don't worry, you can take one of your own, and upload it too!
ES5130006	Estanho de Vielha (official name: Estanho de Vielha); Other names: n/a	42.7095°N 0.8144°E	Looks like this Site of Community Interest has an image. Don't worry, you can take one of your own, and upload it too!
ES5130007	Riberes de l'Alt Segre (official name: Riberes de l'Alt Segre); Other names: n/a	42.3915°N 1.8499°E	Looks like this Site of Community Interest has an image. Don't worry, you can take one of your own, and upload it too!
ES5130008	Serra d'Aubenç i Roc de Cogul (official name: Serra d'Aubenç i Roc de Cogul); Other names: n/a	42.0847°N 1.2758°E	Looks like this Site of Community Interest has an image. Don't worry, you can take one of your own, and upload it too!
ES5130009	Serra de Turp i Mora Condal-Valldan (official name: Serra de Turp i Mora Condal-Valldan); Other names: n/a	42.1178°N 1.3536°E	Looks like this Site of Community Interest has an image. Don't worry, you can take one of your own, and upload it too!
ES5130010	Serra de Boumort-Collegats (official name: Serra de Boumort-Collegats); Other names: n/a	42.2367°N 1.1003°E	Looks like this Site of Community Interest has an image. Don't worry, you can take one of your own, and upload it too!
ES5130011	Riu de la Llosa (official name: Riu de la Llosa); Other names: n/a	42.45°N 1.6992°E	Looks like this Site of Community Interest has an image. Don't worry, you can take one of your own, and upload it too!
ES5130012	Vall Alta de Serradell-Serra de Sant Gervàs (official name: Vall Alta de Serradell-Serra de Sant Gervàs); Other names: n/a	42.2305°N 0.8124°E	Looks like this Site of Community Interest has an image. Don't worry, you can take one of your own, and upload it too!
ES5130013	Aiguabarreig Segre-Cinca (official name: Aiguabarreig Segre-Cinca); Other names: n/a	41.4644°N 0.4153°E	Looks like this Site of Community Interest has an image. Don't worry, you can take one of your own, and upload it too!
ES5130014	Aiguabarreig Segre-Noguera Pallaresa (official name: Aiguabarreig Segre-Noguera Pallaresa); Other names: n/a	41.9294°N 0.8439°E	Looks like this Site of Community Interest has an image. Don't worry, you can take one of your own, and upload it too!
ES5130015	Serres del Montsec, Sant Mamet i Mitjana (official name: Serres del Montsec, Sant Mamet i Mitjana); Other names: n/a	42.0303°N 0.8722°E	Looks like this Site of Community Interest has an image. Don't worry, you can take one of your own, and upload it too!
ES5130016	Valls del Sió-Llobregós (official name: Valls del Sió-Llobregós); Other names: n/a	41.8172°N 1.1978°E	Looks like this Site of Community Interest has an image. Don't worry, you can take one of your own, and upload it too!
ES5130017	Basses de Sucs i Alcarràs (official name: Basses de Sucs i Alcarràs); Other names: n/a	41.6447°N 0.4841°E	This Site of Community Interest has no photo. Take one and upload it! Thanks!
ES5130018	Estany d'Ivars- Vilasana (official name: Estany d'Ivars- Vilasana); Other names: n/a	41.6836°N 0.9497°E	Looks like this Site of Community Interest has an image. Don't worry, you can take one of your own, and upload it too!
ES5130019	Estany de Montcortès (official name: Estany de Montcortès); Other names: n/a	42.3319°N 0.9947°E	Looks like this Site of Community Interest has an image. Don't worry, you can take one of your own, and upload it too!
ES5130020	Aiguabarreig Segre-Noguera Ribagorçana (official name: Aiguabarreig Segre-Noguera Ribagorçana); Other names: n/a	41.6818°N 0.7153°E	Looks like this Site of Community Interest has an image. Don't worry, you can take one of your own, and upload it too!
ES5130021	Secans de la Noguera (official name: Secans de la Noguera); Other names: n/a	41.8236°N 0.7047°E	This Site of Community Interest has no photo. Take one and upload it! Thanks!
ES5130022	La Torrassa (official name: La Torrassa); Other names: n/a	42.6064°N 1.1331°E	Looks like this Site of Community Interest has an image. Don't worry, you can take one of your own, and upload it too!
ES5130023	Beneïdor (official name: Beneïdor); Other names: n/a	42.3719°N 1.5653°E	Looks like this Site of Community Interest has an image. Don't worry, you can take one of your own, and upload it too!
ES5130024	La Faiada de Malpàs i Cambatiri (official name: La Faiada de Malpàs i Cambatiri); Other names: n/a	42.3817°N 0.7739°E	Looks like this Site of Community Interest has an image. Don't worry, you can take one of your own, and upload it too!
ES5130025	Bellmunt-Almenara (official name: Bellmunt-Almenara); Other names: n/a	41.7811°N 0.9528°E	Looks like this Site of Community Interest has an image. Don't worry, you can take one of your own, and upload it too!
ES5130026	Serra de Prada-Castellàs (official name: Serra de Prada-Castellàs); Other names: n/a	42.2711°N 1.3044°E	This Site of Community Interest has no photo. Take one and upload it! Thanks!
ES5130027	Obagues de la riera de Madrona (official name: Obagues de la riera de Madrona); Other names: n/a	41.9706°N 1.385°E	Looks like this Site of Community Interest has an image. Don't worry, you can take one of your own, and upload it too!
ES5130028	Ribera Salada (official name: Ribera Salada); Other names: n/a	42.0419°N 1.4325°E	Looks like this Site of Community Interest has an image. Don't worry, you can take one of your own, and upload it too!
ES5130029	Serres de Queralt i Els Tossals-Aigua d'Ora (official name: Serres de Queralt i Els Tossals-Aigua d'Ora); Other names: n/a	42.0592°N 1.67°E	Looks like this Site of Community Interest has an image. Don't worry, you can take one of your own, and upload it too!
ES5130030	Estanys de Basturs (official name: Estanys de Basturs); Other names: n/a	42.1453°N 1.0189°E	Looks like this Site of Community Interest has an image. Don't worry, you can take one of your own, and upload it too!
ES5130032	Vessants de la Noguera Ribagorçana (official name: Vessants de la Noguera Ribagorçana); Other names: n/a	41.8826°N 0.6394°E	Looks like this Site of Community Interest has an image. Don't worry, you can take one of your own, and upload it too!
ES5130034	Riu Garona (official name: Riu Garona); Other names: n/a	42.7369°N 0.7414°E	Looks like this Site of Community Interest has an image. Don't worry, you can take one of your own, and upload it too!
ES5130035	Plans de la Unilla (official name: Plans de la Unilla); Other names: n/a	41.7665°N 0.5514°E	This Site of Community Interest has no photo. Take one and upload it! Thanks!
ES5130036	Plans de Sió (official name: Plans de Sió); Other names: n/a	41.7217°N 1.1269°E	Looks like this Site of Community Interest has an image. Don't worry, you can take one of your own, and upload it too!
ES5130037	Secans de Belianes-Preixana (official name: Secans de Belianes-Preixana); Other names: n/a	41.5928°N 1.0128°E	Looks like this Site of Community Interest has an image. Don't worry, you can take one of your own, and upload it too!
ES5130038	Secans del Segrià i Utxesa (official name: Secans del Segrià i Utxesa); Other names: n/a	41.4439°N 0.4653°E	Looks like this Site of Community Interest has an image. Don't worry, you can take one of your own, and upload it too!
ES5130039	Vall de Vinaixa (official name: Vall de Vinaixa); Other names: n/a	41.4356°N 0.9944°E	This Site of Community Interest has no photo. Take one and upload it! Thanks!
ES5130040	Secans de Mas de Melons-Alfés (official name: Secans de Mas de Melons-Alfés); Other names: n/a	41.5228°N 0.6903°E	Looks like this Site of Community Interest has an image. Don't worry, you can take one of your own, and upload it too!
ES5140001	Litoral meridional tarragoní (official name: Litoral meridional tarragoní); Other names: n/a	40.8868°N 0.8256°E	Looks like this Site of Community Interest has an image. Don't worry, you can take one of your own, and upload it too!
ES5140002	Serra de Godall (official name: Serra de Godall); Other names: n/a	40.6327°N 0.4611°E	Looks like this Site of Community Interest has an image. Don't worry, you can take one of your own, and upload it too!
ES5140003	Ribera de l'Algars (official name: Ribera de l'Algars); Other names: n/a	41.1172°N 0.2291°E	This Site of Community Interest has no photo. Take one and upload it! Thanks!
ES5140004	Sèquia Major (official name: Sèquia Major); Other names: n/a	41.0887°N 1.1882°E	Looks like this Site of Community Interest has an image. Don't worry, you can take one of your own, and upload it too!
ES5140005	Serra de Montsià (official name: Serra de Montsià); Other names: n/a	40.6192°N 0.5289°E	Looks like this Site of Community Interest has an image. Don't worry, you can take one of your own, and upload it too!
ES5140006	Serres de Cardó- El Boix (official name: Serres de Cardó- El Boix); Other names: n/a	40.9081°N 0.5819°E	Looks like this Site of Community Interest has an image. Don't worry, you can take one of your own, and upload it too!
ES5140007	Costes del Tarragonès (official name: Costes del Tarragonès); Other names: n/a	41.1267°N 1.3851°E	Looks like this Site of Community Interest has an image. Don't worry, you can take one of your own, and upload it too!
ES5140008	Muntanyes de Prades (official name: Muntanyes de Prades); Other names: n/a	41.305°N 1.0333°E	Looks like this Site of Community Interest has an image. Don't worry, you can take one of your own, and upload it too!
ES5140009	Tivissa-Vandellòs-Llaberia (official name: Tivissa-Vandellòs-Llaberia); Other names: n/a	41.0367°N 0.8058°E	Looks like this Site of Community Interest has an image. Don't worry, you can take one of your own, and upload it too!
ES5140010	Riberes i Illes de l'Ebre (official name: Riberes i Illes de l'Ebre); Other names: n/a	41.2364°N 0.5237°E	Looks like this Site of Community Interest has an image. Don't worry, you can take one of your own, and upload it too!
ES5140011	Sistema Prelitoral meridional (official name: Sistema Prelitoral meridional); Other names: n/a	40.8053°N 0.3856°E	Looks like this Site of Community Interest has an image. Don't worry, you can take one of your own, and upload it too!
ES5140012	Tossals d'Almatret i Riba Roja (official name: Tossals d'Almatret i Riba Roja); Other names: n/a	41.2247°N 0.3977°E	This Site of Community Interest has no photo. Take one and upload it! Thanks!
ES5140014	Massís de Bonastre (official name: Massís de Bonastre); Other names: n/a	41.2242°N 1.4736°E	Looks like this Site of Community Interest has an image. Don't worry, you can take one of your own, and upload it too!
ES5140015	Riu Siurana i planes del Priorat (official name: Riu Siurana i planes del Priorat); Other names: n/a	41.1825°N 0.8064°E	Looks like this Site of Community Interest has an image. Don't worry, you can take one of your own, and upload it too!
ES5140016	Tossal de Montagut (official name: Tossal de Montagut); Other names: n/a	40.9211°N 0.7136°E	This Site of Community Interest has no photo. Take one and upload it! Thanks!
ES5140017	Serra de Montsant-Pas de l'Ase (official name: Serra de Montsant-Pas de l'Ase); Other names: n/a	41.2417°N 0.7547°E	Looks like this Site of Community Interest has an image. Don't worry, you can take one of your own, and upload it too!
ES5140018	El Montmell-Marmellar (official name: El Montmell-Marmellar); Other names: n/a	41.3375°N 1.5056°E	Looks like this Site of Community Interest has an image. Don't worry, you can take one of your own, and upload it too!
ES5140019	Riu Gaià (official name: Riu Gaià); Other names: n/a	41.2261°N 1.3478°E	Looks like this Site of Community Interest has an image. Don't worry, you can take one of your own, and upload it too!
ES5140020	Grapissar de la Masia Blanca (official name: Grapissar de la Masia Blanca); Other names: n/a	41.1692°N 1.5114°E	This Site of Community Interest has no photo. Take one and upload it! Thanks!
ES5140021	Obagues del riu Corb (official name: Obagues del riu Corb); Other names: n/a	41.5381°N 1.2458°E	Looks like this Site of Community Interest has an image. Don't worry, you can take one of your own, and upload it too!
ES5140022	Barranc de Santes Creus (official name: Barranc de Santes Creus); Other names: n/a	40.8828°N 0.7551°E	This Site of Community Interest has no photo. Take one and upload it! Thanks!
ES5140023	Secans del Montsià (official name: Secans del Montsià); Other names: n/a	40.6331°N 0.35°E	This Site of Community Interest has no photo. Take one and upload it! Thanks!

== See also ==
- List of Sites of Community Importance in Spain
