= List of Sites of Community Importance in Spain designated by the Ministry of Agriculture, Food and Environment =

This is a list of Sites of Community Importance designated by the Ministry of Agriculture, Food and Environment.

ID	Name	Coordinates	Image
ES0000214	Espacio marino de Tabarca (official name: Espacio marino de Tabarca); Other names: n/a	38.1898°N 0.4851°W	This Site of Community Interest has no photo. Take one and upload it! Thanks!
ES0000447	Espacio marino de Orpesa y Benicàssim (official name: Espacio marino de Orpesa y Benicàssim); Other names: n/a	40.0437°N 0.0913°E	This Site of Community Interest has no photo. Take one and upload it! Thanks!
ES5212005	L'Almadrava (official name: L'Almadrava); Other names: n/a	38.8771°N 0.0629°E	Looks like this Site of Community Interest has an image. Don't worry, you can take one of your own, and upload it too!
ES5222007	Alguers de Borriana-Nules-Moncofa (official name: Alguers de Borriana-Nules-Moncofa); Other names: n/a	39.7877°N 0.1185°W	This Site of Community Interest has no photo. Take one and upload it! Thanks!
ES5310108	Área marina del cap Martinet (official name: Área marina del cap Martinet); Other names: n/a	38.9327°N 1.5107°E	This Site of Community Interest has no photo. Take one and upload it! Thanks!
ES6110009	Fondos Marinos de Punta Entinas-Sabinar (official name: Fondos Marinos de Punta Entinas-Sabinar); Other names: n/a	36.6782°N 2.7007°W	Looks like this Site of Community Interest has an image. Don't worry, you can take one of your own, and upload it too!
ES6110010	Fondos Marinos Levante Almeriense (official name: Fondos Marinos Levante Almeriense); Other names: n/a	37.2173°N 1.7751°W	Looks like this Site of Community Interest has an image. Don't worry, you can take one of your own, and upload it too!
ES6110019	Arrecifes de Roquetas de Mar (official name: Arrecifes de Roquetas de Mar); Other names: n/a	36.7838°N 2.5876°W	This Site of Community Interest has no photo. Take one and upload it! Thanks!
ES6120032	Estrecho Oriental (official name: Estrecho Oriental); Other names: n/a	36.1139°N 5.2965°W	This Site of Community Interest has no photo. Take one and upload it! Thanks!
ES6170036	Fondos Marinos de La Bahía de Estepona (official name: Fondos Marinos de La Bahía de Estepona); Other names: n/a	36.415533°N 5.13545°W	This Site of Community Interest has no photo. Take one and upload it! Thanks!
ES6170037	El Saladillo - Punta de Baños (official name: El Saladillo - Punta de Baños); Other names: n/a	36.432333°N 5.01575°W	Looks like this Site of Community Interest has an image. Don't worry, you can take one of your own, and upload it too!
ES6200048	Valles submarinos del Escarpe de Mazarrón (official name: Valles submarinos del Escarpe de Mazarrón); Other names: n/a	37.4848°N 0.9586°W	Looks like this Site of Community Interest has an image. Don't worry, you can take one of your own, and upload it too!
ES6300001	Chafarinas Islands (official name: Islas Chafarinas); Other names: n/a	35.1833°N 2.4264°W	Looks like this Site of Community Interest has an image. Don't worry, you can take one of your own, and upload it too!
ES7010016	Área marina de La Isleta (official name: Área marina de La Isleta); Other names: n/a	28.1833°N 15.3814°W	Looks like this Site of Community Interest has an image. Don't worry, you can take one of your own, and upload it too!
ES7010017	Franja marina de Mogán (official name: Franja marina de Mogán); Other names: n/a	27.7766°N 15.7585°W	Looks like this Site of Community Interest has an image. Don't worry, you can take one of your own, and upload it too!
ES7010020	Sebadales de La Graciosa (official name: Sebadales de La Graciosa); Other names: n/a	29.2228°N 13.5018°W	Looks like this Site of Community Interest has an image. Don't worry, you can take one of your own, and upload it too!
ES7010021	Sebadales de Guasimeta (official name: Sebadales de Guasimeta); Other names: n/a	28.9323°N 13.5905°W	This Site of Community Interest has no photo. Take one and upload it! Thanks!
ES7010022	Sebadales de Corralejo (official name: Sebadales de Corralejo); Other names: n/a	28.7087°N 13.8256°W	Looks like this Site of Community Interest has an image. Don't worry, you can take one of your own, and upload it too!
ES7010035	Playa de Sotavento de Jandía (official name: Playa de Sotavento de Jandía); Other names: n/a	28.1673°N 14.1949°W	Looks like this Site of Community Interest has an image. Don't worry, you can take one of your own, and upload it too!
ES7010037	Bahía del Confital (official name: Bahía del Confital); Other names: n/a	28.1378°N 15.4421°W	Looks like this Site of Community Interest has an image. Don't worry, you can take one of your own, and upload it too!
ES7010048	Bahía de Gando (official name: Bahía de Gando); Other names: n/a	27.9228°N 15.3742°W	Looks like this Site of Community Interest has an image. Don't worry, you can take one of your own, and upload it too!
ES7010053	Playa del Cabrón (official name: Playa del Cabrón); Other names: n/a	27.8545°N 15.3804°W	Looks like this Site of Community Interest has an image. Don't worry, you can take one of your own, and upload it too!
ES7010056	Sebadales de Playa del Inglés (official name: Sebadales de Playa del Inglés); Other names: n/a	27.7463°N 15.5526°W	Looks like this Site of Community Interest has an image. Don't worry, you can take one of your own, and upload it too!
ES7010066	Costa de Sardina del Norte (official name: Costa de Sardina del Norte); Other names: n/a	28.154°N 15.7073°W	This Site of Community Interest has no photo. Take one and upload it! Thanks!
ES7011002	Cagafrecho (official name: Cagafrecho); Other names: n/a	28.9134°N 13.6631°W	This Site of Community Interest has no photo. Take one and upload it! Thanks!
ES7011005	Sebadales de Güigüí (official name: Sebadales de Güigüí); Other names: n/a	27.9528°N 15.872°W	Looks like this Site of Community Interest has an image. Don't worry, you can take one of your own, and upload it too!
ES7020017	Franja marina Teno-Rasca (official name: Franja marina Teno-Rasca); Other names: n/a	28.1932°N 16.8918°W	Looks like this Site of Community Interest has an image. Don't worry, you can take one of your own, and upload it too!
ES7020057	Mar de Las Calmas (official name: Mar de Las Calmas); Other names: n/a	27.6587°N 18.0544°W	Looks like this Site of Community Interest has an image. Don't worry, you can take one of your own, and upload it too!
ES7020116	Sebadales del sur de Tenerife (official name: Sebadales del sur de Tenerife); Other names: n/a	28.0209°N 16.5868°W	This Site of Community Interest has no photo. Take one and upload it! Thanks!
ES7020117	Cueva marina de San Juan (official name: Cueva marina de San Juan); Other names: n/a	28.1729°N 16.8069°W	This Site of Community Interest has no photo. Take one and upload it! Thanks!
ES7020120	Sebadal de San Andrés (official name: Sebadal de San Andrés); Other names: n/a	28.496°N 16.1901°W	This Site of Community Interest has no photo. Take one and upload it! Thanks!
ES7020122	Franja marina de Fuencaliente (official name: Franja marina de Fuencaliente); Other names: n/a	28.5356°N 17.8979°W	Looks like this Site of Community Interest has an image. Don't worry, you can take one of your own, and upload it too!
ES7020123	Franja marina Santiago-Valle Gran Rey (official name: Franja marina Santiago-Valle Gran Rey); Other names: n/a	28.027°N 17.2938°W	This Site of Community Interest has no photo. Take one and upload it! Thanks!
ES7020124	Costa de Garafía (official name: Costa de Garafía); Other names: n/a	28.8501°N 17.8883°W	Looks like this Site of Community Interest has an image. Don't worry, you can take one of your own, and upload it too!
ES7020125	Costa de los Órganos (official name: Costa de los Órganos); Other names: n/a	28.2107°N 17.293°W	This Site of Community Interest has no photo. Take one and upload it! Thanks!
ES7020126	Costa de San Juan de la Rambla (official name: Costa de San Juan de la Rambla); Other names: n/a	28.4063°N 16.6354°W	Looks like this Site of Community Interest has an image. Don't worry, you can take one of your own, and upload it too!
ES7020128	Sebadales de Antequera (official name: Sebadales de Antequera); Other names: n/a	28.5261°N 16.1341°W	Looks like this Site of Community Interest has an image. Don't worry, you can take one of your own, and upload it too!
ES90ATL01	Le Danois Bank (official name: El Cachucho); Other names: n/a	44.0423°N 4.85°W	This Site of Community Interest has no photo. Take one and upload it! Thanks!
ESZZ12001	Banco de Galicia (official name: Banco de Galicia); Other names: n/a	42.7338°N 11.7952°W	This Site of Community Interest has no photo. Take one and upload it! Thanks!
ESZZ12002	Volcanes de fango del Golfo de Cádiz (official name: Volcanes de fango del Golfo de Cádiz); Other names: n/a	36.2085°N 7.143°W	This Site of Community Interest has no photo. Take one and upload it! Thanks!
ESZZ12003	Sistema de cañones submarinos de Avilés (official name: Sistema de cañones submarinos de Avilés); Other names: n/a	43.8712°N 6.1001°W	This Site of Community Interest has no photo. Take one and upload it! Thanks!
ESZZ15001	Banco de la Concepción (official name: Banco de la Concepción); Other names: n/a	30.0074°N 12.6785°W	This Site of Community Interest has no photo. Take one and upload it! Thanks!
ESZZ15002	Espacio marino del oriente y sur de Lanzarote-Fuerteventura (official name: Espacio marino del oriente y sur de Lanzarote-Fuerteventura); Other names: n/a	28.0046°N 14.0695°W	This Site of Community Interest has no photo. Take one and upload it! Thanks!
ESZZ16001	Sistema de cañones submarinos occidentales del Golfo de León (official name: Sistema de cañones submarinos occidentales del Golfo de León); Other names: n/a	42.3934°N 3.4371°E	This Site of Community Interest has no photo. Take one and upload it! Thanks!
ESZZ16002	Canal de Menorca (official name: Canal de Menorca); Other names: n/a	39.878°N 3.6224°E	This Site of Community Interest has no photo. Take one and upload it! Thanks!
ESZZ16003	Sur de Almería - Seco de los Olivos (official name: Sur de Almería - Seco de los Olivos); Other names: n/a	36.647°N 2.5009°W	This Site of Community Interest has no photo. Take one and upload it! Thanks!
ESZZ16004	Espacio marino de Illes Columbretes (official name: Espacio marino de Illes Columbretes); Other names: n/a	39.8796°N 0.6187°E	This Site of Community Interest has no photo. Take one and upload it! Thanks!
ESZZ16005	Espacio marino de Alborán (official name: Espacio marino de Alborán); Other names: n/a	35.9377°N 2.9159°W	This Site of Community Interest has no photo. Take one and upload it! Thanks!
ESZZ16006	Espacio marino de Ifac (official name: Espacio marino de Ifac); Other names: n/a	38.6496°N 0.0793°E	This Site of Community Interest has no photo. Take one and upload it! Thanks!
ESZZ16007	Espacio marino de la Marina Alta (official name: Espacio marino de la Marina Alta); Other names: n/a	38.728°N 0.2071°E	This Site of Community Interest has no photo. Take one and upload it! Thanks!
ESZZ16008	Espacio marino del Cabo de les Hortes (official name: Espacio marino del Cabo de les Hortes); Other names: n/a	38.3999°N 0.376°W	This Site of Community Interest has no photo. Take one and upload it! Thanks!
ESZZ16009	Espacio marino de Cabo Roig (official name: Espacio marino de Cabo Roig); Other names: n/a	37.9603°N 0.6804°W	This Site of Community Interest has no photo. Take one and upload it! Thanks!
ESZZ16010	Espacio marino del entorno de Illes Columbretes (official name: Espacio marino del entorno de Illes Columbretes); Other names: n/a	39.8766°N 0.6785°E	This Site of Community Interest has no photo. Take one and upload it! Thanks!

== See also ==
- List of Sites of Community Importance in Spain
