= List of Sites of Community Importance in Ceuta =

This is a list of Sites of Community Importance in Ceuta.

ID	Name	Coordinates	Image
ES6310001	Calamocarro-Benzú (official name: Calamocarro-Benzú); Other names: n/a	35.905278°N 5.363889°W	Looks like this Site of Community Interest has an image. Don't worry, you can take one of your own, and upload it too!
ES6310002	Zona marítimo-terrestre del Monte Hacho (official name: Zona marítimo-terrestre del Monte Hacho); Other names: n/a	35.899722°N 5.286667°W	Looks like this Site of Community Interest has an image. Don't worry, you can take one of your own, and upload it too!

== See also ==
- List of Sites of Community Importance in Spain
