= List of Sites of Community Importance in Spain =

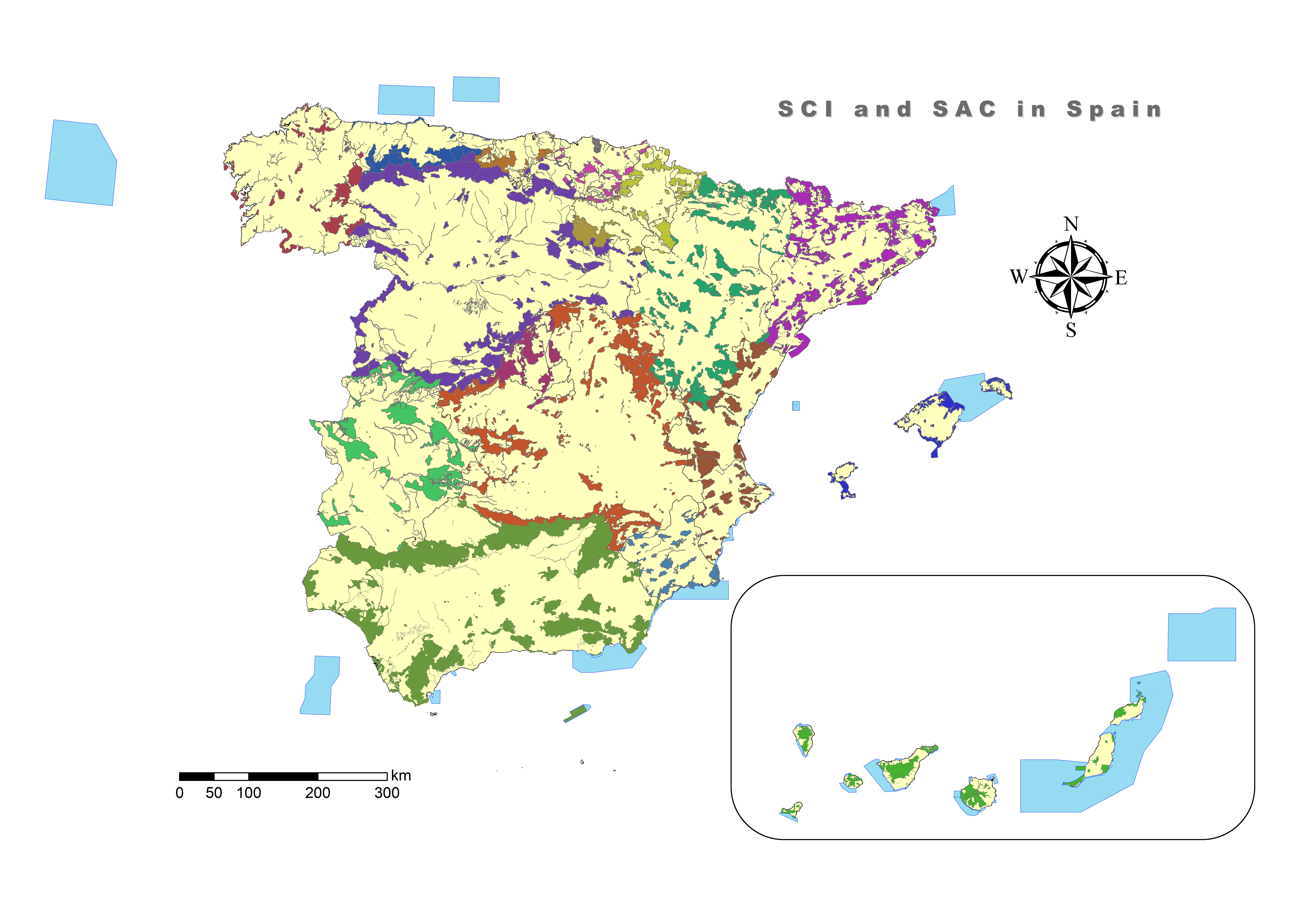
SCI of Spain

This is a list of Sites of Community Importance in Spain.

- List of Sites of Community Importance in Andalusia
- List of Sites of Community Importance in Aragon
- List of Sites of Community Importance in Principality of Asturias
- List of Sites of Community Importance in the Balearic Islands
- List of Sites of Community Importance in Basque Country
- List of Sites of Community Importance in the Canary Islands
- List of Sites of Community Importance in Cantabria
- List of Sites of Community Importance in Castile-La Mancha
- List of Sites of Community Importance in Castile and León
- List of Sites of Community Importance in Catalonia
- List of Sites of Community Importance in Ceuta
- List of Sites of Community Importance in Extremadura
- List of Sites of Community Importance in Galicia
- List of Sites of Community Importance in La Rioja
- List of Sites of Community Importance in the Community of Madrid
- List of Sites of Community Importance in Melilla
- List of Sites of Community Importance in the Region of Murcia
- List of Sites of Community Importance in Navarre
- List of Sites of Community Importance in Valencian Community
- List of Sites of Community Importance in Spain designated by the Ministry of Agriculture, Food and Environment

== See also ==
- List of Sites of Community Importance by country
