= List of Sites of Community Importance in Extremadura =

This is a list of Sites of Community Importance in Extremadura.

ID	Name	Coordinates	Image
ES0000068	Embalse de Orellana y Sierra de Pela (official name: Embalse de Orellana y Sierra de Pela); Other names: n/a	39.0464°N 5.3561°W	Looks like this Site of Community Interest has an image. Don't worry, you can take one of your own, and upload it too!
ES0000069	Embalse de Cornalvo y Sierra Bermeja (official name: Embalse de Cornalvo y Sierra Bermeja); Other names: n/a	39.0333°N 6.2244°W	Looks like this Site of Community Interest has an image. Don't worry, you can take one of your own, and upload it too!
ES0000070	Sierra de San Pedro (official name: Sierra de San Pedro); Other names: n/a	39.3308°N 6.7781°W	Looks like this Site of Community Interest has an image. Don't worry, you can take one of your own, and upload it too!
ES0000072	Sierra Grande de Hornachos (official name: Sierra Grande de Hornachos); Other names: n/a	38.5789°N 6.0319°W	Looks like this Site of Community Interest has an image. Don't worry, you can take one of your own, and upload it too!
ES0000369	Llanos de Alcantara y Brozas (official name: Llanos de Alcantara y Brozas); Other names: n/a	39.589444°N 6.8597220000000005°W	This Site of Community Interest has no photo. Take one and upload it! Thanks!
ES4310003	Complejo Lagunar de la Albuera (official name: Complejo Lagunar de la Albuera); Other names: n/a	38.6969°N 6.7633°W	This Site of Community Interest has no photo. Take one and upload it! Thanks!
ES4310004	Dehesas de Jerez (official name: Dehesas de Jerez); Other names: n/a	38.369167°N 7.033889°W	This Site of Community Interest has no photo. Take one and upload it! Thanks!
ES4310008	Estena (official name: Estena); Other names: n/a	39.365833°N 4.777222°W	Looks like this Site of Community Interest has an image. Don't worry, you can take one of your own, and upload it too!
ES4310009	Puerto Peña - los Golondrinos (official name: Puerto Peña - los Golondrinos); Other names: n/a	39.2333°N 5.0622°W	Looks like this Site of Community Interest has an image. Don't worry, you can take one of your own, and upload it too!
ES4310010	La Serena (official name: La Serena); Other names: n/a	38.873889°N 5.388056°W	Looks like this Site of Community Interest has an image. Don't worry, you can take one of your own, and upload it too!
ES4310015	Río Alcarrache (official name: Río Alcarrache); Other names: n/a	38.469167°N 6.9133330000000015°W	This Site of Community Interest has no photo. Take one and upload it! Thanks!
ES4310017	Río Aljucén Bajo (official name: Río Aljucén Bajo); Other names: n/a	39.002222°N 6.376944°W	Looks like this Site of Community Interest has an image. Don't worry, you can take one of your own, and upload it too!
ES4310019	Río Ardila Alto (official name: Río Ardila Alto); Other names: n/a	38.206667°N 6.460833°W	Looks like this Site of Community Interest has an image. Don't worry, you can take one of your own, and upload it too!
ES4310020	Río Ardila Bajo (official name: Río Ardila Bajo); Other names: n/a	38.239722°N 6.867222°W	Looks like this Site of Community Interest has an image. Don't worry, you can take one of your own, and upload it too!
ES4310022	Río Gevora Alto (official name: Río Gevora Alto); Other names: n/a	39.249722°N 7.131667°W	Looks like this Site of Community Interest has an image. Don't worry, you can take one of your own, and upload it too!
ES4310023	Río Guadalemar (official name: Río Guadalemar); Other names: n/a	39.086667°N 4.921389°W	This Site of Community Interest has no photo. Take one and upload it! Thanks!
ES4310024	Río Guadamez (official name: Río Guadamez); Other names: n/a	38.682778000000006°N 5.870278°W	Looks like this Site of Community Interest has an image. Don't worry, you can take one of your own, and upload it too!
ES4310026	Río Guadiana Alto - Zujar (official name: Río Guadiana Alto - Zujar); Other names: n/a	38.958333°N 5.943611°W	Looks like this Site of Community Interest has an image. Don't worry, you can take one of your own, and upload it too!
ES4310027	Río Guadiana Internacional (official name: Río Guadiana Internacional); Other names: n/a	38.8136°N 7.0972°W	Looks like this Site of Community Interest has an image. Don't worry, you can take one of your own, and upload it too!
ES4310028	Río Matachel (official name: Río Matachel); Other names: n/a	38.424444°N 5.897222°W	Looks like this Site of Community Interest has an image. Don't worry, you can take one of your own, and upload it too!
ES4310032	Rivera de los Limonetes - Nogales (official name: Rivera de los Limonetes - Nogales); Other names: n/a	38.7056°N 6.7803°W	This Site of Community Interest has no photo. Take one and upload it! Thanks!
ES4310036	Sierra de Escorial (official name: Sierra de Escorial); Other names: n/a	39.106944°N 5.105278°W	This Site of Community Interest has no photo. Take one and upload it! Thanks!
ES4310040	Sierra de Moraleja (official name: Sierra de Moraleja); Other names: n/a	38.7778°N 5.0078°W	This Site of Community Interest has no photo. Take one and upload it! Thanks!
ES4310042	Sierra de Siruela (official name: Sierra de Siruela); Other names: n/a	38.9278°N 5.0208°W	Looks like this Site of Community Interest has an image. Don't worry, you can take one of your own, and upload it too!
ES4310043	Sierra de Villares - Balbueno (official name: Sierra de Villares - Balbueno); Other names: n/a	39.073889°N 5.005833°W	This Site of Community Interest has no photo. Take one and upload it! Thanks!
ES4310045	Valdecigüeñas (official name: Valdecigüeñas); Other names: n/a	38.0525°N 5.9480559999999985°W	This Site of Community Interest has no photo. Take one and upload it! Thanks!
ES4310048	Corredor del Lacara (official name: Corredor del Lacara); Other names: n/a	39.0675°N 6.3991669999999985°W	This Site of Community Interest has no photo. Take one and upload it! Thanks!
ES4310049	Cueva del Valle de Santa Ana (official name: Cueva del Valle de Santa Ana); Other names: n/a	38.365833°N 6.7925°W	This Site of Community Interest has no photo. Take one and upload it! Thanks!
ES4310050	Cuevas de Alconera (official name: Cuevas de Alconera); Other names: n/a	38.406944°N 6.481667°W	This Site of Community Interest has no photo. Take one and upload it! Thanks!
ES4310055	Refugio de Sierra Pascuala (official name: Refugio de Sierra Pascuala); Other names: n/a	38.4575°N 6.5433330000000005°W	This Site of Community Interest has no photo. Take one and upload it! Thanks!
ES4310059	Río Gevora Bajo (official name: Río Gevora Bajo); Other names: n/a	38.966944°N 6.9391669999999985°W	Looks like this Site of Community Interest has an image. Don't worry, you can take one of your own, and upload it too!
ES4310060	Corredores de Siruela (official name: Corredores de Siruela); Other names: n/a	38.8875°N 4.944444°W	This Site of Community Interest has no photo. Take one and upload it! Thanks!
ES4310061	Laguna temporal de Murtales (official name: Laguna temporal de Murtales); Other names: n/a	39.068889°N 6.603611°W	This Site of Community Interest has no photo. Take one and upload it! Thanks!
ES4310062	Laguna temporal de Tres Arroyos (official name: Laguna temporal de Tres Arroyos); Other names: n/a	38.845556°N 6.907778°W	This Site of Community Interest has no photo. Take one and upload it! Thanks!
ES4310063	Río Bembezar (official name: Río Bembezar); Other names: n/a	38.220556°N 5.624167°W	Looks like this Site of Community Interest has an image. Don't worry, you can take one of your own, and upload it too!
ES4310064	Río Ortiga (official name: Río Ortiga); Other names: n/a	38.701111°N 5.705278°W	This Site of Community Interest has no photo. Take one and upload it! Thanks!
ES4310065	Río Palomillas (official name: Río Palomillas); Other names: n/a	38.676389°N 6.102778°W	This Site of Community Interest has no photo. Take one and upload it! Thanks!
ES4310066	Sierra de Maria Andres (official name: Sierra de Maria Andres); Other names: n/a	38.531389°N 6.663611°W	This Site of Community Interest has no photo. Take one and upload it! Thanks!
ES4310067	Sierras de Alor y Monte Longo (official name: Sierras de Alor y Monte Longo); Other names: n/a	38.556944°N 7.051389°W	Looks like this Site of Community Interest has an image. Don't worry, you can take one of your own, and upload it too!
ES4310068	Sierras de Bienvenida y la Capitana (official name: Sierras de Bienvenida y la Capitana); Other names: n/a	38.27027800000001°N 6.151944°W	This Site of Community Interest has no photo. Take one and upload it! Thanks!
ES4310069	Cueva del Agua (official name: Cueva del Agua); Other names: n/a	38.021667°N 6.49°W	This Site of Community Interest has no photo. Take one and upload it! Thanks!
ES4310070	Mina las Marias (official name: Mina las Marias); Other names: n/a	38.494167°N 7.196944°W	This Site of Community Interest has no photo. Take one and upload it! Thanks!
ES4310071	Mina los Castillejos (official name: Mina los Castillejos); Other names: n/a	38.460833°N 6.5°W	This Site of Community Interest has no photo. Take one and upload it! Thanks!
ES4310072	Mina Mariquita (official name: Mina Mariquita); Other names: n/a	38.3575°N 6.1858330000000015°W	This Site of Community Interest has no photo. Take one and upload it! Thanks!
ES4310073	Mina los Novilleros (official name: Mina los Novilleros); Other names: n/a	38.58°N 7.238889°W	This Site of Community Interest has no photo. Take one and upload it! Thanks!
ES4310074	Arroyos Cabriles y Friegamuñoz (official name: Arroyos Cabriles y Friegamuñoz); Other names: n/a	38.4744°N 7.2192°W	This Site of Community Interest has no photo. Take one and upload it! Thanks!
ES4310075	Rivera de Taliga (official name: Rivera de Taliga); Other names: n/a	38.6069°N 7.2339°W	This Site of Community Interest has no photo. Take one and upload it! Thanks!
ES4320001	Canchos de Ramiro (official name: Canchos de Ramiro); Other names: n/a	39.924167°N 6.753056°W	Looks like this Site of Community Interest has an image. Don't worry, you can take one of your own, and upload it too!
ES4320002	Cedillo y Río Tajo Internacional (official name: Cedillo y Río Tajo Internacional); Other names: n/a	39.605556°N 7.236111°W	This Site of Community Interest has no photo. Take one and upload it! Thanks!
ES4320005	Dehesas del Ruecas y Cubilar (official name: Dehesas del Ruecas y Cubilar); Other names: n/a	39.2°N 5.5069°W	This Site of Community Interest has no photo. Take one and upload it! Thanks!
ES4320011	Las Hurdes (official name: Las Hurdes); Other names: n/a	40.3969°N 6.2597°W	Looks like this Site of Community Interest has an image. Don't worry, you can take one of your own, and upload it too!
ES4320013	Granadilla (official name: Granadilla); Other names: n/a	40.275556°N 6.061667°W	Looks like this Site of Community Interest has an image. Don't worry, you can take one of your own, and upload it too!
ES4320016	Río Aljucen Alto (official name: Río Aljucen Alto); Other names: n/a	39.147778°N 6.189722°W	This Site of Community Interest has no photo. Take one and upload it! Thanks!
ES4320018	Río Almonte (official name: Río Almonte); Other names: n/a	39.5433°N 5.9764°W	Looks like this Site of Community Interest has an image. Don't worry, you can take one of your own, and upload it too!
ES4320021	Río Erjas (official name: Río Erjas); Other names: n/a	40.0267°N 6.9183°W	Looks like this Site of Community Interest has an image. Don't worry, you can take one of your own, and upload it too!
ES4320029	Río Ruecas Alto (official name: Río Ruecas Alto); Other names: n/a	39.375278°N 5.391389°W	This Site of Community Interest has no photo. Take one and upload it! Thanks!
ES4320030	Río Salor (official name: Río Salor); Other names: n/a	39.443333°N 6.674722°W	Looks like this Site of Community Interest has an image. Don't worry, you can take one of your own, and upload it too!
ES4320031	Tiétar (river) (official name: Río Tiétar); Other names: n/a	40.0339°N 5.6783°W	Looks like this Site of Community Interest has an image. Don't worry, you can take one of your own, and upload it too!
ES4320033	Rivera de los Molinos y la Torre (official name: Rivera de los Molinos y la Torre); Other names: n/a	39.481389°N 6.968889°W	This Site of Community Interest has no photo. Take one and upload it! Thanks!
ES4320035	Sierra de Cabezas de Aguila (official name: Sierra de Cabezas de Aguila); Other names: n/a	39.396667°N 5.553333°W	This Site of Community Interest has no photo. Take one and upload it! Thanks!
ES4320037	Sierra de Gata (official name: Sierra de Gata); Other names: n/a	40.273333°N 6.645556°W	Looks like this Site of Community Interest has an image. Don't worry, you can take one of your own, and upload it too!
ES4320038	Sierra de Gredos y Valle del Jerte (official name: Sierra de Gredos y Valle del Jerte); Other names: n/a	40.1928°N 5.7211°W	Looks like this Site of Community Interest has an image. Don't worry, you can take one of your own, and upload it too!
ES4320039	Sierra de las Villuercas y Valle del Guadarranque (official name: Sierra de las Villuercas y Valle del Guadarranque); Other names: n/a	39.5567°N 5.3206°W	Looks like this Site of Community Interest has an image. Don't worry, you can take one of your own, and upload it too!
ES4320046	Regato Guadalto (official name: Regato Guadalto); Other names: n/a	39.441667°N 6.861667°W	This Site of Community Interest has no photo. Take one and upload it! Thanks!
ES4320047	Sierras de Risco Viejo (official name: Sierras de Risco Viejo); Other names: n/a	40.2403°N 6.3222°W	This Site of Community Interest has no photo. Take one and upload it! Thanks!
ES4320051	Mina de la Aurora (official name: Mina de la Aurora); Other names: n/a	40.147778°N 6.6980559999999985°W	This Site of Community Interest has no photo. Take one and upload it! Thanks!
ES4320052	Mina de la Rivera de Acebo (official name: Mina de la Rivera de Acebo); Other names: n/a	40.1697°N 6.6819°W	This Site of Community Interest has no photo. Take one and upload it! Thanks!
ES4320057	Refugio del Alto de San Blas (official name: Refugio del Alto de San Blas); Other names: n/a	39.338056°N 5.519167°W	This Site of Community Interest has no photo. Take one and upload it! Thanks!
ES4320060	Arroyos Barbaon y Calzones (official name: Arroyos Barbaon y Calzones); Other names: n/a	39.941944°N 6.069167°W	This Site of Community Interest has no photo. Take one and upload it! Thanks!
ES4320061	Arroyos Patana y Regueros (official name: Arroyos Patana y Regueros); Other names: n/a	40.0525°N 6.5619°W	This Site of Community Interest has no photo. Take one and upload it! Thanks!
ES4320062	Cañada del Venero (official name: Cañada del Venero); Other names: n/a	39.931111°N 5.428889°W	This Site of Community Interest has no photo. Take one and upload it! Thanks!
ES4320063	Embalse Arce de Abajo (official name: Embalse Arce de Abajo); Other names: n/a	39.591667°N 6.686667°W	This Site of Community Interest has no photo. Take one and upload it! Thanks!
ES4320064	Embalse de Lancho (official name: Embalse de Lancho); Other names: n/a	39.4775°N 6.5105559999999985°W	This Site of Community Interest has no photo. Take one and upload it! Thanks!
ES4320065	Embalse de Petit I (official name: Embalse de Petit I); Other names: n/a	39.54°N 6.5608330000000015°W	This Site of Community Interest has no photo. Take one and upload it! Thanks!
ES4320066	Laguna temporal de Corrales (official name: Laguna temporal de Corrales); Other names: n/a	39.878056°N 6.629167°W	This Site of Community Interest has no photo. Take one and upload it! Thanks!
ES4320067	Laguna temporal de Valdehornos (official name: Laguna temporal de Valdehornos); Other names: n/a	40.181944°N 6.602222°W	This Site of Community Interest has no photo. Take one and upload it! Thanks!
ES4320068	Márgenes de Valdecañas (official name: Márgenes de Valdecañas); Other names: n/a	39.8261°N 5.3647°W	This Site of Community Interest has no photo. Take one and upload it! Thanks!
ES4320069	Río Esperaban (official name: Río Esperaban); Other names: n/a	40.3311°N 6.2944°W	This Site of Community Interest has no photo. Take one and upload it! Thanks!
ES4320070	Río Guadalupejo (official name: Río Guadalupejo); Other names: n/a	39.427778°N 5.265833°W	This Site of Community Interest has no photo. Take one and upload it! Thanks!
ES4320071	Ríos Alagon y Jerte (official name: Ríos Alagon y Jerte); Other names: n/a	40.0794°N 6.1833°W	Looks like this Site of Community Interest has an image. Don't worry, you can take one of your own, and upload it too!
ES4320072	Ríos Arrago y Tralgas (official name: Ríos Arrago y Tralgas); Other names: n/a	40.2292°N 6.485°W	This Site of Community Interest has no photo. Take one and upload it! Thanks!
ES4320073	Rivera de Aurela (official name: Rivera de Aurela); Other names: n/a	39.601111°N 7.285833°W	This Site of Community Interest has no photo. Take one and upload it! Thanks!
ES4320074	Rivera de Membrio (official name: Rivera de Membrio); Other names: n/a	39.548611°N 7.052222°W	This Site of Community Interest has no photo. Take one and upload it! Thanks!
ES4320075	Riveras de Carbajo y Calatrucha (official name: Riveras de Carbajo y Calatrucha); Other names: n/a	39.629722°N 7.1491669999999985°W	This Site of Community Interest has no photo. Take one and upload it! Thanks!
ES4320076	Riveras de Gata y Acebo (official name: Riveras de Gata y Acebo); Other names: n/a	40.16°N 6.6553°W	This Site of Community Interest has no photo. Take one and upload it! Thanks!
ES4320077	Monfragüe (official name: Monfragüe); Other names: n/a	39.79638900000001°N 5.963056°W	Looks like this Site of Community Interest has an image. Don't worry, you can take one of your own, and upload it too!
ES4320078	Monasterio de Yuste (official name: Monasterio de Yuste); Other names: n/a	40.114722°N 5.736111°W	Looks like this Site of Community Interest has an image. Don't worry, you can take one of your own, and upload it too!
ES4320079	Mina la Paloma (official name: Mina la Paloma); Other names: n/a	39.840556°N 6.85°W	This Site of Community Interest has no photo. Take one and upload it! Thanks!
ES4320080	Tunel de Cañamero (official name: Tunel de Cañamero); Other names: n/a	39.36°N 5.405278°W	This Site of Community Interest has no photo. Take one and upload it! Thanks!

== See also ==
- List of Sites of Community Importance in Spain
