= List of Sites of Community Importance in the Balearic Islands =

This is a list of Sites of Community Importance in Balearic Islands.

ID	Name	Coordinates	Image
ES0000037	Es Trenc - Salobrar de Campos (official name: Es Trenc - Salobrar de Campos); Other names: n/a	39.3558°N 2.9881°E	Looks like this Site of Community Interest has an image. Don't worry, you can take one of your own, and upload it too!
ES0000074	Cap de cala Figuera (official name: Cap de cala Figuera); Other names: n/a	39.4633°N 2.5013°E	Looks like this Site of Community Interest has an image. Don't worry, you can take one of your own, and upload it too!
ES0000078	Es Vedrà - Es Vedranell (official name: Es Vedrà - Es Vedranell); Other names: n/a	38.8701°N 1.2059°E	Looks like this Site of Community Interest has an image. Don't worry, you can take one of your own, and upload it too!
ES0000079	La Victòria (official name: La Victòria); Other names: n/a	39.8672°N 3.1794°E	Looks like this Site of Community Interest has an image. Don't worry, you can take one of your own, and upload it too!
ES0000080	Cap Vermell (official name: Cap Vermell); Other names: n/a	39.6626°N 3.4539°E	Looks like this Site of Community Interest has an image. Don't worry, you can take one of your own, and upload it too!
ES0000082	Tagomago (official name: Tagomago); Other names: n/a	39.0385°N 1.6435°E	Looks like this Site of Community Interest has an image. Don't worry, you can take one of your own, and upload it too!
ES0000083	Cabrera Archipelago Maritime-Terrestrial National Park (official name: Arxipèlag de Cabrera); Other names: n/a	39.1588°N 2.9422°E	Looks like this Site of Community Interest has an image. Don't worry, you can take one of your own, and upload it too!
ES0000084	Ses Salines d'Eivissa i Formentera (official name: Ses Salines d'Eivissa i Formentera); Other names: n/a	38.7975°N 1.4141°E	Looks like this Site of Community Interest has an image. Don't worry, you can take one of your own, and upload it too!
ES0000145	Mondragó (official name: Mondragó); Other names: n/a	39.3382°N 3.1757°E	Looks like this Site of Community Interest has an image. Don't worry, you can take one of your own, and upload it too!
ES0000221	Dragonera (official name: Sa Dragonera); Other names: n/a	39.5842°N 2.3256°E	Looks like this Site of Community Interest has an image. Don't worry, you can take one of your own, and upload it too!
ES0000222	La Trapa (official name: La Trapa); Other names: n/a	39.6085°N 2.3774°E	Looks like this Site of Community Interest has an image. Don't worry, you can take one of your own, and upload it too!
ES0000225	Sa Costera (official name: Sa Costera); Other names: n/a	39.8166°N 2.7367°E	Looks like this Site of Community Interest has an image. Don't worry, you can take one of your own, and upload it too!
ES0000226	L'Albufereta (official name: L'Albufereta); Other names: n/a	39.8658°N 3.0847°E	Looks like this Site of Community Interest has an image. Don't worry, you can take one of your own, and upload it too!
ES0000227	Muntanyes d'Artà (official name: Muntanyes d'Artà); Other names: n/a	39.7619°N 3.3778°E	Looks like this Site of Community Interest has an image. Don't worry, you can take one of your own, and upload it too!
ES0000228	Cap de ses Salines (official name: Cap de ses Salines); Other names: n/a	39.292°N 3.0587°E	Looks like this Site of Community Interest has an image. Don't worry, you can take one of your own, and upload it too!
ES0000229	Costa Nord de Ciutadella (official name: Costa Nord de Ciutadella); Other names: n/a	40.0494°N 3.8386°E	Looks like this Site of Community Interest has an image. Don't worry, you can take one of your own, and upload it too!
ES0000231	Dels Alocs a Fornells (official name: Dels Alocs a Fornells); Other names: n/a	40.0501°N 4.0579°E	Looks like this Site of Community Interest has an image. Don't worry, you can take one of your own, and upload it too!
ES0000232	La Mola i s'Albufera de Fornells (official name: La Mola i s'Albufera de Fornells); Other names: n/a	40.0399°N 4.1436°E	This Site of Community Interest has no photo. Take one and upload it! Thanks!
ES0000233	D'Addaia a s'Albufera (official name: D'Addaia a s'Albufera); Other names: n/a	39.985°N 4.239°E	Looks like this Site of Community Interest has an image. Don't worry, you can take one of your own, and upload it too!
ES0000234	S'Albufera des Grau (official name: S'Albufera des Grau); Other names: n/a	39.9486°N 4.2605°E	Looks like this Site of Community Interest has an image. Don't worry, you can take one of your own, and upload it too!
ES0000235	De s'Albufera a la Mola (official name: De s'Albufera a la Mola); Other names: n/a	39.9161°N 4.2745°E	Looks like this Site of Community Interest has an image. Don't worry, you can take one of your own, and upload it too!
ES0000236	Illa de l'Aire (official name: Illa de l'Aire); Other names: n/a	39.8027°N 4.2902°E	Looks like this Site of Community Interest has an image. Don't worry, you can take one of your own, and upload it too!
ES0000237	Des Canutells a Llucalari (official name: Des Canutells a Llucalari); Other names: n/a	39.8987°N 4.1379°E	Looks like this Site of Community Interest has an image. Don't worry, you can take one of your own, and upload it too!
ES0000238	Son Bou i barranc de sa Vall (official name: Son Bou i barranc de sa Vall); Other names: n/a	39.9026°N 4.0721°E	Looks like this Site of Community Interest has an image. Don't worry, you can take one of your own, and upload it too!
ES0000239	De Binigaus a cala Mitjana (official name: De Binigaus a cala Mitjana); Other names: n/a	39.9455°N 3.9724°E	Looks like this Site of Community Interest has an image. Don't worry, you can take one of your own, and upload it too!
ES0000240	Costa Sud de Ciutadella (official name: Costa Sud de Ciutadella); Other names: n/a	39.9334°N 3.9017°E	Looks like this Site of Community Interest has an image. Don't worry, you can take one of your own, and upload it too!
ES0000241	Costa dels Amunts (official name: Costa dels Amunts); Other names: n/a	39.062°N 1.3521°E	Looks like this Site of Community Interest has an image. Don't worry, you can take one of your own, and upload it too!
ES0000242	Illots de Santa Eulària, Rodona i es Canà (official name: Illots de Santa Eulària, Rodona i es Canà); Other names: n/a	38.9844°N 1.5802°E	Looks like this Site of Community Interest has an image. Don't worry, you can take one of your own, and upload it too!
ES5310005	Badies de Pollença i Alcúdia (official name: Badies de Pollença i Alcúdia); Other names: n/a	39.8504°N 3.2146°E	Looks like this Site of Community Interest has an image. Don't worry, you can take one of your own, and upload it too!
ES5310008	Es Galatzó - s'Esclop (official name: Es Galatzó - s'Esclop); Other names: n/a	39.6359°N 2.4896°E	Looks like this Site of Community Interest has an image. Don't worry, you can take one of your own, and upload it too!
ES5310009	Es Teix (official name: Es Teix); Other names: n/a	39.7283°N 2.6526°E	Looks like this Site of Community Interest has an image. Don't worry, you can take one of your own, and upload it too!
ES5310010	Comuna de Bunyola (official name: Comuna de Bunyola); Other names: n/a	39.708°N 2.7285°E	Looks like this Site of Community Interest has an image. Don't worry, you can take one of your own, and upload it too!
ES5310015	Puig de Sant Martí (official name: Puig de Sant Martí); Other names: n/a	39.8337°N 3.0967°E	Looks like this Site of Community Interest has an image. Don't worry, you can take one of your own, and upload it too!
ES5310023	Illots de Ponent d'Eivissa (official name: Illots de Ponent d'Eivissa); Other names: n/a	38.9732°N 1.1931°E	Looks like this Site of Community Interest has an image. Don't worry, you can take one of your own, and upload it too!
ES5310024	La Mola (official name: La Mola); Other names: n/a	38.6568°N 1.5564°E	Looks like this Site of Community Interest has an image. Don't worry, you can take one of your own, and upload it too!
ES5310025	Cap de Barbaria (official name: Cap de Barbaria); Other names: n/a	38.6534°N 1.3925°E	Looks like this Site of Community Interest has an image. Don't worry, you can take one of your own, and upload it too!
ES5310026	Fita des Ram (official name: Fita des Ram); Other names: n/a	39.6479°N 2.5546°E	Looks like this Site of Community Interest has an image. Don't worry, you can take one of your own, and upload it too!
ES5310027	Cimals de la Serra (official name: Cimals de la Serra); Other names: n/a	39.7756°N 2.834°E	Looks like this Site of Community Interest has an image. Don't worry, you can take one of your own, and upload it too!
ES5310028	Es Binis (official name: Es Binis); Other names: n/a	39.8323°N 2.7874°E	This Site of Community Interest has no photo. Take one and upload it! Thanks!
ES5310029	Na Borges (official name: Na Borges); Other names: n/a	39.6377°N 3.2008°E	Looks like this Site of Community Interest has an image. Don't worry, you can take one of your own, and upload it too!
ES5310030	Costa de Llevant (official name: Costa de Llevant); Other names: n/a	39.3773°N 3.2482°E	Looks like this Site of Community Interest has an image. Don't worry, you can take one of your own, and upload it too!
ES5310031	Porroig (official name: Porroig); Other names: n/a	38.8775°N 1.3033°E	Looks like this Site of Community Interest has an image. Don't worry, you can take one of your own, and upload it too!
ES5310032	Cap Llentrisca - Sa Talaia (official name: Cap Llentrisca - Sa Talaia); Other names: n/a	38.8938°N 1.2501°E	Looks like this Site of Community Interest has an image. Don't worry, you can take one of your own, and upload it too!
ES5310033	Xarraca (official name: Xarraca); Other names: n/a	39.0951°N 1.4734°E	Looks like this Site of Community Interest has an image. Don't worry, you can take one of your own, and upload it too!
ES5310034	Serra Grossa (official name: Serra Grossa); Other names: n/a	38.9231°N 1.3735°E	Looks like this Site of Community Interest has an image. Don't worry, you can take one of your own, and upload it too!
ES5310035	Àrea marina del Nord de Menorca (official name: Àrea marina del Nord de Menorca); Other names: n/a	40.0766°N 4.0411°E	Looks like this Site of Community Interest has an image. Don't worry, you can take one of your own, and upload it too!
ES5310036	Àrea marina del Sud de Ciutadella (official name: Àrea marina del Sud de Ciutadella); Other names: n/a	39.9243°N 3.9599°E	Looks like this Site of Community Interest has an image. Don't worry, you can take one of your own, and upload it too!
ES5310037	Basses de la marina de Llucmajor (official name: Basses de la marina de Llucmajor); Other names: n/a	39.3984°N 2.8416°E	This Site of Community Interest has no photo. Take one and upload it! Thanks!
ES5310038	Cova des Bufador des Solleric (official name: Cova des Bufador des Solleric); Other names: n/a	39.7517°N 2.7986°E	This Site of Community Interest has no photo. Take one and upload it! Thanks!
ES5310039	Cova de sa Bassa Blanca (official name: Cova de sa Bassa Blanca); Other names: n/a	39.8445°N 3.1816°E	This Site of Community Interest has no photo. Take one and upload it! Thanks!
ES5310040	Cova de les Maravelles (official name: Cova de les Maravelles); Other names: n/a	39.7523°N 2.7839°E	This Site of Community Interest has no photo. Take one and upload it! Thanks!
ES5310041	Cova de Canet (official name: Cova de Canet); Other names: n/a	39.6548°N 2.6274°E	This Site of Community Interest has no photo. Take one and upload it! Thanks!
ES5310042	Avenc d'en Corbera (official name: Avenc d'en Corbera); Other names: n/a	39.6481°N 2.6308°E	This Site of Community Interest has no photo. Take one and upload it! Thanks!
ES5310043	Cova dels Ases (official name: Cova dels Ases); Other names: n/a	39.4335°N 3.2732°E	This Site of Community Interest has no photo. Take one and upload it! Thanks!
ES5310044	Cova des Coll (official name: Cova des Coll); Other names: n/a	39.4291°N 3.2646°E	This Site of Community Interest has no photo. Take one and upload it! Thanks!
ES5310045	Cova d'en Passol (official name: Cova d'en Passol); Other names: n/a	39.3927°N 3.2479°E	Looks like this Site of Community Interest has an image. Don't worry, you can take one of your own, and upload it too!
ES5310046	Cova de ses Rates Pinyades (official name: Cova de ses Rates Pinyades); Other names: n/a	39.7289°N 2.9658°E	This Site of Community Interest has no photo. Take one and upload it! Thanks!
ES5310047	Cova des Corral des Porcs (official name: Cova des Corral des Porcs); Other names: n/a	39.7236°N 2.8622°E	This Site of Community Interest has no photo. Take one and upload it! Thanks!
ES5310048	Cova de sa Guitarreta (official name: Cova de sa Guitarreta); Other names: n/a	39.4086°N 2.9187°E	This Site of Community Interest has no photo. Take one and upload it! Thanks!
ES5310049	Cova des Pas de Vallgornera (official name: Cova des Pas de Vallgornera); Other names: n/a	39.368°N 2.8742°E	Looks like this Site of Community Interest has an image. Don't worry, you can take one of your own, and upload it too!
ES5310050	Cova d'en Bessó (official name: Cova d'en Bessó); Other names: n/a	39.5258°N 3.3174°E	This Site of Community Interest has no photo. Take one and upload it! Thanks!
ES5310051	Cova de can Bordils (official name: Cova de can Bordils); Other names: n/a	39.559°N 3.3528°E	This Site of Community Interest has no photo. Take one and upload it! Thanks!
ES5310052	Cova des Diners (official name: Cova des Diners); Other names: n/a	39.5787°N 3.3302°E	This Site of Community Interest has no photo. Take one and upload it! Thanks!
ES5310053	Cova del Dimoni (official name: Cova del Dimoni); Other names: n/a	39.5451°N 3.3497°E	This Site of Community Interest has no photo. Take one and upload it! Thanks!
ES5310054	Cova de sa Gleda (official name: Cova de sa Gleda); Other names: n/a	39.4996°N 3.2768°E	Looks like this Site of Community Interest has an image. Don't worry, you can take one of your own, and upload it too!
ES5310055	Cova des Pirata (official name: Cova des Pirata); Other names: n/a	39.5073°N 3.2995°E	Looks like this Site of Community Interest has an image. Don't worry, you can take one of your own, and upload it too!
ES5310056	Cova des Pont (official name: Cova des Pont); Other names: n/a	39.5092°N 3.298°E	This Site of Community Interest has no photo. Take one and upload it! Thanks!
ES5310057	Cova de cal Pesso (official name: Cova de cal Pesso); Other names: n/a	39.9167°N 3.0764°E	This Site of Community Interest has no photo. Take one and upload it! Thanks!
ES5310058	Cova de can Sion (official name: Cova de can Sion); Other names: n/a	39.8377°N 2.9965°E	This Site of Community Interest has no photo. Take one and upload it! Thanks!
ES5310059	Cova de Llenaire (official name: Cova de Llenaire); Other names: n/a	39.8873°N 3.0626°E	This Site of Community Interest has no photo. Take one and upload it! Thanks!
ES5310060	Cova Morella (official name: Cova Morella); Other names: n/a	39.8455°N 2.985°E	This Site of Community Interest has no photo. Take one and upload it! Thanks!
ES5310061	Cova Nova de Son Lluís (official name: Cova Nova de Son Lluís); Other names: n/a	39.4821°N 2.9665°E	This Site of Community Interest has no photo. Take one and upload it! Thanks!
ES5310062	Es Bufador de Son Berenguer (official name: Es Bufador de Son Berenguer); Other names: n/a	39.6832°N 2.7672°E	This Site of Community Interest has no photo. Take one and upload it! Thanks!
ES5310063	Cova de can Millo o de Coa Negrina (official name: Cova de can Millo o de Coa Negrina); Other names: n/a	39.7064°N 2.7507°E	This Site of Community Interest has no photo. Take one and upload it! Thanks!
ES5310064	Avenc de Son Pou (official name: Avenc de Son Pou); Other names: n/a	39.7146°N 2.7547°E	Looks like this Site of Community Interest has an image. Don't worry, you can take one of your own, and upload it too!
ES5310065	Cova des Drac de cala Santanyí (official name: Cova des Drac de cala Santanyí); Other names: n/a	39.3313°N 3.1485°E	This Site of Community Interest has no photo. Take one and upload it! Thanks!
ES5310066	Cova des Rafal des Porcs (official name: Cova des Rafal des Porcs); Other names: n/a	39.3276°N 3.0859°E	This Site of Community Interest has no photo. Take one and upload it! Thanks!
ES5310067	Cova dels Estudiants (official name: Cova dels Estudiants); Other names: n/a	39.7591°N 2.7132°E	This Site of Community Interest has no photo. Take one and upload it! Thanks!
ES5310068	Cap Negre (official name: Cap Negre, Menorca|Cap Negre); Other names: n/a	39.9499°N 3.824°E	This Site of Community Interest has no photo. Take one and upload it! Thanks!
ES5310069	Cala d'Algairens (official name: Cala d'Algairens); Other names: n/a	40.0548°N 3.9124°E	Looks like this Site of Community Interest has an image. Don't worry, you can take one of your own, and upload it too!
ES5310070	Punta Redona - Arenal d'en Castell (official name: Punta Redona - Arenal d'en Castell); Other names: n/a	40.0403°N 4.184°E	Looks like this Site of Community Interest has an image. Don't worry, you can take one of your own, and upload it too!
ES5310071	Cala en Brut (official name: Cala en Brut); Other names: n/a	40.0059°N 4.2161°E	Looks like this Site of Community Interest has an image. Don't worry, you can take one of your own, and upload it too!
ES5310072	Caleta de Binillautí (official name: Caleta de Binillautí); Other names: n/a	39.9316°N 4.2875°E	Looks like this Site of Community Interest has an image. Don't worry, you can take one of your own, and upload it too!
ES5310073	Àrea marina Punta Prima - Illa de l'Aire (official name: Àrea marina Punta Prima - Illa de l'Aire); Other names: n/a	39.7959°N 4.291°E	Looks like this Site of Community Interest has an image. Don't worry, you can take one of your own, and upload it too!
ES5310074	De cala Llucalari a Cales Coves (official name: De cala Llucalari a Cales Coves); Other names: n/a	39.871°N 4.1059°E	Looks like this Site of Community Interest has an image. Don't worry, you can take one of your own, and upload it too!
ES5310075	Arenal de Son Saura (official name: Arenal de Son Saura); Other names: n/a	39.9188°N 3.8657°E	Looks like this Site of Community Interest has an image. Don't worry, you can take one of your own, and upload it too!
ES5310076	Serral d'en Salat (official name: Serral d'en Salat); Other names: n/a	39.5919°N 2.3563°E	This Site of Community Interest has no photo. Take one and upload it! Thanks!
ES5310077	Es Rajolí (official name: Es Rajolí); Other names: n/a	39.6181°N 2.3809°E	Looks like this Site of Community Interest has an image. Don't worry, you can take one of your own, and upload it too!
ES5310078	De Cala de Ses Ortigues a cala Estellencs (official name: De Cala de Ses Ortigues a cala Estellencs); Other names: n/a	39.641°N 2.4527°E	Looks like this Site of Community Interest has an image. Don't worry, you can take one of your own, and upload it too!
ES5310079	Puig de na Bauçà (official name: Puig de na Bauçà); Other names: n/a	39.5938°N 2.5206°E	This Site of Community Interest has no photo. Take one and upload it! Thanks!
ES5310080	Puigpunyent (official name: Puigpunyent); Other names: n/a	39.6203°N 2.5543°E	Looks like this Site of Community Interest has an image. Don't worry, you can take one of your own, and upload it too!
ES5310081	Port des Canonge (official name: Port des Canonge); Other names: n/a	39.6938°N 2.5421°E	Looks like this Site of Community Interest has an image. Don't worry, you can take one of your own, and upload it too!
ES5310082	S'Estaca - Punta de Deià (official name: S'Estaca - Punta de Deià); Other names: n/a	39.74°N 2.6072°E	Looks like this Site of Community Interest has an image. Don't worry, you can take one of your own, and upload it too!
ES5310083	Es Boixos (official name: Es Boixos); Other names: n/a	39.7496°N 2.6865°E	Looks like this Site of Community Interest has an image. Don't worry, you can take one of your own, and upload it too!
ES5310084	Torre Picada (official name: Torre Picada); Other names: n/a	39.8123°N 2.7118°E	Looks like this Site of Community Interest has an image. Don't worry, you can take one of your own, and upload it too!
ES5310085	Moncaire (official name: Moncaire); Other names: n/a	39.8115°N 2.7615°E	Looks like this Site of Community Interest has an image. Don't worry, you can take one of your own, and upload it too!
ES5310086	Monnàber (official name: Monnàber); Other names: n/a	39.7995°N 2.7672°E	This Site of Community Interest has no photo. Take one and upload it! Thanks!
ES5310087	Bàlitx (official name: Bàlitx); Other names: n/a	39.8359°N 2.7737°E	Looks like this Site of Community Interest has an image. Don't worry, you can take one of your own, and upload it too!
ES5310088	Gorg Blau (official name: Gorg Blau); Other names: n/a	39.8087°N 2.8291°E	Looks like this Site of Community Interest has an image. Don't worry, you can take one of your own, and upload it too!
ES5310089	Biniarroi (official name: Biniarroi); Other names: n/a	39.7689°N 2.838°E	This Site of Community Interest has no photo. Take one and upload it! Thanks!
ES5310090	Puig d'Alaró - Puig de s'Alcadena (official name: Puig d'Alaró - Puig de s'Alcadena); Other names: n/a	39.7457°N 2.8079°E	Looks like this Site of Community Interest has an image. Don't worry, you can take one of your own, and upload it too!
ES5310091	Mossa (official name: Mossa); Other names: n/a	39.8492°N 2.8960000000000004°E	This Site of Community Interest has no photo. Take one and upload it! Thanks!
ES5310092	Muntanyes de Pollença (official name: Muntanyes de Pollença); Other names: n/a	39.8427°N 2.9774°E	Looks like this Site of Community Interest has an image. Don't worry, you can take one of your own, and upload it too!
ES5310093	Formentor (official name: Formentor); Other names: n/a	39.9365°N 3.1493°E	Looks like this Site of Community Interest has an image. Don't worry, you can take one of your own, and upload it too!
ES5310094	Cala Figuera (official name: Cala Figuera); Other names: n/a	39.9564°N 3.184°E	Looks like this Site of Community Interest has an image. Don't worry, you can take one of your own, and upload it too!
ES5310095	Can Picafort (official name: Can Picafort); Other names: n/a	39.7555°N 3.1809°E	Looks like this Site of Community Interest has an image. Don't worry, you can take one of your own, and upload it too!
ES5310096	Punta de n'Amer (official name: Punta de n'Amer); Other names: n/a	39.5812°N 3.4021°E	Looks like this Site of Community Interest has an image. Don't worry, you can take one of your own, and upload it too!
ES5310097	Àrea marina Costa de Llevant (official name: Àrea marina Costa de Llevant); Other names: n/a	39.485°N 3.3177°E	Looks like this Site of Community Interest has an image. Don't worry, you can take one of your own, and upload it too!
ES5310098	Cales de Manacor (official name: Cales de Manacor); Other names: n/a	39.4817°N 3.2916°E	Looks like this Site of Community Interest has an image. Don't worry, you can take one of your own, and upload it too!
ES5310099	Portocolom (official name: Portocolom); Other names: n/a	39.4221°N 3.2665°E	Looks like this Site of Community Interest has an image. Don't worry, you can take one of your own, and upload it too!
ES5310100	Punta des Ras (official name: Punta des Ras); Other names: n/a	39.3954°N 3.2536°E	Looks like this Site of Community Interest has an image. Don't worry, you can take one of your own, and upload it too!
ES5310101	Puig de Randa (official name: Randa); Other names: n/a	39.5335°N 2.9449°E	Looks like this Site of Community Interest has an image. Don't worry, you can take one of your own, and upload it too!
ES5310102	Xorrigo (official name: Xorrigo); Other names: n/a	39.591°N 2.8224°E	Looks like this Site of Community Interest has an image. Don't worry, you can take one of your own, and upload it too!
ES5310103	Àrea marina Cap de cala Figuera (official name: Àrea marina Cap de cala Figuera); Other names: n/a	39.4669°N 2.5286°E	This Site of Community Interest has no photo. Take one and upload it! Thanks!
ES5310104	Costa de l'Oest d'Eivissa (official name: Costa de l'Oest d'Eivissa); Other names: n/a	38.8753°N 1.2247°E	Looks like this Site of Community Interest has an image. Don't worry, you can take one of your own, and upload it too!
ES5310105	Es Amunts d'Eivissa (official name: Es Amunts d'Eivissa); Other names: n/a	39.0531°N 1.3657°E	Looks like this Site of Community Interest has an image. Don't worry, you can take one of your own, and upload it too!
ES5310106	Àrea marina de ses Margalides (official name: Àrea marina de ses Margalides); Other names: n/a	39.0504°N 1.32°E	Looks like this Site of Community Interest has an image. Don't worry, you can take one of your own, and upload it too!
ES5310107	Àrea marina de Tagomago (official name: Àrea marina de Tagomago); Other names: n/a	39.0253°N 1.6273°E	Looks like this Site of Community Interest has an image. Don't worry, you can take one of your own, and upload it too!
ES5310109	Àrea marina de cala Saona (official name: Àrea marina de cala Saona); Other names: n/a	38.7061°N 1.3799°E	Looks like this Site of Community Interest has an image. Don't worry, you can take one of your own, and upload it too!
ES5310110	Àrea marina Platja de Tramuntana (official name: Àrea marina Platja de Tramuntana); Other names: n/a	38.6985°N 1.5062°E	Looks like this Site of Community Interest has an image. Don't worry, you can take one of your own, and upload it too!
ES5310111	Àrea marina Platja de Migjorn (official name: Àrea marina Platja de Migjorn); Other names: n/a	38.657°N 1.5147°E	Looks like this Site of Community Interest has an image. Don't worry, you can take one of your own, and upload it too!
ES5310112	Nord de Sant Joan (official name: Nord de Sant Joan); Other names: n/a	39.0896°N 1.5614°E	Looks like this Site of Community Interest has an image. Don't worry, you can take one of your own, and upload it too!
ES5310113	La Vall (official name: La Vall); Other names: n/a	40.0351°N 3.9386°E	Looks like this Site of Community Interest has an image. Don't worry, you can take one of your own, and upload it too!
ES5310114	Binigafull (official name: Binigafull); Other names: n/a	40.0313°N 3.8927°E	This Site of Community Interest has no photo. Take one and upload it! Thanks!
ES5310115	Es Molinet (official name: Es Molinet); Other names: n/a	40.005°N 4.1787°E	This Site of Community Interest has no photo. Take one and upload it! Thanks!
ES5310116	Biniatrum (official name: Biniatrum); Other names: n/a	39.9873°N 4.004°E	This Site of Community Interest has no photo. Take one and upload it! Thanks!
ES5310117	Ses Pallisses (official name: Ses Pallisses); Other names: n/a	39.999°N 3.9978°E	This Site of Community Interest has no photo. Take one and upload it! Thanks!
ES5310118	Torre Llafuda (official name: Torre Llafuda); Other names: n/a	39.9949°N 3.9272°E	This Site of Community Interest has no photo. Take one and upload it! Thanks!
ES5310119	Penyes d'Egipte (official name: Penyes d'Egipte); Other names: n/a	39.9527°N 4.2005°E	Looks like this Site of Community Interest has an image. Don't worry, you can take one of your own, and upload it too!
ES5310120	Es Clot des Guix (official name: Es Clot des Guix); Other names: n/a	39.9642°N 4.1855°E	This Site of Community Interest has no photo. Take one and upload it! Thanks!
ES5310121	Binigurdó (official name: Binigurdó); Other names: n/a	40.0039°N 4.1109°E	This Site of Community Interest has no photo. Take one and upload it! Thanks!
ES5310122	Mal Lloc (official name: Mal Lloc); Other names: n/a	39.9988°N 3.9456°E	This Site of Community Interest has no photo. Take one and upload it! Thanks!
ES5310123	Bassa de Formentera (official name: Bassa de Formentera); Other names: n/a	38.6978°N 1.4459°E	This Site of Community Interest has no photo. Take one and upload it! Thanks!
ES5310124	Bassa de Sant Francesc (official name: Bassa de Sant Francesc); Other names: n/a	38.7066°N 1.4398°E	This Site of Community Interest has no photo. Take one and upload it! Thanks!
ES5310125	Albufera de Mallorca (official name: Albufera de Mallorca); Other names: n/a	39.7902°N 3.0946°E	Looks like this Site of Community Interest has an image. Don't worry, you can take one of your own, and upload it too!
ES5310126	Puig Malet i Santa Eularieta (official name: Puig Malet i Santa Eularieta); Other names: n/a	39.1147°N 4.1139°E	This Site of Community Interest has no photo. Take one and upload it! Thanks!
ES5310127	Costa Brava de Tramuntana (official name: Costa Brava de Tramuntana); Other names: n/a	39.9104°N 2.9958°E	Looks like this Site of Community Interest has an image. Don't worry, you can take one of your own, and upload it too!
ES5310128	Cap Enderrocat i cap Blanc (official name: Cap Enderrocat i cap Blanc); Other names: n/a	39.3765°N 2.8041°E	Looks like this Site of Community Interest has an image. Don't worry, you can take one of your own, and upload it too!

== See also ==
- List of Sites of Community Importance in Spain
