= Mard =

Mard or MARD may refer to:

== Films ==
- Mard (1985 film), a Hindi-language Indian film directed by Manmohan Desai
- Mard (1998 film), a Hindi-language Indian film directed by Ganpa Bohra

== Places ==
- Mard-e Khaneh or Mard, a village in Chaharmahal and Bakhtiari Province, Iran
- Mared (village) or Mārd, a village in Khuzestan Province, Iran
- Mard Castle, in Dumat Al-Jandal, Saudi Arabia

== Organisations ==
- Maharashtra Association of Resident Doctors, an Indian medical association
- Men Against Rape and Discrimination, an Indian social campaign
- Ministry of Agriculture and Rural Development (Vietnam), a government ministry in Vietnam

== Other uses ==
- Main assisted reserve deployment, a skydive safety device
- Mean absolute relative difference (MARD), of noninvasive glucose monitors
- Olof Mård (born 1989), Swedish footballer

== See also ==
- Mard o mard (literally man to man), an ancient Persian tradition of single combat
- Marad (disambiguation)
- Khard Mard (disambiguation)
- Saint-Mard (disambiguation)
- Shir-e Mard (disambiguation)
- Mardana (disambiguation)
- Mart (disambiguation)
