= Marts =

MARTS or Marts may refer to:

== People ==
- Marts (surname)

== Places ==
- Marts, Lori, a village in Lori Province, Armenia
- Marts Peak, in the Sentinel Range of the Ellsworth Mountains, Antarctica

== Other ==
- Malaysian Amateur Radio Transmitters' Society
- USS Marts (DE-174), a World War II U.S. Navy destroyer escort

== See also ==
- Mart (disambiguation)
- Marte (disambiguation)
- Martes (disambiguation)
