= Martes (disambiguation) =

Martes is the genus within the family Mustelidae that comprises martens. It may also refer to:

- Francis Martes (born 1995), Dominican former baseball pitcher
- Martes (Aragón), Spain, a locality
- 5026 Martes, an asteroid

== See also ==
- Marte (disambiguation)
- Marts (disambiguation)
- Mart (disambiguation)
