= Marad (disambiguation) =

Marad is an ancient Sumerian city in modern-day Iraq.

Marad also may refer to:

- Marad Beach a village in Kerala, India
  - Marad massacre, the 2003 religiously charged killing of eight Hindu men by Islamist terrorists in Kerala, India
- MARAD, the United States Maritime Administration
- Mārad, or Mared, a village in Khuzestan Province, Iran

== See also ==
- Mard (disambiguation)
- Mared (disambiguation)
- Maradi (disambiguation)
- Marda (disambiguation)
