= Veral (river) =

River in Spain

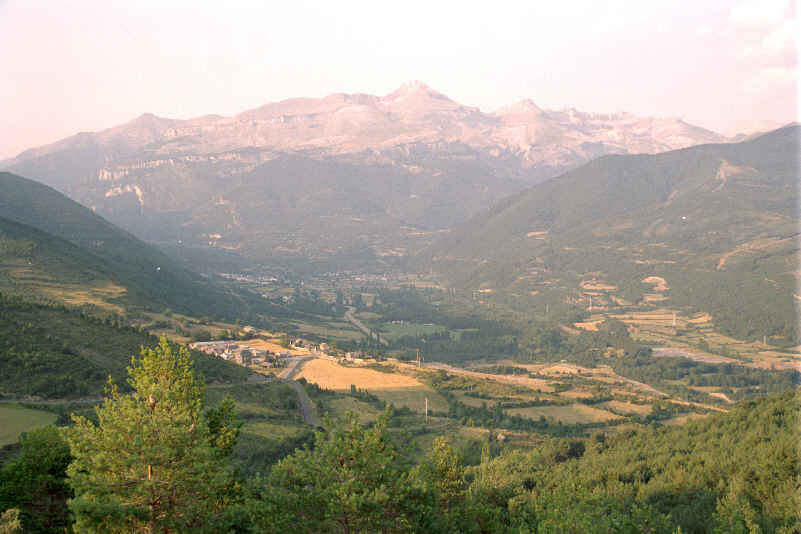
- Valley of the Aragón, through which the Veral river flows.
- Interactive map of Veral
- Coordinates: 42°36′11″N 0°54′45″W
- Part of: Ebro river
- Primary inflows: Cirque of Zuriza
- Primary outflows: Villarreal de la Canal
- Basin countries: Spain

The Veral river is a tributary of the Aragon in the province of Huesca (Spain), which flows into the town of Berdún and after passing through Ansó.

== Course of the river ==
It is considered that this river begins in Zuriza, an ancient Pyrenean glacial cirque; where it also receives the waters of the Petretxema ravine, which rises in Linza. It flows through the Valle de Ansó until it reaches the municipality of Villarreal de la Canal, where it empties its waters into the Aragón river.

Due to the action of erosion, and because of the calcareous terrain it crosses, it has transformed its natural course in certain areas, excavating some formations such as the so-called Foz de Biniés.

== Leisure ==
There are different leisure options to take advantage of the natural slope in whitewater that the river offers in some sections, and the variety of landscapes through which it flows. The most popular is the practice of canoeing.
