= Mardin (surname) =

Mardin is a Turkish surname. Notable people with the surname include:

- Arif Mardin (1932–2006), Turkish-American music producer
- Joe Mardin, American record producer
- Şemsettin Mardin, Turkish diplomat
- Şerif Mardin (1927–2017), Turkish academic
