= Sult =

Sult, Sults, SULT, or SULTs may refer to:

- Sult (novel) or Hunger, an 1890 novel by Knut Hamsun
  - Sult (film) or Hunger, a 1966 adaptation of Hamsun's novel, directed by Henning Carlsen
- Sult, Albania, a village in the Gramsh municipality, Elbasan County, central Albania
- Sulfotransferase, enzymes that catalyze the transfer of a sulfo group
- Tim Sult, American rock guitarist
- Märt Sults (born 1961), Estonian politician

== See also ==
- Salt (disambiguation)
- Jean-de-Dieu Soult (1769–1851), French general and statesman
