= List of Sites of Community Importance in Aragon =

This is a list of Sites of Community Importance in Aragon.

ID	Name	Coordinates	Image
ES0000016	Ordesa y Monte Perdido National Park (official name: Ordesa y Monte Perdido); Other names: n/a	42.64°N 0.0319°W	Looks like this Site of Community Interest has an image. Don't worry, you can take one of your own, and upload it too!
ES0000149	Posets-Maladeta Natural Park (official name: Posets - Maladeta); Other names: n/a	42.64°N 0.5308°E	Looks like this Site of Community Interest has an image. Don't worry, you can take one of your own, and upload it too!
ES2410001	Los Valles - Sur (official name: Los Valles - Sur); Other names: n/a	42.7439°N 0.7686°W	Looks like this Site of Community Interest has an image. Don't worry, you can take one of your own, and upload it too!
ES2410002	Pico y Turberas del Anayet (official name: Pico y Turberas del Anayet); Other names: n/a	42.7844°N 0.4394°W	Looks like this Site of Community Interest has an image. Don't worry, you can take one of your own, and upload it too!
ES2410003	Los Valles (official name: Los Valles); Other names: n/a	42.81°N 0.68°W	Looks like this Site of Community Interest has an image. Don't worry, you can take one of your own, and upload it too!
ES2410004	San Juan de La Peña (official name: San Juan de La Peña); Other names: n/a	42.51°N 0.65°W	Looks like this Site of Community Interest has an image. Don't worry, you can take one of your own, and upload it too!
ES2410005	Sierra y Cañones de Guara Natural Park (official name: Guara Norte); Other names: n/a	42.29°N 0.23°W	Looks like this Site of Community Interest has an image. Don't worry, you can take one of your own, and upload it too!
ES2410006	Bujaruelo - Garganta de Los Navarros (official name: Bujaruelo - Garganta de Los Navarros); Other names: n/a	42.71°N 0.14°W	Looks like this Site of Community Interest has an image. Don't worry, you can take one of your own, and upload it too!
ES2410008	Garganta de Obarra (official name: Garganta de Obarra); Other names: n/a	42.41°N 0.62°E	This Site of Community Interest has no photo. Take one and upload it! Thanks!
ES2410009	Congosto de Ventamillo (official name: Congosto de Ventamillo); Other names: n/a	42.49°N 0.46°E	Looks like this Site of Community Interest has an image. Don't worry, you can take one of your own, and upload it too!
ES2410010	Monte Pacino (official name: Monte Pacino); Other names: n/a	42.75°N 0.35°W	Looks like this Site of Community Interest has an image. Don't worry, you can take one of your own, and upload it too!
ES2410011	Cabecera del Río Aguas Limpias (official name: Cabecera del Río Aguas Limpias); Other names: n/a	42.82°N 0.29°W	Looks like this Site of Community Interest has an image. Don't worry, you can take one of your own, and upload it too!
ES2410012	Foz de Biniés (official name: Foz de Biniés); Other names: n/a	42.65°N 0.79°W	Looks like this Site of Community Interest has an image. Don't worry, you can take one of your own, and upload it too!
ES2410013	Macizo de Cotiella (official name: Macizo de Cotiella); Other names: n/a	42.52°N 0.32°E	Looks like this Site of Community Interest has an image. Don't worry, you can take one of your own, and upload it too!
ES2410014	Garcipollera - Selva de Villanúa (official name: Garcipollera - Selva de Villanúa); Other names: n/a	42.64°N 0.48°W	Looks like this Site of Community Interest has an image. Don't worry, you can take one of your own, and upload it too!
ES2410015	Monte Peiró - Arguis (official name: Monte Peiró - Arguis); Other names: n/a	42.31°N 0.5°W	Looks like this Site of Community Interest has an image. Don't worry, you can take one of your own, and upload it too!
ES2410016	Santa María de Ascaso (official name: Santa María de Ascaso); Other names: n/a	42.47°N 0.036944°E	Looks like this Site of Community Interest has an image. Don't worry, you can take one of your own, and upload it too!
ES2410017	Aragon (river) (official name: Río Aragón (Jaca)); Other names: n/a	42.55°N 0.63°W	Looks like this Site of Community Interest has an image. Don't worry, you can take one of your own, and upload it too!
ES2410018	Río Gallego (Ribera de Biescas) (official name: Río Gallego (Ribera de Biescas)); Other names: n/a	42.6°N 0.31916700000000003°W	Looks like this Site of Community Interest has an image. Don't worry, you can take one of your own, and upload it too!
ES2410019	Río Cinca (Valle de Pineta) (official name: Río Cinca (Valle de Pineta)); Other names: n/a	42.65°N 0.12°E	Looks like this Site of Community Interest has an image. Don't worry, you can take one of your own, and upload it too!
ES2410021	Curso Alto del Río Aragón (official name: Curso Alto del Río Aragón); Other names: n/a	42.6642°N 0.5467°W	Looks like this Site of Community Interest has an image. Don't worry, you can take one of your own, and upload it too!
ES2410022	Cuevas de Villanúa (official name: Cuevas de Villanúa); Other names: n/a	42.6858°N 0.5278°W	Looks like this Site of Community Interest has an image. Don't worry, you can take one of your own, and upload it too!
ES2410023	Collarada y Canal de Ip (official name: Collarada y Canal de Ip); Other names: n/a	42.7294°N 0.4908°W	Looks like this Site of Community Interest has an image. Don't worry, you can take one of your own, and upload it too!
ES2410024	Telera - Acumuer (official name: Telera - Acumuer); Other names: n/a	42.6394°N 0.3311°W	Looks like this Site of Community Interest has an image. Don't worry, you can take one of your own, and upload it too!
ES2410025	Sierra y Cañones de Guara (official name: Sierra y Cañones de Guara); Other names: n/a	42.2603°N 0.1667°W	Looks like this Site of Community Interest has an image. Don't worry, you can take one of your own, and upload it too!
ES2410026	Congosto de Sopeira (official name: Congosto de Sopeira); Other names: n/a	42.321111°N 0.7275°E	Looks like this Site of Community Interest has an image. Don't worry, you can take one of your own, and upload it too!
ES2410027	Río Aurín (official name: Río Aurín); Other names: n/a	40.6422°N 0.425°W	Looks like this Site of Community Interest has an image. Don't worry, you can take one of your own, and upload it too!
ES2410029	Tendeñera (official name: Tendeñera); Other names: n/a	42.6608°N 0.2108°W	Looks like this Site of Community Interest has an image. Don't worry, you can take one of your own, and upload it too!
ES2410030	Serreta Negra (official name: Serreta Negra); Other names: n/a	41.375833°N 0.076667°E	This Site of Community Interest has no photo. Take one and upload it! Thanks!
ES2410031	Foz Escarrilla - Cucuraza (official name: Foz Escarrilla - Cucuraza); Other names: n/a	42.7489°N 0.3131°W	Looks like this Site of Community Interest has an image. Don't worry, you can take one of your own, and upload it too!
ES2410040	Puertos de Panticosa, Bramatuero y Brazatos (official name: Puertos de Panticosa, Bramatuero y Brazatos); Other names: n/a	42.7822°N 0.1914°W	Looks like this Site of Community Interest has an image. Don't worry, you can take one of your own, and upload it too!
ES2410042	Sierra de Mongay (official name: Sierra de Mongay); Other names: n/a	42.088056°N 0.6525°E	This Site of Community Interest has no photo. Take one and upload it! Thanks!
ES2410044	Puerto de Otal - Cotefablo (official name: Puerto de Otal - Cotefablo); Other names: n/a	42.6069°N 0.2103°W	Looks like this Site of Community Interest has an image. Don't worry, you can take one of your own, and upload it too!
ES2410045	Sobrepuerto (official name: Sobrepuerto); Other names: n/a	42.5678°N 0.2356°W	This Site of Community Interest has no photo. Take one and upload it! Thanks!
ES2410046	Río Ésera (official name: Río Ésera); Other names: n/a	42.5794°N 0.4706°E	Looks like this Site of Community Interest has an image. Don't worry, you can take one of your own, and upload it too!
ES2410048	Río Ara (official name: Río Ara); Other names: n/a	42.6308°N 0.1056°W	Looks like this Site of Community Interest has an image. Don't worry, you can take one of your own, and upload it too!
ES2410049	Río Isábena (official name: Río Isábena); Other names: n/a	42.3236°N 0.5742°E	Looks like this Site of Community Interest has an image. Don't worry, you can take one of your own, and upload it too!
ES2410050	Cuenca del Río Yesa (official name: Cuenca del Río Yesa); Other names: n/a	42.5256°N 0.0478°E	This Site of Community Interest has no photo. Take one and upload it! Thanks!
ES2410051	Cuenca del Río Airés (official name: Cuenca del Río Airés); Other names: n/a	42.5667°N 0.1056°E	This Site of Community Interest has no photo. Take one and upload it! Thanks!
ES2410052	Alto Valle del Cinca (official name: Alto Valle del Cinca); Other names: n/a	42.68°N 0.1903°E	Looks like this Site of Community Interest has an image. Don't worry, you can take one of your own, and upload it too!
ES2410053	Chistau (official name: Chistau); Other names: n/a	42.5883°N 0.3078°E	Looks like this Site of Community Interest has an image. Don't worry, you can take one of your own, and upload it too!
ES2410054	Sierra Ferrera (official name: Sierra Ferrera); Other names: n/a	42.4808°N 0.2669°E	Looks like this Site of Community Interest has an image. Don't worry, you can take one of your own, and upload it too!
ES2410055	Sierra de Arro (official name: Sierra de Arro); Other names: n/a	42.4219°N 0.2303°E	Looks like this Site of Community Interest has an image. Don't worry, you can take one of your own, and upload it too!
ES2410056	Sierra de Chía - Congosto de Seira (official name: Sierra de Chía - Congosto de Seira); Other names: n/a	42.51°N 0.4161°E	This Site of Community Interest has no photo. Take one and upload it! Thanks!
ES2410057	Sierras de Los Valles, Aísa y Borau (official name: Sierras de Los Valles, Aísa y Borau); Other names: n/a	42.720278°N 0.8263889999999999°W	This Site of Community Interest has no photo. Take one and upload it! Thanks!
ES2410058	[[Río Veral]] (official name: Río Veral); Other names: n/a	42.610556°N 0.8561110000000001°W	This Site of Community Interest has no photo. Take one and upload it! Thanks!
ES2410059	El Turbón (official name: El Turbón); Other names: n/a	42.4194°N 0.5067°E	Looks like this Site of Community Interest has an image. Don't worry, you can take one of your own, and upload it too!
ES2410060	Río Aragón-Canal de Berdún (official name: Río Aragón-Canal de Berdún); Other names: n/a	42.600833°N 0.8802780000000001°W	Looks like this Site of Community Interest has an image. Don't worry, you can take one of your own, and upload it too!
ES2410061	Sierras de San Juan de La Peña y Peña Oroel (official name: Sierras de San Juan de La Peña y Peña Oroel); Other names: n/a	42.529444°N 0.636667°W	Looks like this Site of Community Interest has an image. Don't worry, you can take one of your own, and upload it too!
ES2410062	Río Gas (official name: Río Gas); Other names: n/a	42.564444°N 0.524722°W	This Site of Community Interest has no photo. Take one and upload it! Thanks!
ES2410064	Sierras de Santo Domingo y Caballera (official name: Sierras de Santo Domingo y Caballera); Other names: n/a	42.403611°N 0.7744439999999999°W	Looks like this Site of Community Interest has an image. Don't worry, you can take one of your own, and upload it too!
ES2410067	La Guarguera (official name: La Guarguera); Other names: n/a	42.414444°N 0.234167°W	This Site of Community Interest has no photo. Take one and upload it! Thanks!
ES2410068	Silves (official name: Silves); Other names: n/a	42.449722°N 0.0175°E	This Site of Community Interest has no photo. Take one and upload it! Thanks!
ES2410069	Sierra de Esdolomada y Morrones de Güel (official name: Sierra de Esdolomada y Morrones de Güel); Other names: n/a	42.3086°N 0.4694°E	This Site of Community Interest has no photo. Take one and upload it! Thanks!
ES2410070	Sierra del Castillo de Laguarres (official name: Sierra del Castillo de Laguarres); Other names: n/a	42.158056°N 0.496944°E	This Site of Community Interest has no photo. Take one and upload it! Thanks!
ES2410071	Congosto de Olvena (official name: Congosto de Olvena); Other names: n/a	42.105556°N 0.276111°E	Looks like this Site of Community Interest has an image. Don't worry, you can take one of your own, and upload it too!
ES2410072	Lagunas de Estaña (official name: Lagunas de Estaña); Other names: n/a	42.029444°N 0.529167°E	Looks like this Site of Community Interest has an image. Don't worry, you can take one of your own, and upload it too!
ES2410073	Ríos Cinca y Alcanadre (official name: Ríos Cinca y Alcanadre); Other names: n/a	41.691389°N 0.147778°E	Looks like this Site of Community Interest has an image. Don't worry, you can take one of your own, and upload it too!
ES2410074	Yesos de Barbastro (official name: Yesos de Barbastro); Other names: n/a	41.923333°N 0.313333°E	This Site of Community Interest has no photo. Take one and upload it! Thanks!
ES2410075	Basal de Ballobar y Balsalet de Don Juan (official name: Basal de Ballobar y Balsalet de Don Juan); Other names: n/a	41.613889°N 0.139444°E	This Site of Community Interest has no photo. Take one and upload it! Thanks!
ES2410076	Sierras de Alcubierre y Sigena (official name: Sierras de Alcubierre y Sigena); Other names: n/a	41.716667°N 0.421111°W	Looks like this Site of Community Interest has an image. Don't worry, you can take one of your own, and upload it too!
ES2410084	Liberola-Serreta Negra (official name: Liberola-Serreta Negra); Other names: n/a	41.431111°N 0.143333°E	This Site of Community Interest has no photo. Take one and upload it! Thanks!
ES2410150	Cueva de Los Moros (official name: Cueva de Los Moros); Other names: n/a	42.6861°N 0.5278°W	This Site of Community Interest has no photo. Take one and upload it! Thanks!
ES2410154	Turberas del Macizo de Los Infiernos (official name: Turberas del Macizo de Los Infiernos); Other names: n/a	42.7708°N 0.2697°W	Looks like this Site of Community Interest has an image. Don't worry, you can take one of your own, and upload it too!
ES2410155	Turberas de Acumuer (official name: Turberas de Acumuer); Other names: n/a	42.7072°N 0.4283°W	This Site of Community Interest has no photo. Take one and upload it! Thanks!
ES2420030	Sabinares del Puerto de Escadón (official name: Sabinares del Puerto de Escadón); Other names: n/a	40.224444°N 0.997222°W	This Site of Community Interest has no photo. Take one and upload it! Thanks!
ES2420036	Puertos de Beceite (official name: Puertos de Beceite); Other names: n/a	40.795556°N 0.201389°W	Looks like this Site of Community Interest has an image. Don't worry, you can take one of your own, and upload it too!
ES2420037	Sierra de Javalambre (official name: Sierra de Javalambre); Other names: n/a	40.070278°N 0.994167°W	Looks like this Site of Community Interest has an image. Don't worry, you can take one of your own, and upload it too!
ES2420038	Castelfrío - Mas de Tarín (official name: Castelfrío - Mas de Tarín); Other names: n/a	40.470556°N 0.975°W	This Site of Community Interest has no photo. Take one and upload it! Thanks!
ES2420039	Rodeno de Albarracín (official name: Rodeno de Albarracín); Other names: n/a	40.370278000000006°N 1.386667°W	Looks like this Site of Community Interest has an image. Don't worry, you can take one of your own, and upload it too!
ES2420092	Barranco de Valdemesón - Azaila (official name: Barranco de Valdemesón - Azaila); Other names: n/a	41.281111°N 0.454444°W	This Site of Community Interest has no photo. Take one and upload it! Thanks!
ES2420093	Salada de Azaila (official name: Salada de Azaila); Other names: n/a	41.264722°N 0.497778°W	This Site of Community Interest has no photo. Take one and upload it! Thanks!
ES2420099	Sierra de Vizcuerno (official name: Sierra de Vizcuerno); Other names: n/a	41.145°N 0.07194400000000001°W	This Site of Community Interest has no photo. Take one and upload it! Thanks!
ES2420111	Montes de La Cuenca de Gallocanta (official name: Montes de La Cuenca de Gallocanta); Other names: n/a	41.008889°N 1.471667°W	This Site of Community Interest has no photo. Take one and upload it! Thanks!
ES2420112	Las Planetas-Claverías (official name: Las Planetas-Claverías); Other names: n/a	41.160833°N 0.4972220000000001°W	This Site of Community Interest has no photo. Take one and upload it! Thanks!
ES2420113	Parque Cultural del Río Martín (official name: Parque Cultural del Río Martín); Other names: n/a	41.022222°N 0.6286109999999999°W	This Site of Community Interest has no photo. Take one and upload it! Thanks!
ES2420114	Saladas de Alcañiz (official name: Saladas de Alcañiz); Other names: n/a	41.043611°N 0.203889°W	Looks like this Site of Community Interest has an image. Don't worry, you can take one of your own, and upload it too!
ES2420115	Salada de Calanda (official name: Salada de Calanda); Other names: n/a	40.992222°N 0.211944°W	This Site of Community Interest has no photo. Take one and upload it! Thanks!
ES2420116	Río Mezquín y Oscuros (official name: Río Mezquín y Oscuros); Other names: n/a	40.913333°N 0.085°W	This Site of Community Interest has no photo. Take one and upload it! Thanks!
ES2420117	Río Bergantes (official name: Río Bergantes); Other names: n/a	40.824167°N 0.16611099999999998°W	Looks like this Site of Community Interest has an image. Don't worry, you can take one of your own, and upload it too!
ES2420118	Río Algars (official name: Río Algars); Other names: n/a	41.140278°N 0.211111°E	Looks like this Site of Community Interest has an image. Don't worry, you can take one of your own, and upload it too!
ES2420119	Els Ports de Beseit (official name: Els Ports de Beseit); Other names: n/a	40.754444°N 0.110833°E	Looks like this Site of Community Interest has an image. Don't worry, you can take one of your own, and upload it too!
ES2420120	Sierra de Fonfría (official name: Sierra de Fonfría); Other names: n/a	40.990833°N 1.1077780000000002°W	This Site of Community Interest has no photo. Take one and upload it! Thanks!
ES2420121	Yesos de Barrachina y Cutanda (official name: Yesos de Barrachina y Cutanda); Other names: n/a	40.891944°N 1.1588889999999998°W	Looks like this Site of Community Interest has an image. Don't worry, you can take one of your own, and upload it too!
ES2420122	Sabinar de El Villarejo (official name: Sabinar de El Villarejo); Other names: n/a	40.893056°N 1.215556°W	This Site of Community Interest has no photo. Take one and upload it! Thanks!
ES2420123	Sierra Palomera (official name: Sierra Palomera); Other names: n/a	40.771944°N 1.245556°W	This Site of Community Interest has no photo. Take one and upload it! Thanks!
ES2420124	Muelas y Estrechos del Río Guadalope (official name: Muelas y Estrechos del Río Guadalope); Other names: n/a	40.615556°N 0.551111°W	Looks like this Site of Community Interest has an image. Don't worry, you can take one of your own, and upload it too!
ES2420125	Rambla de Las Truchas (official name: Rambla de Las Truchas); Other names: n/a	40.457222°N 0.339444°W	This Site of Community Interest has no photo. Take one and upload it! Thanks!
ES2420126	Maestrazgo y Sierra de Gúdar (official name: Maestrazgo y Sierra de Gúdar); Other names: n/a	40.375833°N 0.649167°W	Looks like this Site of Community Interest has an image. Don't worry, you can take one of your own, and upload it too!
ES2420128	Estrechos del Río Mijares (official name: Estrechos del Río Mijares); Other names: n/a	40.129444°N 0.6738890000000001°W	Looks like this Site of Community Interest has an image. Don't worry, you can take one of your own, and upload it too!
ES2420129	Sierra de Javalambre II (official name: Sierra de Javalambre II); Other names: n/a	40.033333°N 1.033333°W	This Site of Community Interest has no photo. Take one and upload it! Thanks!
ES2420131	Los Yesares y Laguna de Tortajada (official name: Los Yesares y Laguna de Tortajada); Other names: n/a	40.406667°N 1.044722°W	This Site of Community Interest has no photo. Take one and upload it! Thanks!
ES2420132	Altos de Marimezquita, Los Pinarejos y Muela de Cascante (official name: Altos de Marimezquita, Los Pinarejos y Muela de Cascante); Other names: n/a	40.236389°N 1.129722°W	This Site of Community Interest has no photo. Take one and upload it! Thanks!
ES2420133	Loma de Centellas (official name: Loma de Centellas); Other names: n/a	40.129722°N 1.188056°W	This Site of Community Interest has no photo. Take one and upload it! Thanks!
ES2420134	Sabinar de San Blas (official name: Sabinar de San Blas); Other names: n/a	40.345278°N 1.275556°W	This Site of Community Interest has no photo. Take one and upload it! Thanks!
ES2420135	Cuenca del Ebrón (official name: Cuenca del Ebrón); Other names: n/a	40.227778°N 1.354444°W	This Site of Community Interest has no photo. Take one and upload it! Thanks!
ES2420136	Sabinares de Saldón y Valdecuenca (official name: Sabinares de Saldón y Valdecuenca); Other names: n/a	40.341111°N 1.441111°W	This Site of Community Interest has no photo. Take one and upload it! Thanks!
ES2420137	Los Cuadrejones - Dehesa del Saladar (official name: Los Cuadrejones - Dehesa del Saladar); Other names: n/a	40.374444°N 1.5186110000000002°W	This Site of Community Interest has no photo. Take one and upload it! Thanks!
ES2420138	Valdecabriel - Las Tejeras (official name: Valdecabriel - Las Tejeras); Other names: n/a	40.284167°N 1.608889°W	This Site of Community Interest has no photo. Take one and upload it! Thanks!
ES2420139	Alto Tajo y Muela de San Juan (official name: Alto Tajo y Muela de San Juan); Other names: n/a	40.397222°N 1.7466669999999995°W	Looks like this Site of Community Interest has an image. Don't worry, you can take one of your own, and upload it too!
ES2420140	Estrechos del Guadalaviar (official name: Estrechos del Guadalaviar); Other names: n/a	40.40277800000001°N 1.610556°W	Looks like this Site of Community Interest has an image. Don't worry, you can take one of your own, and upload it too!
ES2420141	Tremedales de Orihuela (official name: Tremedales de Orihuela); Other names: n/a	40.465°N 1.6688889999999998°W	Looks like this Site of Community Interest has an image. Don't worry, you can take one of your own, and upload it too!
ES2420142	Sabinar de Monterde de Albarracín (official name: Sabinar de Monterde de Albarracín); Other names: n/a	40.489444°N 1.464444°W	This Site of Community Interest has no photo. Take one and upload it! Thanks!
ES2420145	Cueva de Baticambras (official name: Cueva de Baticambras); Other names: n/a	40.787778°N 0.4588890000000001°W	This Site of Community Interest has no photo. Take one and upload it! Thanks!
ES2420146	Cueva de La Solana (official name: Cueva de La Solana); Other names: n/a	40.728889°N 0.577222°W	This Site of Community Interest has no photo. Take one and upload it! Thanks!
ES2420147	Cueva del Húmero (official name: Cueva del Húmero); Other names: n/a	40.140278°N 0.713333°W	This Site of Community Interest has no photo. Take one and upload it! Thanks!
ES2420148	Cueva del Recuenco (official name: Cueva del Recuenco); Other names: n/a	40.758611°N 0.5855560000000001°W	This Site of Community Interest has no photo. Take one and upload it! Thanks!
ES2420149	Sima del Polo (official name: Sima del Polo); Other names: n/a	40.751389°N 0.500278°W	This Site of Community Interest has no photo. Take one and upload it! Thanks!
ES2430007	Foz de Salvatierra (official name: Foz de Salvatierra); Other names: n/a	42.69°N 1.01°W	This Site of Community Interest has no photo. Take one and upload it! Thanks!
ES2430028	Moncayo (official name: Moncayo); Other names: n/a	41.743611°N 1.759722°W	Looks like this Site of Community Interest has an image. Don't worry, you can take one of your own, and upload it too!
ES2430032	El Planerón (official name: El Planerón); Other names: n/a	41.371667°N 0.616667°W	This Site of Community Interest has no photo. Take one and upload it! Thanks!
ES2430033	Efesa de La Villa (official name: Efesa de La Villa); Other names: n/a	41.2275°N 0.06°W	This Site of Community Interest has no photo. Take one and upload it! Thanks!
ES2430034	Puerto de Codos - Encinacorba (official name: Puerto de Codos - Encinacorba); Other names: n/a	41.301667°N 1.327222°W	Looks like this Site of Community Interest has an image. Don't worry, you can take one of your own, and upload it too!
ES2430035	Sierra de Santa Cruz - Puerto de Used (official name: Sierra de Santa Cruz - Puerto de Used); Other names: n/a	41.1225°N 1.563889°W	This Site of Community Interest has no photo. Take one and upload it! Thanks!
ES2430041	Complejo Lagunar de La Salada de Chiprana (official name: Complejo Lagunar de La Salada de Chiprana); Other names: n/a	41.238889°N 0.180556°W	Looks like this Site of Community Interest has an image. Don't worry, you can take one of your own, and upload it too!
ES2430043	Laguna de Gallocanta (official name: Laguna de Gallocanta); Other names: n/a	40.966667°N 1.55°W	Looks like this Site of Community Interest has an image. Don't worry, you can take one of your own, and upload it too!
ES2430047	Sierras de Leyre y Orba (official name: Sierras de Leyre y Orba); Other names: n/a	42.646111°N 1.023056°W	This Site of Community Interest has no photo. Take one and upload it! Thanks!
ES2430063	Río Onsella (official name: Río Onsella); Other names: n/a	42.483611°N 1.037222°W	Looks like this Site of Community Interest has an image. Don't worry, you can take one of your own, and upload it too!
ES2430065	Río Arba de Luesia (official name: Río Arba de Luesia); Other names: n/a	42.342778°N 1.050278°W	Looks like this Site of Community Interest has an image. Don't worry, you can take one of your own, and upload it too!
ES2430066	Río Arba de Biel (official name: Río Arba de Biel); Other names: n/a	42.286111°N 0.9375°W	Looks like this Site of Community Interest has an image. Don't worry, you can take one of your own, and upload it too!
ES2430077	Bajo Gállego (official name: Bajo Gállego); Other names: n/a	41.848611°N 0.775278°W	Looks like this Site of Community Interest has an image. Don't worry, you can take one of your own, and upload it too!
ES2430078	Montes de Zuera (official name: Montes de Zuera); Other names: n/a	41.936944°N 0.8938889999999999°W	This Site of Community Interest has no photo. Take one and upload it! Thanks!
ES2430079	Loma Negra (official name: Loma Negra); Other names: n/a	42.080556°N 1.311111°W	This Site of Community Interest has no photo. Take one and upload it! Thanks!
ES2430080	El Castellar (official name: El Castellar); Other names: n/a	41.814167°N 1.035°W	This Site of Community Interest has no photo. Take one and upload it! Thanks!
ES2430081	Sotos y Mejanas del Ebro (official name: Sotos y Mejanas del Ebro); Other names: n/a	41.704167°N 0.932222°W	This Site of Community Interest has no photo. Take one and upload it! Thanks!
ES2430082	Monegros (official name: Monegros); Other names: n/a	41.420556°N 0.189167°W	Looks like this Site of Community Interest has an image. Don't worry, you can take one of your own, and upload it too!
ES2430083	Montes de Alfajarín - Saso de Osera (official name: Montes de Alfajarín - Saso de Osera); Other names: n/a	41.598056°N 0.6025°W	This Site of Community Interest has no photo. Take one and upload it! Thanks!
ES2430085	Laguna de Plantados y Laguna de Agón (official name: Laguna de Plantados y Laguna de Agón); Other names: n/a	41.845278°N 1.409444°W	This Site of Community Interest has no photo. Take one and upload it! Thanks!
ES2430086	Monte Alto y Siete Cabezos (official name: Monte Alto y Siete Cabezos); Other names: n/a	41.791389°N 1.3930559999999998°W	This Site of Community Interest has no photo. Take one and upload it! Thanks!
ES2430087	Maderuela (official name: Maderuela); Other names: n/a	41.802778°N 1.7177779999999998°W	This Site of Community Interest has no photo. Take one and upload it! Thanks!
ES2430088	Barranco de Valdeplata (official name: Barranco de Valdeplata); Other names: n/a	41.688611°N 1.682222°W	Looks like this Site of Community Interest has an image. Don't worry, you can take one of your own, and upload it too!
ES2430089	Sierra de Nava Alta - Puerto de La Chabola (official name: Sierra de Nava Alta - Puerto de La Chabola); Other names: n/a	41.634722°N 1.505°W	Looks like this Site of Community Interest has an image. Don't worry, you can take one of your own, and upload it too!
ES2430090	Dehesa de Rueda - Montolar (official name: Dehesa de Rueda - Montolar); Other names: n/a	41.6444°N 1.2286°W	This Site of Community Interest has no photo. Take one and upload it! Thanks!
ES2430091	Planas y Estepas de La Margen derecha del Ebro (official name: Planas y Estepas de La Margen derecha del Ebro); Other names: n/a	41.455556°N 0.8138890000000001°W	Looks like this Site of Community Interest has an image. Don't worry, you can take one of your own, and upload it too!
ES2430094	Meandros del Ebro (official name: Meandros del Ebro); Other names: n/a	41.317778°N 0.36°W	Looks like this Site of Community Interest has an image. Don't worry, you can take one of your own, and upload it too!
ES2430095	Bajo Martín (official name: Bajo Martín); Other names: n/a	41.245278000000006°N 0.336389°W	This Site of Community Interest has no photo. Take one and upload it! Thanks!
ES2430096	Río Guadalope, Val de Fabara y Val de Pilas (official name: Río Guadalope, Val de Fabara y Val de Pilas); Other names: n/a	41.243333°N 0.077778°E	Looks like this Site of Community Interest has an image. Don't worry, you can take one of your own, and upload it too!
ES2430097	Río Matarranya (official name: Río Matarranya); Other names: n/a	41.145833°N 0.139444°E	Looks like this Site of Community Interest has an image. Don't worry, you can take one of your own, and upload it too!
ES2430098	Cueva Honda (official name: Cueva Honda); Other names: n/a	41.641944°N 1.714722°W	This Site of Community Interest has no photo. Take one and upload it! Thanks!
ES2430100	Hoces del Jalón (official name: Hoces del Jalón); Other names: n/a	41.414722°N 1.606111°W	Looks like this Site of Community Interest has an image. Don't worry, you can take one of your own, and upload it too!
ES2430101	Muelas del Jiloca: El Campo y La Torreta (official name: Muelas del Jiloca: El Campo y La Torreta); Other names: n/a	41.275556°N 1.546944°W	This Site of Community Interest has no photo. Take one and upload it! Thanks!
ES2430102	Sierra de Vicort (official name: Sierra de Vicort); Other names: n/a	41.368889°N 1.489167°W	This Site of Community Interest has no photo. Take one and upload it! Thanks!
ES2430103	Sierras de Algairén (official name: Sierras de Algairén); Other names: n/a	41.343889°N 1.376111°W	This Site of Community Interest has no photo. Take one and upload it! Thanks!
ES2430104	Riberas del Jalón (Bubierca - Ateca) (official name: Riberas del Jalón (Bubierca - Ateca)); Other names: n/a	41.319722°N 1.814444°W	This Site of Community Interest has no photo. Take one and upload it! Thanks!
ES2430105	Hoces del Río Mesa (official name: Hoces del Río Mesa); Other names: n/a	41.18°N 1.894444°W	Looks like this Site of Community Interest has an image. Don't worry, you can take one of your own, and upload it too!
ES2430106	Los Romerales - Cerropozuelo (official name: Los Romerales - Cerropozuelo); Other names: n/a	41.14527800000001°N 1.7469439999999998°W	This Site of Community Interest has no photo. Take one and upload it! Thanks!
ES2430107	Sierras de Pardos y Santa Cruz (official name: Sierras de Pardos y Santa Cruz); Other names: n/a	41.105°N 1.585556°W	This Site of Community Interest has no photo. Take one and upload it! Thanks!
ES2430108	Balsa Grande y Balsa Pequeña (official name: Balsa Grande y Balsa Pequeña); Other names: n/a	41.018889°N 1.540833°W	This Site of Community Interest has no photo. Take one and upload it! Thanks!
ES2430109	Hoces de Torralba - Río Piedra (official name: Hoces de Torralba - Río Piedra); Other names: n/a	41.055°N 1.7075°W	Looks like this Site of Community Interest has an image. Don't worry, you can take one of your own, and upload it too!
ES2430110	Alto Huerva - Sierra de Herrera (official name: Alto Huerva - Sierra de Herrera); Other names: n/a	41.221944°N 1.154444°W	Looks like this Site of Community Interest has an image. Don't worry, you can take one of your own, and upload it too!
ES2430127	Sima del Árbol (official name: Sima del Árbol); Other names: n/a	41.462778°N 1.426667°W	This Site of Community Interest has no photo. Take one and upload it! Thanks!
ES2430143	Cueva del Mármol (official name: Cueva del Mármol); Other names: n/a	41.480833°N 1.4275°W	This Site of Community Interest has no photo. Take one and upload it! Thanks!
ES2430144	Cueva del Sudor (official name: Cueva del Sudor); Other names: n/a	41.473889°N 1.46°W	This Site of Community Interest has no photo. Take one and upload it! Thanks!
ES2430151	Cueva del Muerto (official name: Cueva del Muerto); Other names: n/a	41.481667°N 1.428056°W	This Site of Community Interest has no photo. Take one and upload it! Thanks!
ES2430152	Reserva Natural de Los Galachos de La Alfranca de Pastriz, La Cartuja y El Burgo de Ebro (official name: Reserva Natural de Los Galachos de La Alfranca de Pastriz, La Cartuja y El Burgo de Ebro); Other names: n/a	41.59777800000001°N 0.765°W	Looks like this Site of Community Interest has an image. Don't worry, you can take one of your own, and upload it too!
ES2430153	La Lomaza de Belchite (official name: La Lomaza de Belchite); Other names: n/a	41.389722°N 0.705278°W	This Site of Community Interest has no photo. Take one and upload it! Thanks!

== See also ==
- List of Sites of Community Importance in Spain
