= Märt =

Male given name

- Gender: Male
- Language: Estonian

Origin
- Region of origin: Estonia

Other names
- Related names: Märten, Mart, Martin, Märtin, Marten

Märt is an Estonian masculine given name, a version of Martin.

People named Märt include:

- Märt Avandi (born 1981), actor
- Märt Israel (born 1983), discus thrower
- Märt Kalbus, actor
- Märt Kermon (born 1940), basketball player and basketball coach
- Märt Kosemets (born 1981), football player
- Märt Kubo (born 1944), theatre pedagogue, critic and politician
- Märt Läänemets (born 1962), sinologist
- Märt-Matis Lill (born 1975), composer
- Märt Meos (1881–1966), educator and politician
- Märt Pius (born 1989), actor
- Märt Põder (born 1979), philosopher, freedom of information activist, presenter, publicist and translator
- Märt Rask (born 1950), jurist and politician
- Märt Ringmaa (1938–2021), convicted bomber
- Märt Sults (born 1961), politician
- Märt Tiru (1947–2005), Brigadier General
- Märt Treier (born 1975), TV and radio journalist (:et)
- Märt Väljataga (born 1965), literary scientist, critic and translator
- Märt Visnapuu (1962–2025), actor
