= Mårten =

Mårten is a masculine given name. People bearing the name include:

- Mårten Andersson (born 1974), Swedish bassist with Lizzy Borden
- Mårten Boström (born 1982), Finnish orienteering competitor and long-distance runner
- Mårten Falk (born 1973), Swedish classical guitarist
- Mårten Hagström (born 1971), Swedish guitarist with Meshuggah
- Mårten Klingberg (born 1968), Swedish actor, screenwriter and director
- Mårten Mickos (born 1962), Finnish software executive
- Mårten Olander (born 1971), Swedish golfer
- Mårten Palme (born 1961), Swedish economist
- Mårten Renström (born 1972), Swedish tennis player
- Mårten Triewald (1691–1747), Swedish merchant, engineer and physicist
- Mårten Eskil Winge (1825–1896), Swedish mythology painter

== See also ==
- Marten (given name)
- Märten (name), a given name and surname
