= Mardin (disambiguation) =

Mardin is a city in southeastern Turkey.

Mardin may also refer to:

- Mardin (surname)
- Mardin mine
- Mardin Railway Station
- Mardin Airport
