= Shir-e Mard =

Shir-e Mard or Shir Mard (Persian: شيرمرد) may refer to:

- Shir-e Mard, Bushehr
- Shir Mard, Chaharmahal and Bakhtiari
- Shir Mard, Fars
- Shir Mard, West Azerbaijan
