= Marda =

Marda may refer to:

- Marad, the ancient Sumerian city of Marda
- Marda, Salfit, Palestinian town located in the Salfit Governorate
- Marda, Gumla, a village in Jharkhand, India
- Masada, known as Marda in the Byzantine period (from Syriac marda, 'fortress')

== People with the surname ==
- Neha Marda (born 1985), Indian actress

== See also ==
- Marad (disambiguation)
