= Mert (given name) =

- Gender: Male

Origin
- Origin: Turkish
- Meaning: brave, manful, trustworthy
- Region of origin: Turkey

Mert is a Turkish masculine given name, meaning "manful", "brave", "trustworthy", and/or "the one who tells the truth", from Persian mard (مرد) which means man. It is very popular in Turkey. It is also a nickname.

== Given name ==
- Mert Alas (born 1971), British fashion photographer of Turkish origin
- Mert Aytuğ (born 1984), Turkish racing car driver and motorcycle racer
- Mert Efe Kılıçer (born 2004), Turkish artistic gymnast
- Mert Erdoğan (born 1989), Turkish footballer
- Mert Girmalegesse (born 1987), Turkish long-distance athlete of Ethiopian origin
- Mert Günok (born 1989), Turkish international footballer
- Mert Korkmaz (born 1971), Turkish footballer
- Mert Lawwill (born 1940), American motorcycle racer
- Mert Mutlu (born 1974), Turkish cyclist and coach
- Mert Müldür (born 1999), Turkish international footballer
- Mert Öcal (born 1982), Turkish model
- Mert Shumpert (born 1979), Turkish basketball player of American origin
- Mert Somay (born 1986), Turkish footballer
- Mert Yazıcıoğlu (born 1993), Turkish actor
- Mert Yücel, Turkish electronic music producer

== Nickname ==
- Mert Hackett (1859–1938), American baseball player
- Márcio Nobre (born 1980), Brazilian footballer

== See also ==
- Märt, an Estonian masculine given name
