= Marradi (disambiguation) =

Marradi is an Italian municipality in the Metropolitan City of Florence.

Marradi may also refer to:

- Giovanni Marradi (1852–1922), Italian poet
- Giovanni Marradi (musician) (born 1952), Italian composer, pianist, arranger and television presenter

== See also ==
- Maradi (disambiguation)
