= Mardan (disambiguation) =

Mardan is a city in Pakistan.

Mardan may also refer to:

== Places ==
=== Pakistan ===
- Mardan Division, Khyber Pakhtunkhwa province
  - Mardan District, one of two districts in the division
    - Mardan Tehsil, an administrative subdivision (tehsil) of Mardan District
- Mardan Cantonment, a cantonment in the centre of the city of Mardan

=== Iran ===
- Mardan, Iran, a village

== People ==
- Mardan Mamat (born 1967), Singaporean golfer
- Mardan Musayev (1907–1982), Azerbaijani Red Army senior sergeant and Hero of the Soviet Union
- Azad Ari Mardan (born 1972), Indian politician
- Mihr Mardan (died 755), third ruler of the Iranian Bavand dynasty

== Other uses ==
- Mardan (film), a 2014 Iraqi drama film directed by Batin Ghobadi
- Mardan Palace, a luxury hotel in Lara, Antalya, Turkey
- Mardan Sports Complex, a multi-purpose stadium in Aksu, Antalya, Turkey

== See also ==
- Mardana (disambiguation)
- Mardin (disambiguation)
- Mardani, a surname
