= Şemsettin Mardin =

Turkish ambassador

Şemsettin Mardin was one of the Turkish ambassadors.

== Biography ==
Mardin was born in Egypt. He was a member of very long-established family. He was uncle to Arif Mardin and Betul Mardin.

Mardin served as the ambassador of Turkey to Lebanon from January 1960 to January 1962. He married Reya Hanim, daughter of Ahmed Cevdet who founded the daily Ikdam. Their son, Şerif Mardin, was an academic. After retiring from diplomatic post, Şemsettin Mardin settled in Maadi, a district of Cairo and died there.
