= Paul von Hase =

German general (1885–1944)

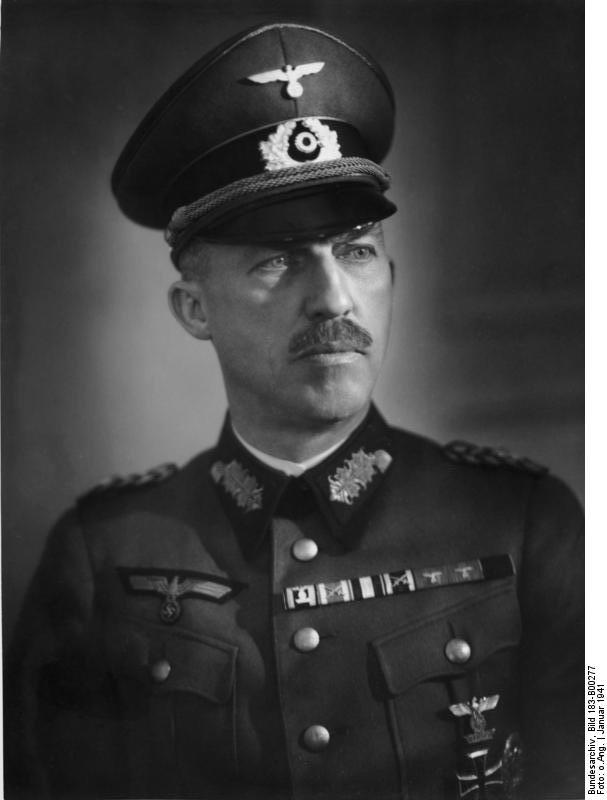
- Hase in 1941
- Born: 24 July 1885; Hanover, Hanover, Prussia, Germany
- Died: 8 August 1944 (aged 59); Plötzensee Prison, Berlin, Nazi Germany
- Cause of death: Execution by hanging
- Relatives: Karl Hase (grandfather); Karl-Günther von Hase (nephew); Dietrich Bonhoeffer (nephew)
- Military career
- Allegiance: German Empire; Weimar Republic; Nazi Germany
- Branch: German Army
- Service years: 1905–1944
- Rank: Generalleutnant
- Conflicts: World War I World War II

Karl Paul Immanuel von Hase (24 July 1885 – 8 August 1944) was a German career soldier and figured among the members of the resistance against Adolf Hitler's Nazi regime.

== Life ==
Von Hase was born in Hanover. He was the fifth and last child of Oberstabsarzt Dr. med. Paul Erwin von Hase (1840–1918) and his wife Maria Elise Friederike "Frieda" née Sperber (1849–1943). His three brothers were also officers, but of the reserves. Brother Dr. jur. Karl Benidikt von Hase was killed in action as 2nd Lieutenant of the Reserves with the Füsilier-Regiment „Königin“ (Schleswig-Holsteinisches) Nr. 86 on 5 October 1914 near Saint-Mard.

On 12 December 1921, von Hase married Margarethe Baronesse von Funck (1898–1968) in Neustrelitz. They had four children: Ina, Maria-Gisela, Alexander and Friedrich-Wilhelm.

=== Biography ===
After graduating from Joachimsthalschen Gymnasium in Berlin in 1904, he began studying law at the Friedrich Wilhelm University in Berlin. In 1905, von Hase joined the Kaiser Alexander Guard Grenadier Regiment No. 1 of the Prussian Army as a one-year volunteer, decided to become an active officer and completed officer training, which was followed by promotion to 2nd Lieutenant on 27 January 1907 (with patent from 1905). During the First World War, von Hase completed several commands as a platoon leader and in the general staff. At the end of the war he was a Hauptmann (Captain). He then served with the Freikorps under Alfred Georg Friedrich Kuno Karl von Randow and with the Grenzschutz Ost. He was taken over by the Reichswehr in 1920.

He held the following posts in the Reichswehr/Wehrmacht during the time of the Third Reich:

- 1933–1934 Battalion commander in Neuruppin;
- 1934–1935 Battalion commander in Landsberg an der Warthe;
- 1935–1938 Commander 50th Regiment;
- 1939–1940 Commander 46th Division;
- 1940 Commander 56th Division;
- 1940–1944 City commandant of Berlin.

From 1938, Brigadier-General von Hase was privy to the conspiracy plans plotted by such men as Wilhelm Canaris, Hans Oster, Generals Erwin von Witzleben, Franz Halder and Erich Hoepner. He was an uncle of Dietrich Bonhoeffer, the famous Lutheran pastor who also took part in the conspiracy.

On 20 July 1944, after the failed assassination of Hitler at the Wolf's Lair in East Prussia, Hase ordered Major Otto Ernst Remer of the Guard Battalion (Wach-Bataillon) Großdeutschland to seal off the government quarter in Berlin during the subsequent coup d'état attempt. Remer later removed the cordon and Hase was arrested by the Gestapo that evening whilst he was dining with Joseph Goebbels.

In the trial against him and a number of other members of the plot at the Volksgerichtshof on 8 August 1944, he was sentenced to death and hanged later the same day at Plötzensee Prison in Berlin.

== Awards and decorations (excerpt) ==
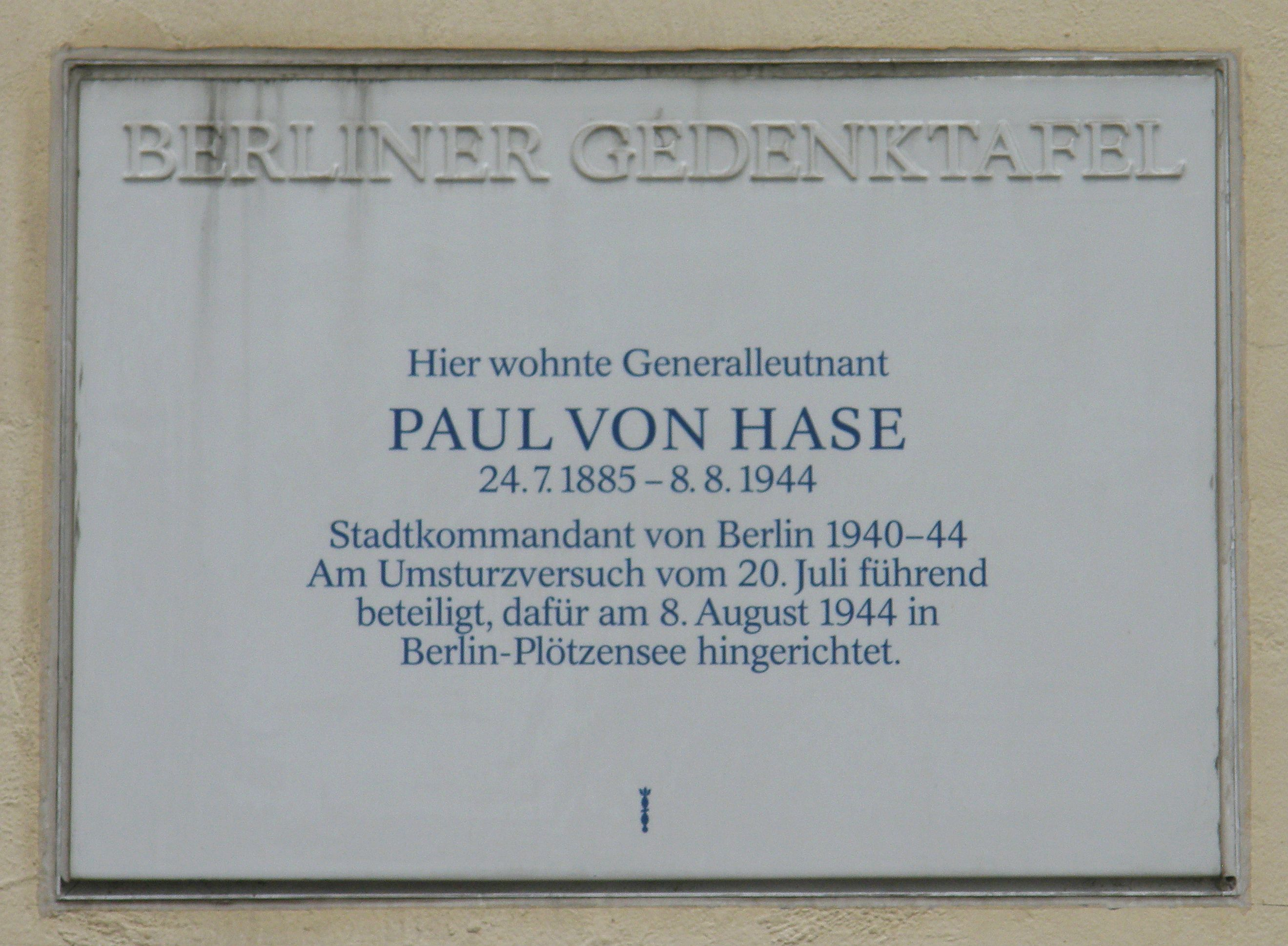
Memorial plaque for Paul von Hase in Berlin

- Imperial Russian Order of Saint Stanislaus, III. Class (RSt3) in 1913
- Iron Cross (1914), 2nd and 1st Class
- Albert Order, Knight's Cross I. Class with Swords
- Hanseatic Cross of Hamburg
- Wound Badge (1918) in Black
- German Reich Sport Badge in Gold in 1931
- The Honour Cross of the World War 1914/1918 with Swords
- Honorary citizen of the city of Pilnikau (Sudetenland) in 1938
- Sudetenland Medal
- Repetition Clasp 1939 to the Iron Cross 1914, 2nd and 1st Class
- War Merit Cross (1939), 2nd and 1st Class with Swords
- German Cross in Silver on 30 December 1943 as Generalleutnant and Commandant of Berlin

== Literature ==
- Roland Kopp, Paul von Hase. Von der Alexander-Kaserne nach Plötzensee. Eine deutsche Soldatenbiographie 1885–1944; Münster – Hamburg – London (LIT) 2001
- Heinrich Bücheler, Paul von Hase. Der Wehrmachtkommandant von Groß-Berlin 1940–1944; in: Damals 7 (Juli 1984), 611 ff.

== See also ==
- List of members of the 20 July plot
- Widerstand

Military offices
Preceded by Generalmajor Karl Kriebel	Commander of 56. Infanterie-Division; July 1940 – November 1940	Succeeded by Generalleutnant Karl von Oven
