= Mart (given name) =

Male given name

- Gender: Male
- Languages: Dutch, Estonian
- Name day: 10 November (Estonia)

Origin
- Region of origin: Netherlands, Estonia

Other names
- Related names: Märt, Marta, Marten, Martin, Martina

Mart is a masculine given name in Dutch, Estonian and less often in English.

People named Mart include:

- Mart Bax (born 1937), Dutch anthropologist
- Mart Bras (born 1950), Dutch water polo player
- Mart Crowley (1935–2020), American playwright
- Mart Dijkstra (born 1990), Dutch footballer
- Mart Duggan (1848–1888), American gunfighter and lawman
- Mart Green, American businessman
- Mart Helme (born 1949), Estonian historian, journalist, diplomat and politician
- Mart Järvik (born 1956), Estonian politician
- Mart Jüssi (born 1965), Estonian ecologist and politician
- Mart Juur (born 1964), Estonian writer, humorist, journalist, music critic, editor and television presenter
- Mart Kadastik (born 1955), Estonian journalist
- Mart Kampus (born 1961), Estonian actor and theatre director
- Mart Kangur (poet) (born 1971), Estonian poet, translator and philosopher
- Mart Kenney (1910–2006), Canadian jazz musician
- Mart Kivastik (born 1963), Estonian film director, screenwriter, playwright and novelist
- Mart Kuusik (1877–1965), Estonian rower
- Mart Laar (born 1960), Estonian politician and historian
- Mart Laga (1936–1977), Estonian basketball player
- Mart Lepp (born 1947), Estonian art collector
- Mart Lieder (born 1990), Dutch footballer
- Mart Markus (born 1990), Estonian speed skater and coach
- Mart McChesney (1954–1999), American actor
- Mart Murdvee (1951–2022), Estonian psychologist and scholar
- Mart Müürisepp (born 1991), Estonian actor
- Mart-Olav Niklus (1934–2025), Estonian ornithologist, dissident, and politician
- Mart Nooij (born 1954), Dutch football manager
- Mart Nutt (born 1962), Estonian politician and historian
- Mart Ojavee (born 1981), Estonian cyclist
- Mart Opmann (born 1956), Estonian politician
- Mart Paama (1938–2006), Estonian track and field athlete
- Mart Poom (born 1972), Estonian football goalkeeper
- Mart Port (1922–2012), Estonian architect
- Mart Raud (1903–1980), Estonian poet, playwright and writer
- Mart Saar (1882–1963), Estonian composer
- Mart Saarma (born 1949), Estonian molecular biologist
- Mart Sander (born 1967), Estonian singer, actor, director, author and television host
- Mart Seim (born 1990), Estonian weightlifter
- Mart Siimann (born 1946), Estonian politician
- Mart Siliksaar (born 1949), Estonian badminton player and coach
- Mart Smeets (born 1947), Dutch journalist
- Mart Stam (1899–1986), Dutch architect and furniture designer
- Mart Taniel (born 1976), Estonian film director, cinematographer and film operator
- Mart Toome (born 1980), Estonian actor
- Mart Ummelas (1953–2020), Estonian journalist
- Mart Ustav (born 1949), Estonian biomedical scientist
- Mart Vilt (1935–2021), Estonian middle-distance runner

== See also ==
- Mart (disambiguation)
- Märt
