= Mart =

Mart may refer to:

- Mart, or marketplace, a location where people regularly gather for the purchase and sale of provisions, livestock, and other goods
- Mart (broadcaster), a local broadcasting station in Amsterdam
- Mart (given name)
- Mart., taxonomic author abbreviation for Carl Friedrich Philipp von Martius (1794–1868), German botanist
- Mart (Syriac), Syriac title for women saints
- Mart, Texas, a community in the United States
- Data mart, an approach to handling big data

== Abbreviations ==
- Museum of Modern and Contemporary Art of Trento and Rovereto, a museum in Italy
- Mississippi Aerial River Transit, a demolished gondola lift in New Orleans, Louisiana
- Montachusett Regional Transit Authority
- Multiple Additive Regression Trees, a commercial name of gradient boosting

== See also ==
- Märt, Estonian male given name
- Kmart
- Walmart
- Mard (disambiguation)
