= Mared =

Mared may refer to:

- Mared (village), a village in Iran
- Mared Williams, Welsh singer
