= Canal de Berdún =

Municipality in Aragon, Spain

Canal de Berdún (Spanish) A Canal de Berdún (Aragonese)
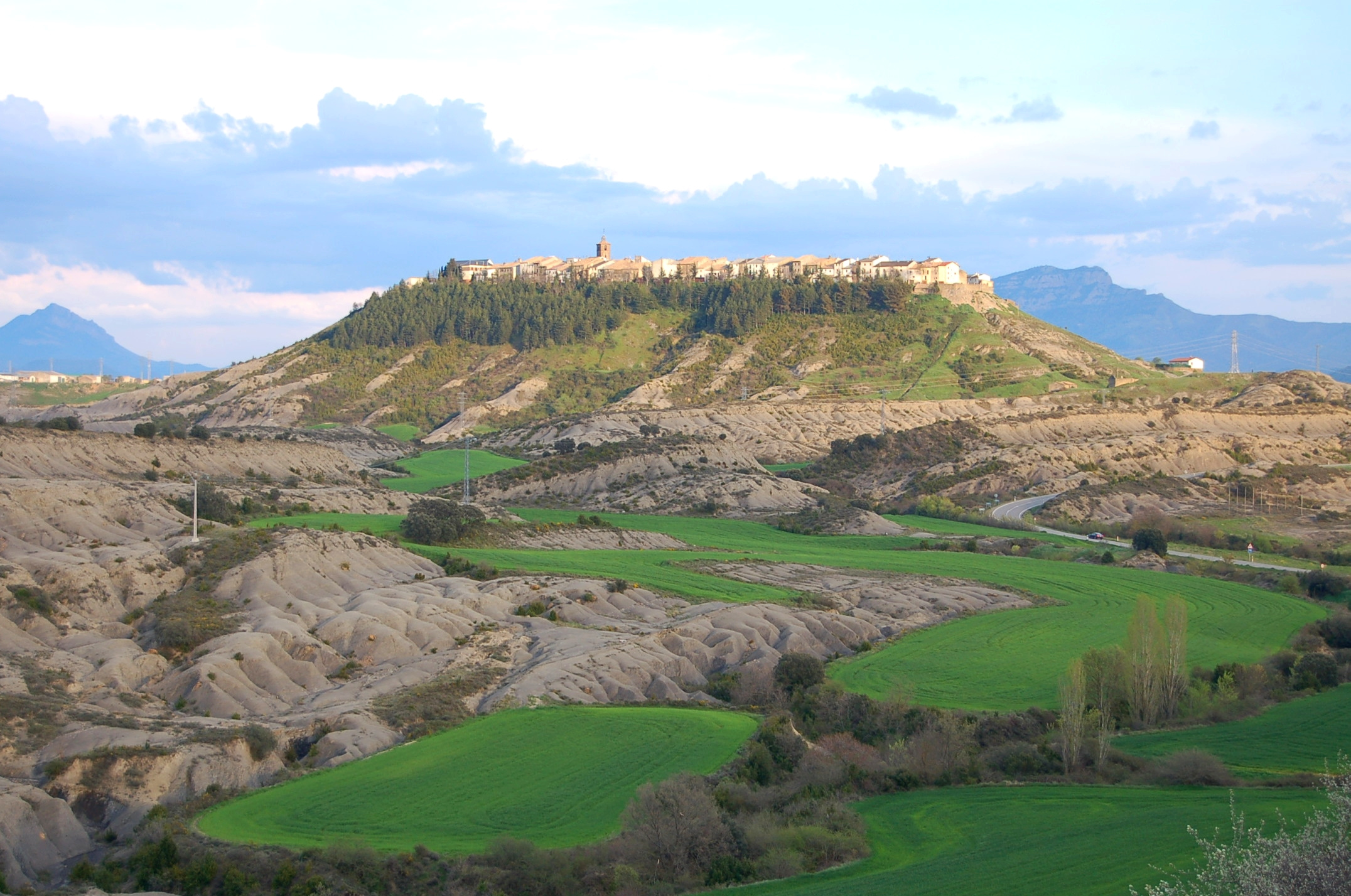
- Berdún on a hilltop

- Location of Canal de Berdún in Aragon
- Coordinates: 42°37′N 0°52′W
- Country: Spain
- Autonomous community: Aragon
- Province: Huesca
- Municipality: Canal de Berdún

Area
  - Total: 133 km^{2} (51 sq mi)
- Elevation: 688 m (2,257 ft)

Population (2025-01-01)
  - Total: 322
  - Density: 2.42/km^{2} (6.27/sq mi)
- Time zone: UTC+1 (CET)
  - Summer (DST): UTC+2 (CEST)

Canal de Berdún (in Aragonese: A Canal de Berdún) is a municipality located in the province of Huesca, Aragon, Spain. According to the 2004 census (INE), the municipality had a population of 401 inhabitants, which had dropped to 321 by 2018.

== Villages ==
- Berdún, the capital of the municipality
- Biniés
- Huértalo
- Majones
- Martes
- Villarreal de la Canal

== See also ==
- List of municipalities in Huesca
