= Mardana =

Mardana can refer to

- Bhai Mardana, one of the first Sikhs and companion of Guru Nanak
- Mardana, Madhya Pradesh, a village in India
- Mardana, the outer part (for guests and men) of a South Asian house, as opposed to the Zenana

== See also ==
- Mardan (disambiguation)
- Mard (disambiguation)
- Mardani, a surname
- Mardaani, 2014 Indian feminist film by Pradeep Sarkar
  - Mardaani 2, 2019 Indian film directed by Gopi Puthran
- Mardani Jhumair, folk dance from the Chota Nagpur Plateau in India
- Mardani khel, Indian martial art from Maharashtra
- Laado 2 – Veerpur Ki Mardani, Indian television series
