= Marte (surname) =

Marte is a Spanish surname particularly common in the Dominican Republic. It is spelled the same as the planet Mars in Spanish, and does not have an accent é. Notable persons with that name include:

- Alfonso Marte (born 1992), Dominican footballer
- Alfredo Marte (born 1989), Dominican baseball player
- Andy Marte (1983–2017), Dominican baseball player
- Dámaso Marte (born 1975), Dominican baseball player
- Domenic Marte, American singer
- Jonathan de Marte (born 1993), Israeli-American baseball pitcher
- José Marte (born 1996), Dominican baseball player
- Karen Marte, American slalom canoeist
- Ketel Marte (born 1993), Dominican baseball player
- Luis Marte (born 1986), American baseball player
- María Marte (born 1978), Dominican chef
- Noelvi Marte (born 2001), Dominican baseball player
- Starling Marte (born 1988), Dominican baseball player
- Víctor Marte (born 1980), Dominican baseball player
- Yunior Marte (born 1995), Dominican baseball player

Those with the surname Marté (with the accent é) include:

- Daouda Marté (born 1959), Nigerien politician
- Jefry Marté (born 1991), Dominican baseball player

== See also ==
- Martí, a similar Spanish surname
