= SC Idar-Oberstein =

German football club

- Full name: Sportclub 07 Idar-Oberstein e. V.
- Nickname: Schmuckstädter (Jewelry City Dwellers)
- Founded: 1907
- Ground: Stadion Im Haag
- Capacity: 6,000
- Manager: Michael Dusek
- League: Verbandsliga Südwest (VI)
- 2025–26: Oberliga Rheinland-Pfalz/Saar (V), 17th of 18 (relegated)
| Home colours | Away colours |

SC Idar-Oberstein is a German association football club from the town of Idar-Oberstein, Rhineland-Palatinate. The club was created in 1971 out of the merger of 1. FC Idar, established 1 January 1907 as SC Alemannia Idar, and Sportvereinigung Idar, formed in 1908. The club currently has departments for football, athletics, and women's gymnastics, as well as youth football and recreational sport.

== History ==
The first football club organized in the Nahe region, 1. FC Idar was a moderately successful amateur side in the years leading up to and following World War II, playing in the highest level regional amateur league through the 20s and into the early 30s, the Kreisliga Saar, later the Bezirksliga Rhein-Saar, and then, for a season, the Gauliga Mittelrhein. In 1938 a trio of FC players joined Hannover 96 and helped that club win the national championship. Following the war FC joined the 2nd Oberliga Südwest (II) where they competed briefly until being sent down in 1954. SpVgg Idar remained a lower tier local club during this time.

Despite the 1971 merger, newly formed SC performed poorly through the rest of the decade and on into the late 80s. An effort by a group of former players revitalized the club and a series of division championships led Idar out of the Bezirksliga Nahe (VII), through the Landesliga Südwest-West (VI) and Verbandsliga Südwest (V), and on to the Oberliga Südwest (IV). The team captured the SWFV-Pokal (Southwest Cup) in 1998, and in 1999 made its first appearance in DFB-Pokal (German Cup) play. They also won their way to the third division Regionalliga West/Südwest that year, but were overmatched and quickly relegated, dropping as far down as the Verbandsliga Südwest again by 2005. The team recovered and climbed the ranks again after this low point and, for the 2011–12 season, the club moved to the Regionalliga West where it stayed until 2012 when it became part of the new Regionalliga Südwest. The club lasted for only one season at this level before being relegated back to the Oberliga, now the Oberliga Rheinland-Pfalz/Saar. After two seasons at Oberliga level the club suffered another relegation in 2015, now to the Verbandsliga.

== Honours ==
The club's honours:

=== League ===
- Oberliga Südwest (IV-V)
  - Champions: 1999, 2011
- Verbandsliga Südwest (V)
  - Champions: 1995, 2007
- Landesliga Südwest-West (VI)
  - Champions: 1994
- Bezirksliga Nahe (VII)
  - Champions: 1992

=== Cup ===
- South West Cup
  - Winners: 1998

== Recent managers ==
Recent managers of the club:

| Manager | Start | Finish |
|---|---|---|
| Patric Muders | 1 July 2007 | 9 September 2007 |
| Michael Dusek | 10 September 2007 | 30 June 2011 |
| Sascha Hildmann | 1 July 2011 | 30 June 2013 |
| Olaf Marschall | 1 July 2013 | 29 August 2014 |
| Christoph Schunck | 29 August 2014 | 5 September 2014 |
| Murat Yasar | 5 September 2014 | 5 November 2018 |
| Uwe Hartenberger | 5 November 2018 | 30 June 2020 |
| Andy Baumgartner | 1 July 2020 | 11 April 2023 |
| Christian Henn | 11 April 2023 | 30 June 2023 |
| Tomasz Kakalla | 1 July 2023 | Present |

== Recent seasons ==
The recent season-by-season performance of the club:

| Season | Division | Tier | Position |
|---|---|---|---|
| 1999–2000 | Regionalliga West/Südwest | III | 18th ↓ |
| 2000–01 | Oberliga Südwest | IV | 14th |
| 2001–02 | Oberliga Südwest | IV | 4th |
| 2002–03 | Oberliga Südwest | IV | 4th |
| 2003–04 | Oberliga Südwest | IV | 15th |
| 2004–05 | Oberliga Südwest | IV | 17th ↓ |
| 2005–06 | Verbandsliga Südwest | V | 2nd |
| 2006–07 | Verbandsliga Südwest | V | 1st ↑ |
| 2007–08 | Oberliga Südwest | IV | 11th |
| 2008–09 | Oberliga Südwest | V | 5th |
| 2009–10 | Oberliga Südwest | V | 4th |
| 2010–11 | Oberliga Südwest | V | 1st ↑ |
| 2011–12 | Regionalliga West | IV | 16th |
| 2012–13 | Regionalliga Südwest | IV | 18th ↓ |
| 2013–14 | Oberliga Rheinland-Pfalz/Saar | V | 6th |
| 2014–15 | Oberliga Rheinland-Pfalz/Saar | V | 14th ↓ |
| 2015–16 | Verbandsliga Südwest | VI | 9th |
| 2016–17 | Verbandsliga Südwest | VI | 2nd ↑ |
| 2017–18 | Oberliga Rheinland-Pfalz/Saar | V | 11th |
| 2018–19 | Oberliga Rheinland-Pfalz/Saar | V | 17th ↓ |
| 2019–20 | Verbandsliga Südwest | VI | 9th |
| 2020–21 | Verbandsliga Südwest | VI | 1st (Season annulled) |
| 2021–22 | Verbandsliga Südwest | VI | 2nd |
| 2022–23 | Verbandsliga Südwest | VI | 4th |
| 2023–24 | Verbandsliga Südwest | VI | 1st ↑ |

- With the introduction of the Regionalligas in 1994 and the 3. Liga in 2008 as the new third tier, below the 2. Bundesliga, all leagues below dropped one tier. In 2012 the Oberliga Südwest was renamed Oberliga Rheinland-Pfalz/Saar.

| ↑ Promoted | ↓ Relegated |

== Stadium ==
Since 1990 SC Idar-Oberstein has played at the Sportgelände Im Haag (capacity 6,000, 400 seats) where they have enjoyed good fan support throughout their years in the Oberliga.

== Current squad ==
As of 2 August 2012

Note: Flags indicate national team as defined under FIFA eligibility rules; some limited exceptions apply. Players may hold more than one non-FIFA nationality.

| No. | Pos. | Nation | Player |
|---|---|---|---|
| 1 | GK | GER | Andreas Forster |
| 2 | DF | GER | Paul Garlinski |
| 3 | DF | GER | Karsten Schug |
| 4 | DF | GER | Christoph Schunck |
| 5 | MF | GER | Michael Lehmann (captain) |
| 6 | MF | GER | Christoph Lawnik |
| 7 | MF | DOM | Alfonso Marte |
| 8 | MF | GER | Christoph Schmell |
| 9 | FW | GER | Patrick Stumpf |
| 10 | DF | GER | Simon Maurer |
| 11 | FW | TUR | Ferhat Gündüz |

| No. | Pos. | Nation | Player |
|---|---|---|---|
| 13 | MF | GER | Florian Cordier |
| 15 | DF | GER | Eugen Vetter |
| 17 | MF | GER | Holger Knartz |
| 18 | MF | AUT | Dino Medjedovic |
| 19 | MF | GER | Jan Stutz |
| 20 | DF | GER | Tim Schwartz |
| 23 | GK | GER | Martin Michel |
| 25 | GK | GER | Nico Adami |
| 26 | MF | GER | Dennis Schröder |
| 27 | DF | GER | Philipp Galle |
| — | MF | USA | Andy Riemer |
