= Biniés =

- Locality
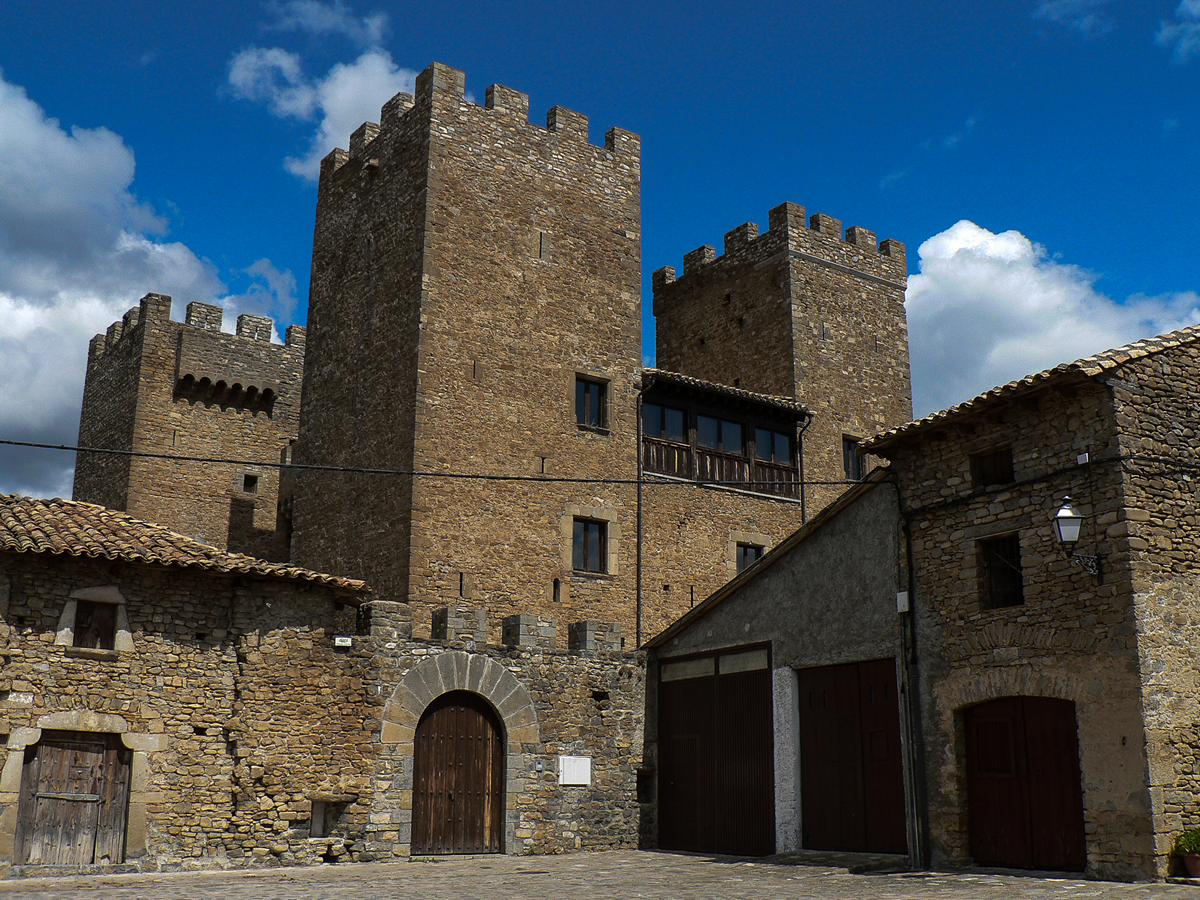

- Location within Aragon Location within Spain
- Coordinates: 42°37′22″N 0°49′2″W
- Country: Spain
- Autonomous community: Aragon
- Province: Province of Huesca
- Municipality: Canal de Berdún
- Elevation: 677 m (2,221 ft)

Population
  - Total: 33

Biniés is a locality located in the municipality of Canal de Berdún, in Huesca province, Aragon, Spain. As of 2020, it has a population of 33.

== Geography ==
Biniés is located 85km north-northwest of Huesca.
