= Märten =

Male given name

- Gender: Male
- Language: Estonian
- Name day: 10 November

Origin
- Region of origin: Estonia

Other names
- Nickname: Märt
- Related names: Martin, Marten, Mart, Martti

Märten is both an Estonian masculine given name and a surname. Märt is often a diminutive of the given name.

As of 1 January 2024, Märten was the 415th most popular male name in Estonia. The name is most commonly found in Saare County, where 6.40 of 10,000 male residents of the county bear the name.

Individuals named Märten include:

- Märten Kuusk (born 1996), Estonian professional footballer
- Märten Metsaviir (born 1994), Estonian actor
- Märten Ross (born 1971), Estonian economist and state official
- Lu Märten (1879–1970), German writer, art critic, socialist theorist and women's rights activist
