= Şerif Mardin =

Turkish academic and sociologist (1927–2017)

- Born: Ahmed Halil Şerif Arif Mardin; 1927; Istanbul, Turkey
- Died: 6 September 2017 (aged 90); Istanbul, Turkey
- Education: Stanford University (BA, PhD); Johns Hopkins University (MA)
- Known for: Sociology of religion (Islam, in particular); Fundamentalism; Political sociology; Historical sociology of the Ottoman Empire; Intellectual history of the Ottoman Empire
- Scientific career
- Fields: Sociology and political science
- Workplaces: Ankara University; Harvard University; Middle East Technical University; Boğaziçi University; Sabancı University; Istanbul Şehir University

Şerif Mardin (1927 – 6 September 2017) was a prominent Turkish sociologist, political scientist, academic and thinker. In a 2008 publication, he was referred to as the "doyen of Turkish sociology."

== Early life and education ==
He was born in Istanbul in 1927 as Ahmed Halil Şerif Arif Mardin. His father was Şemsettin Mardin, a Turkish ambassador. Şemsettin Mardin was a member of very long-established family and was uncle to Arif Mardin and Betul Mardin. Şerif Mardin's mother was Reya Mardin who was the daughter of Ahmet Cevdet, the founder of an Ottoman newspaper called İkdam. His ancestors claim direct lineage from Husain, Muhammad's grandson.

Mardin attended Galatasaray High School, but completed his high school education in the US in 1944. He obtained a degree in political sciences at Stanford University in 1948. Then he received his MA degree in international relations from Johns Hopkins University in 1950. He completed his PhD studies in political science at Stanford University in 1958, and his PhD dissertation was published by Princeton University Press with the title of The Genesis of Young Ottoman Thought in 1962.

== Career ==
Mardin began his academic career at the Faculty of Political Science, Ankara University in 1954, where he worked until 1956. He served as the general secretary of a newly founded political party, Liberty Party, in the period 1956–1957. During this period, he published articles in the Forum magazine.

Then, Mardin worked as a research associate at the Department of Oriental Studies of Princeton University from 1958 to 1961. He worked as a research fellow at the Middle East Institute of Harvard University for one year (1960-1961). He returned to Turkey and joined the Faculty of Political Science of Ankara University in 1961. He became an associate professor in 1964 and a professor in 1969. His academic studies at Ankara University continued until 1973. He also taught courses at the Middle East Technical University in Ankara from 1967 to 1969. Then he worked at the Department of Political Science of Boğaziçi University from 1973 to 1991. During his term at Boğaziçi University, he established the Interdisciplinary Division of the Social Sciences Institute, where young scholars from different disciplines have been carrying out research in the fields of sociology, political science and psychology. Next, Mardin joined Sabancı University in 1999, where he contributed to the establishment of the Faculty of Arts and Social Sciences. He was a faculty member at Istanbul Şehir University for four years until 2017.

In addition to these academic posts, Mardin also worked as a visiting professor at different universities, including Columbia University, Princeton University, University of California, Los Angeles, University of California, Berkeley, Oxford University, Ecoles des Hautes Etudes en Sciences Sociales and Syracuse University.

== Views ==
Focusing on the Ottoman Empire, Mardin developed many hypotheses about the societal structure of Ottomans. For instance, he argued that in the Ottoman Empire, there was no 'civil society' in the Hegelian terms that could operate independently of central government and was based on property rights. Therefore, the lack of civil society led to a difference in the social evolution and political culture in Ottoman society in contrast to Western societies. Mardin applied the terms center and periphery to the Ottoman society, and concluded that the society consisted of city dwellers, including the Sultan, his officials and nomads. In his view, the centre included city dwellers, and the periphery nomads. The integration of center and periphery was not achieved. These two societal characteristics, namely the existence of centre and periphery, and the lack of successful integration of them, also existed in the modern Turkish society, which remained to be the major duality in Turkey. Mardin also emphasized the importance of Jon Turks' thought, addressing the attention of the English-speaking world. Mardin also analyzed the thought of Said Nursi, who was part of this movement in the early years of his life.

Instead of following mainstream accounts of the modernization process in Turkey, Mardin adopted an alternative approach in this regard claiming that Turkish modernization is multi-dimensional. Therefore, reductionism in the form of binary accounts that were resulted from Kemalism cannot provide a satisfactory analysis of Turkish modernism. On the other hand, Mardin maintained that the gap between center and periphery continued during the process of Turkish modernization. Mardin also critically assessed Kemalism and concluded that it has been unsuccessful. But, the reason for Kemalism's underachievement is not related to the fact that it has been insensitive to popularly held beliefs. Instead, Kemalism cannot be sufficiently linked to the heritage of Enlightenment. In short, Kemalism could not develop texts and philosophy of ethics to describe itself and to pass over next generations.

Mardin coined the concept of "Turkish Exceptionalism" to reveal the reasons for the Turks in dealing with Islam and their vision of the state in a different fashion in contrast to other Muslim countries. Mardin objected the idea that the separation between religion and the state in Turkey was a product of Mustafa Kemal Atatürk's movement. Instead, he argued that this separation began during the Ottoman period. Concerning secularism, Mardin also posited a view that reflects the exceptional use of the term in Turkey. He stated that secularism in Turkey does not refer to a hostile state approach towards religion. Instead, secularism for Turks means that the state comes before religion by just “one millimetre”.

Mardin asserted that religion, Islam in this context, and its representatives, including clerics, function as a mediator between the individual and the state. Islam was also a unifying code for those in the periphery during the late period of the Ottoman Empire. For Mardin, Kemalism and Islam were not rival ideologies.

In 2007, Mardin coined the term “community pressure” (Turkish: Mahalle baskısı) to describe a sociological reality that has been experienced in the secular Turkish society as a result of the rise of Islamic lifestyle in the country. He argued that the Naqshbandi order was "an extraordinarily resilient revivalist movement, in which all of the successful elements of modern Turkish Islamic politics have originated."

== Personal life and death ==
Şerif Mardin married twice and had a son, Osman Mardin, from his first marriage.

Mardin died in a hospital in Istanbul on 6 September 2017 at the age of 90. Funeral ceremony for him was on the next day in Istanbul, and several politicians, including Ahmet Davutoğlu and Ertuğrul Günay attended the funeral prayers in Sarıyer's Yeniköy mosque.

== Works ==
=== Books ===
Mardin published many books on religion, modernization, and society in the context of Turkey, and some of them are given as follows:

- Religion and Social Change in Modern Turkey: The Case of Bediuzzaman Said Nursi, Albany, NY: State University of New York Press, 1989
- The Genesis of Young Ottoman Thought: A Study in the Modernization of Turkish Political Ideas, Syracuse, NY: Syracuse University Press, July 2000
- Laicism in Turkey, İstanbul: Konrad Adenauer Foundation Press, March 2003
- Center and periphery in the Ottoman Empire, New York: Syracuse University Press 2005
- The nature of nation in the late Ottoman Empire, Leiden: ISIM 2005
- Religion, society, and modernity in Turkey, Syracuse, NY: Syracuse University Press, July 2006

=== Membership ===
Mardin was a member of the Turkish Social Science Association, which carried out a research project in İzmir in the early 1970s. The project was funded by the Ford Foundation.
