= Ansó =

Coordinates: 42°45′N 0°49′W

Ansó, Spain
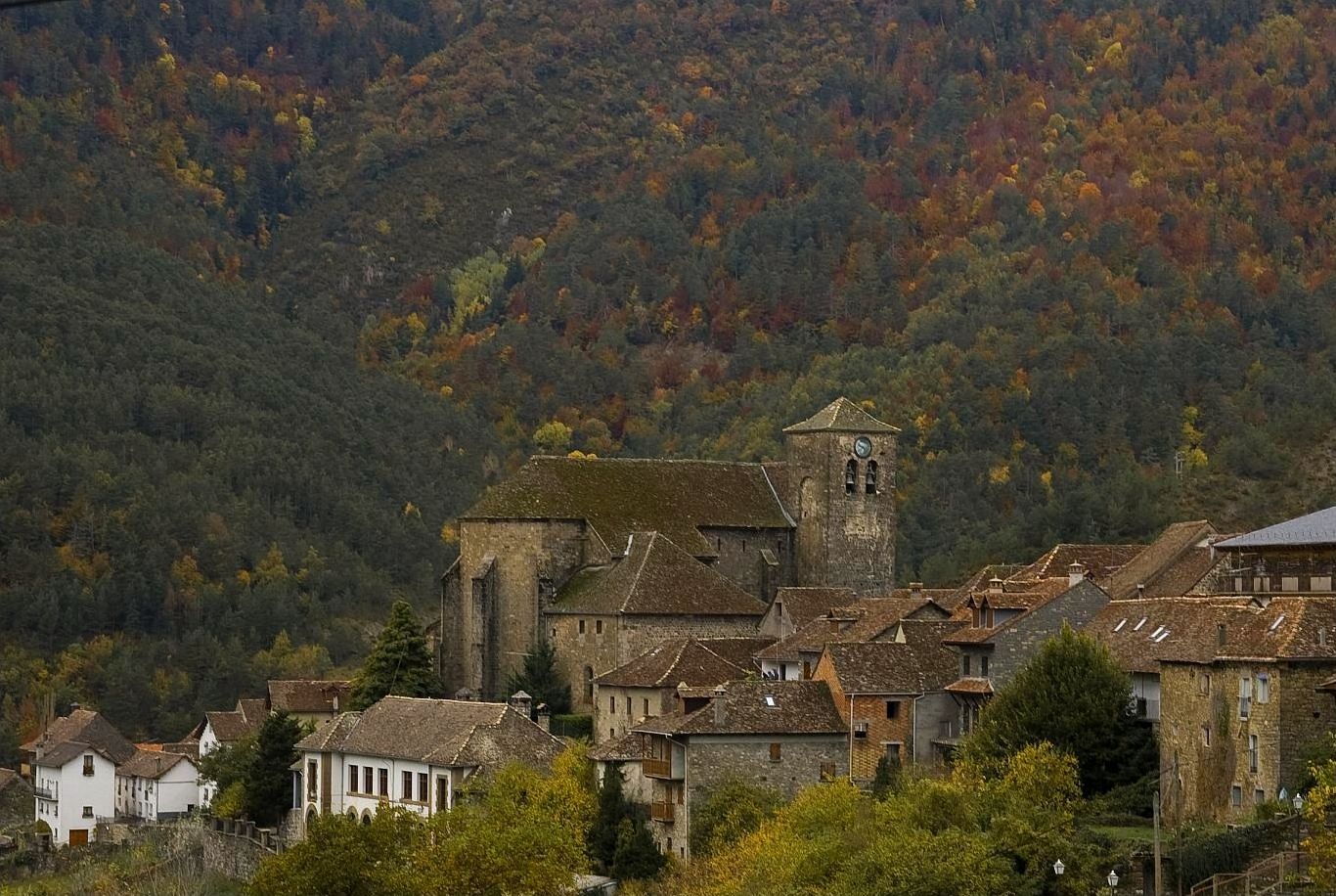
- Anso

- Coat of arms
- Interactive map of Ansó, Spain
- Country: Spain
- Autonomous community: Aragon
- Province: Huesca
- Municipality: Ansó

Area
  - Total: 224 km^{2} (86 sq mi)

Population (2025-01-01)
  - Total: 409
  - Density: 1.83/km^{2} (4.73/sq mi)
- Time zone: UTC+1 (CET)
  - Summer (DST): UTC+2 (CEST)

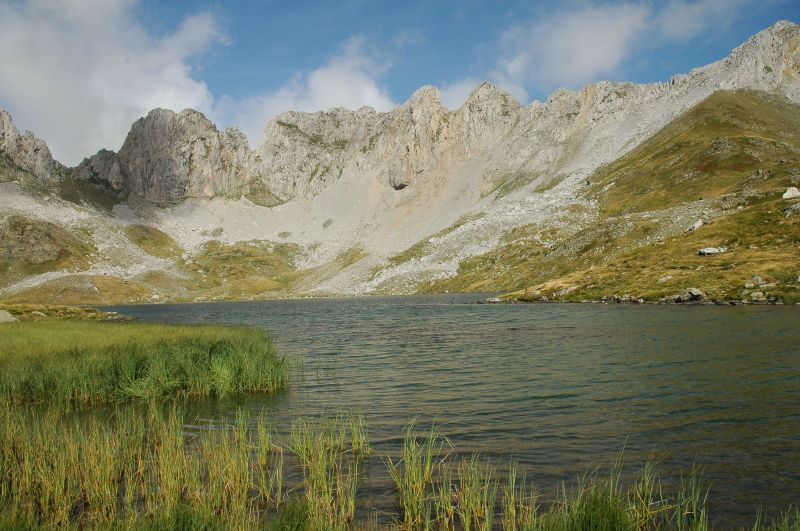
Ibón de l'Acherito

Ansó is a town and municipality located in the province of Huesca, Aragon, Spain. According to the 2004 census (INE), the municipality had a population of 523 inhabitants. The municipality includes the towns of Ansó and Fago (7 km. apart).

The municipality includes the whole valle de Ansó in the Pyrenees. Ansó is on the left side of the Veral river, which descends from mountains that are more than 2,000 metres high.

== See also ==
- List of municipalities in Huesca
