= Majones =

- Locality
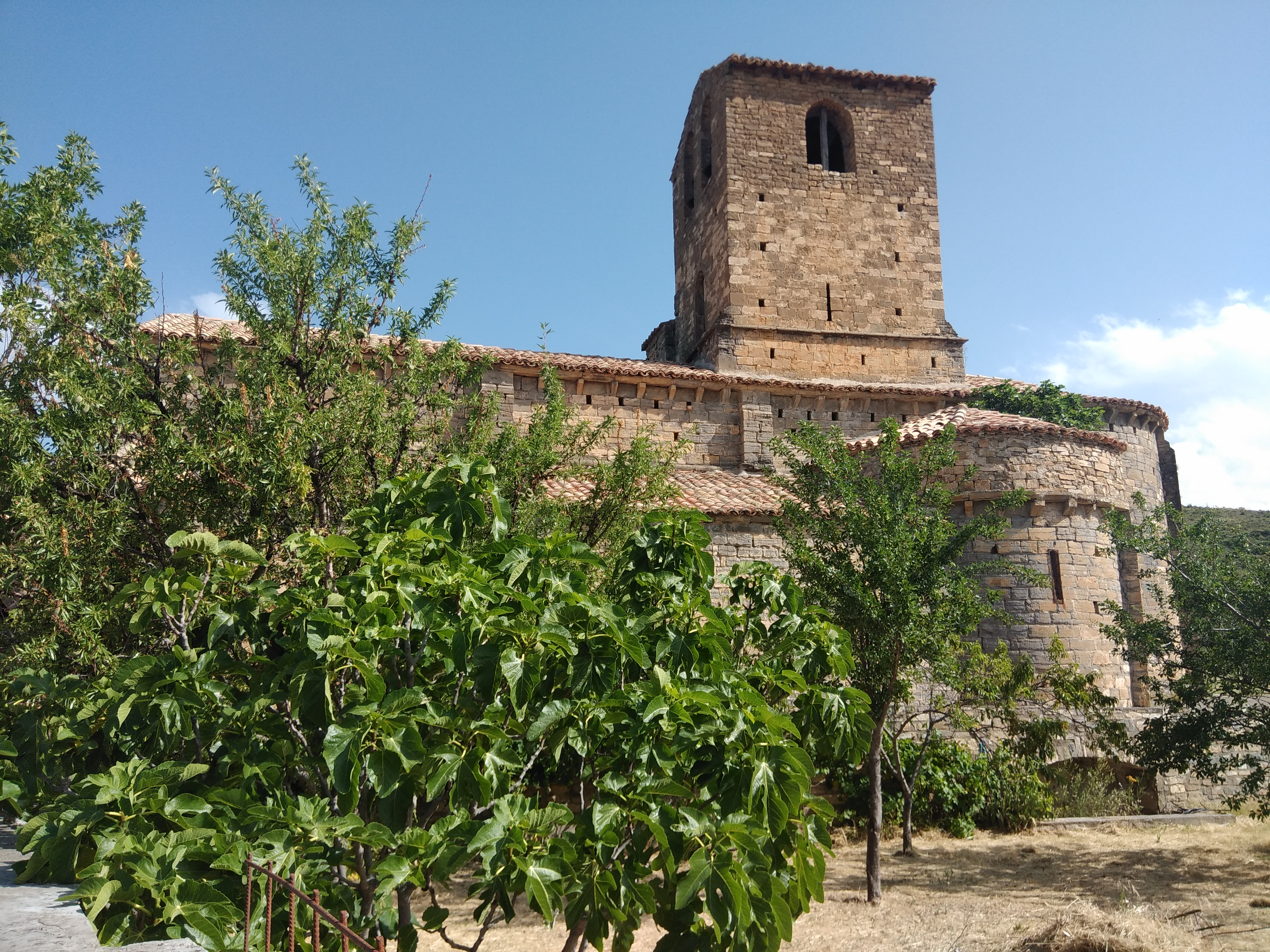

- Location within Aragon Location within Spain
- Coordinates: 42°39′27″N 0°52′26″W
- Country: Spain
- Autonomous community: Aragon
- Province: Province of Huesca
- Municipality: Canal de Berdún
- Elevation: 658 m (2,159 ft)

Population
  - Total: 9

Majones is a locality located in the municipality of Canal de Berdún, in Huesca province, Aragon, Spain. As of 2020, it has a population of 9.

== Geography ==
Majones is located 92km north-northwest of Huesca.
