= Karl Holzamer =

Former director general of ZDF (1906–2007)

- Born: October 13, 1906; Frankfurt, Grand Duchy of Hesse and by Rhine, German Empire
- Died: April 22, 2007 (aged 100); Mainz, Germany
- Occupation: Former director general of ZDF

Johannes Karl Holzamer (October 13, 1906 – April 22, 2007) was a German philosopher, pedagogue and former director general of the German television station ZDF.

== Life ==
Karl Holzamer was born in Frankfurt am Main and after the abitur in 1926 studied philosophy, pedagogy, psychology, and German at the Ludwig-Maximilians-Universität München (LMU), the Sorbonne, the Goethe University Frankfurt, and the University of Bonn. In 1929, he was awarded his Ph.D. from Munich. After university, he applied to the Pedagogic Academy in Bonn and did his First Examination as a Volksschullehrer. His reason for becoming a teacher was, according to him: "If you want to educate as a Volksschule teacher, then you have to go to Volksschule yourself."

In 1931, Holzamer was co-publisher of the magazine "Stimmen der Jugend" ("Voices of Youth") in Düsseldorf. Within a short time, he became an assistant at the Psychological Institute of the University of Bonn and in November 1931 became assistant in the psychological department of the Westdeutscher Rundfunk. In politics, he got involved in the "Reichsjugendausschuss" (Council of the Youth in the Reich) of the Zentrumspartei. Parallel to his occupations, an application to become a professor was started.

=== Third Reich ===
After the Machtergreifung, Holzamer had to end his political engagement. At his broadcaster, his boss and the director general were laid-off, so he had to lead the educational department on his own, then the agricultural department (without proper experience) because of no party membership to the NSDAP, the language department and confessional morning celebrations (CMC). The last post (CMC) existed still in 1937 at the previously-renamed "Reichsender Köln" despite an order not to have such a department. At the beginning of World War II, Holzamer was drafted into the army. He came as an air-gunner into the Luftwaffe (Air Force) and became war reporter for audio news. At the end of WW II, he was a prisoner-of-war of the French, where he worked as a translator.

=== Educational life ===
Karl Holzamer handed in his application as professor at the Prussian Cultural Ministry ( under the direction of Adolf Grimme. The professorship expired in 1937, but despite there being vacancies, he wasn't allocated to the university service. After World War II, with his good certificates from various high-level universities, the American occupation force facilitated him in 1946 to a professorship in philosophy, psychology and pedagogy at the Johannes Gutenberg University of Mainz. In 1952 he was appointed professor ordinarius. In 1948, he got professorship for scholastic philosophy and pedagogy. As a representative of the University of Mainz, he got into the television council of the Südwestfunk Baden-Baden (precursor of the Südwestrundfunk). Because Holzamer was the only one of 49 people with practical experience, he was from 1949 to 1960 the chairman.

=== ZDF ===
Karl Holzamer was recommended by then-Chancellor Konrad Adenauer in 1960 as director general of the proposed private television "Freies Fernsehen Gesellschaft" (FFG). The board of directors rejected the recommendation. As a CDU candidate - where he had the overwhelming approval of the rival SPD -he was elected director general by the television council of the ZDF, the successor of the FFG. He was re-elected twice. In 1977, he retired. His successor in the post was Karl-Günther von Hase.

Wim Thoelke, a prominent former television host, said of the time of Holzamer at the ZDF: "Karl Holzamer was a man of vitalizing optimism, as well as highly intelligent and critical in a positive kind of manner. Without him, it would be impossible for the ZDF to be successful."

Holzamer co-created the Aktion Sorgenkind, a German humanitarian organization (renamed to Aktion Mensch), by extending its cause well beyond the television show Vergißmeinnicht (Forget-me-not). Holzamer was an honorary member of club KStV Kurpfalz Mainz im KV.

=== Private life ===
Karl Holzamer married in 1932 his fiancé Helene, with whom he had four children. Helene died in 1992.

== Awards and honorations ==
- Bundesverdienstkreuz
- Großkreuz des päpstlichen Gregoriusordens
- Hans-Bredow-Medal
- Hans-Bausch-Media Award
- 1980 Adolf Grimme Award
- 1982 Order of Merit of Rhineland-Palatinate
- 1983 Honorary Citizen of the City of Mainz
- 1983 Eduard Rhein Ring of Honor from the Eduard Rhein Foundation
- 2003 Premio Capo Circeo

== Works ==
- Grundfragen des neuzeitlichen Humanismus, Kupferberg, Mainz 1947. (= Mainzer Universitäts-Reden; H. 4)
- Einführung in die Philosophie. Grundlegung der Erkenntnis-Theorie als Fundament der übrigen Disziplinen, Kupferberg, Mainz 1947.
- Einführung in die Pädagogik, Kirchheim, Mainz 1949.
- Grundriss einer praktischen Philosophie: Freiheit, Toleranz, Sittlichkeit, Ressentiment, Knecht, Frankfurt am Main 1951.
- Kind und Radio, Klett-Verlag, Stuttgart 1954. (= Bedrohte Jugend – drohende Jugend; 34)
- Die Einführung junger Menschen in die soziale Verantwortung. Ein Vortrag, Frankfurt am Main 1959. (= Schriften des Deutschen Paritätischen Wohlfahrtsverbandes; 19)
- Authoritarismus und Nationalismus. Ein deutsches Problem? Bericht über eine Tagung, Europäische Verlagsanstalt, Frankfurt am Main 1963. (= Politische Psychologie; 2)
- Die Verantwortung des Menschen für sich und seinesgleichen. Reden und Aufsätze, Bertelsmann-Verlag Gütersloh 1966.
- Kunst und Konfektion im Bereich der Publizistik, Versuch eines Brückenschlags, Sebaldus, Nürnberg 1969.
- Projekte, Probleme und Perspektiven des Fernstudiums im Medienverbund, Athenaeum, Frankfurt am Main 1970. (= Lehren und lernen im Medienverbund; 1) ISBN 3-494-00635-0
- Das Wagnis. Zum Sehen geboren, zum Schauen bestellt, von Hase u. Koehler, Mainz 1979 ISBN 3-7758-0980-5
- Anders, als ich dachte. Lebenserinnerungen des ersten ZDF-Intendanten, Herder, Freiburg im Breisgau u.a. 1983. (= Herderbücherei; 1066) ISBN 3-451-08066-4
- Einführung in die Welt des Denkens, Pattloch-Verlag 1990, ISBN 3-629-00548-9

== Sources ==
- Reden zur Verabschiedung von Professor Dr. Karl Holzamer und zur Einführung des Intendanten Karl-Günther von Hase, ZDF Mainz 1977.
