= Karl-Günther von Hase =

German diplomat (1917–2021)

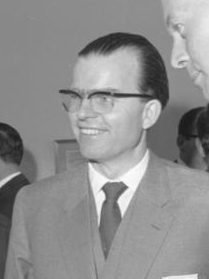
- Hase in 1964

German Ambassador to the United Kingdom
- In office 1970–1977
- Preceded by: Herbert Blankenhorn
- Succeeded by: Hans Hellmuth Ruete

Personal details
- Born: 15 December 1917 Gut Wangern, Breslau, Silesia, Prussia, German Empire
- Died: 9 May 2021 (aged 103)
- Party: CDU
- Relations: Karl Hase (great-grandfather); Paul von Hase (uncle); Dietrich Bonhoeffer (cousin)
- Awards: Grand Decoration of Austria; Knight's Cross of the Iron Cross; Order of Merit of the Federal Republic of Germany; Honorary Knight Grand Cross of the Royal Victorian Order; Honorary Knight Commander of the Order of St Michael and St George

Military service
- Allegiance: Nazi Germany
- Branch/service: German Army
- Years of service: 1936–1945
- Rank: Major
- Unit: 20th Panzer Division
- Battles/wars: World War II

Karl-Günther von Hase (15 December 1917 – 9 May 2021) was a German diplomat and Secretary of state. As head of the Press and Information Office of the Federal Government, he served as spokesman of government under three chancellors. He was ambassador to the United Kingdom from 1970 to 1977. He was then Director General of the ZDF, a German public-service television broadcaster, retiring in 1982.

== Life ==
Hase was born in Gut Wangern, Breslau, Silesia, Prussia, Germany (now Gmina Żórawina, Poland). His father, Günther von Hase (1881–1948) was a Prussian major and a police officer from 1920 to 1934, ending his career as a Oberst der Landespolizei and Stabschef in Berlin. His mother was Ina von Hase née Hicketier (1882–1972). He attended the humanistic Prinz-Heinrichs-Gymnasium in Berlin, completing with the Abitur in 1935. He entered a military career as a Fahnenjunker of the Artillerieregiment 19 Hannover / Celle, studying at the Kriegsschule Potsdam in 1936/37.

Hase served in the Wehrmacht in World War II on fronts in Poland, France, Russia (where he was wounded in 1942), and Italy. He was a major in the Generalstab. After his uncle Paul von Hase participated in the 20 July plot and was executed, he was dismissed from the Generalstab and sent to Schneidemühl, now in Poland. Hase married Renate Stumpff, the daughter of Generaloberst Hans-Jürgen Stumpff, on 13 February 1945 in a Ferntrauung (a wartime remote wedding), and they later had five daughters. He was a prisoner of war in Russia, returning in 1949.

Hase attended a school for diplomats in Speyer in 1951, which at the time accepted students without a university background. Hase had his first job in the Foreign Office in 1952. In 1958, he became director of its press department, a secretary of state function. From 1961, he was head of the department West II, responsible for the NATO, defense, Great Britain, U.S., Central America and South America, and Africa south of the Sahara.

Hase became director of the press and information office of the Federal Government (Presse- und Informationsamt der Bundesregierung) in 1962, serving as spokesman of the federal government (Regierungssprecher) under chancellors Adenauer, Erhard and Kiesinger. In 1967, he was elected as Intendant of the broadcaster Deutsche Welle, but he was requested by Kiesinger to not accept the position. Instead, he was secretary of state for the Ministry of Defense. In 1969 when a social-liberal coalition ruled, he returned to the foreign office. He served as an ambassador to the United Kingdom from 1970 to 1977.

Hase then became Director General (Intendant) of the ZDF, a German public-service television broadcaster, succeeding its first Intendant, Karl Holzamer. He had little experience with broadcasting, but was a compromise candidate because other candidates could not find a majority; Hase offered diplomatic skills and a vision for the future. He is credited with expanding collaboration with broadcasters internationally during his tenure. Series were begun at the time that have continued to this day, including heute-journal, Wetten, dass..?, and Politbarometer. He promoted technical innovations such as cable television, satellite television, and teletext.

After his retirement, Hase lived with his wife in Bad Godesberg. He was honorary president of the German-English Society, and kept contact with military associations, the foreign office, the ZDF, and the federal press office. Hase turned 100 in December 2017 and died in May 2021 at the age of 103.

== Publications ==
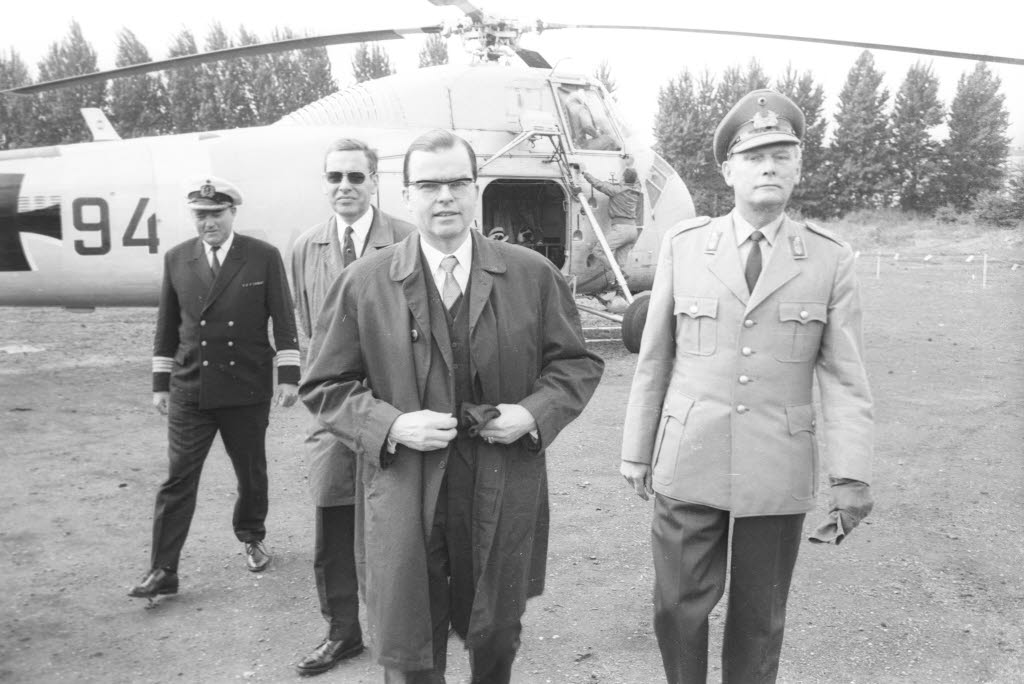
Hase arriving in 1967

Hase's publications, all in German, include:

- Karl-Günther von Hase (1968). Rede anlässlich der Amtseinführung des Bundeswehrdisziplinaranwaltes in München am 23. August 1968 [Speech on the occasion of the inauguration of the Bundeswehr disciplinary attorney in Munich on August 23, 1968]. Bonn: Bundesministerium der Verteidigung. OCLC 255495294.
- ——; Rolf Breitenstein [in German]; George Mikes, eds. (1968). Twinning: deutsch-britische Partnerschaften [Twinning: German-British partnerships]. London: Wolff. OCLC 73784477.
- —— (1979). Hat das Fernsehen eine Zukunft? Probleme u. Perspektiven d. Programmarbeit; Vortrag, gehalten vor Mitgliedern d. Industrie-Clubs Düsseldorf, 4. Oktober 1979 [TDoes television have a future? Problems and perspectives d. Program work; Lecture given to members d. Industrie-Clubs Düsseldorf, October 4, 1979]. Düsseldorf: Düsseldorf Industrie-Club. OCLC 614562740.
- ——, ed. (1988). Konrad Adenauer und die Presse [Konrad Adenauer and the press]. Rhöndorfer Gespräche. Vol. 9. Bonn: Bouvier. ISBN 3-416-02047-2.
- ——; Hans Poeppel; Prince Wilhelm-Karl of Prussia, eds. (2000). Die Soldaten der Wehrmacht. Mit einem Geleitwort von Gerhard Stoltenberg [The soldiers of the Wehrmacht. With a foreword by Gerhard Stoltenberg] (6 ed.). Munich: Herbig. ISBN 3-7766-2057-9.
- ——; Johannes Marré [in German], eds. (2000). Ministerialdirigent a.D. Dr. h.c. Edmund F. (Friedemann) Dräcker. Leben und Werk. Vom kaiserlichen Vizekonsul zum indischen Guru. Eine Dokumentation [Ministerialdirigent a.D. Dr. h.c. Edmund F. (Friedemann) Dräcker. Life and work. From imperial vice consul to Indian guru. A documentation]. Beiträge zur Popularisierung bundesdeutscher Behörden. Reihe A, Das Auswärtige Amt. Band 4d, Herausragende Angehörige des Auswärtigen Dienstes, 2. Lfg. Nomos: Baden-Baden. ISBN 3-7890-6950-7. (Imprint of Wissenschaftliche Verlagsanstalt zur Pflege Deutschen Sinngutes)
- ——; Reinhard Appe, eds. (2001). Preußen 1701/2001 [Prussia 1701/2001]. Cologne: Köln Eco. ISBN 3-934519-80-6.
- —— (2010). Erinnerungen [Memories]. Meckenheim: WDV. ISBN 978-3-930376-71-1.
- —— (2014). "Die Rache des Regimes an der Familie von Hase – der Neffe" [The regime's revenge on the von Hase family - the nephew]. In Friedrich-Wilhelm von Hase [in German] (ed.). Hitlers Rache. Das Stauffenberg-Attentat und seine Folgen für die Familien der Verschwörer [Hitler's revenge. The Stauffenberg assassination attempt and its consequences for the families of the conspirators]. Holzgerlingen: SCM Hänssler. p. 69. ISBN 978-3-7751-5537-3. (part of the Anne Frank Shoah Library)

== Awards ==
- Iron Cross (1939)
  - 2nd Class (28 May 1940)
  - 1st Class (26 June 1940)
- German Cross in Gold on 11 February 1943 as Hauptmann in the 3./Panzer-Artillerie-Regiment 92 (Note: According to Federl on 21 February 1943.)
- Knight's Cross of the Iron Cross on 12 February 1945 as Major and general staff officer with the commander of the fortress Schneidemühl (Ia (operations officer) Panzer-Division "Holstein") (Note: According to Scherzer as Major im Generalstab (in the General Staff) and Ia (operations officer)/commander of the fortress Schneidemühl.)
- Austrian Grand Decoration of Honour in Gold with Star (1964)
- Honorary Knight Commander of the Order of St Michael and St George (1965)
- Orden wider den tierischen Ernst 1967
- Honorary Knight Grand Cross of the Royal Victorian Order (1972)
- Order of Merit of the Federal Republic of Germany 1982
- Honorary doctorate of the University of Manchester, in Law
