= Mardani =

Mardani is a surname. Notable people with the surname include:

- Mehrdad Mardani, Iranian wrestler
- Mohammad Ali Mardani (born 1994), Iranian footballer
- Mohd Mardani (born 1972), Singaporean footballer
- Nasrollah Mardani (1947–2003), Iranian poet
- Sajjad Mardani (born 1986), Iranian taekwondo practitioner
- Mardani Ali Sera (born 1968), Indonesian academic and politician

== Other ==
- Mardan (disambiguation)
- Mardana (disambiguation)
- Mardani Jhumair, folk dance from the Chota Nagpur Plateau in India
- Mardani khel, Indian martial art from Maharashtra
- Laado 2 – Veerpur Ki Mardani, Indian television series
- Mardaani, 2014 Indian film by Pradeep Sarkar
  - Mardaani 2, its 2019 sequel by Gopi Puthran
