= Shir Mard, Chaharmahal and Bakhtiari =

Shir Mard شيرمرد
- Village
- Location within Iran
- Coordinates: 31°24′50″N 51°12′59″E
- Country: Iran
- Province: Chaharmahal and Bakhtiari
- County: Lordegan
- Bakhsh: Falard
- Rural District: Falard

Population (2006)
  - Total: 871
- Time zone: UTC+3:30 (IRST)
  - Summer (DST): UTC+4:30 (IRDT)

Shir Mard (Persian: شيرمرد, also Romanized as Shīr Mard) is a village in Falard Rural District, Falard District, Lordegan County, Chaharmahal and Bakhtiari Province, Iran. At the 2006 census, its population was 871, in 152 families. The village is populated by Lurs.
