= Mardin mine =

Phosphate mine in Mardin, Turkey

- Location within Turkey
- Location: Mardin, Mardin Province, Turkey; 37°30′55.08″N 40°30′5.04″E
- Products: Phosphates
- Opened: 1966
- Company: Etibank

The Mardin mine is a large mine in Mardin Province, in the south-east of Turkey, 743 km south-east of the capital, Ankara. Mardin represents one of the largest phosphates reserves in Turkey having estimated reserves of 200 million tonnes of ore grading 11% P_{2}O_{5}.
