= Mart Jüssi =

Estonian politician

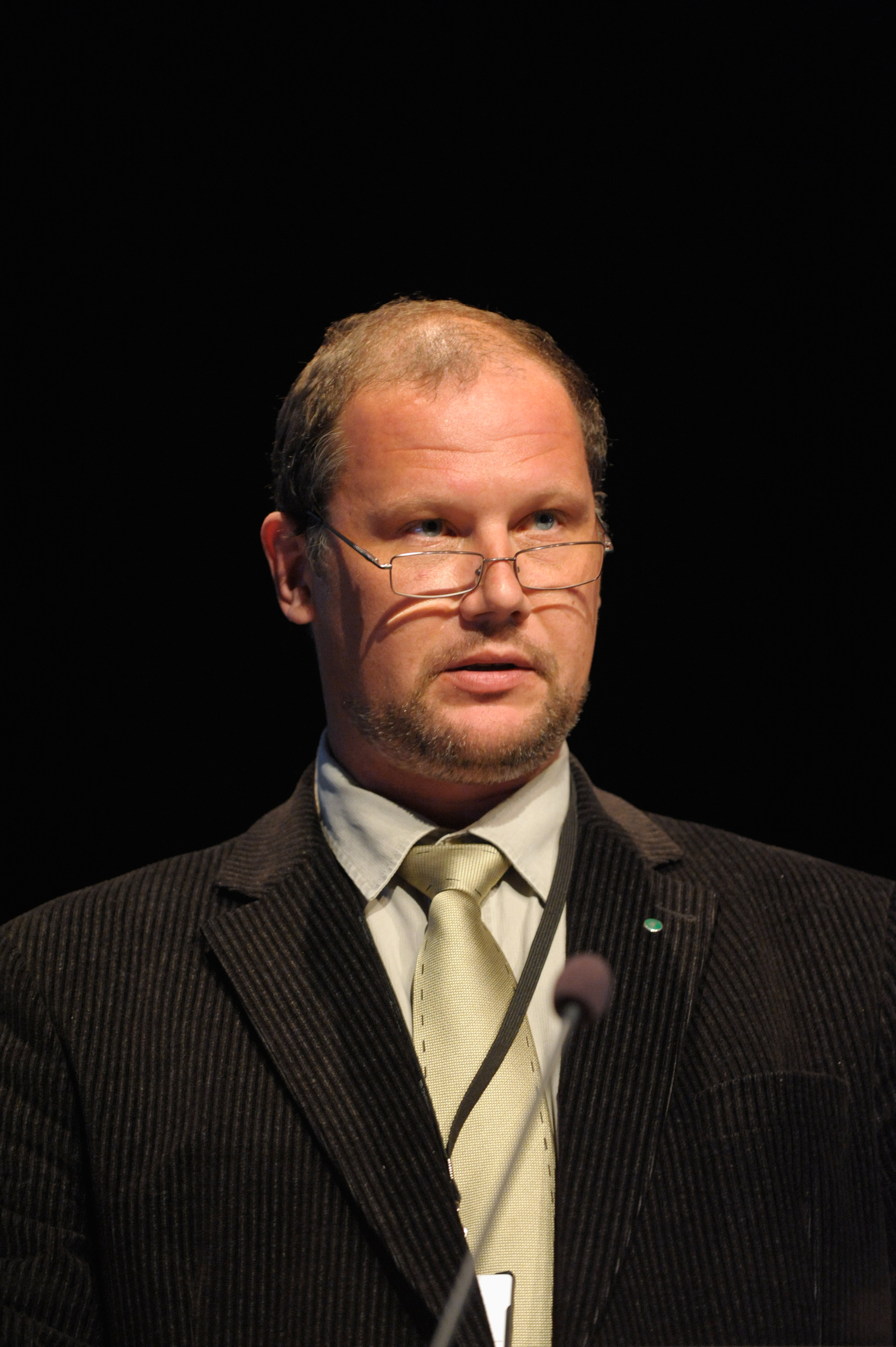
Mart Jüssi in 2008.

Mart Jüssi (born 21 March 1965 in Tallinn) is an Estonian ecologist and politician. He has been member of XI Riigikogu.

His father is biologist, nature writer and photographer Fred Jüssi and his mother is journalist and translator Helju Jüssi. He is a member of the party Estonian Greens.
