= Bomb man of Pae street =

Estonian serial bomber

The Bomb man of Pae street (Estonian: Pae tänava pommimees) was a notorious serial bomber, later identified as Märt Ringmaa (30 May 1938 – 30 June 2021), who was active in Lasnamäe, Tallinn, Estonia. Over ten years, twelve IEDs made by Ringmaa exploded in public places, leading to the death of seven people and injuring six.

On 23 March 2009, Harju County court convicted Ringmaa of unlawful handling of explosive devices and fraud, and sentenced him to 15 years imprisonment, counted since his arrest on 11 November 2005. According to the court's decision, Ringmaa installed an explosive device in a glass bottle buyback kiosk on 15 Punane str., Tallinn, on 11 April 2001; delivered an explosive device to the lobby of 23 Pae str., Tallinn, on 19 November 2003; and presented false information to the Tallinn Office of Pensions Estonian: Tallinna Pensioniamet. Ringmaa was acquitted of other charges. In a related civil suit, Ringmaa was fined 10,000 EEK, ordered to pay 10,000 EEK to partially cover costs of the state-appointed attorney, and ordered to pay 20,255 EEK to cover costs of expert services. The prosecutor had requested life imprisonment for Ringmaa, based on his assessment of Ringmaa's crime spree as constituting one of the deadliest in Estonian history.

== See also ==
- List of serial killers by country
