= Mart Kampus =

Estonian actor and theatre director

Mart Kampus (born 12 December 1961 in Tartu) is an Estonian stage, television and radio actor and theatre director.

From 1985 to 1995 and again from 2000 to 2001 he worked at the Estonian Puppet Theatre. From 1995 to 1997 he worked at the Von Krahl Theatre. Then from 1997 to 2000 he was the head of Tartu Lasteteater. Since 2001, he has been working as a freelancer.

== Director's works ==
- "Ansomardi Jalgsema järv" (1990; also played a role there)
- "Piumini ja Kampuse Seme ja maailm" (1992)
- "Wilde'i Noor kuningas" (1994, Rakvere Theatre)
