= Villarreal de la Canal =

- Locality
- Location within Aragon Location within Spain
- Coordinates: 42°38′24″N 0°53′20″W
- Country: Spain
- Autonomous community: Aragon
- Province: Province of Huesca
- Municipality: Canal de Berdún
- Elevation: 634 m (2,080 ft)

Population
  - Total: 46

Villarreal de la Canal is a locality located in the municipality of Canal de Berdún, in Huesca province, Aragon, Spain. As of 2020, it has a population of 46.

== Geography ==
Villarreal de la Canal is located 89km northwest of Huesca.
