= Martes (Aragón) =

- Locality
- Location within Aragon Location within Spain
- Coordinates: 42°34′21″N 0°53′31″W
- Country: Spain
- Autonomous community: Aragon
- Province: Province of Huesca
- Municipality: Canal de Berdún
- Elevation: 620 m (2,030 ft)

Population
  - Total: 25

Martes is a locality located in the municipality of Canal de Berdún, in Huesca province, Aragon, Spain, 86 km northwest of Huesca. As of 2020, it has a population of 25.
