= Marten (given name) =

Marten is a masculine given name. It may refer to:

== People ==
- Marten von Barnekow (1900–1967), German equestrian
- Marten Beinema (1932–2008), Dutch politician
- Marten Burkens (1934–2022), Dutch legal scholar and politician
- Marten van Cleve (1527–1581), Flemish painter and draftsman
- Marten Cumberland (1892–1972), British journalist, novelist and editor
- Marten Eikelboom (born 1973), Dutch field hockey player
- Marten Gäde (born 1986), German politician
- Marten Gasparini (born 1997), Italian baseball player
- Marten Jozef Geeraerts (1707–1791), Flemish historical painter
- Marten Hartwell (1925–2013), Canadian bush pilot
- Marten Hamkes (c.1550–1620), Dutch Frisian writer, poet and historian
- Marten Heemskerck van der Heck (1620–1660), Dutch painter
- Marten Jacobsz Heemskerk van Veen (1498–1574), Dutch portrait and religious painter
- Marten Hoekstra (born 1961), American CEO of a financial services company
- Marten Joustra, British video game and jazz composer
- Marten Kapewasha (born 1949), Namibian diplomat and politician
- Marten Mendez (1916–1994), American badminton player
- Marten-Chris Paalberg (born 2008), Estonian footballer
- Marten Pepijn (1575–1643), Flemish history and genre painter
- Marten Post (born 1942), Dutch visual artist
- Marten Rijckaert (1587–1631), Flemish landscape painter
- Marten Rudelsheim (1873–1920), Flemish movement activist
- Marten Schagen (1700–1770), Dutch Mennonite bookseller and translator
- Marten Scheffer (born 1958), Dutch ecologist
- Marten Sonk (c.1590–1625), Dutch Governor of Formosa
- Marten Strauch (born 1986), German rugby player
- Marten Douwes Teenstra (1795–1864), Dutch writer and traveller
- Marten Toonder (1912–2005), Dutch comic creator
- Marten van Valckenborch (1535–1612), Flemish Renaissance painter
- Marten van der Veen (born 1946), British Royal Air Force officer
- Marten van Riel (born 1992), Belgian triathlete
- Marten de Vos (1532–1603), Flemish painter and draughtsman
- Marten Waefelaerts (1748–1799), Flemish landscape painter
- Marten Holden Weiner, American television actor
- Marten Yorgantz (born 1946), French-Armenian singer and composer

== Fictional characters ==
- Marten Broadcloak, alias of Stephen King character Randall Flagg
- Marten Reed, in the webcomic Questionable Content

== See also ==
- Mårten, a list of people with the given name
- Märten (name), a list of people with the given name or surname
- Martens (surname)
- Maarten, given name
- Martin (disambiguation)
