= Emamzadeh Shir Mard =

Emamzadeh Shir Mard امامزاده شيرمرد
- Village
- Location within Iran
- Coordinates: 30°05′28″N 51°29′48″E
- Country: Iran
- Province: Fars
- County: Mamasani
- Bakhsh: Central
- Rural District: Bakesh-e Yek

Population (2006)
  - Total: 87
- Time zone: UTC+3:30 (IRST)
  - Summer (DST): UTC+4:30 (IRDT)

Emamzadeh Shir Mard (Persian: امامزاده شيرمرد, also Romanized as Emāmzādeh Shīr Mard; also known as Shīr Mard) is a village in Bakesh-e Yek Rural District, in the Central District of Mamasani County, Fars province, Iran. At the 2006 census, its population was 87, in 22 families.
