= Marts (surname) =

Marts is an English surname.

Notable people with this surname include:

- Alvin Lee Marts (born 1923), American sailor
- Lonnie Marts (born 1968), American American Football player

== Mårts ==
Mårts (Swedish pronunciation: [ˈmoːʈʂ]) is a Swedish surname.

- Pär Mårts (born 1953), Swedish ice hockey player
