= Berdún =

- Locality
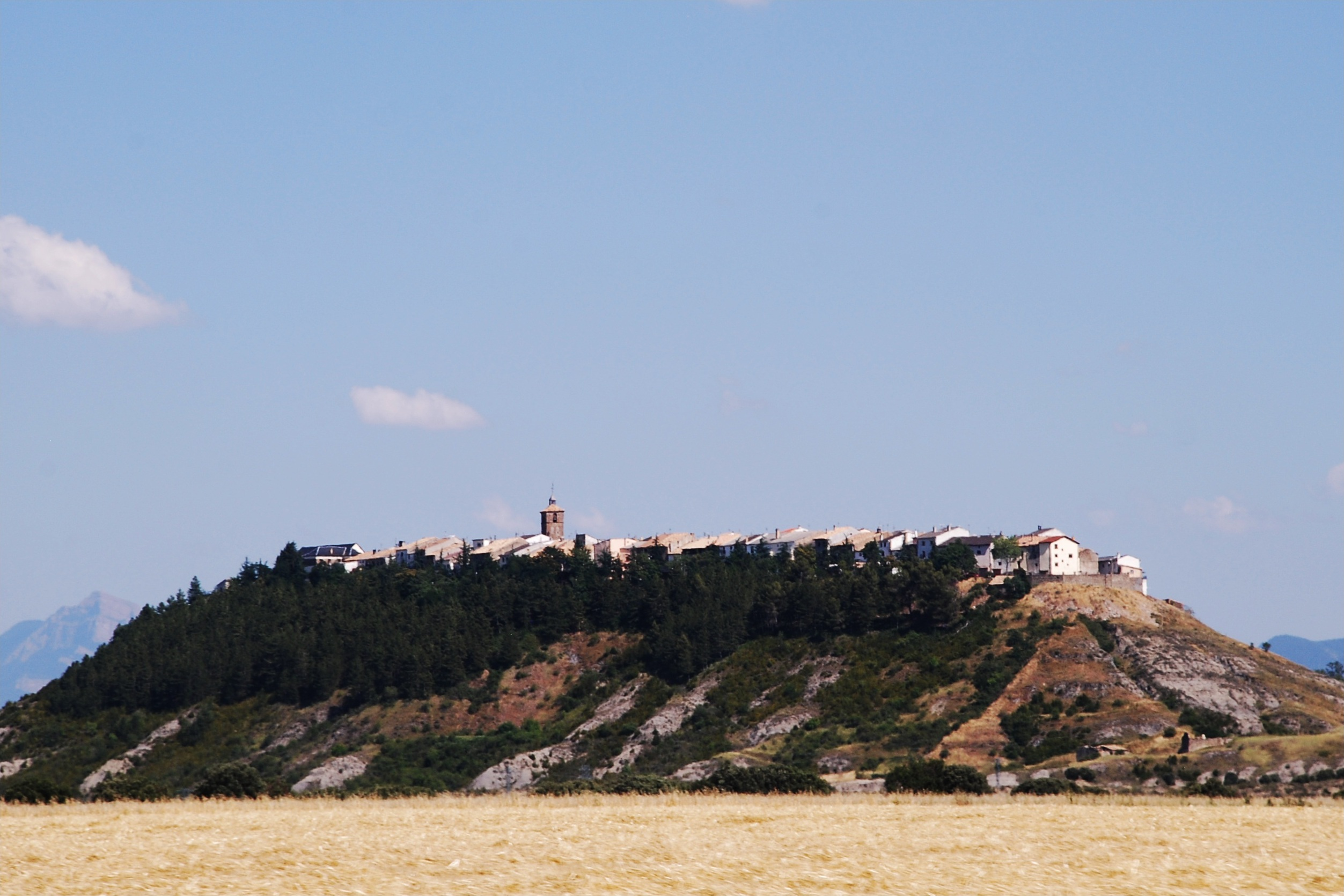

- Location within Aragon Location within Spain
- Coordinates: 42°36′12″N 0°51′30″W
- Country: Spain
- Autonomous community: Aragon
- Province: Province of Huesca
- Municipality: Canal de Berdún
- Elevation: 692 m (2,270 ft)

Population
  - Total: 210

Berdún is a locality and the capital of the municipality of Canal de Berdún, in Huesca province, Aragon, Spain. As of 2020, it has a population of 210.

== Geography ==
Berdún is located 82km northwest of Huesca.
