= Marda, Gumla =

Marda
- Village
- Location in Jharkhand, India Marda (India)
- Coordinates: 22.941474°N 84.477667°E
- Country: India
- State: Jharkhand
- District: Gumla

Government
  - Type: Federal democracy

Population (2011)
  - Total: 699

Languages *
  - Official: Hindi, Urdu
- Time zone: UTC+5:30 (IST)
- PIN: 835232
- Telephone/ STD code: 06524
- Vehicle registration: JH 07
- Literacy: 79.14%
- Lok Sabha constituency: Lohardaga
- Vidhan Sabha constituency: Gumla
- Website: gumla.nic.in

Marda is a village in the Raidih CD block in the Gumla subdivision of the Gumla district in the Indian state of Jharkhand.

== Geography ==
Cities, towns and locations in Gumla district in South Chotanagpur Division
M: municipality, CT: census town, R: rural/ urban centre, H: historical/ religious centre, T: tourist centre, B: Bauxite mining centre
Owing to space constraints in the small map, the actual locations in a larger map may vary slightly

=== Location ===
Marda is located at 22.941474°N 84.477667°E

=== Area overview ===
The map alongside presents a rugged area, consisting partly of flat-topped hills called pat and partly of an undulating plateau, in the south-western portion of Chota Nagpur Plateau. Three major rivers – the Sankh, South Koel and North Karo - along with their numerous tributaries, drain the area. The hilly area has large deposits of Bauxite. 93.7% of the population lives in rural areas.

Note: The map alongside presents some of the notable locations in the district. All places marked in the map are linked in the larger full screen map.

== Demographics ==
According to the 2011 Census of India, Marda had a total population of 699, of which 331 (47%) were males and 368 (53%) were females. Population in the age range 0–6 years was 119. The total number of literate persons in Marda was 459 (79.14% of the population over 6 years).

(*For language details see Raidih block#Language and religion)

== Culture ==
The Mahasadashiva temple is an 85 feet high temple, spread over an area of around 2 acres built in Kalinga architectural style. Apart from the main idol of Mahasadashiva, there are 84 other deities made of black stone in a seated style. The main idol is in Shiva’s unique virat form.

The website of the district administration presents detailed information about the deity: "There are 18 Puranas in Sanātana Dharma, out of which Shiva is described in 10 Puranas. From the study of other religious texts, it is known that there are innumerable forms in the 19 incarnations of Shiva, in which all kinds of human qualities like joy-sadness, forgiveness-anger etc. have been seen from time to time. Shiva has 108 names and some people also believe in 160 names. However, there are mainly three forms of Shiva - Shiva, Sadashiva and Mahasadashiva. Mahasadashiva is a symbol of a virat form who has 26 heads and 52 arms. This is a rare form that is seen in only a few temples in India."
