= Alfonso Marte =

Dominican footballer

Personal information
- Date of birth: 16 April 1992 (age 34)
- Place of birth: Boca Chica, Dominican Republic
- Height: 1.82 m (5 ft 11 1/2 in)
- Position: Right midfielder

Team information
- Current team: SV Saar 05 Saarbrücken

Youth career
- Bayer Leverkusen

Senior career*
Years	Team	Apps	(Gls)
2010–2011	Bayer Leverkusen II	15	(2)
2012–2013	SV Elversberg	18	(0)
2012–2013	SV Elversberg II	8	(2)
2013–2015	SC Idar-Oberstein	56	(5)
2015–	SV Saar 05 Saarbrücken	0	(0)

International career^{‡}
2015–	Dominican Republic	1	(0)
- * Club domestic league appearances and goals as of 23 May 2015 ‡ National team caps and goals as of 11 June 2015

Alfonso Marte (born 16 April 1992) is a Dominican footballer who plays for German club SV Saar 05 Saarbrücken as a midfielder.

== International career ==
Marte was named for the first time in Dominican Republic's main squad for the 2018 FIFA World Cup qualifiers. He made his international debut on 11 June 2015, starting in a 1–2 loss against Belize.
