= Mard-e Khaneh =

Mard-e Khaneh مردخانه
- Village
- Location within Iran
- Coordinates: 31°57′14″N 50°13′53″E
- Country: Iran
- Province: Chaharmahal and Bakhtiari
- County: Kuhrang
- Bakhsh: Central
- Rural District: Dasht-e Zarrin

Population (2006)
  - Total: 127
- Time zone: UTC+3:30 (IRST)
  - Summer (DST): UTC+4:30 (IRDT)

Mard-e Khaneh (Persian: مردخانه, also Romanized as Mard-e Khāneh; also known as Mard) is a village in Dasht-e Zarrin Rural District, in the Central District of Kuhrang County, Chaharmahal and Bakhtiari Province, Iran. At the 2006 census, its population was 127, in 22 families. The village is populated by Lurs.
