= Ahmet Cevdet Oran =

Ottoman-Turkish journalist (1862–1935)

- Born: 1862; Istanbul, Ottoman Empire
- Died: 27 May 1935 (aged 72–73); Ankara, Turkey
- Occupation: Journalist
- Years active: 1883–1935

Ahmet Cevdet Oran (mostly known as Ahmet Cevdet; 1862–27 May 1935) was a Turkish journalist who founded an influential newspaper, İkdam which was in circulation between 1894 and 1928. He was one of the early Turkish journalists who employed pure Turkish instead of Ottoman Turkish in his writings.

== Biography ==
Ahmet Cevdet was born in Istanbul in 1862. His father was Hacı Ahmed Efendi, a well-known tobacco merchant. He graduated from Kaptanpaşa Junior High School and then from Mülkiye, school of political sciences, and the law school. He took lessons in Arabic, Persian and French and learned German and Greek. He started his career as a translator at the newspaper Tercümân-ı Hakîkat when he was twenty-one. Later he began to publish his first articles in this newspaper. Meanwhile, he also published articles in Takvîm-i Vekāyi and served in its editorial board. Later, he worked as a civil servant at Ottoman Bank. He returned to journalism and worked as the chief editor of different newspapers, including Sabah, Tarik and Saadet. In 1894, he launched a newspaper entitled İkdam which he also edited.

Ahmet Cevdet was in opposition to the Committee of Union and Progress, which took over the Ottoman administration after the proclamation of the Second Constitutional Monarchy. Therefore, he went into exile in Switzerland. He supported the Turkish War of Independence and returned to the country following the establishment of Republic of Turkey. In addition to journalism, he was the publisher of many books such as Evliya Çelebi's Seyahatnâme and Şemseddin Sâmî's Kamus-ı Türki.

Ahmet Cevdet was married and had three daughters one of whom was the mother of Turkish social scientist Şerif Mardin. He died in Ankara on 27 May 1935.
