= Mart (broadcaster) =

mArt (Multicultural Amsterdam Radio and Television) is a local broadcasting station in Amsterdam. Founded by Harvey Heuvel, it was originally focused on the Multi Cultural Dutch audience. It is now more focused on Surinamese community in Amsterdam, but is broadening its horizons to other ethnic minorities. It is a non-profit organisation, run by volunteers and unemployed and funded by donors, sponsors and advertisements.

All broadcasts are on the Internet, with only a selection transmits by radiowaves. As a result, it is also listened to in Suriname. For a long time, there were only radio transmissions, but as of early 2009, there are plans to also start TV transmissions, which are now, on the Internet, more easily done on a small budget.
