= Marte =

Marte may refer to:

- Marte, Nigeria, a Local Government Area in Borno State
- Marte (surname), including a list of people with the name
- C.D. Marte, a Mexican football club
- C.D. Atlético Marte, a Salvadoran football club
- ST Marte, a tug in service with Wilson Son SA Comercio Industria, Brazil from 1966
- Marte (missile), anti-ship missile

== See also ==
- Mars (disambiguation)
