= İkdam =

Ottoman Turkish newspaper (1894–1928)

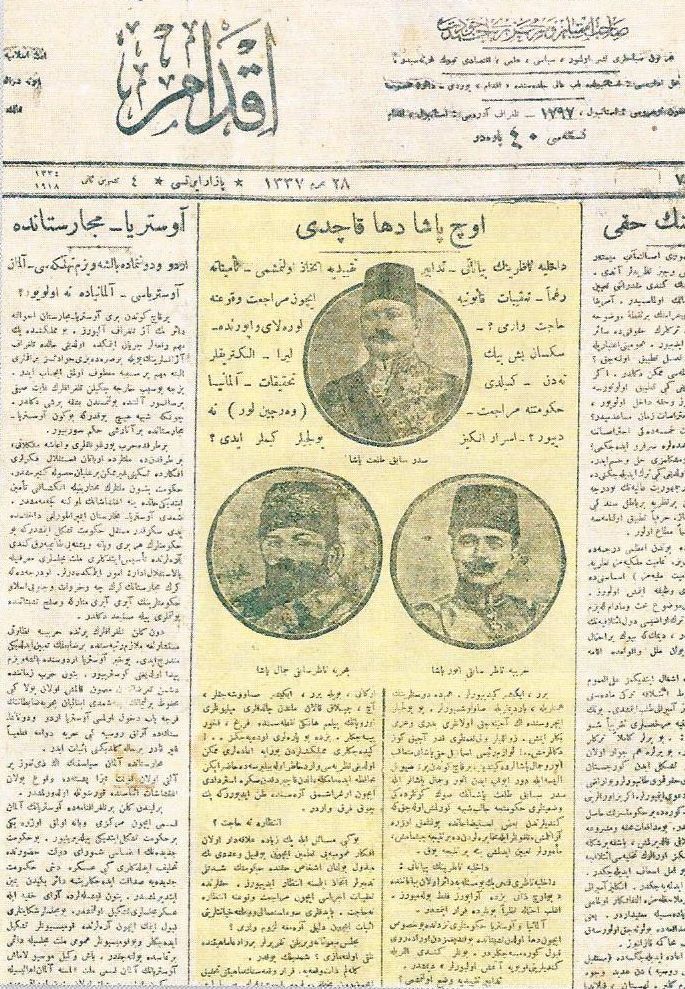
İkdam's front page on 4 November 1918, after the Three Pashas fled the country during the final days of WWI.

İkdam (Turkish: Effort) was a newspaper in the Ottoman Empire and Turkey published between 1894 and 1928. During its lifetime it became the most popular newspaper in Istanbul.

Ahmet Cevdet Oran established the paper in 1894, and the first issue appeared on 23 September. It initially advocated for Turkism, but held a critical attitude towards the Committee of Union and Progress after the Young Turk Revolution had occurred. Yakup Karaosmanoğlu was a journalist with İkdam during the Turkish War of Independence. Another notable contributor was Ahmet Haşim. İkdam was one of the publications which supported the foreign mandate and opposed the national struggle led by Mustafa Kemal in Anatolia.

Following the establishment of the Republic of Turkey the paper objected to the policies of the Turkish government, including making Ankara the capital city instead of Istanbul as well as the presidency of Mustafa Kemal Atatürk. Partly due to its dissident approach, the ownership of the paper was changed, and it came into the ownership of Ali Naci Karacan.

The paper was disestablished on 31 December 1928. In its final month of publication, it switched to the then-recently introduced Latin Turkish alphabet.
