= Maradi =

Maradi may refer to:

- Maradi Region, Niger
- Maradi, Niger
- Roman Catholic Diocese of Maradi
- Maradi Airport
