= Märt Sults =

Estonian politician (born 1961)

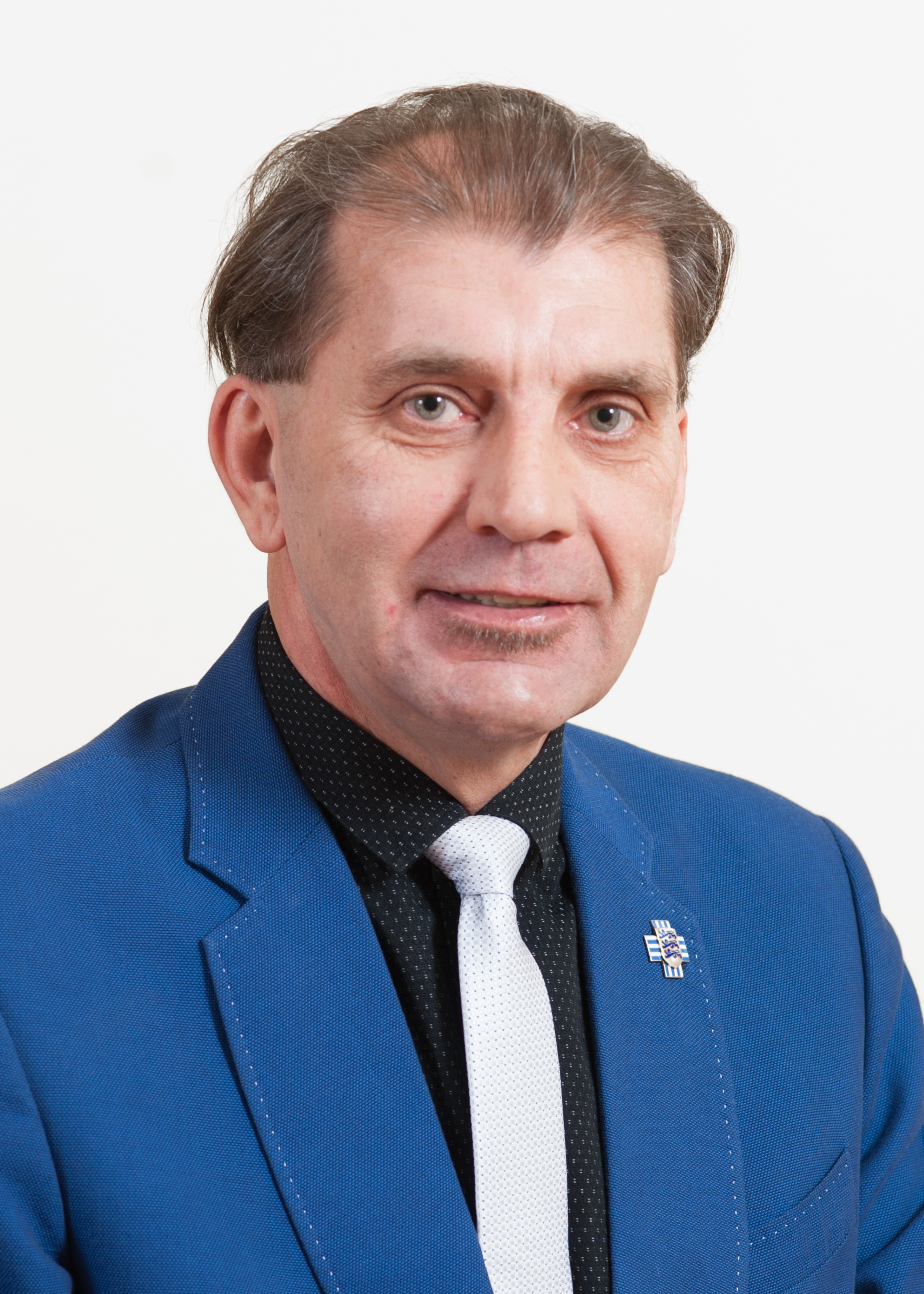

Märt Sults (born 24 March 1961 in Valga) is an Estonian politician. He was a member of the XIII Riigikogu.

In 1984 he graduated from University of Tartu with a degree in inorganic chemistry/teacher, and in 1989 with a degree in school psychology.

From 1995 to 2015 he was the director of Tallinn Art Gymnasium and is the current director of the Tartu Art School.

Since 2003 he has been a member of Estonian Centre Party.
