= Saint-Mard =

Saint-Mard may refer to the following places:

== Belgium ==
- Saint-Mard, Belgium, a locality in the municipality of Virton, province of Luxembourg

== France ==
- Saint-Mard, Aisne, a commune in the department of Aisne
- Saint-Mard, Charente-Maritime, a commune in the department of Charente-Maritime
- Saint-Mard, Meurthe-et-Moselle, a commune in the department of Meurthe-et-Moselle
- Saint-Mard, Seine-et-Marne, a commune in the department of Seine-et-Marne
- Saint-Mard, Somme, a commune in the department of Somme
- Saint-Mard-de-Réno, a commune in the department of Orne
- Saint-Mard-de-Vaux, a commune in the department of Saône-et-Loire
- Saint-Mard-lès-Rouffy, a commune in the department of Marne
- Saint-Mard-sur-Auve, a commune in the department of Marne
- Saint-Mard-sur-le-Mont, a commune in the department of Marne
