= Mared (village) =

Mared مارد
- Village
- Location within Iran
- Coordinates: 30°30′12″N 48°18′51″E
- Country: Iran
- Province: Khuzestan
- County: Khorramshahr
- Bakhsh: Central
- Rural District: Howmeh-ye Sharqi

Population (2006)
  - Total: 32
- Time zone: UTC+3:30 (IRST)
  - Summer (DST): UTC+4:30 (IRDT)

Mared (Persian: مارد, also Romanized as Māred, Mārad, Mārd, and Mārid) is a village in Howmeh-ye Sharqi Rural District, in the Central District of Khorramshahr County, Khuzestan province, Iran. At the 2006 census, its population was 32, in 9 families. Iraqi army personnel crossed the Karun river at Mared on October 9, 1980, as part of an attempted flanking operation during the Iran–Iraq War.
