= Alt Ter =

Natural and historical region in Catalonia

- Natural region
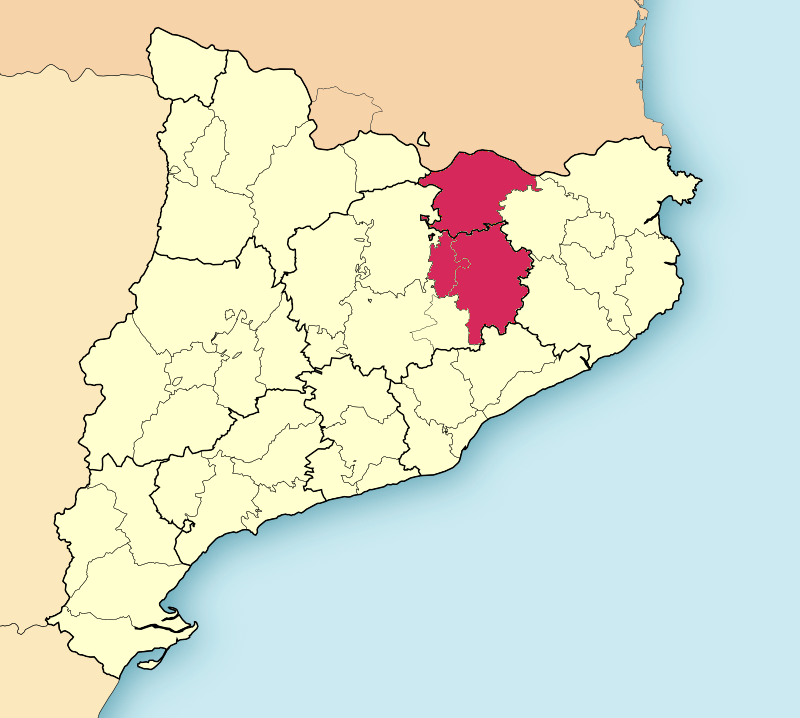
- Sovereign state: Spain
- Community: Catalonia
- Largest city: Vic
- Counties: Lluçanès; Osona; Ripollès

Area
  - Total: 2,428.4 km^{2} (937.6 sq mi)

Population (2022)
  - Total: 191,534
  - Density: 78.873/km^{2} (204.28/sq mi)

Alt Ter (Catalan pronunciation: [ˈaɫ tɛr]; English: Upper Ter) is a natural region and proposed vegueria by the Ter river in Catalonia.

Consisting of the counties of Lluçanès, Osona and Ripollès, it is part of the regions of Central Catalonia and Girona. with 191,534 inhabitants as of 2022.

== History ==
Historically, the proposal to become a vegueria has been based on Region 6 of the division made during the Spanish Republic, which comprised Osona, Ripollès and Baixa Cerdanya, following the Trans-Pyrenean Railway, with Vic as its seat. In 2003, a platform for the vegueria of Alt Ter was created, encompassing Osona and Ripollès (and Garrotxa in some instances).

In 2023, the municipalities of the counties of Bages and Osona were integrated into the new county of Lluçanès, thus making up part of the Alt Ter vegueria proposal.

== Geography ==
The region's most populous settlements are Vic, Manlleu, Roda de Ter, Torelló, Ripoll, Ribes de Freser, Prats de Lluçanès and Camprodon.

=== Mountains ===
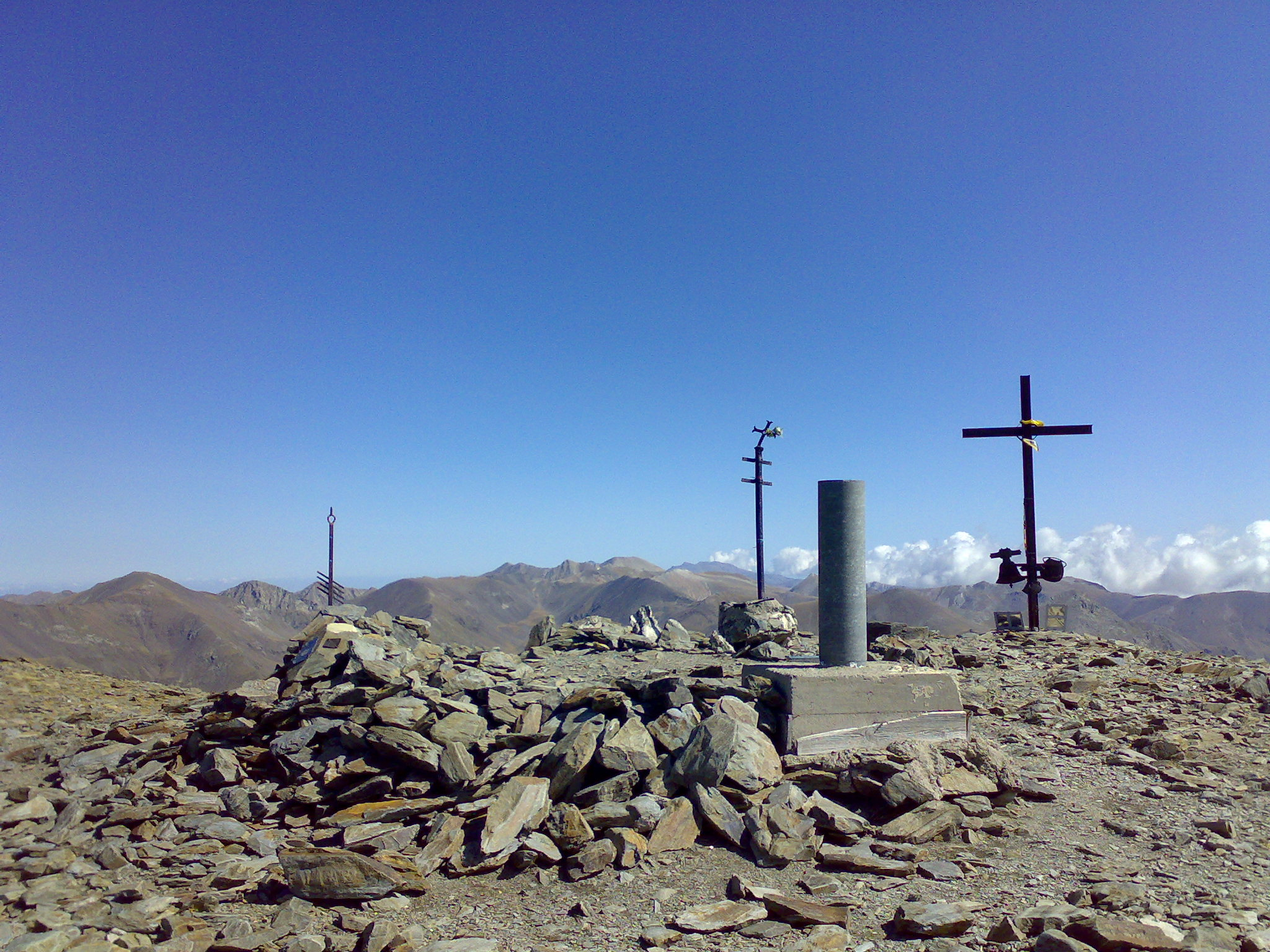
Puigmal, the highest peak of Alt Ter

To the north of Alt Ter, specifically Ripollès, lies a set of massifs and mountain ranges of the Pyrenees with high peaks: the Creu de Maians (2,020 m), the Puigmal (2,909.8 m), the Pic de Finestrelles (2,827 m), Pic d'Eina (2,789 m), Pic de Noufonts (2,861 m), Pic de l'Infern (2,869 m), Bastiments (2,881 m), Pic de la Dona (2,702 m), Costabona (2,465 m), and Montfalgars (1,610.8 m), all on the line of the border with Northern Catalonia in France.

Further south, there is another mountain range, parallel to the previous one. To the west of this range lies the Montgrony chain and to the east the Serra Cavallera chain (Taga, 2,039.9 m).

Further south, there are other mountain ranges running parallel to the previous ones, all part of the Pyrenees. To the south-west are the Tubau lowlands and the Serra de Matamala mountain range. To the south-east, there is a group of mountain ranges that come into contact with the Transversal Range: the Milany and Santa Magdalena ranges and Puigsacalm (1,514 m), on the border with Garrotxa.

In Osona county, to the north, lies the Serra de Bellmunt, home to Bellmunt mountain (1,247 m). In the north-western part of the region, in Collsacabra sub-county, lies the Serra de Cabrera, home to the Cabrera mountain (1,308 m).

Between Osona and Lluçanès counties lie mountains such as Miranda (911 m), Turó de la Creu de Gurb (842 m), home to the Gurb castle, and Santa Llúcia de Sobremunt (958 m).

== Population ==
Counties	Population (2023)
Lluçanès	3,993
Osona	167,506
Ripollès	6,197

== Sources ==
- Font i Garolera, Jaume (2003). La Vegueria de l'Alt Ter. Bases històriques i geogràfiques [The vegueria of Alt Ter. Historical and geographical background] (in Catalan). Ausa. ISSN 0210-5853.
