= Catalunya Central =

Vegueria (region) of Catalonia

Coordinates: 41°46′23″N 1°53′48″E

Central Catalonia
- Vegueria
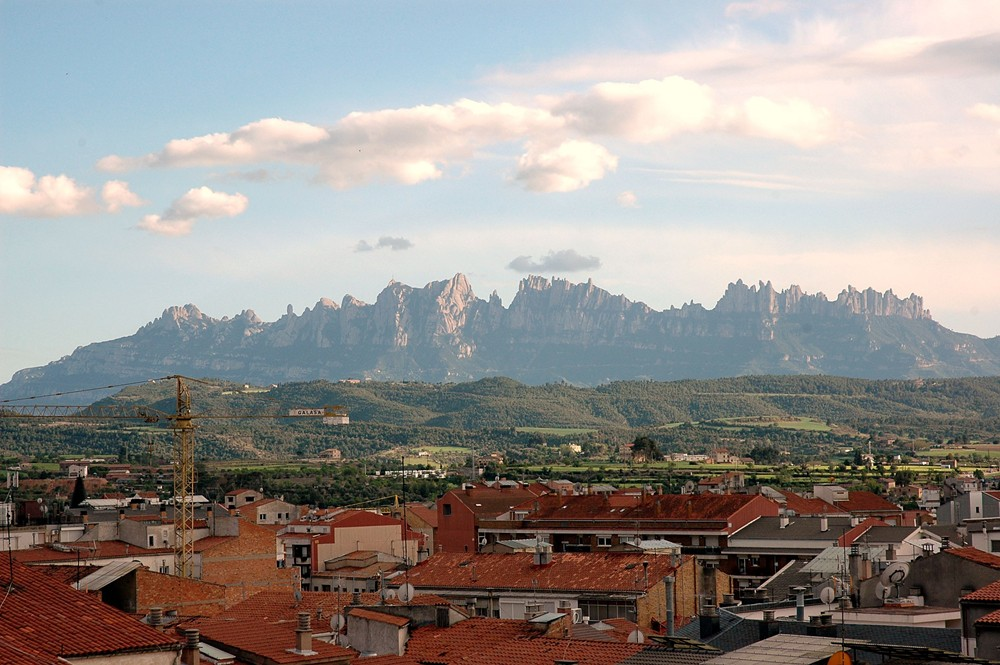
- The Montserrat mountain range seen from Manresa

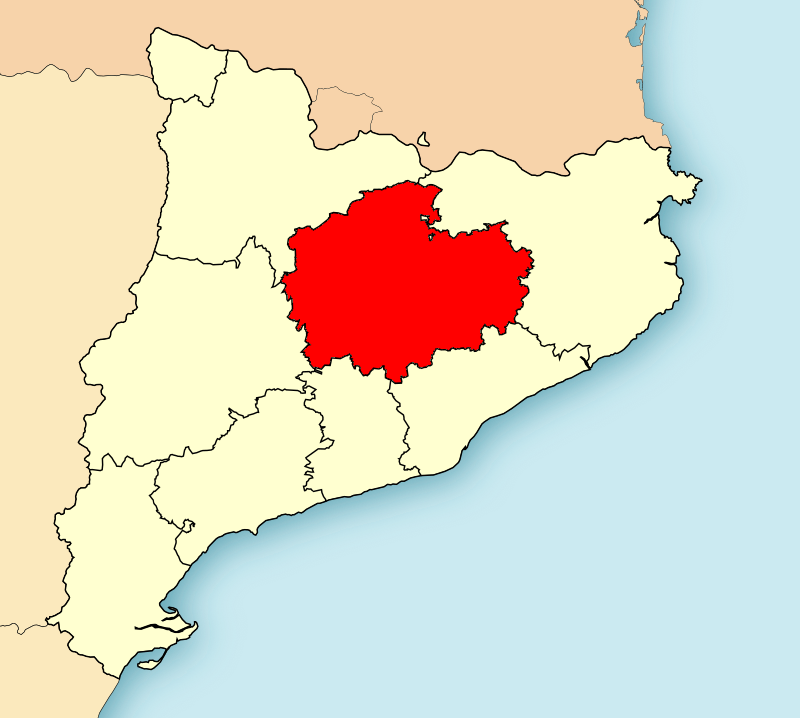
- Sovereign state: Spain
- Community: Catalonia
- Capital: Manresa (de facto)
- Counties: Bages; Berguedà; Lluçanès; Moianès; Osona; Solsonès

Area
  - Total: 4,745.6 km^{2} (1,832.3 sq mi)

Population (2022)
  - Total: 412,033
  - Density: 86.824/km^{2} (224.87/sq mi)

Central Catalonia (Catalan: Catalunya Central; IPA: [kə.təˈɫu.ɲə sənˈtɾaɫ]), also known as Comarques Centrals, is one of the nine regions (vegueries) of Catalonia.

It had 412,033 inhabitants in 2022. Located around the upper and middle sections of the Llobregat and Ter rivers, it includes the counties of Bages, Berguedà, Lluçanès, Moianès, Osona and Solsonès. It borders to the north-west with Alt Pirineu, to the west with Ponent, to the south with Penedès, to the south-east with Barcelona and to the north and north-east with Girona.

Its de facto capital is Manresa, the most populous city, as a law has not set one yet.

The Central Catalonia counties of Lluçanès and Osona, as well as Ripollès, which is located in the Girona region, comprise the natural region and proposed separate vegueria of Alt Ter.

== Demography ==
| Comarca | Capital | Population (2025) | Area (km^{2}) |
|---|---|---|---|
| Bages | Manresa | 187,620 | 1,092 |
| Berguedà | Berga | 41,523 | 1,185 |
| Lluçanès (Note: Lluçanès was established as an administrative county in 2023.) | Prats de Lluçanès | 5,723 | 227 |
| Moianès | Moià | 14,864 | 338 |
| Osona | Vic | 165,946 | 1,019 |
| Solsonès | Solsona | 15,578 | 1,161 |

== Use of Catalan ==
According to a 2018 poll, regular use of Catalan in Central Catalonia stands at almost 60%, whereas the use of Castilian is around 27%. 7% of inhabitants are regular users of both Catalan and Castilian, while 5% have other languages that are neither Castilian nor Catalan as their usual languages.

Within the region, 97% of the population can understand Catalan, 91% can read it and 90% can speak it, while in terms of writing, only 77% are able to write it correctly. The vegueria is the second in Catalonia, after Terres de l'Ebre, where Catalan is most widely used.

== Local media ==
Logo of Canal Taronja, the region's local television station.

=== Television ===
Although the most viewed channels are the ones broadcasting for the whole of Catalonia, such as those of Televisió de Catalunya or RTVE, the region has three local multiplexes. The region's local broadcaster is the private station Canal Taronja. The county of Berguedà also features Televisió del Berguedà, whereas Osona and Lluçanès newspaper El 9 Nou offers a local television channel, also watchable from Moianès.
