= Mar Pujol =

Catalan singer-songwriter

- Born: 1999 (age 26–27); Prats de Lluçanès, Catalonia
- Genres: Folk, singer-songwriter
- Occupations: Composer, singer, guitarist
- Instruments: Voice, guitar
- Years active: 2020s

Mar Pujol (born 1999 in Prats de Lluçanès) is a Catalan composer, guitarist, and singer.

== Biography ==
She received her musical training at the School of Music and Arts of Lluçanès (EMAL) and studied Early Childhood and Primary Education with a specialization in music at the University of Lleida, where she developed as a self-taught singer-songwriter.

At the age of twenty-two, she began her career as a singer-songwriter, having previously performed in the Rodautors cycle. She has released two records: Trepa (self-released, 2022) and Cançons de rebost (Hidden Track Records, 2024), her first full-length album, which won the 2025 Enderrock Critics’ Award for Best Singer-Songwriter Album. She has performed in several venues such as Jazz Cava in Vic, Heliogàbal and Apolo in Barcelona, Clap in Mataró, and Stroika in Manresa, as well as at festivals including Cantilafont, Aphònica, Vida Festival, Fira Mediterrània, Primavera Pro, and Altaveu Festival.

Using voice and guitar as her primary instruments, with intimate lyrics filled with literary figures and references to nature and her roots, she describes her music as Mediterranean folk-pop. She cites influences including Maria del Mar Bonet, Sílvia Pérez Cruz, Marala, Faneka, Maria Arnal, Ernest Crusats, Xarim Aresté, and Anna Andreu, with whom she collaborated on the song "Turons".

== Discography ==
- "Caverna" on the collective album 085XX (El Refugi, 2022)
- Trepa (self-released, 2022)
- Cançons de rebost (Hidden Track Records, 2024). Winner of the 2025 Enderrock Critics’ Award for Best Singer-Songwriter Album.
