= Alpens =

- Municipality
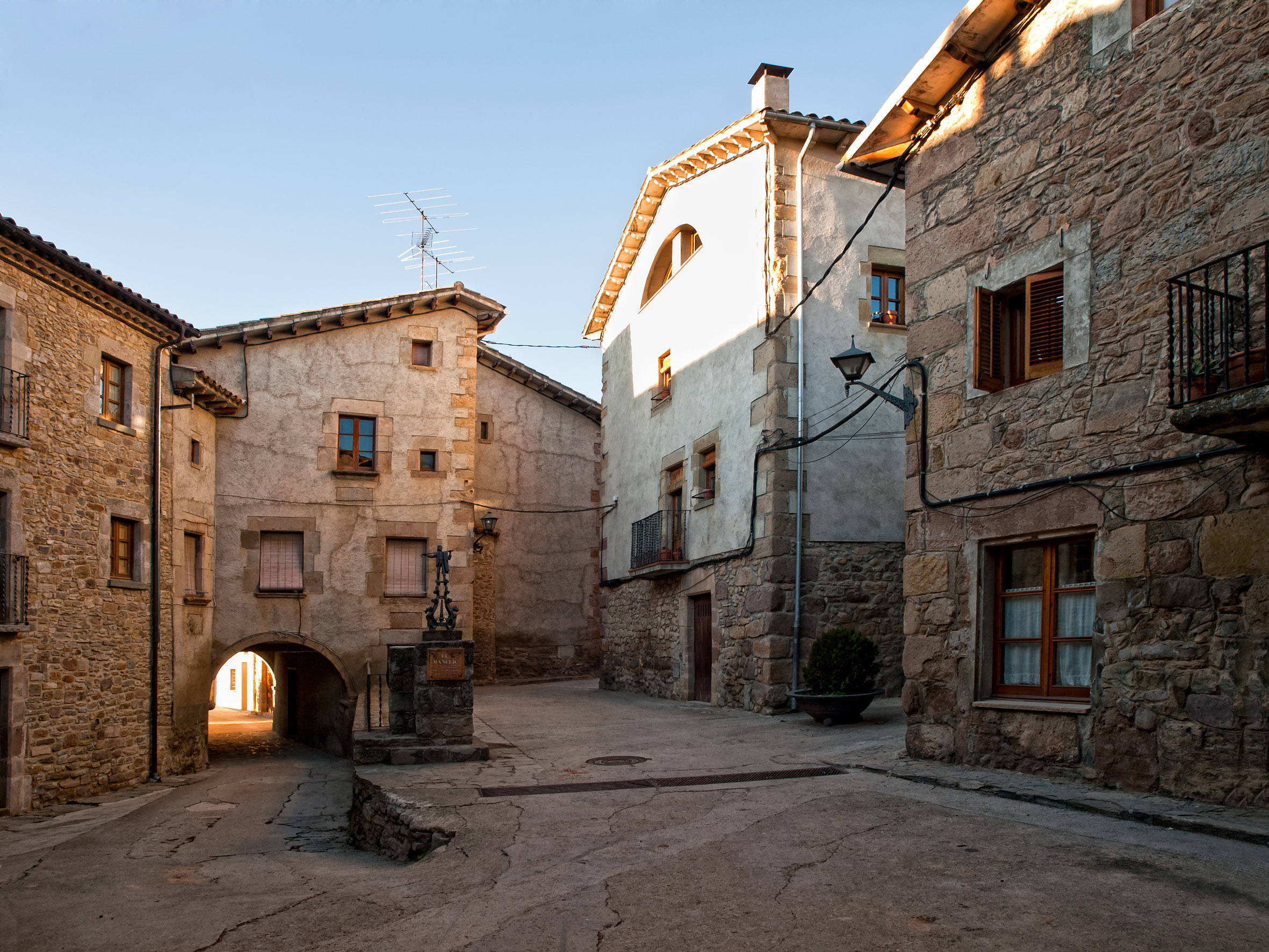
- Plaça Joan Prat Roca, Alpens

- Coat of arms

- Location in Catalonia Alpens (Spain)
- Coordinates: 42°07′N 2°06′E
- Country: Spain
- Community: Catalonia
- Province: Barcelona
- Comarca: Lluçanès

Government
  - Mayor: Montserrat Barniol Carcasona (2015)

Area
  - Total: 13.8 km^{2} (5.3 sq mi)
- Elevation: 855 m (2,805 ft)

Population (2025-01-01)
  - Total: 267
  - Density: 19.3/km^{2} (50.1/sq mi)
- Demonyms: Alpensí, alpensina
- Website: alpens.cat

Alpens (Catalan pronunciation: [əlˈpɛns]) is a municipality situated in the comarca of Lluçanès, in the province of Barcelona, Catalonia, Spain. Alpens is located 105 km from the city of Barcelona and 13 km from the comarca capital, Prats de Lluçanès.

In the municipal area there are ruins of a fortress which dates to the year 1109, the fortress of Freixenet. It is one of the places catalogued by the government as sites of Spanish cultural heritage. There is also the 10th-century church of Sant Pere de Serrallonga.

In 2015, the municipality voted to join a proposed new comarca of Lluçanès, but the plan was put on hold due to insufficient support. Formerly part of Osona, it was finally incorporated into the new Lluçanès comarca in 2023.
