= Riera de Merlès =

River in Spain

Merlès
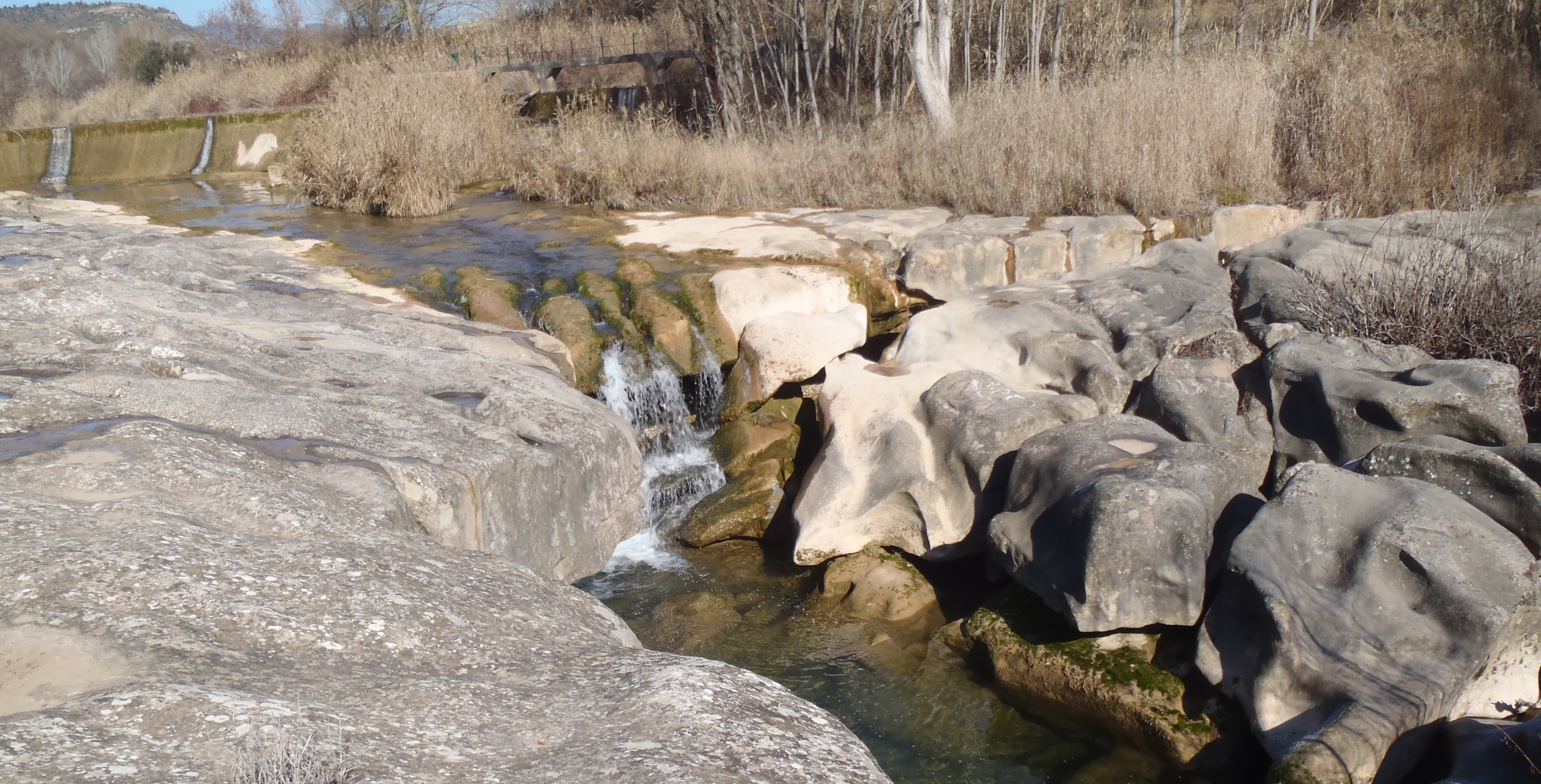
- The riera de Merlès in winter, passing through the village of Santa Maria de Merlès

Location
- Country: Spain

Physical characteristics
- Source
  - location: Rasos de Tubau in Sant Jaume de Frontanyà and Viladonja
  - elevation: 1,485 m (4,872 ft)
- Mouth
  - location: Llobregat River in Puig-reig
  - coordinates: 41°55′36.01″N 1°52′55.51″E
  - elevation: 345 m (1,132 ft)
- Basin size: 173 km^{2} (67 sq mi)
- Discharge
  - average: 0.90 m^{3}/s (32 cu ft/s)

Basin features
- River system: Llobregat

The Riera de Merlès is a small river that passes through the comarques of Osona, Bages, and Berguedà. It is formed by the confluence of several small mountain creeks and torrents that descend the Rasos de Tubau, in the municipalities of Sant Jaume de Frontanyà and Les Llosses.

Historically, the Merlès marked several administrative frontiers. These include the ancient counties of Berga and Osona, the dioceses of Solsona and Vic, and the modern comarques of Berguedà and Lluçanès.
