= Sant Feliu Sasserra =

- Municipality
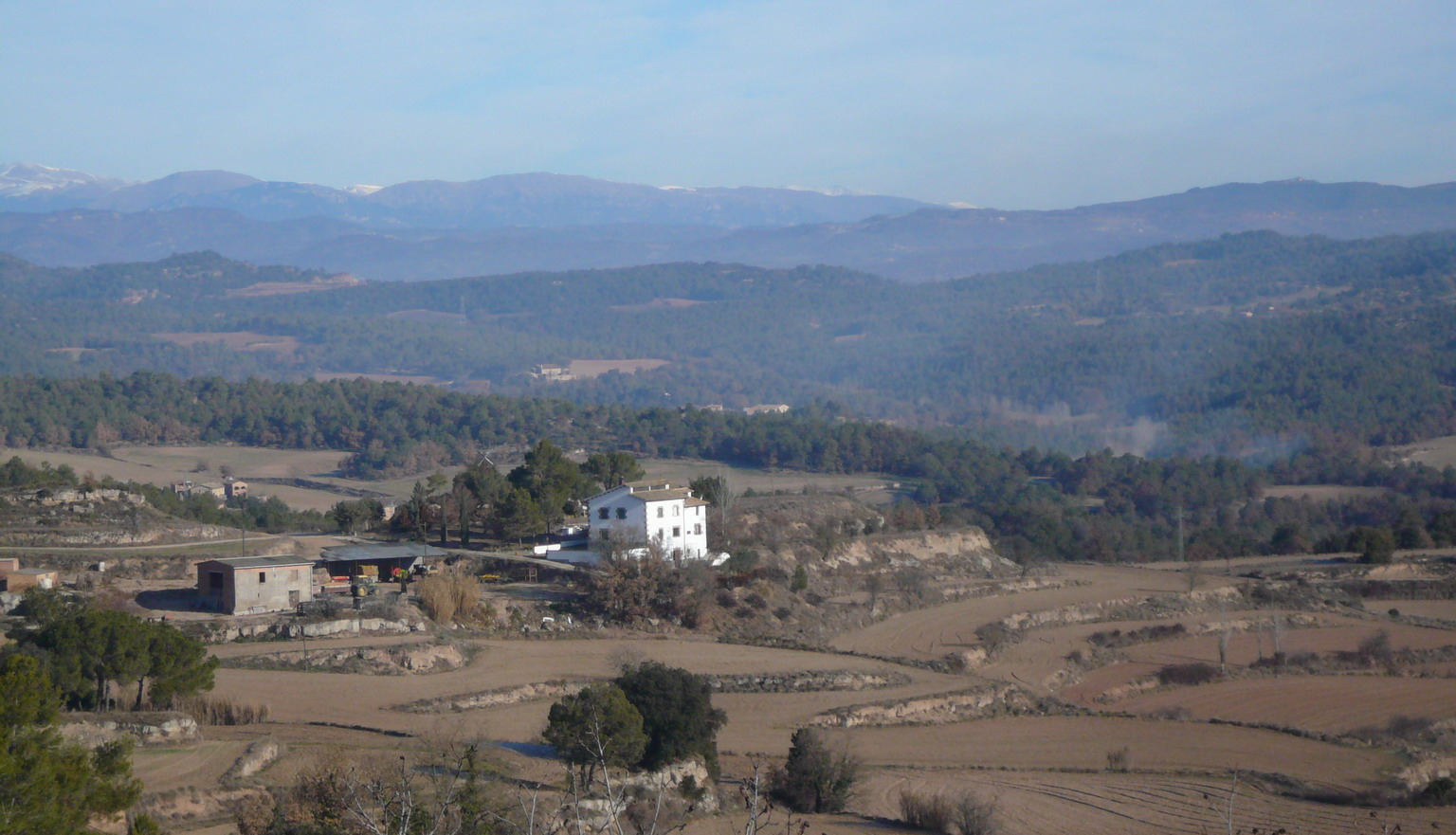
- Cal Nons as seen from Les Cases Noves

- Flag Coat of arms

- Map showing location within Bages

- Location in Catalonia Sant Feliu Sasserra (Spain)
- Coordinates: 41°56′47″N 02°01′23″E
- Country: Spain
- Community: Catalonia
- Province: Barcelona
- Comarca: Bages

Government
  - Mayor: Joan Ramon Soler Obradors (2015) (ERC)

Area
  - Total: 22.4 km^{2} (8.6 sq mi)
- Elevation: 617 m (2,024 ft)

Population (2025-01-01)
  - Total: 633
  - Density: 28.3/km^{2} (73.2/sq mi)
- Demonym(s): Santfeliuenc, santfeliuenca, feliuenc, feliuenca
- Website: www.santfeliusasserra.cat

Sant Feliu Sasserra (Old Catalan for 'Saint Felix the-Mountain-Range'; Catalan pronunciation: [ˈsaɱ fəˈliw səˈsɛrə]) is a municipality in the extreme north-east of the comarca of Bages, in Catalonia. It is also within the natural comarca of Lluçanès.

The municipality's name has its origins in several features of the town. It is named Sant Feliu after a primitive church erected atop a rock named the roca d'en Feliu, or "Felix's Rock". The main road through the municipality, which connected Prats de Lluçanès with Artés in Bages, followed the area's hilly natural contours along a ridge, hence Sasserra.

The municipality surrounds an exclave of Oristà.

Although the municipality lies within the natural region of Lluçanès, it voted in 2015 not to join a proposed new comarca of that name, but the plan was put on hold due to insufficient support. In 2023 it briefly became incorporated into the new Lluçanès comarca, before the municipality voted to reunite with Bages.

== Sites of interest ==
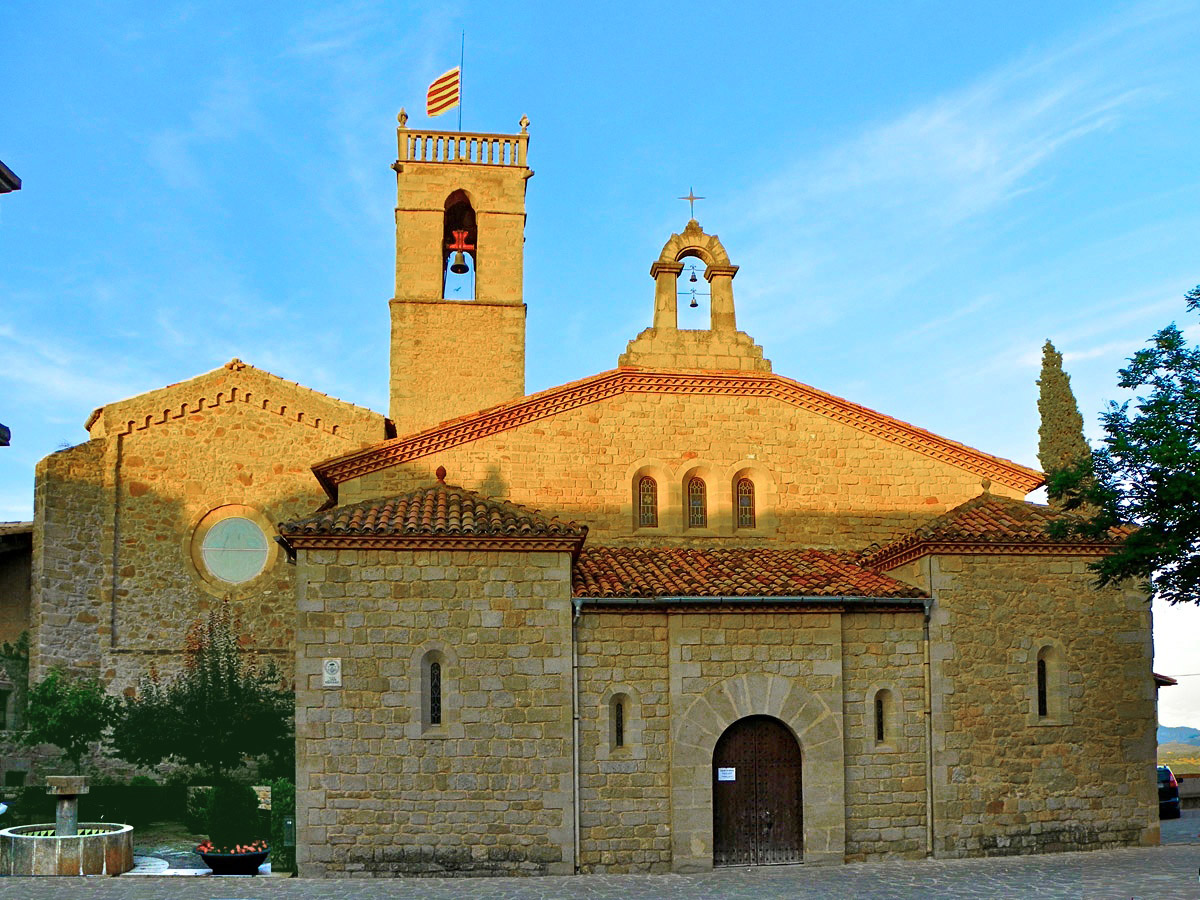
The Church of Sant Feliu

- The Casa del Consell, in the Gothic style, former seat of the sotsvegueria of Lluçanès.
- The Church of Sant Feliu, in the Gothic style, with a Romanesque vestibule.

== Demography ==
1900	1930	1950	1970	1986	2009
559	691	672	591		641
