= Olost =

- Municipality
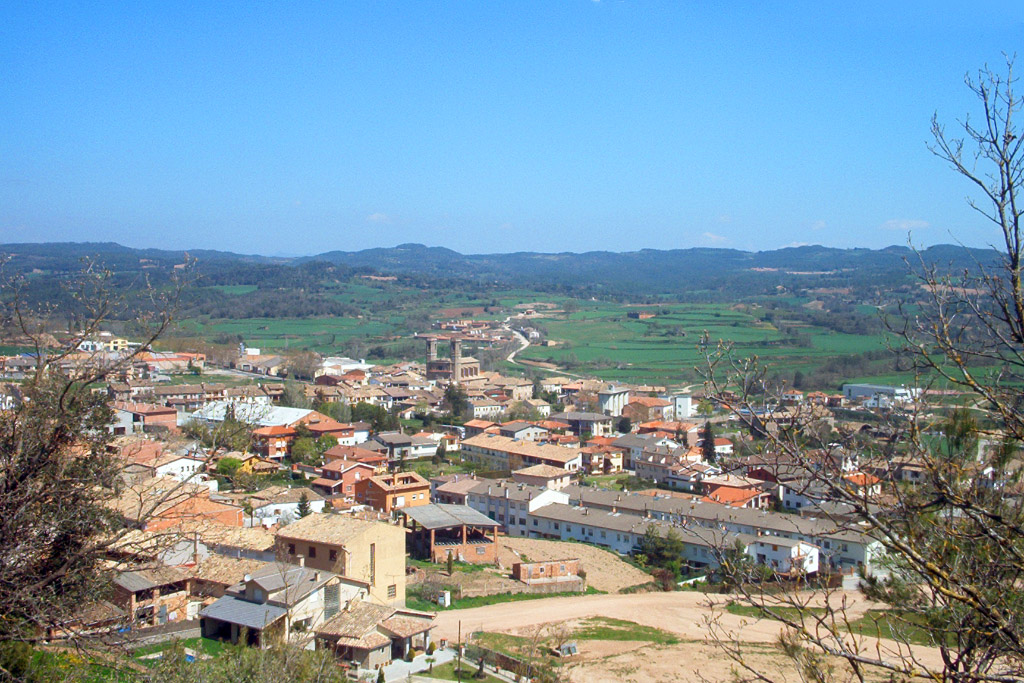
- Olost

- Flag Coat of arms

- Location in Catalonia Olost (Spain)
- Coordinates: 41°59′N 2°6′E
- Country: Spain
- Community: Catalonia
- Province: Barcelona
- Comarca: Lluçanès

Government
  - Mayor: Josep Maria Freixanet Mayans (2015)

Area
  - Total: 29.4 km^{2} (11.4 sq mi)

Population (2025-01-01)
  - Total: 1,209
  - Density: 41.1/km^{2} (107/sq mi)
- Website: www.olost.cat

Olost (Catalan pronunciation: [uˈlɔst]) is a municipality in the province of Barcelona, Catalonia, Spain. It has less than 1,200 people, situated on a plain 669 meters above sea level at 20 km from Vic in the center of the ancient shire or comarca of Lluçanès, before in the comarca of Osona. In the center of the village stands the church of Santa Maria d'Olost of monumental size, with a large façade and two bell towers. Its construction started in the 10th century and ended in the 18th century. Near Olost are the two small settlements of Santa Creu de Jutglars (built in 984) and the Vila with Sant Gil de la Vila (built in 1038) and the unusual Castell d'Olost, built in 1155 with added elements of the 14th and 15th centuries, that lies in a depression next to a stream in the district of Orista. Even though it was a fortified farm, it has the structure of a castle; it is nearly hidden from view for protection in the Middle Ages.

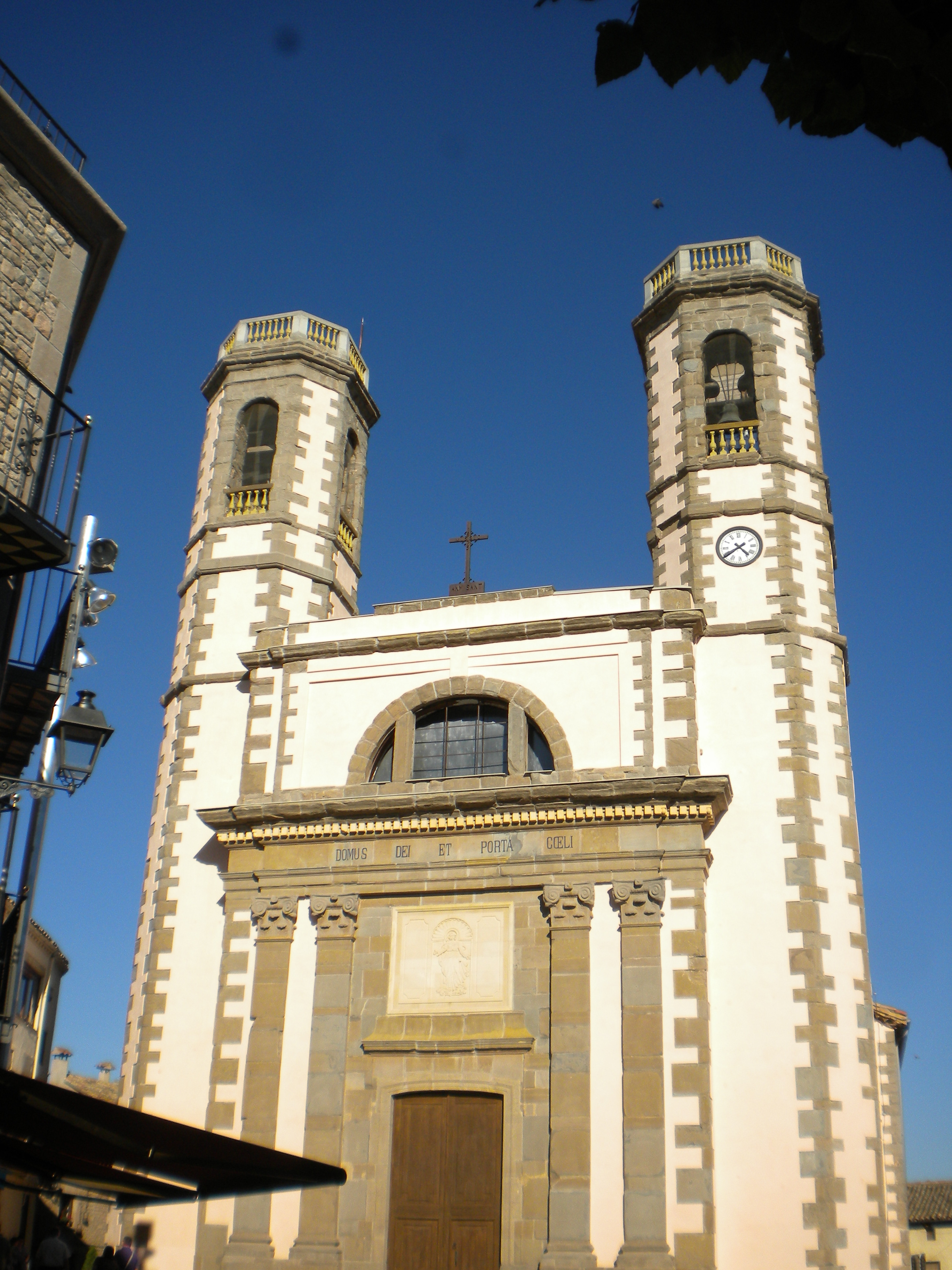
The church of Santa Maria d'Olost

Near the village, on the summit of a small hill stands the hermitage of Sant Adjutori (1714)

In the Middle Ages, the village of Olost was on one of the roads taken by troubadours and "jutglars" to cross the Pyrenees. It can be the origin of the name of the settlement of Santa Creu de Jutglars (jugglers or troubadours). Some historians have emphasised that the incidence of the letters OSS, SOS, OS in the names of villages of southern France and Catalunya stands for villages whose names were of Cathar origin and were founded or deeply influenced by Catharism in the 11th–13th centuries.

The village feast in honor of its patron saint is on August 15. The village has a public school and two factories. The nearest train station is in Vic and from there a minibus provides transportation service. The main products in the village are agricultural:corn, potatoes, sunflower seeds and wheat. Nearby farms raise cows, pigs and poultry.

Near Olost at 6 km, is the artificial lake and dam of Reixach or of Santa Creu de Joglars over the river Gavarresa. To reach it one must take the road from Olost to Prats de Lluçanès and take the private road to Reixach a few km from Olost. The lake is good for some fishing of small and medium carp (Cyprinus carpio) and some northern pike (Esox lucius) that was introduced from North America.

In 2015, the municipality voted to join a proposed new comarca of Lluçanès, but the plan was put on hold due to insufficient support. Formerly part of Osona, it was finally incorporated into the new Lluçanès comarca in 2023.

Demographic evolution
900	1515	1717	1857	1900	1930	1950	1970	1981	1986	1990	1994	1996	2006	2008
--	17	451	1211	917	1.089	1.120	904	961	948	969	1193	1204	1187	1199
