= Sant Agustí de Lluçanès =

- Municipality
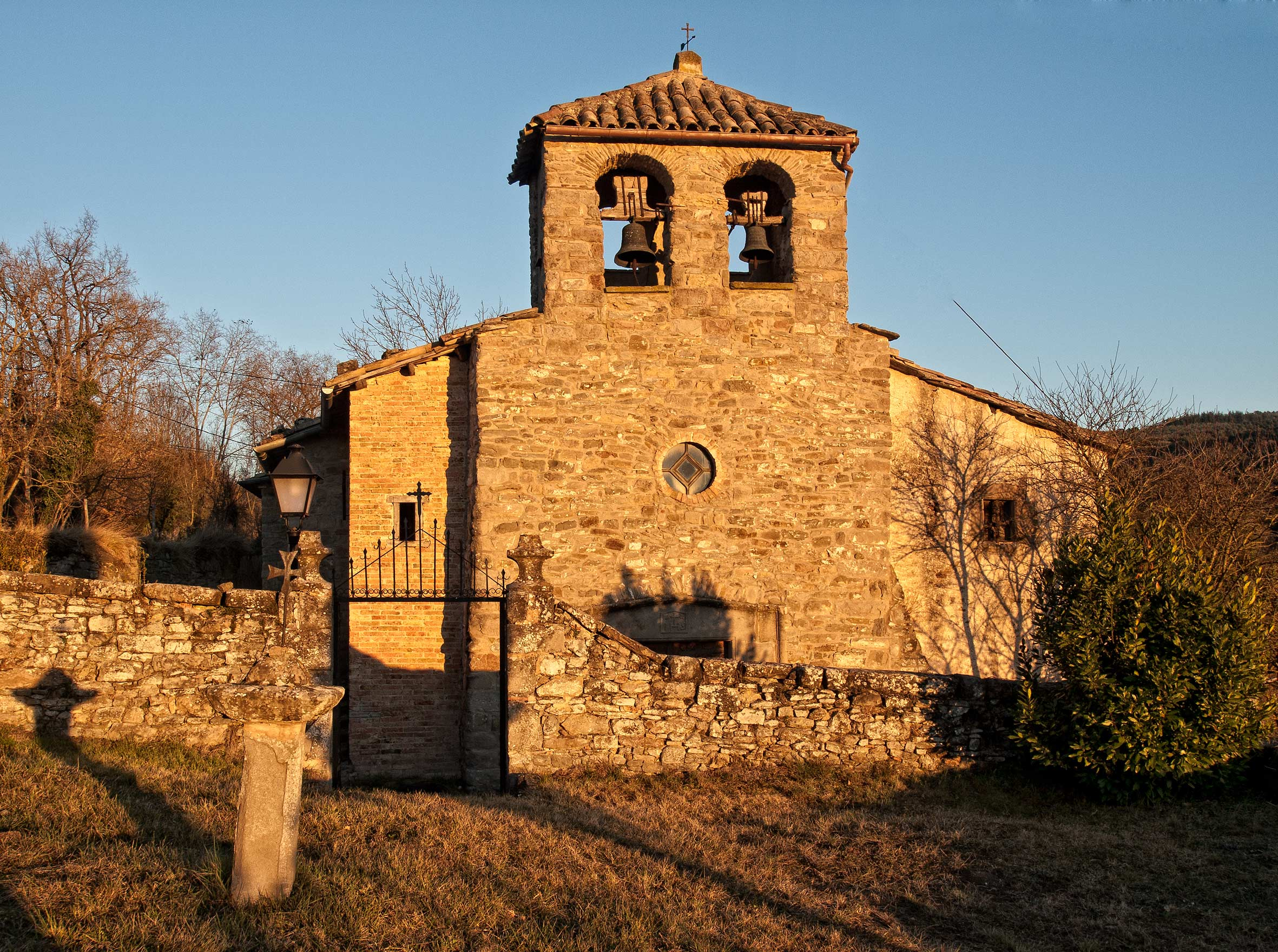
- Church of Sant Agustí de Lluçanès

- Flag Coat of arms

- Location in Catalonia
- Coordinates: 42°5′13″N 2°7′42″E
- Country: Spain
- Community: Catalonia
- Province: Barcelona
- Comarca: Osona

Government
  - Mayor: Josep Pujol Boladeras (2015)

Area
  - Total: 13.2 km^{2} (5.1 sq mi)

Population (2025-01-01)
  - Total: 106
  - Density: 8.03/km^{2} (20.8/sq mi)
- Website: santagustidellucanes.cat

Sant Agustí de Lluçanès (Catalan pronunciation: [ˌsantəɣusˈti ðə ʎusəˈnɛs]) is a municipality in the comarca of Osona in Catalonia, Spain.

Although the municipality lies within the natural region of Lluçanès, it voted in 2015 not to join a proposed new comarca of that name, but the plan was put on hold due to insufficient support.
