= Sobremunt =

- Municipality
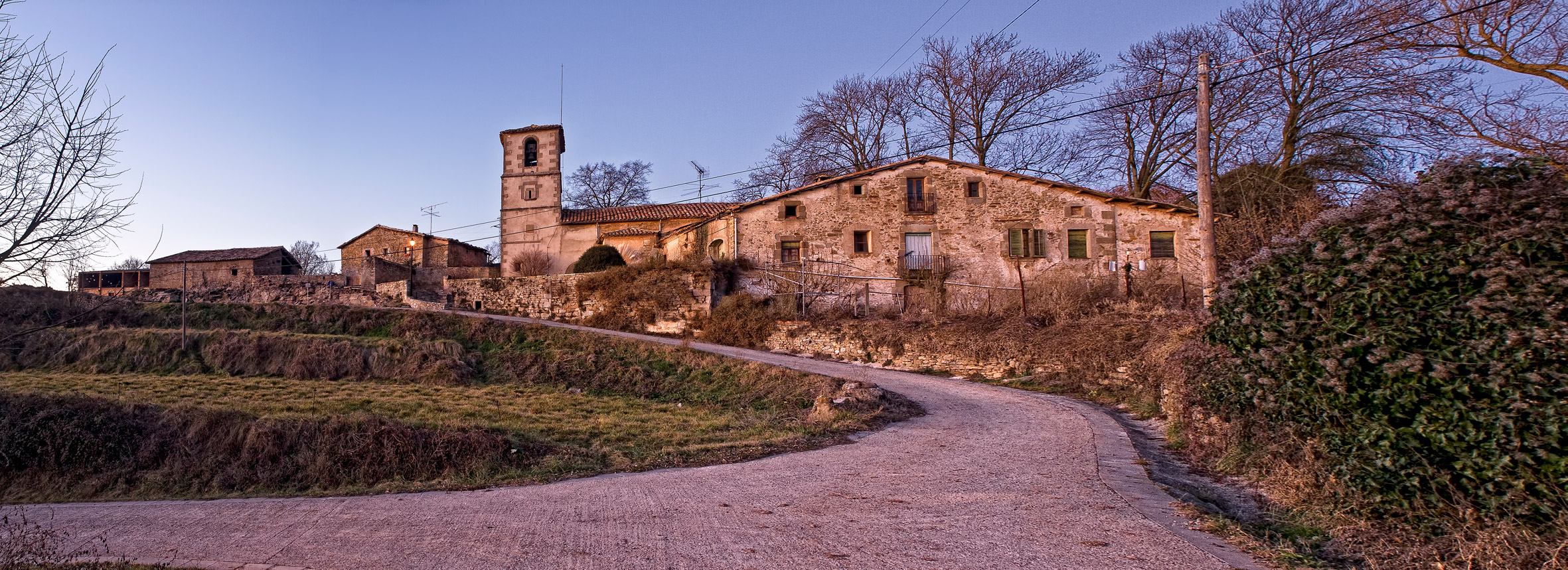
- St. Martin's church, Sobremunt

- Location in Catalonia
- Coordinates: 42°2′16″N 2°9′59″E
- Country: Spain
- Community: Catalonia
- Province: Barcelona
- Comarca: Lluçanès

Government
  - Mayor: Albert Güell Vallbona (2015)

Area
  - Total: 13.8 km^{2} (5.3 sq mi)

Population (2025-01-01)
  - Total: 90
  - Density: 6.5/km^{2} (17/sq mi)
- Website: sobremunt.cat

Sobremunt (Catalan pronunciation: [ˌsoβɾəˈmun]) is a municipality in the comarca of Lluçanès in Catalonia, Spain.

In 2015, the municipality voted to join a proposed new comarca of Lluçanès, but the plan was put on hold due to insufficient support. Formerly part of Osona, it was finally incorporated into the new Lluçanès comarca in 2023.
