= Santa Maria de Merlès =

- Municipality
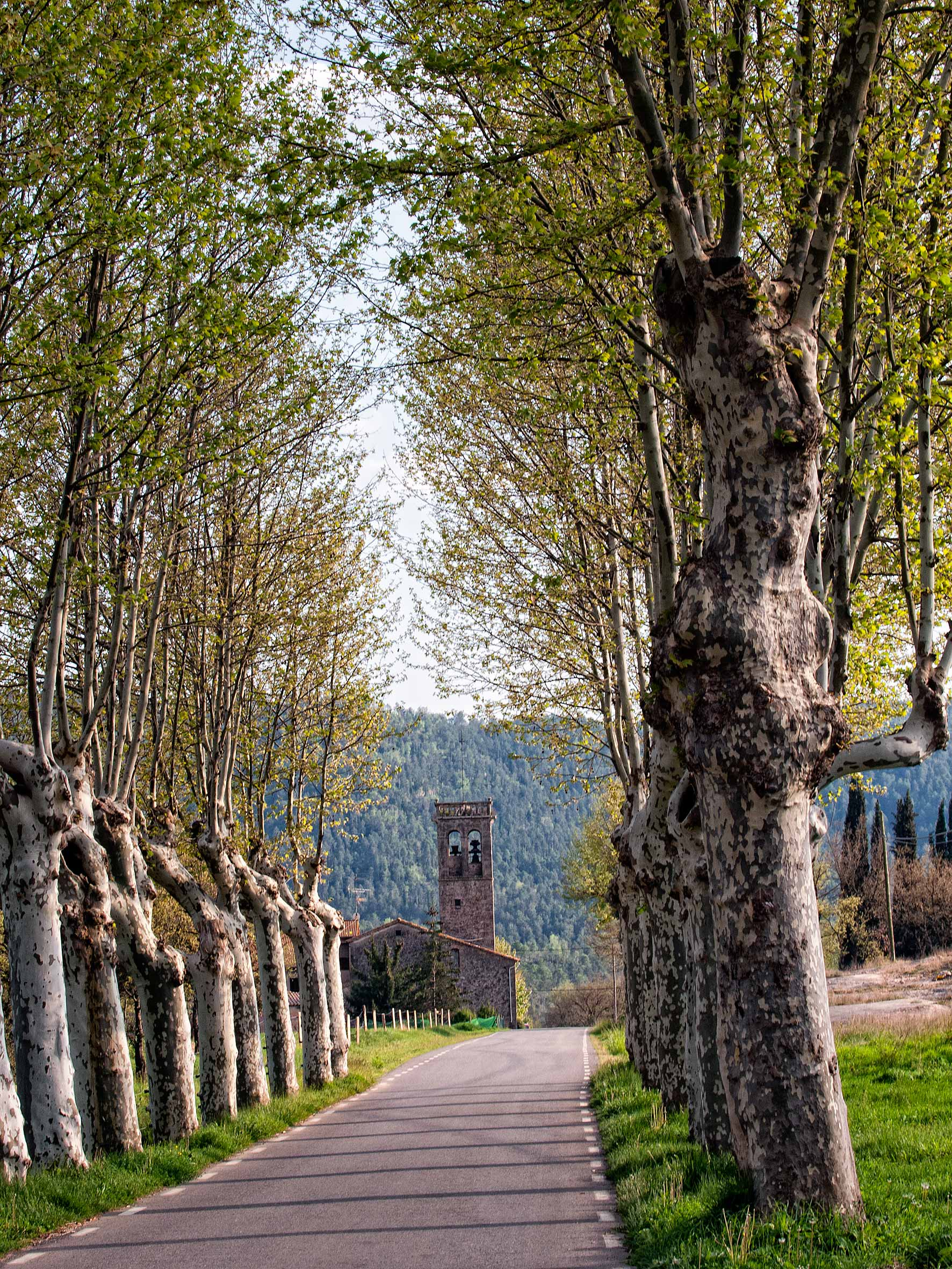
- Santa Maria de Merlés

- Coat of arms

- Location in the Province of Barcelona Location in Catalonia Location in Spain
- Coordinates: 42°0′06″N 1°58′45″E
- Country: Spain
- Community: Catalonia
- Province: Barcelona
- Comarca: Berguedà

Government
  - Mayor: Josep Costa Garet (2015) (CiU)

Area
  - Total: 52.1 km^{2} (20.1 sq mi)
- Elevation: 532 m (1,745 ft)

Population (2025-01-01)
  - Total: 179
  - Density: 3.44/km^{2} (8.90/sq mi)
- Website: santamariademerles.cat

Santa Maria de Merlès (Catalan pronunciation: [ˈsantə məˈɾi.ə ðə məɾˈlɛs]) is a municipality in Catalonia. It is officially within the comarca of Berguedà, but traditionally, it is a part of the natural comarca of Lluçanès. The municipality is located on the riera, or stream, of Merlès, from which the town takes its name. It is located about 14 kilometers east of Puig-reig, and 8 kilometers west of Prats de Lluçanès, the nearest market town.

The town is divided into two parishes, Santa Maria (in the Bishopric of Solsona) to the west of the riera, and Sant Martí (in the Bishopric of Vic) to the east.

Although the municipality lies within the natural region of Lluçanès, it voted in 2015 not to join a proposed new comarca of that name, but the plan was put on hold due to insufficient support.

== Folklore ==
The town was traditionally dominated by two important families, the Cortadas and the Vilaltas. Their monumental houses still stand in the municipality. A popular legend offers an explanation for the reconstruction of the Church of Sta. Maria in the 17th century.

An animosity developed between the two families, and in order to anger the patriarch of the Cortada household, the head of the Vilalta family sat one Sunday in the pew reserved for his rival. The patriarch of the Cortadas was so offended that he left church, only to return with a firearm. He killed the head of the Vilaltas in the church and, as a result, the building had to be torn down and rebuilt on the other side of the main road. Later, the patriarch of the Cortadas felt remorse for what he had done, and as penitence erected a chapel dedicated to Saint Mary Magdalene on his property, beside the main road.

== Town festivals ==
- Festa Major, 15 August
- Festival of Sant Pau de Pinós, Sunday nearest to 8 September
- Festival of Sant Martí, 11 November

== Sites of interest ==
- Romanesque bridge of Sant Martí
- Church of Sant Pau de Pinós, begun in the 12th century
- Church of Sant Miquel de Terradelles, from the 12th century
- Baroque church of Santa Maria de Merlès, from the 17th century
- Ruins of the Castle of Merlès, from the 12th century
- Chapel of Santa Maria Magdalena, with zoomorphic carvings
- Camadoca, a wildlife center dedicated to the native species of the Riera de Merlès. Open to visitors.
