= Perafita =

- Municipality
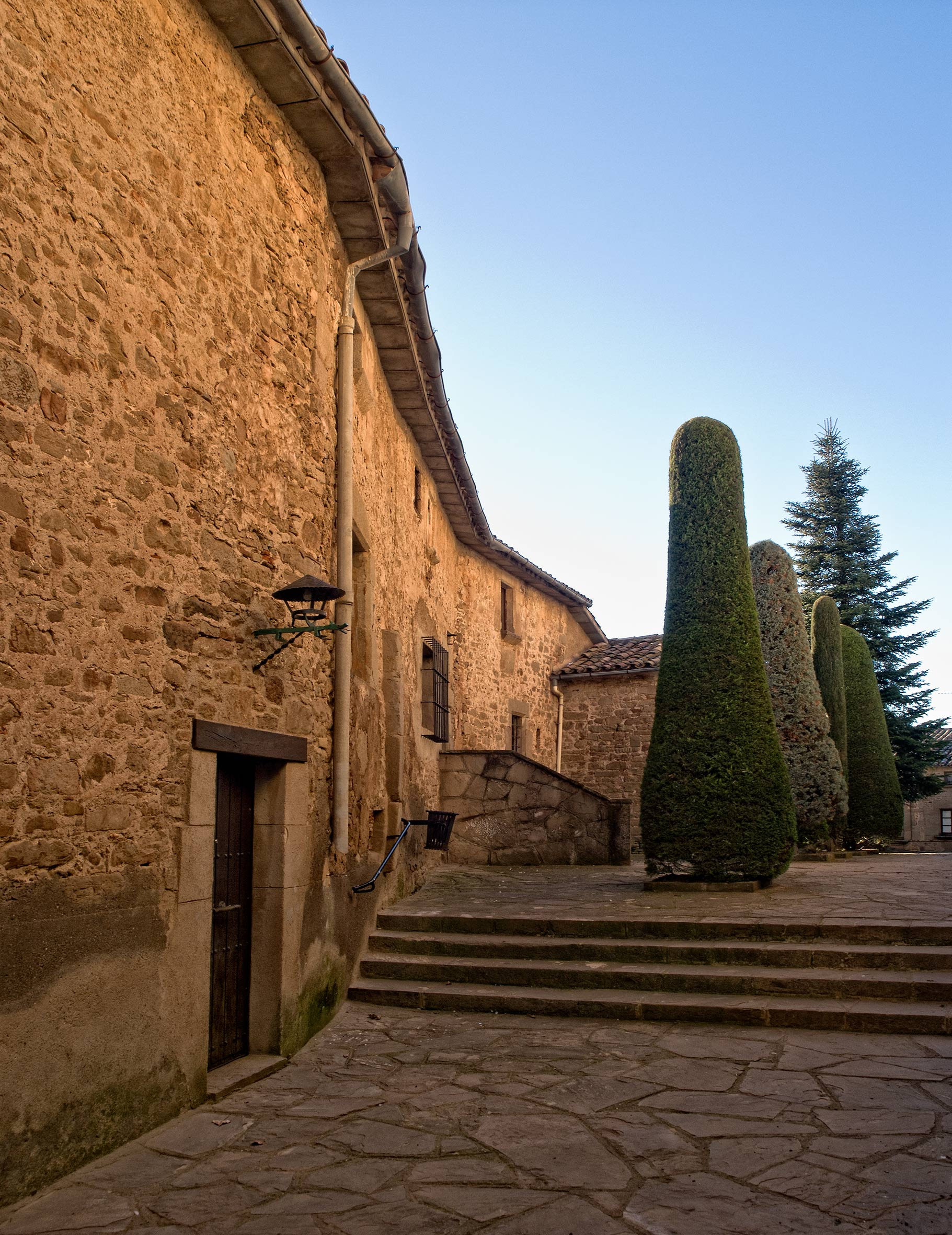
- Church Street, Perafita

- Coat of arms

- Location in Catalonia
- Coordinates: 42°2′36″N 2°6′32″E
- Country: Spain
- Community: Catalonia
- Province: Barcelona
- Comarca: Lluçanès

Government
  - Mayor: Ramon Casals Costa (2015)

Area
  - Total: 19.6 km^{2} (7.6 sq mi)

Population (2025-01-01)
  - Total: 433
  - Density: 22.1/km^{2} (57.2/sq mi)
- Website: www.perafita.cat

Perafita (Catalan pronunciation: [ˌpeɾəˈfitə]) is a municipality in the comarca of Lluçanès in Catalonia, Spain.

In 2015, the municipality voted to join a proposed new comarca of Lluçanès, but the plan was put on hold due to insufficient support. Formerly part of Osona, it was finally incorporated into the new Lluçanès comarca in 2023.
