= Oristà =

- Municipality
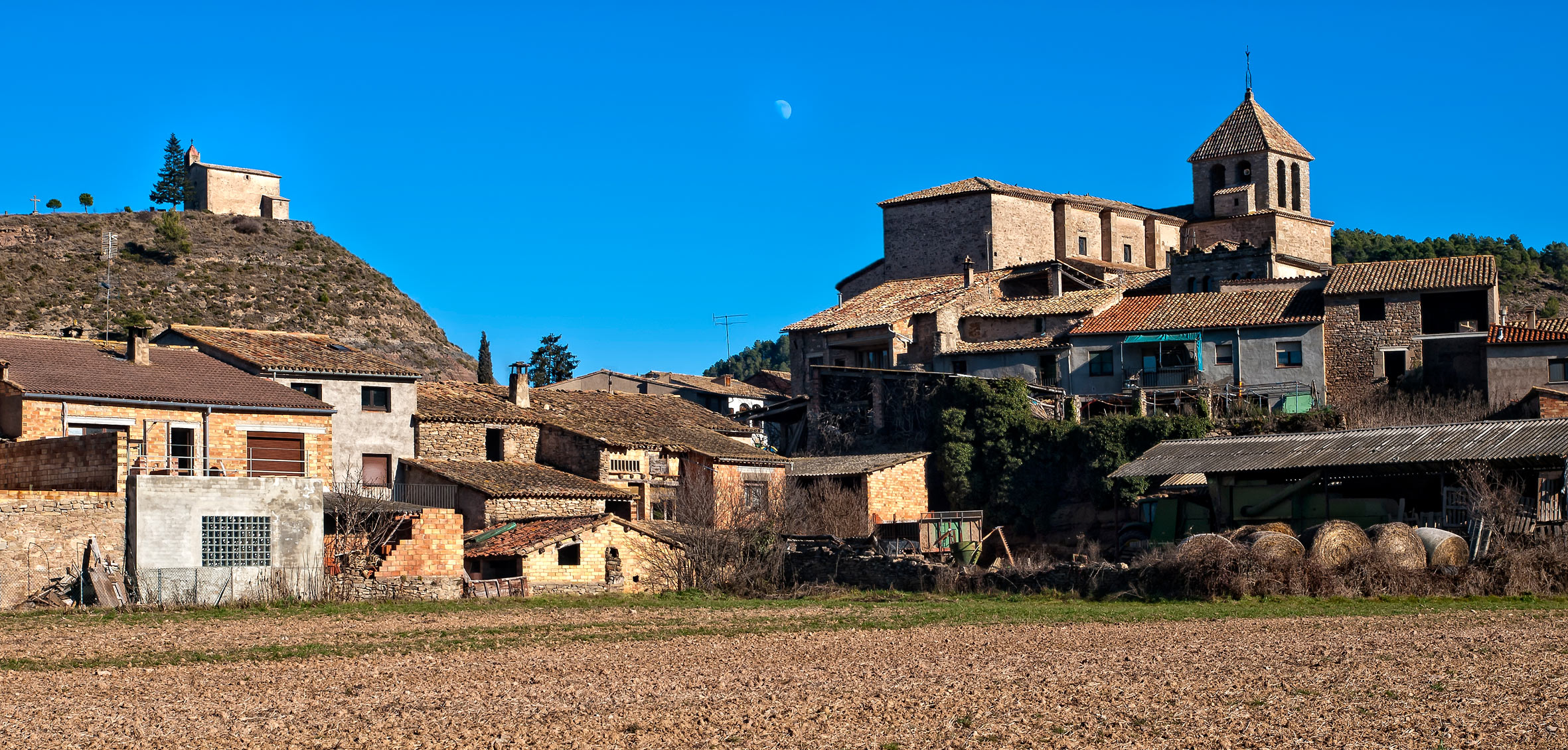
- Oristà

- Flag Coat of arms

- Location in Catalonia
- Coordinates: 41°56′5″N 2°3′43″E
- Country: Spain
- Community: Catalonia
- Province: Barcelona
- Comarca: Lluçanès

Government
  - Mayor: Marc Sucarrats Sabatés (2015)

Area
  - Total: 68.5 km^{2} (26.4 sq mi)

Population (2025-01-01)
  - Total: 555
  - Density: 8.10/km^{2} (21.0/sq mi)
- Website: www.orista.cat

Oristà (Catalan pronunciation: [uɾisˈta]) is a municipality in the comarca of Lluçanès in Catalonia, Spain. It includes an exclave within Sant Feliu Sasserra.

In 2015, the municipality voted to join a proposed new comarca of Lluçanès, but the plan was put on hold due to insufficient support. Formerly part of Osona, it was finally incorporated into the new Lluçanès comarca in 2023.
