= Lluçà =

- Municipality
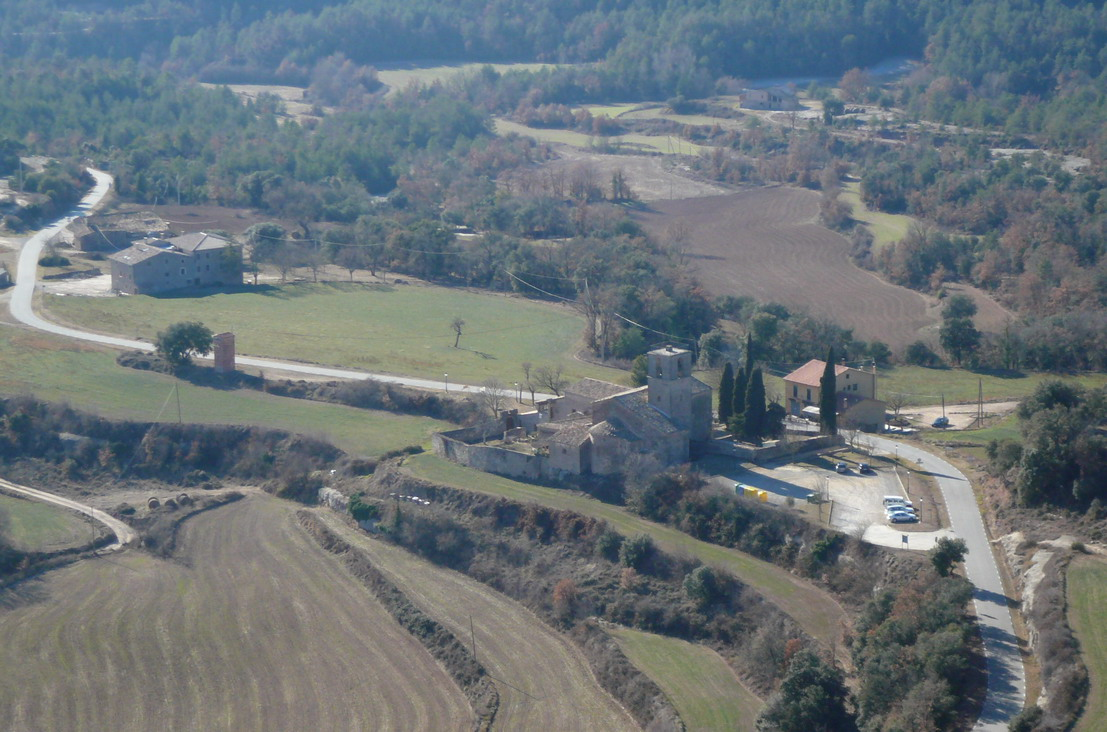
- The village of Lluçà from the castle

- Flag Coat of arms

- Location in Catalonia
- Coordinates: 42°4′0″N 2°4′25″E
- Country: Spain
- Community: Catalonia
- Province: Barcelona
- Comarca: Lluçanès
- Established: June 9, 1969

Government
  - Mayor: Joan Carles Carles Latorre (2015)

Area
  - Total: 53.0 km^{2} (20.5 sq mi)
- Elevation: 751 m (2,464 ft)

Population (2025-01-01)
  - Total: 281
  - Density: 5.30/km^{2} (13.7/sq mi)
- Demonym(s): Lluçanenc, lluçanenca
- Website: www.llusa.cat

Lluçà (Catalan pronunciation: [ʎuˈsa]) is a municipality in the comarca of Lluçanès in Catalonia, Spain. It is subdivided into the town of Santa Eulàlia de Puigoriol, and the much smaller village of Lluçà. This village, prominent because of its monastery, gives its name to the surrounding natural comarca of Lluçanès.

In 2015, the municipality voted to join a proposed new comarca of Lluçanès, but the plan was put on hold due to insufficient support. Formerly part of Osona, it was finally incorporated into the new Lluçanès comarca in 2023.

== History ==
Lluçà was part of the County of Roussillon area and governed by the Counts of Roussillon during the 6th and 7th centuries. Throughout the end of the 8th century and the middle of the twelfth century, Lluçà was governed by various Counts of Barcelona.

== Demography ==
1900	1930	1950	1970	1986	2008
613	834	677	528	299	255

== Sites of interest ==
- Remains of the Castle of Lluçà
- Romanesque hermitage of Sant Vicenç del Castell. A circular building with a hemispherical vault and small apse. Documented since 988, the present structure dates from the 11th and 12th centuries.
- Monastery of Santa Maria de Lluçà. A Romanesque church with Gothic murals.
