= Lluçanès =

Coordinates: 42°01′39″N 2°00′16″E

- Comarca
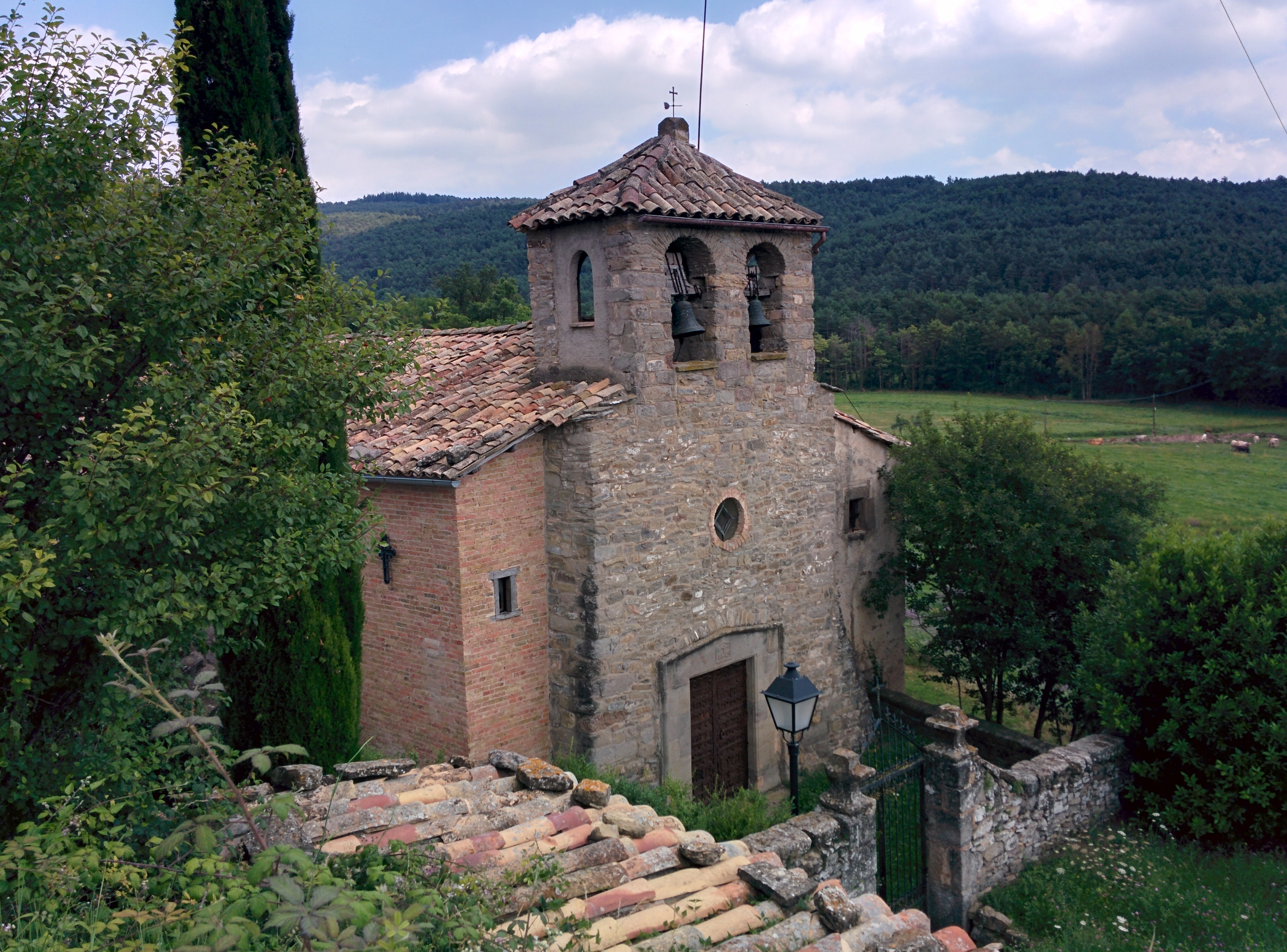
- Landscape of Lluçanès with the Sant Agustí de Lluçanès church in the foreground.

- A map of Catalonia showing the Lluçanès location
- Country: Spain
- Autonomous community: Catalonia
- Province: Barcelona
- Region: Central Catalonia
- Capital: Prats de Lluçanès

Government
  - Body: Lluçanès Comarcal Council (TBD)
  - President: N/A
- Highest elevation: 700 m (2,300 ft)
- Lowest elevation: 380 m (1,250 ft)

Lluçanès (Catalan pronunciation: [ʎusəˈnɛs]) is a comarca of Catalonia, in the central region, transitioning between the Plain of Vic and Berguedà, in the pre-Pyrenees. It was established as an official comarca in May 2023. The capital is the town of Prats de Lluçanès.

== Corresponding municipalities ==
The administrative comarca, created in May 2023, is made up of the following municipalities: Alpens, Lluçà, Olost, Oristà, Perafita, Prats de Lluçanès, Sant Martí d'Albars and Sobremunt.

=== Natural comarca ===
The natural comarca or historic region, with no administrative status, is made up of all the aforementioned municipalities including the following, all of which rejected joining the newly created comarca:

- In the comarca of Osona: Sant Agustí de Lluçanès, Sant Bartomeu del Grau, Sant Boi de Lluçanès
- In the comarca of Berguedà: Santa Maria de Merlès
- In the comarca of Bages: Sant Feliu Sasserra (formerly part of the administrative comarca itself, voted to return to Bages just after 8 weeks).

== Geography ==
Lluçanès is a plateau of about 400 km^{2}, situated in the north-east of the depressió central of Catalonia. The major waterways of the comarca include the Ter and Llobregat rivers, into which the Riera de Merlès, Riera de Lluçanès and Gavarresa feed.

The comarca has a Mediterranean climate transitioning to continental. It has a median temperature of about 12 degrees Celsius, and receives an annual precipitation of between 600 and 900 liters.

== Education ==
Most villages have their own infant and primary schools. The high school responsible for the secondary education is the Castell del Quer Institute.

== New comarca proposal ==
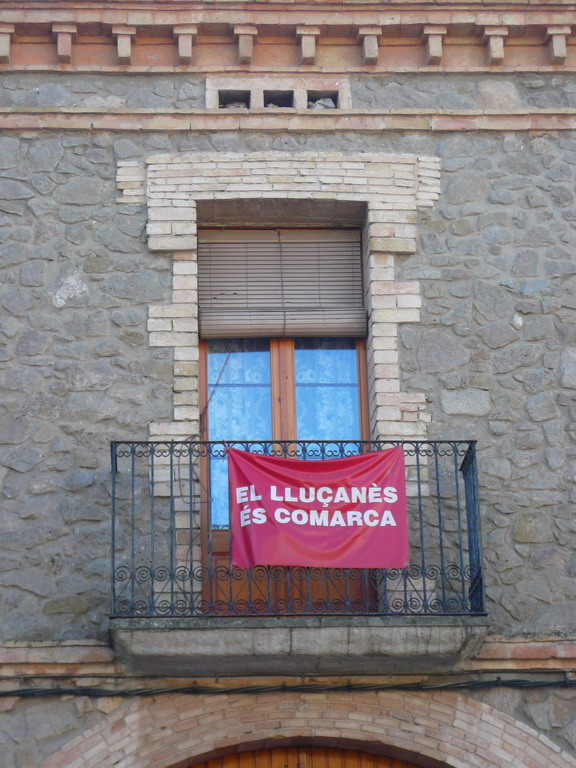
Banner in Prats de Lluçanès in 2007, claiming Lluçanès as a comarca

In the Report on the revision of Catalonia's territorial organisation model of 2000, known as the Roca Report, commissioned by the Catalan government, it was recommended that Lluçanès should become a sub-comarca of Osona. However, following a local campaign for full comarca status, a non-binding referendum was held in the region in July 2015, in which a majority in each of the municipalities of Alpens, Lluçà, Olost, Oristà, Perafita, Prats del Lluçanès, Sant Martí d'Albars, and Sobremunt, which were all in Osona at the time, voted to join a new full comarca, while the other five municipalities voted to remain in their existing comarcas. Several local and national officials expressed disappointment at the result which excludes regions strongly associated with Lluçanès from the proposed new comarca, and called for discussions on ways to resolve the issue, including a repeat of the vote.

== See also ==
- Moianès - a neighbouring region which became a new comarca earlier in 2015
