= Pic d'Eina =

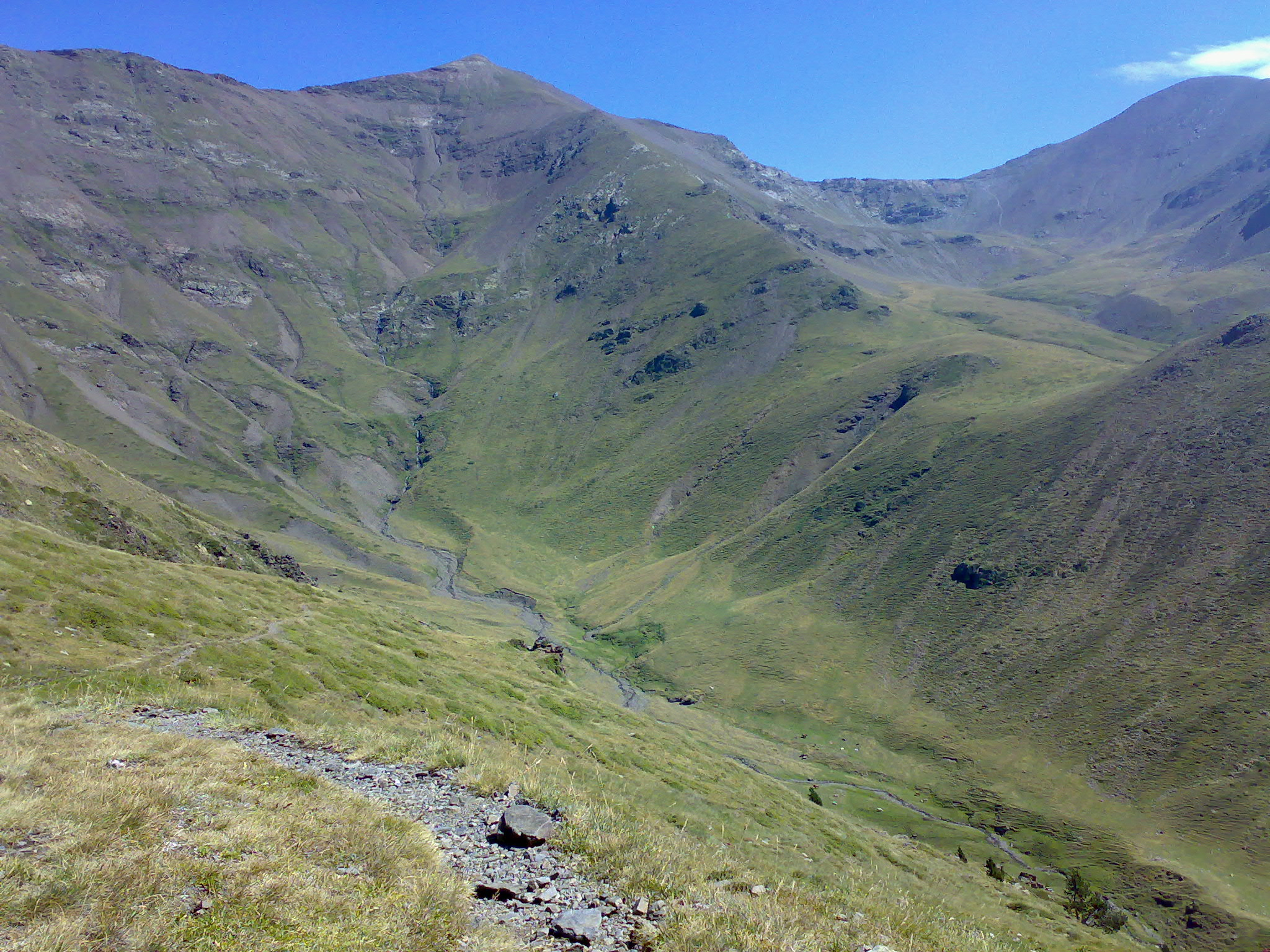

Highest point
- Elevation: 2,789 m (9,150 ft)
- Listing: Mountains of Catalonia
- Coordinates: 42°25′25″N 2°09′25″E

Geography
- Location within Pyrenees
- Location: Catalonia, Spain
- Parent range: Pyrenees

Pic d'Eina is a mountain in Catalonia, Spain. Located in the Pyrenees, it has an altitude of 2,789 metres (9,150 ft) above sea level.
