= Serra Cavallera =

Coordinates: 42.2843°N 2.2540°E

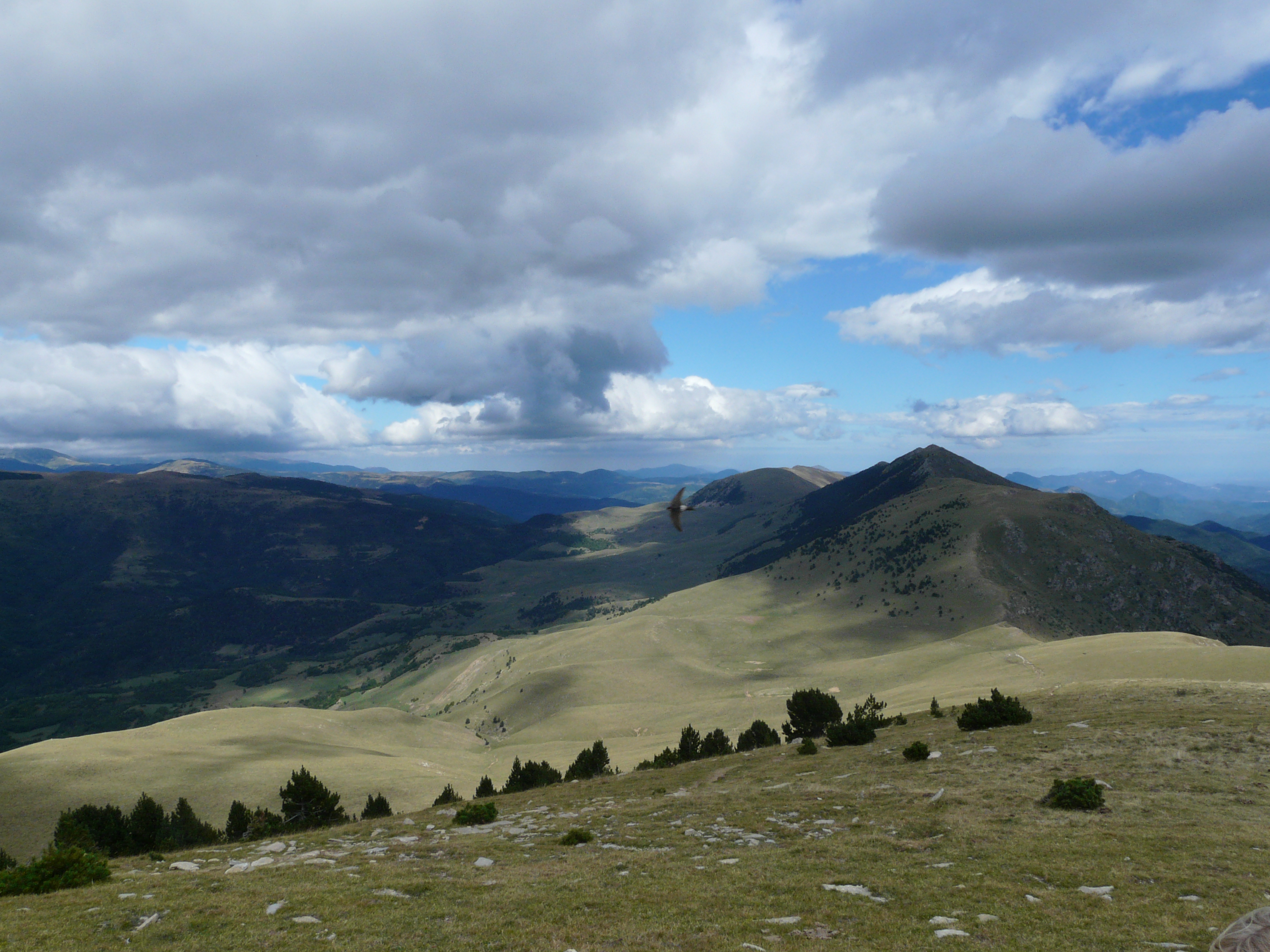
Serra Cavallera

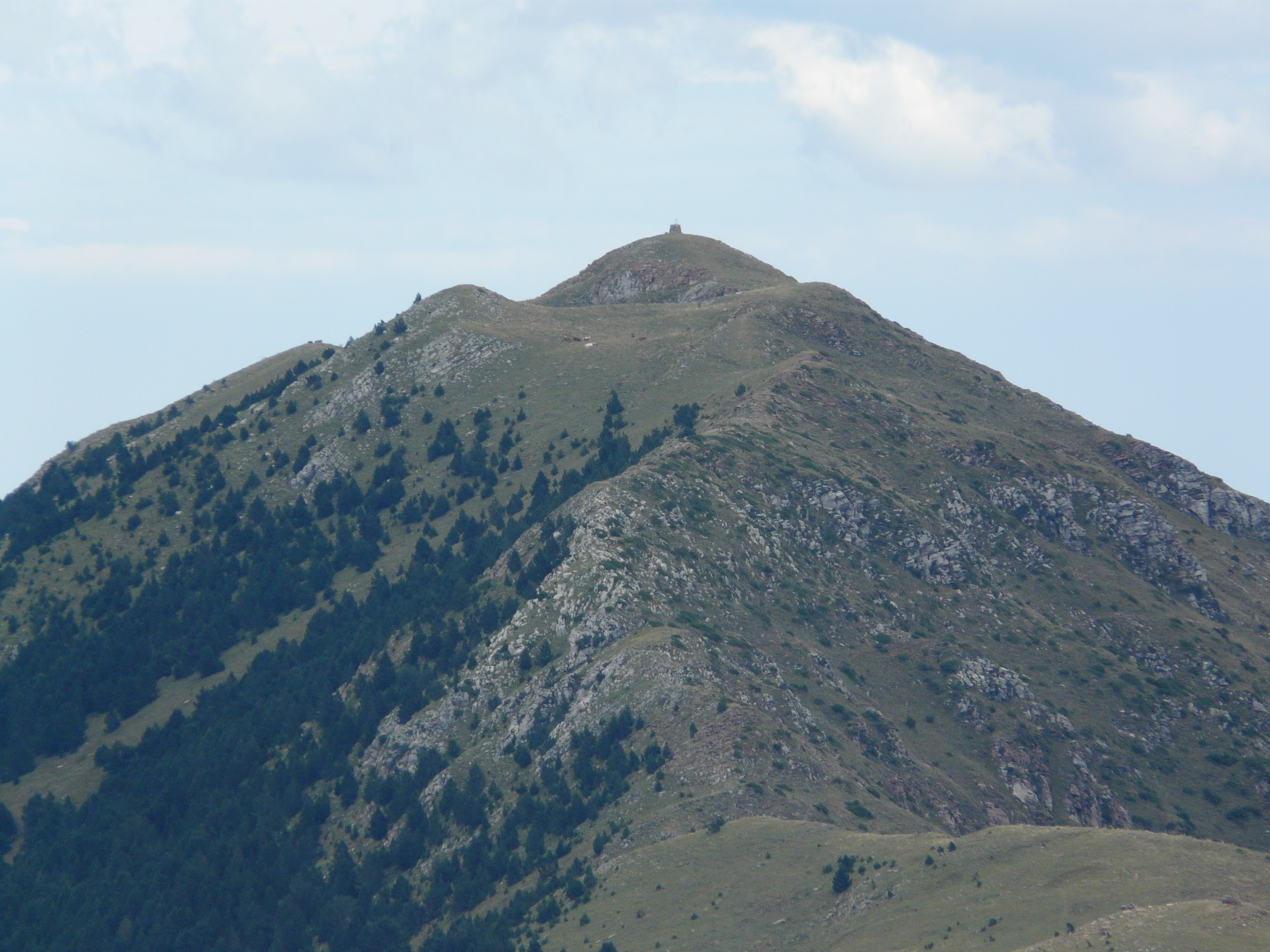
Puig (or mount) Estela, the highest peak

Serra Cavallera is a mountain range within Girona near Pardines and Ribes de Freser. It lies west of the ca:Serra de Montgrony.
