= Pic de l'Infern =

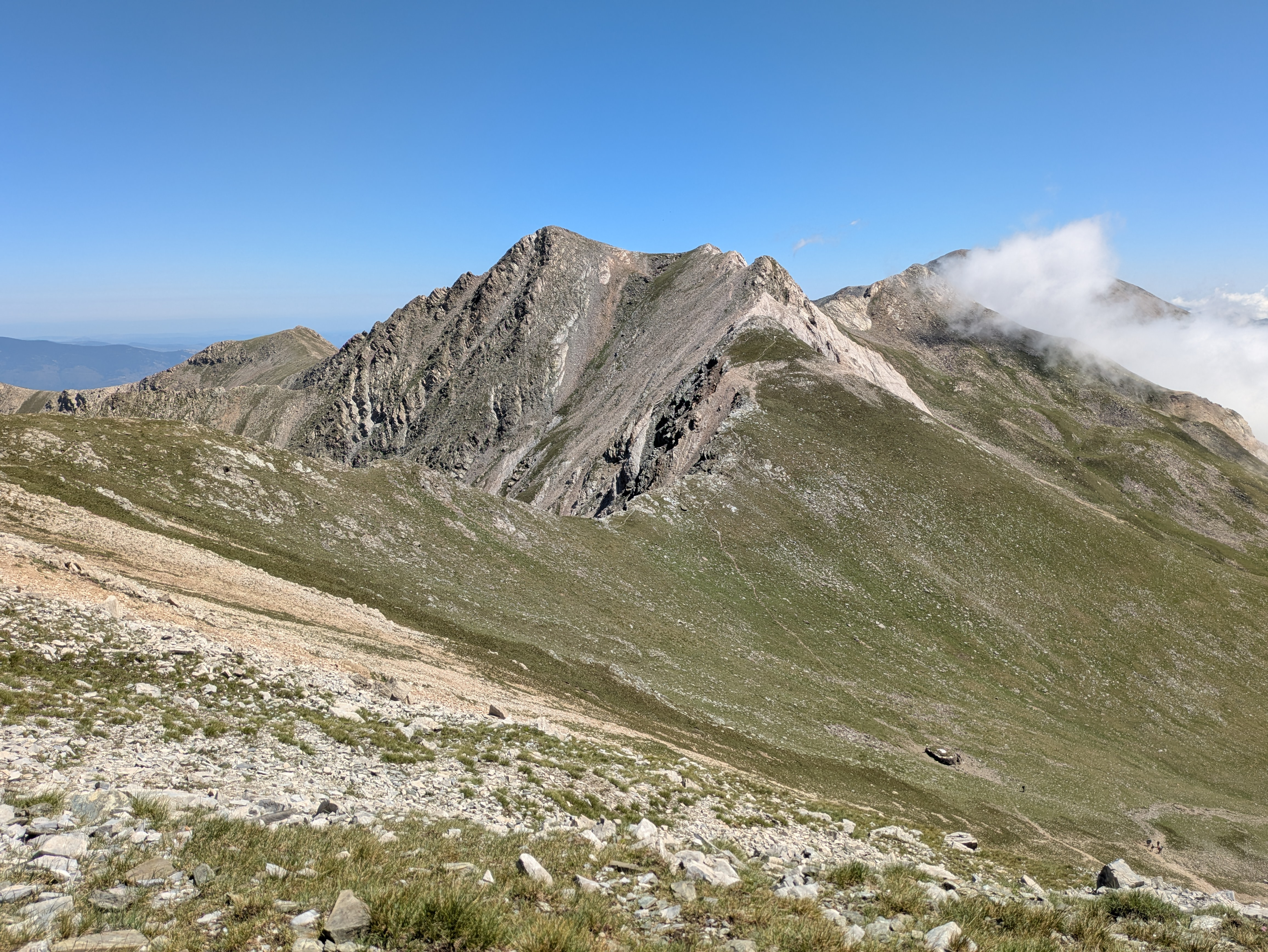
- Pic de l'Infern, from the head of the Freser valley.

Highest point
- Elevation: 2,859 m (9,380 ft)
- Coordinates: 42°25′26″N 2°12′50″E

Geography
- Location within Pyrenees
- Location: Catalonia, Spain
- Parent range: Pyrenees

Pic de l'Infern is a mountain of France. Located in the Pyrenees, it has an elevation of 2,859 metres above sea level.

The mountain is located close to the France-Spain frontier, near the head of the Freser valley, Catalonia.

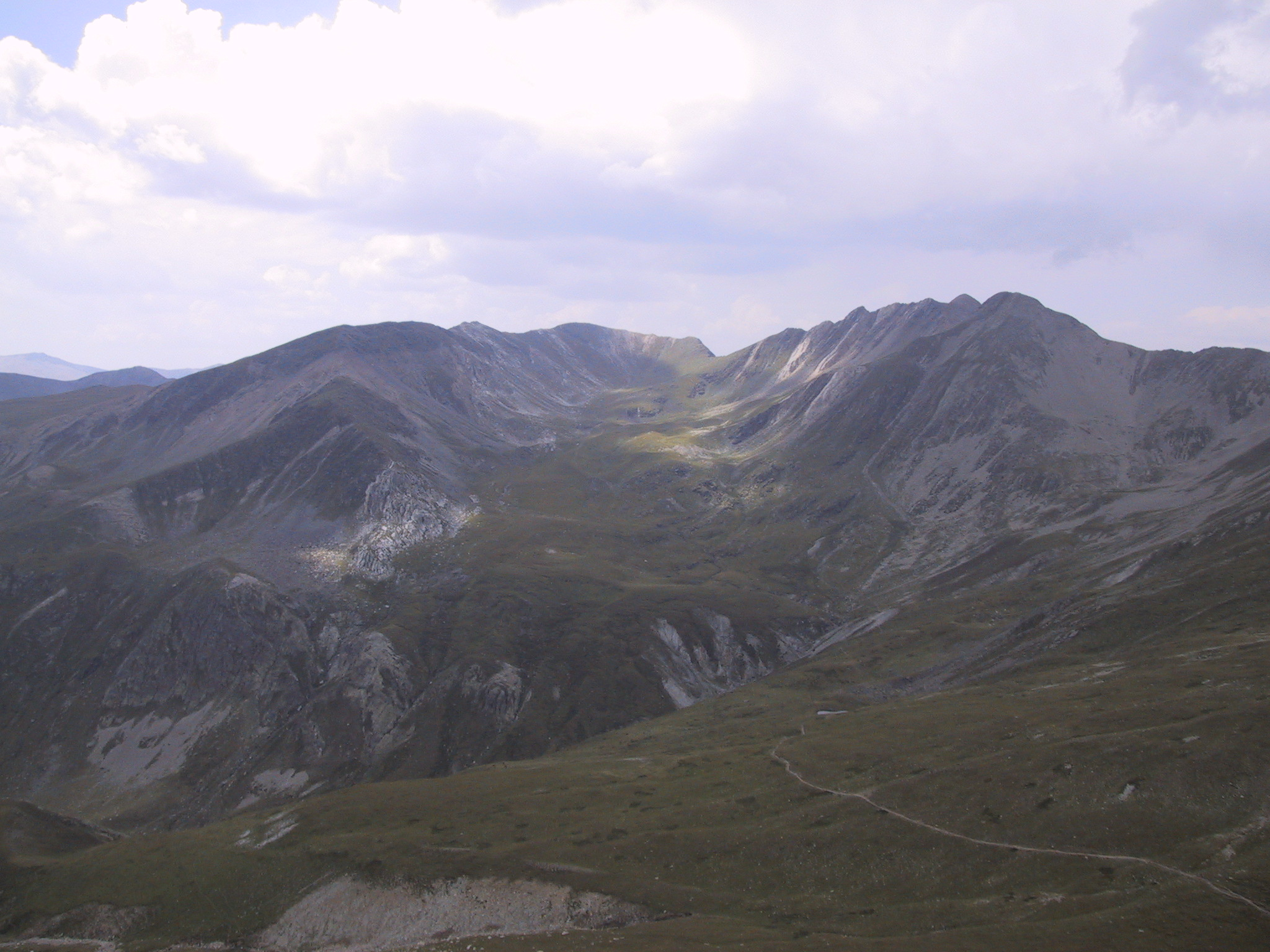
View from the Coll de la Marrana pass towards the head of the Freser valley.

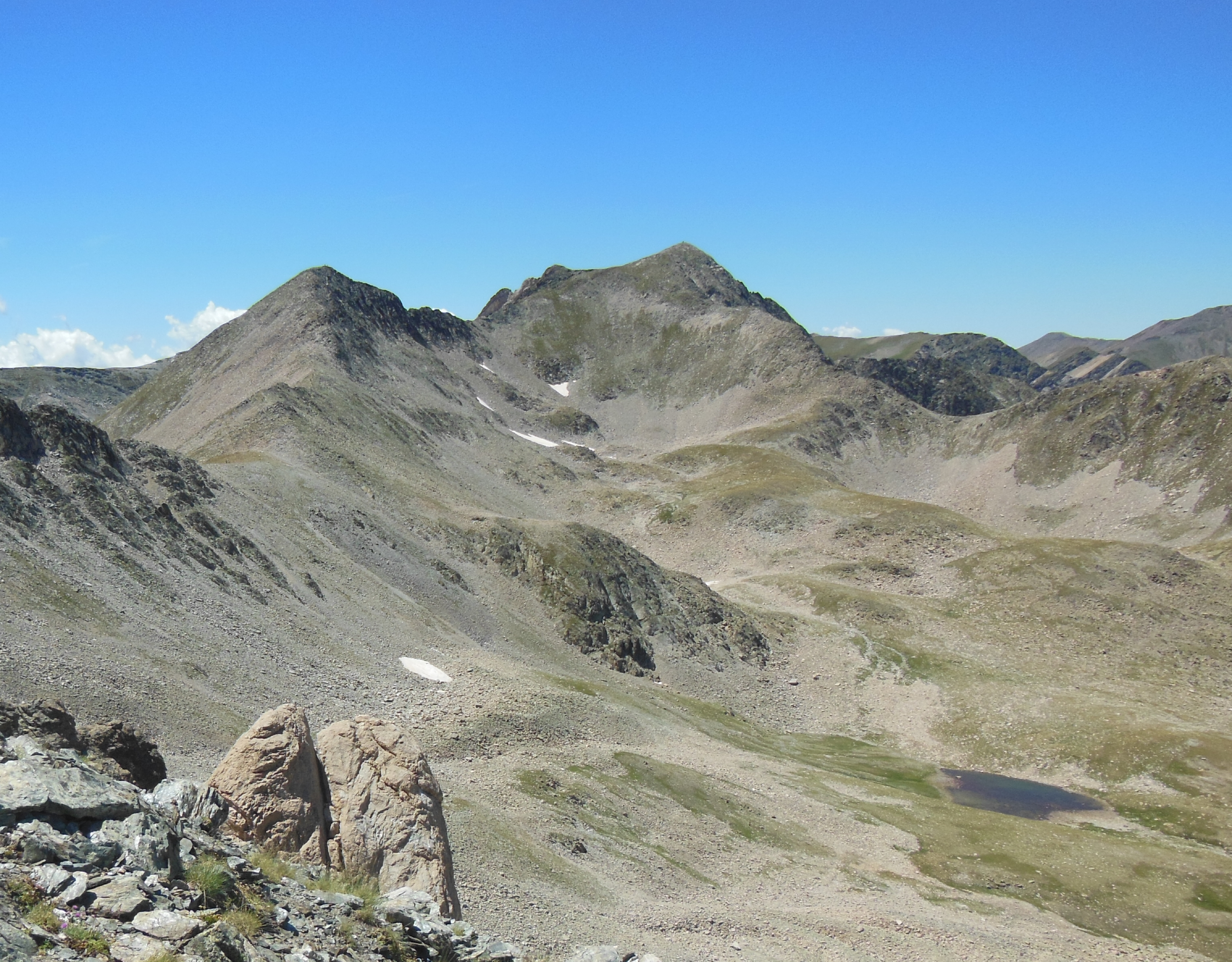
View looking west towards the Pic de l'Infern.

== See also ==
- Mountains of Catalonia
