= Turó de la Creu de Gurb =

Coordinates: 41°57′08″N 2°12′38″E

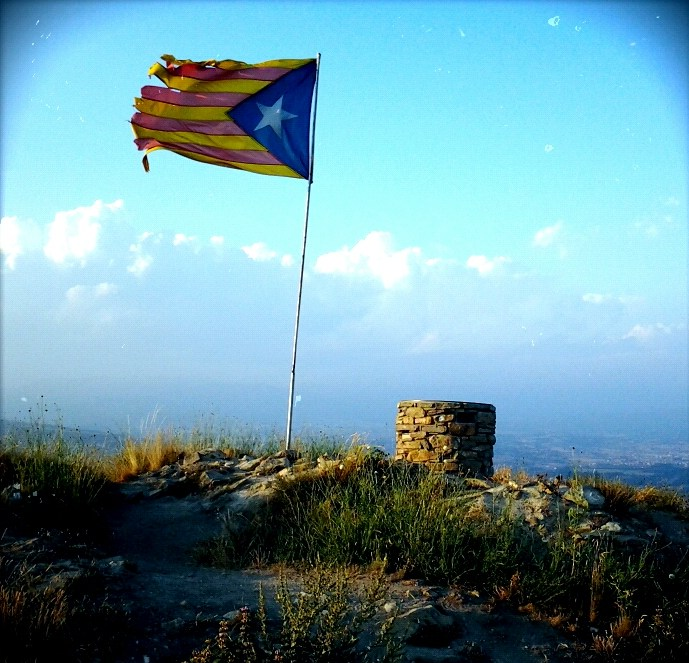

Highest point
- Elevation: 841 m (2,759 ft)

Geography
- Location: Catalonia, Spain

Turó de la Creu de Gurb is a mountain of Catalonia, Spain. It has an elevation of 841 metres above sea level.

== See also ==
- Mountains of Catalonia
