= Milany =

Mountain in Catalonia, Spain

Coordinates: 42°09′56″N 2°17′23″E

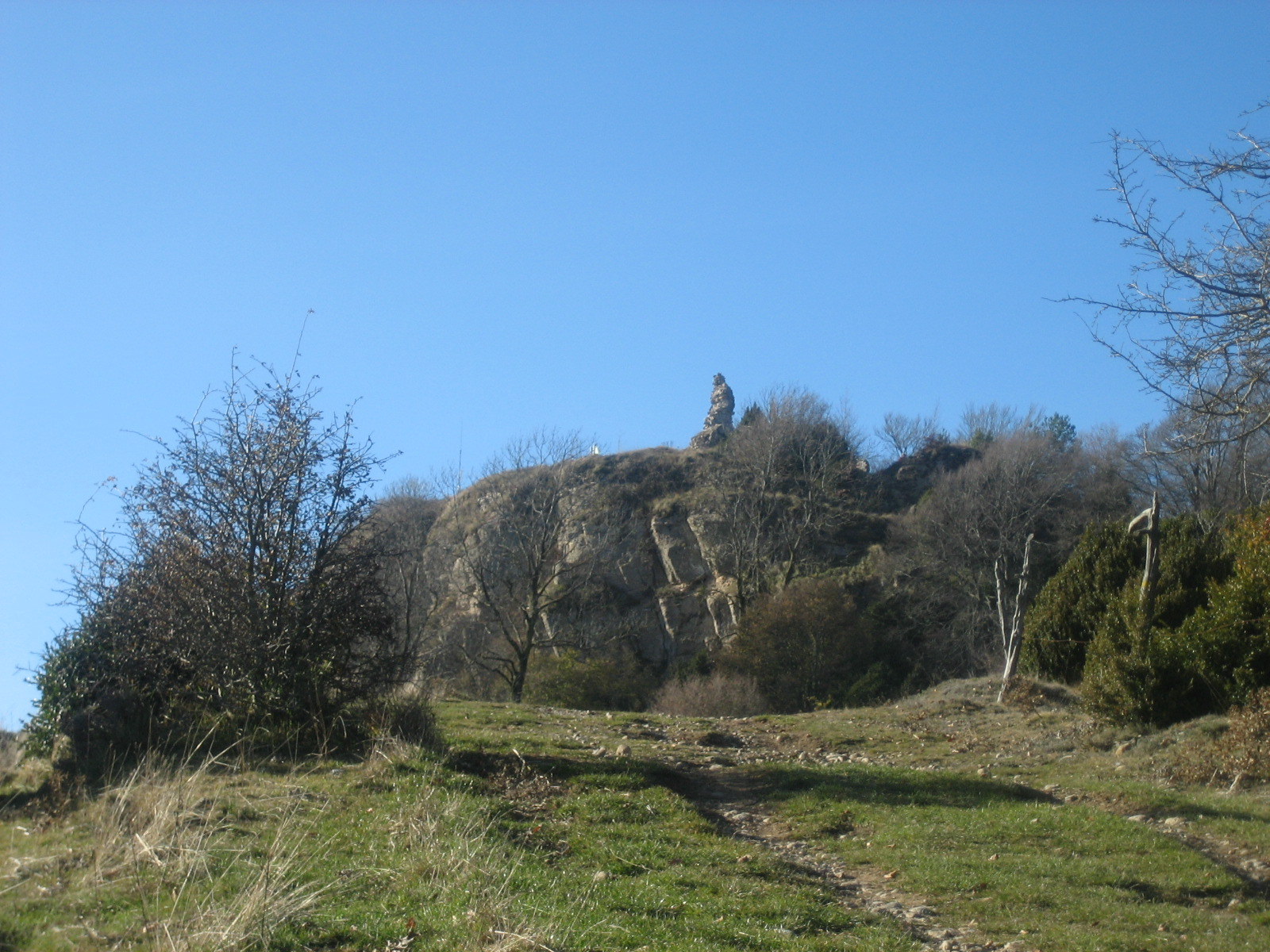
- Castle ruins on the Milany mountain

Highest point
- Elevation: 1,533 m (5,030 ft)

Geography
- Location: Catalonia, Spain

Milany is a mountain of Catalonia, Spain. It has an elevation of 1,533 metres above sea level.

== See also ==
- Mountains of Catalonia
