= Anna Andreu =

Spanish singer and songwriter (born 1988)

- Andreu in 2022

Background information
- Born: 1988 (age 37–38); Sant Quirze del Vallès, Spain
- Genre: Folk-pop
- Occupations: Singer; guitarist; composer
- Instruments: Vocals; guitar
- Label: Hidden Track Records
- Formerly of: Cálido Home

Anna Andreu (born 1988) is a Spanish folk-pop singer, guitarist and composer. She has released three studio albums Els mals costums (2020), La mida (2022), and Vigília (2025). She was also a member of the musical duo Cálido Home.

== Biography ==
Andreu was born in Sant Quirze del Vallès in 1988. She has a degree in psychology from the Autonomous University of Barcelona. She began her solo career in 2020, after being a member of the musical duo Cálido Home.

Throughout her career, Andreu has collaborated with multi-instrumentalist Marina Arrufat and producer Jordi Matas.

In 2023, Andreu received the Enderrock Award for best singer-songwriter album for her second studio album La mida. For that same album, a year earlier, she was awarded the Popular Music Prize at the II Los Tiempos Arts Awards. In 2025, she received a Premis Núvol for her third studio album Vigília.

Andreu's musical influences include Big Thief, Aldous Harding and Paco Ibañez.

== Personal life ==
Andreu is openly lesbian. Since 2017, she is in a relationship with Marina Arrufat, with whom she has a child.

== Discography ==
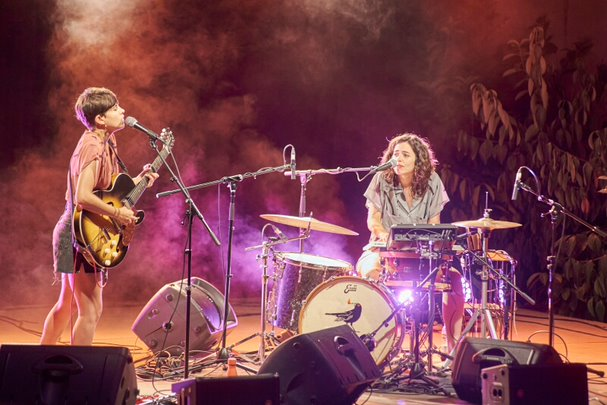
Anna Andreu and Marina Arrufat in concert in 2022.

=== Studio albums ===
List of studio albums, with selected details
Title	Details
Els mals costums	Released: 17 April 2020; Label: Hidden Track; Formats: CD, Digital download, streaming
La mida	Released: 25 March 2022; Label: Hidden Track; Formats: CD, Digital download, streaming
Vigília	Released: 14 February 2025; Label: Hidden Track; Formats: CD, Digital download, streaming

=== Singles and EPs ===
- Un revés (from Netflix series The Girl in the Mirror) (2022)
- La certesa (2022)
- Gem (2020)
- La canción del jinete (2020)
- Torrent sanguini (2020)
