= Cabrera (Santa Maria de Corcó) =

Mountain in Spain

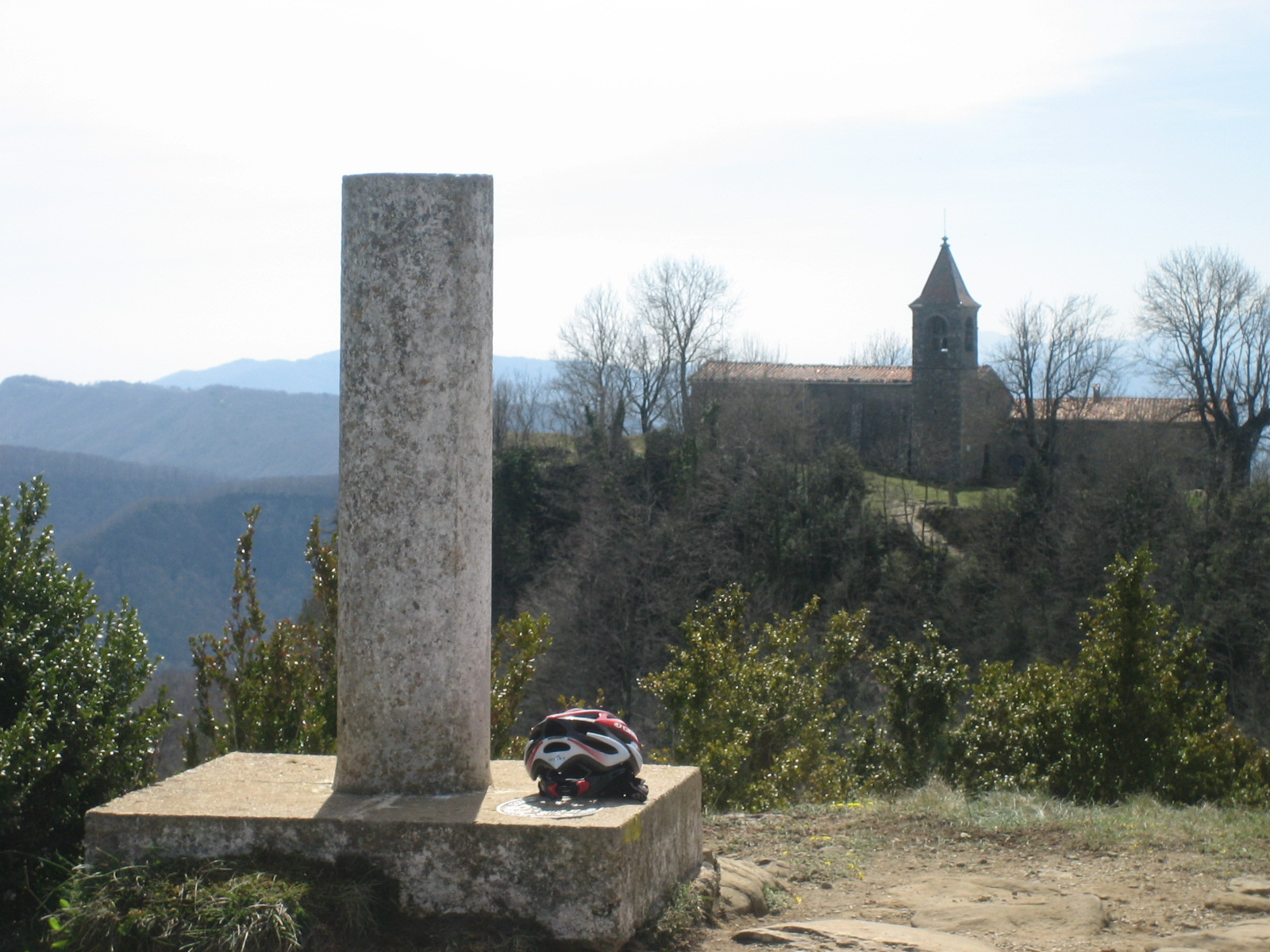
- Vertex and sanctuary of Cabrera.

Highest point
- Elevation: 1,307 m (4,288 ft)
- Listing: Mountains of Catalonia
- Coordinates: 42°04′34″N 2°24′26″E

Geography
- Location within Catalonia
- Location: Catalonia, Spain

Cabrera is a mountain in Catalonia, Spain. It has an elevation of 1,307 metres above sea level.
