= Llobregat =

Second longest river in Catalonia, Spain

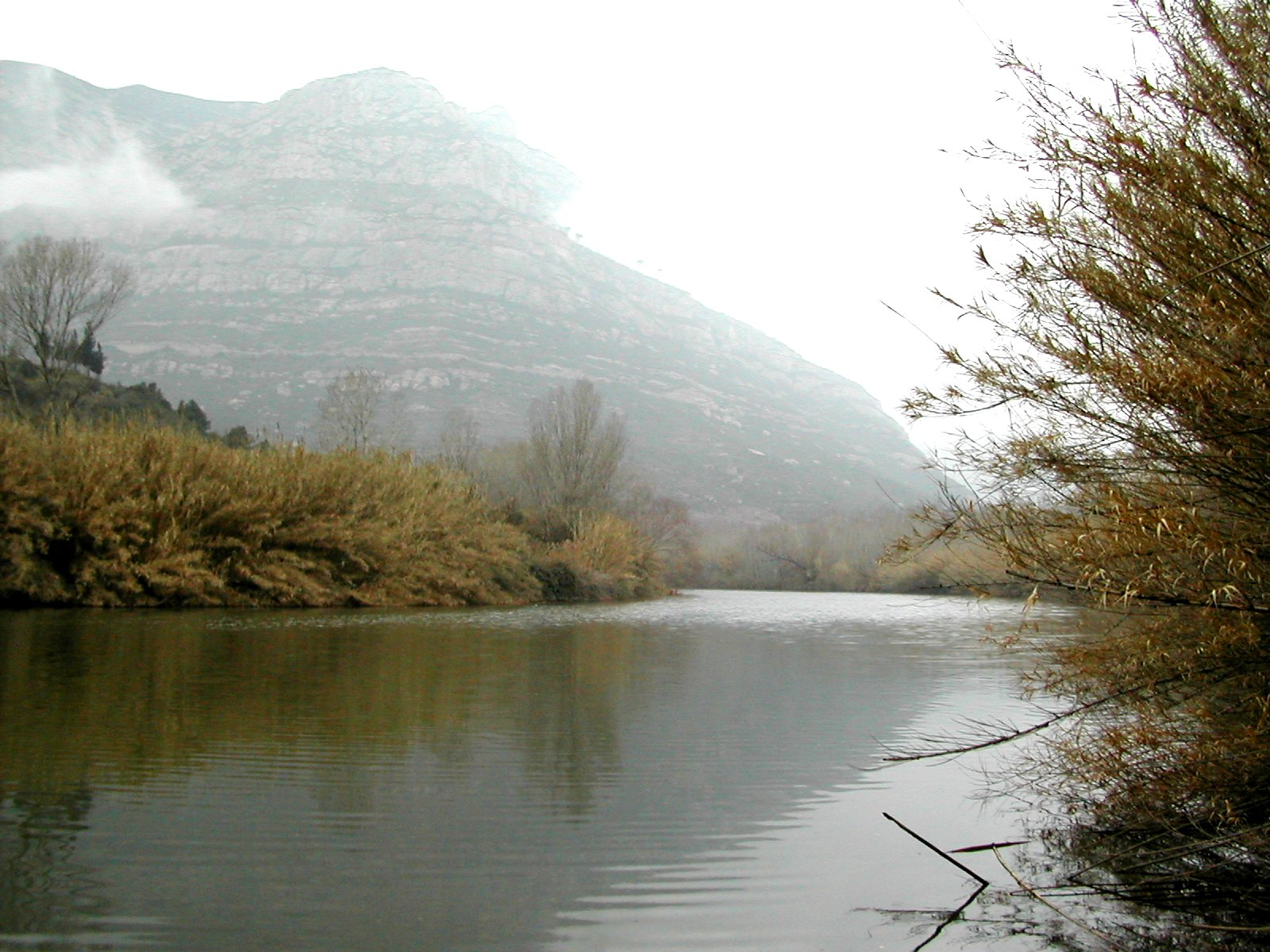
- View of the Llobregat River in Olesa de Montserrat

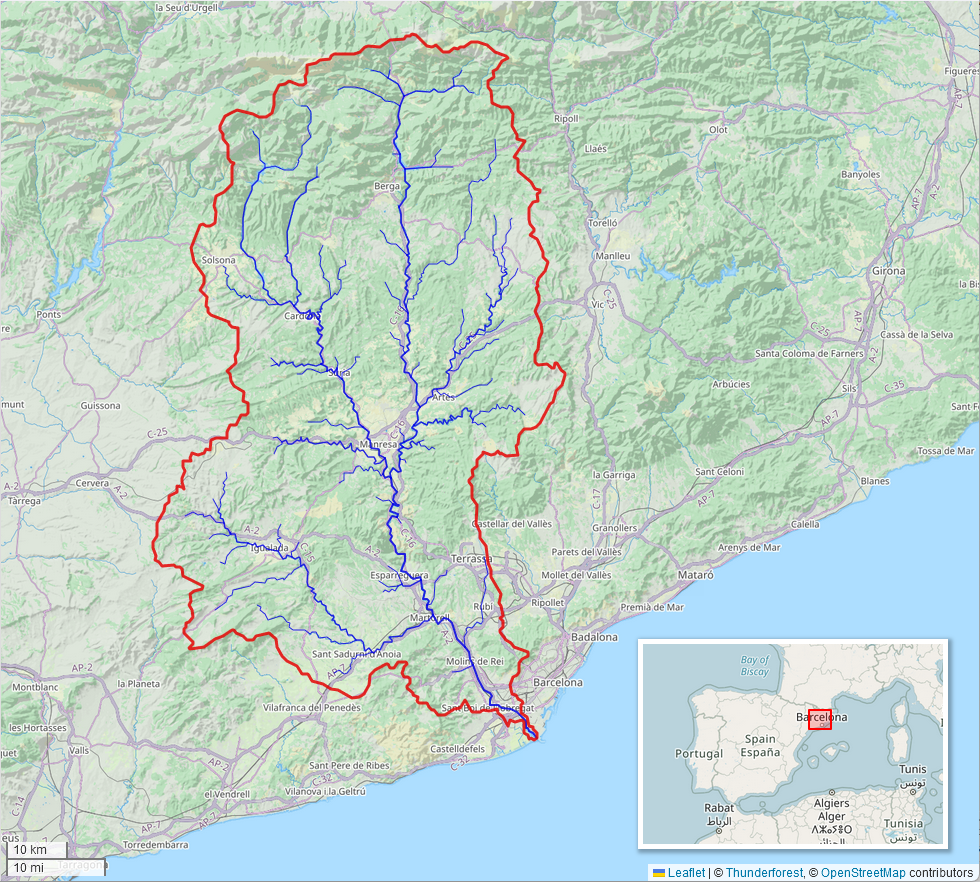
- Llobregat Watershed (Interactive map)

Location
- Country: Spain
- Province: Barcelona

Physical characteristics
- Source
  - location: Serra del Cadí
  - elevation: 1,259 m (4,131 ft)
- Mouth
  - location: Mediterranean Sea
  - coordinates: 41°17′53″N 2°08′17″E
  - elevation: 0 m (0 ft)
- Length: 170 km (110 mi)
- Basin size: 4,900 km^{2} (1,900 sq mi)
- Discharge
  - average: 20.77 m^{3}/s (733 cu ft/s)

Basin features
- Tributaries
  - left: Riera de Merlès, Riera Gavarresa, Riera de Rubí, Riera de Vallvidrera
  - right: Bastareny, Cardener, Anoia

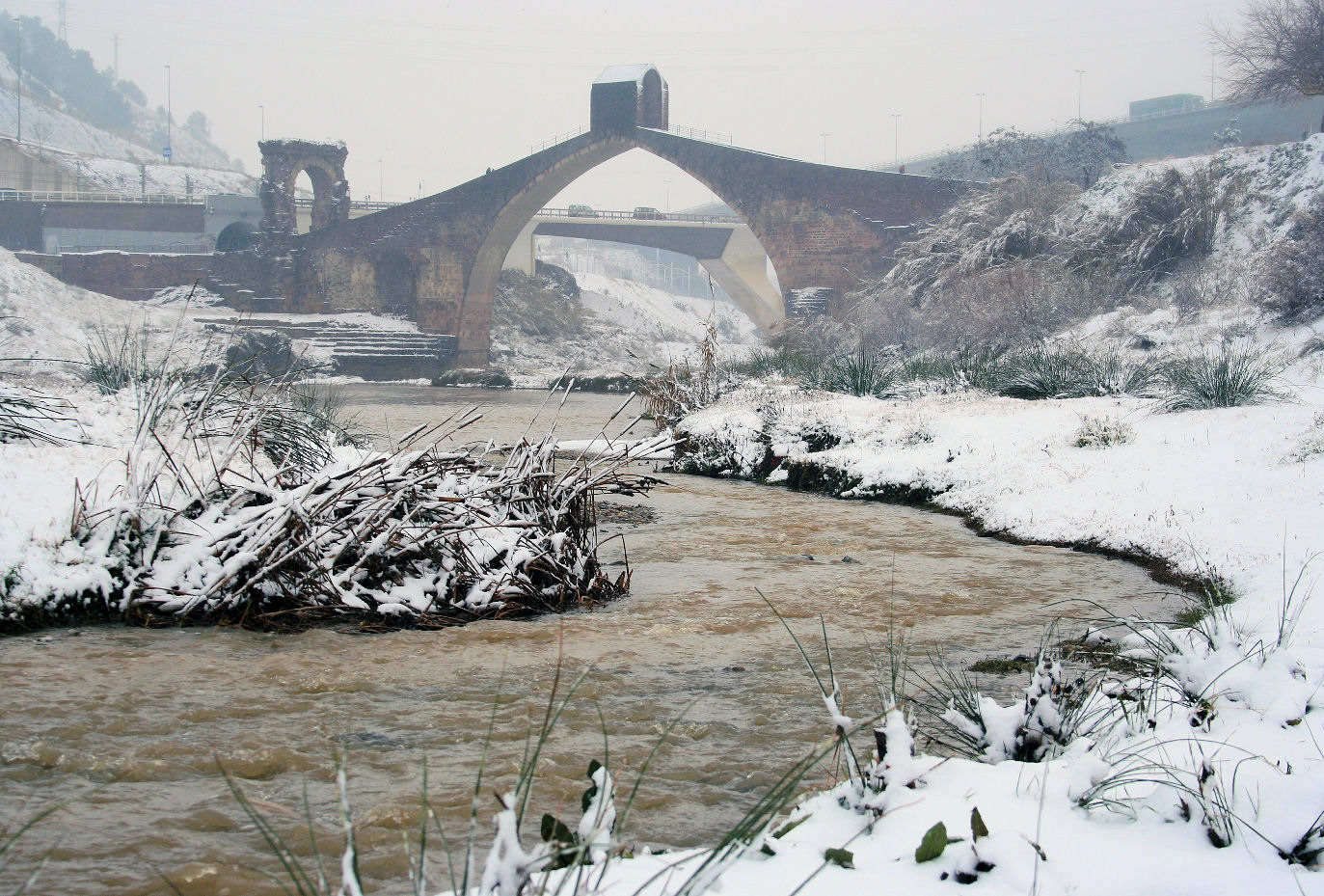
Pont del Diable over the Llobregat in Martorell

The Llobregat (Catalan pronunciation: [ʎuβɾəˈɣat], Spanish: [ʎoβɾeˈɣat]) is the second longest river in Catalonia, Spain, after the Ter. It flows into the Mediterranean south of the city of Barcelona. Its name could have originated in an ancient Latin word meaning 'dark', 'muddy' or 'slippery', or simply from its ancient name Rubricatus, literally 'red'.

== Course ==
The Llobregat originates at an elevation of 1,259 metres (4,131 ft) in the Serra del Cadí, within the limits of Castellar de n'Hug municipality, Berguedà comarca. The total length of the river is over 170 kilometres (110 mi). At Martorell, the Roman Via Augusta crosses the river on the Devil's Bridge, which dates from the High Middle Ages in its current form. The C-16 highway is also known as the 'Llobregat Axis' (Catalan: Eix del Llobregat) for its largest stretch follows the valley of the Llobregat.

The river ends in the Mediterranean Sea forming the Llobregat Delta, in the municipality of El Prat de Llobregat, near Barcelona on the left bank. The delta provided a large extension of fertile land close to the city of Barcelona, but is now largely paved, urbanized and covered by infrastructure such as the Barcelona–El Prat international Airport.

The Llobregat is heavily managed in its lower course and water that was previously lost to the sea is now pumped upstream to increase the natural flow, recharge the river delta wetlands and control seawater incursion.

== Tributaries ==
The main tributaries of the Llobregat are:

- Right tributaries:
  - Bastareny
  - Cardener
  - Anoia
- Left tributaries:
  - Riera de Merlès
  - Riera Gavarresa
  - Riera de Rubí
  - Riera de Vallvidrera, also known as la Rierada

== See also ==
- List of rivers of Spain
- Baix Llobregat
- Besòs (river)
