= Prats de Lluçanès =

- Municipality
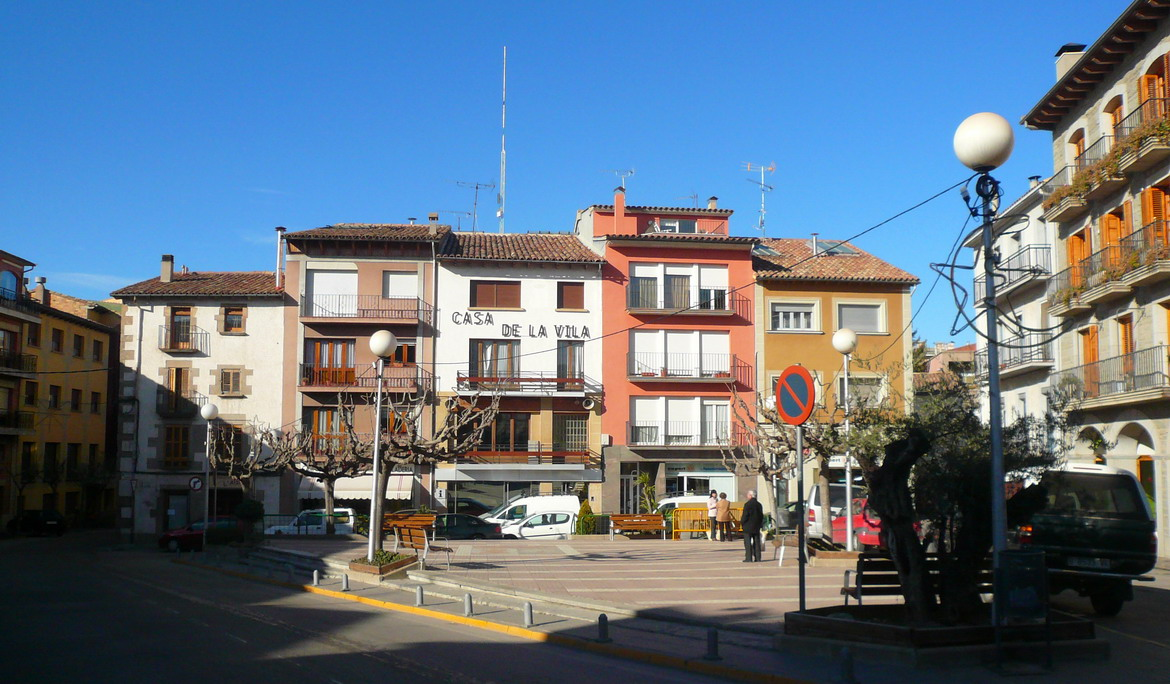

- Flag Coat of arms

- Location in the Province of Barcelona Location in Catalonia Location in Spain
- Coordinates: 42°00′39″N 2°01′51″E
- Country: Spain
- Community: Catalonia
- Province: Barcelona
- Comarca: Lluçanès

Government
  - Mayor: Jordi Bruch i Franch (2019) (Together for Catalonia)

Area
  - Total: 13.8 km^{2} (5.3 sq mi)
- Elevation: 707 m (2,320 ft)

Population (2025-01-01)
  - Total: 2,761
  - Density: 200/km^{2} (518/sq mi)
- Demonym(s): Pradenc, pradenca
- Website: www.pratsdellucanes.cat

Prats de Lluçanès (Catalan pronunciation: [ˈpɾadz ðə ʎusəˈnɛs]) is a municipality in the comarca of Lluçanès in Catalonia, Spain. It is situated in the west of the comarca, on a plain between the Lluçanès and Merlès rivers, and is served by the C-154 road between Vic and Gironella.

In 2015, the municipality voted to join a proposed new comarca of Lluçanès, of which it would be the capital, but the plan was put on hold due to insufficient support. Formerly part of Osona, it was finally incorporated into the new Lluçanès comarca in 2023, since then it has served as its capital.

== Demography ==
1900	1930	1950	1970	1986	2007
1469	1563	1740	1805	2470	2709
