= Montes de Toledo =

Systems of mountain ranges in the Iberian Peninsula

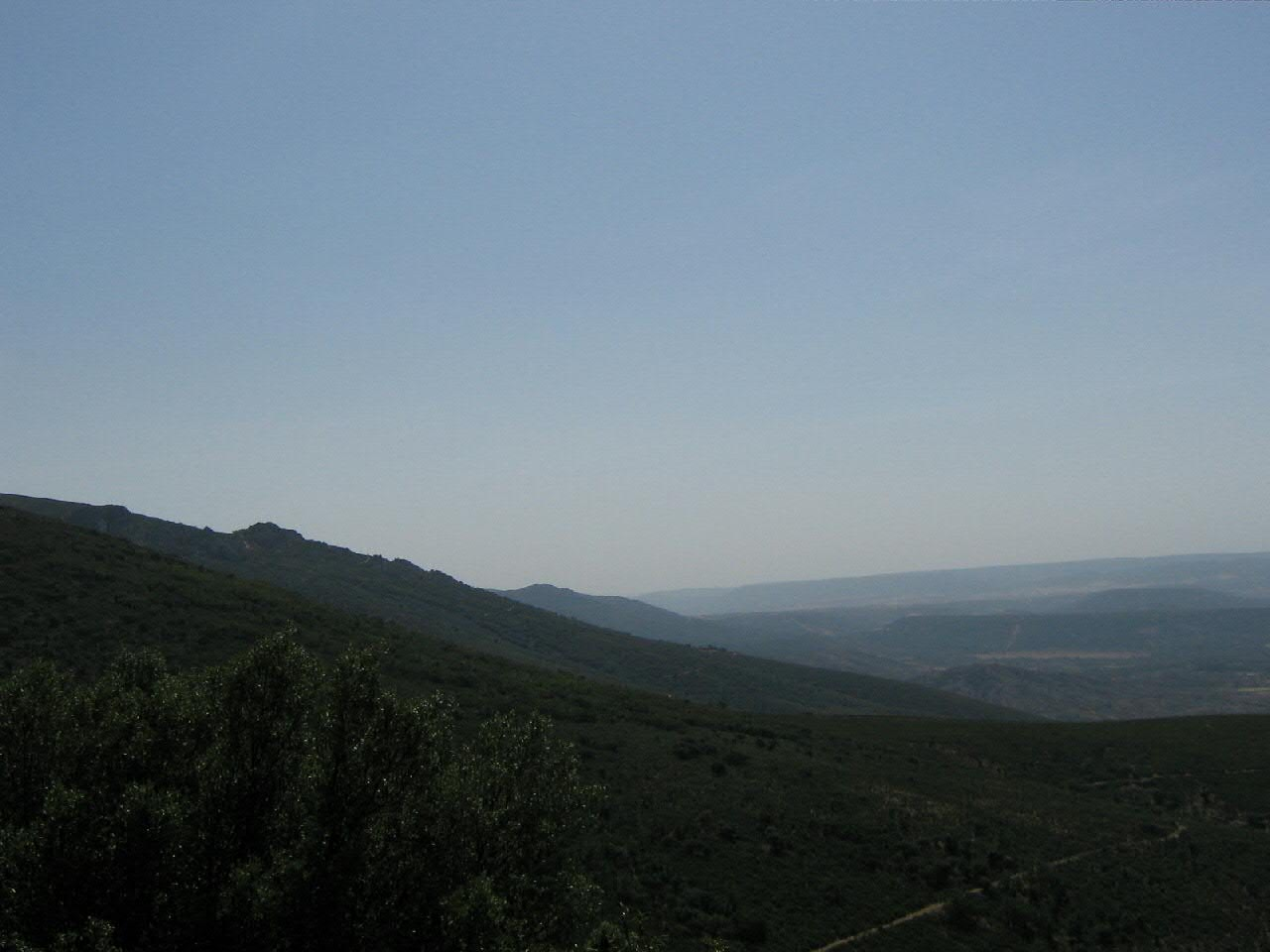
- View of one of the eastern ranges in Cabañeros National Park

Highest point
- Peak: La Villuerca
- Elevation: 1,603 m (5,259 ft)
- Coordinates: 39°30′45″N 04°43′53″W

Dimensions
- Length: 350 km (220 mi) E/W
- Width: 100 km (62 mi) N/S

Geography
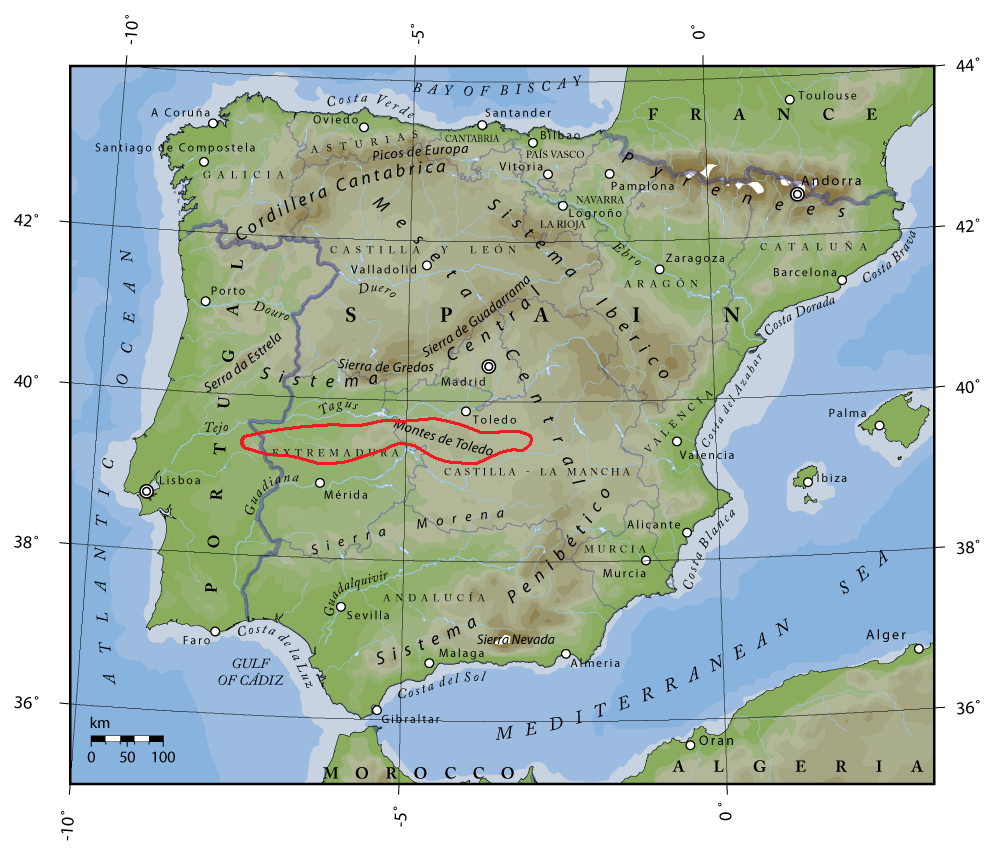
- Location of the Montes de Toledo System in the Iberian Peninsula
- Countries: Spain and Portugal
- Communities: Castile-La Mancha, Extremadura and Portalegre
- Range coordinates: 39°23′0″N 4°29′30″W

Geology
- Orogeny: Alpine
- Rock age: Tertiary
- Rock type: Sedimentary rock

The Montes de Toledo is one of the main systems of mountain ranges in the Iberian Peninsula. They divide the drainage basin of the Tagus from the basin of the Guadiana. The highest peak is La Villuerca, which is 1,603 m (5,259 ft) high.

== Description ==
The Montes de Toledo are located in the central regions of the Iberian Peninsula, cutting transversally from east to west across the lower portion of the Meseta Central. The length of the Montes de Toledo is 350 km (220 mi) and their maximum width up to 100 km (62 mi) near Sonseca and Puertollano.

The eastern Montes de Toledo ranges form one of the natural limits of the historical La Mancha region in Castile-La Mancha and the western end, including the ranges forming the broader Montes de Toledo, reaches into Portalegre District, Portugal.

=== Geology ===
Geologically the series of ranges making up the system were formed by Alpine orogeny, but unlike the Central System further north the Montes de Toledo comprise an older terrain of elongated belts of folded and thrust faulted sedimentary rocks that is quite heavily eroded.

The geological structure of the Montes de Toledo is similar to the geology of the Appalachians and akin as well to the geology of the Sierra Morena range further south.

=== Ranges ===
The Montes de Toledo are divided in the following physiographic longitudinal sectors or zones:

- The Montes de Toledo in a strict sense are located in the eastern section of the system, in northwestern Ciudad Real Province and southwestern Toledo Province, giving its name to the Montes de Toledo Comarca. Despite its name this comarca only includes a small part of the range. The main summits of this region are Rocigalgo (1,447 m (4,747 ft)), Corral de Cantos (1,421 m (4,662 ft)), Peñafiel (1,319 m (4,327 ft)) and Amor (1379).
  - The main range of this zone is Sierra de la Calderina, with the Sierra de la Virgen (highest point 1,213 m (3,980 ft) high Pico Alamillo), Sierra Luenga, Sierra Arando, Sierra del Reventón, Sierra Morrones and Sierra de la Cueva subranges.
  - Other ranges of this zone are Sierra de los Yébenes, Sierra de San Pablo, Macizos de Montalbán and Macizos de Rocilargo.
- The broader Montes de Toledo system includes the following ranges stretching towards the west:
  - Sierra de Altamira, highest point Riscos Altos (1,324 m (4,344 ft)). Other noteworthy peaks are Risco de las Moras (1,279 m (4,196 ft)) and Risco de los Gavilanes (1,246 m (4,088 ft)). It is located in La Jara Comarca at the border area between Extremadura and Castilla-La Mancha. Nearby are minor ranges such as the Sierra de Sevilleja, Sierra de la Hiruela and Sierra del Horno, also known collectively as "Sierras de la Jara".
  - Sierra del Hospital del Obispo, parallel to the Sierra de Altamira further east. Cervales, 1,443 m (4,734 ft), is the highest point of the range. The Guadarranque River runs by Navatrasierra in the valley between the two ranges.
  - Sierra de Villuercas, also known as Sierra de Guadalupe, it rises within Extremadura in Las Villuercas comarca, province of Cáceres. This range is where the highest altitudes of the whole system are found. Besides 1,603 m (5,259 ft) high La Villuerca, the highest peaks are Carbonero (1,428 m (4,685 ft)), Ballesteros (1,342 m (4,403 ft)), Sobacorbas (1,320 m (4,330 ft)) and Risco Redondo (1,287 m (4,222 ft)).
  - Sierra de Montánchez, located in the central/southern region of Cáceres Province. Its highest point is 995 m (3,264 ft) high Monte Viejo. Other notable summits are Cancho Blanco (955 m (3,133 ft)) and Alijares (786 m (2,579 ft)).
  - Sierra de San Pedro, between Cáceres and Badajoz provinces. Its highest peaks are Torrico de San Pedro (702 m (2,303 ft)), Atalaya (624 m (2,047 ft)), Chorlo (624 m (2,047 ft)), Morrón del Cotarro (615 m (2,018 ft)) and Manzano (610 m (2,000 ft)). The Sierra de Carbajo, also known as Sierra de Santiago, is a small range located north of the western end of Sierra de San Pedro, above Carbajo and Santiago de Alcántara.
  - Serra de São Mamede, located in the Alto Alentejo Province, Portugal, bordering Extremadura. Higher than the preceding two ranges, this range forms the western end of the greater Montes de Toledo. Its highest point is 1,025 m (3,363 ft) high Pico de São Mamede. Other important peaks are Fria, Pico de Marvão and Castelo de Vide. The town of Marvão is located on top of a ridge of the range.

=== Main ranges and features ===
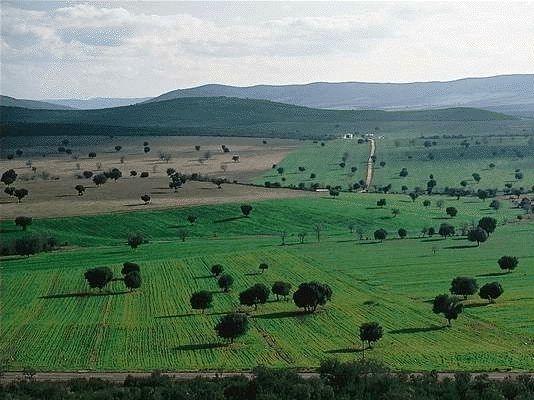
A dehesa, traditional pastoral management in the Montes de Toledo

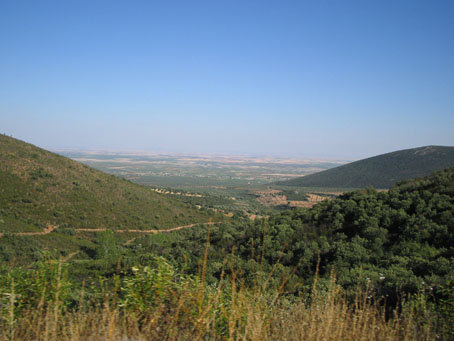
Montes de Toledo landscape in puerto de Los Santos (Ciudad Real) with the Sierra de la Virgen on the right

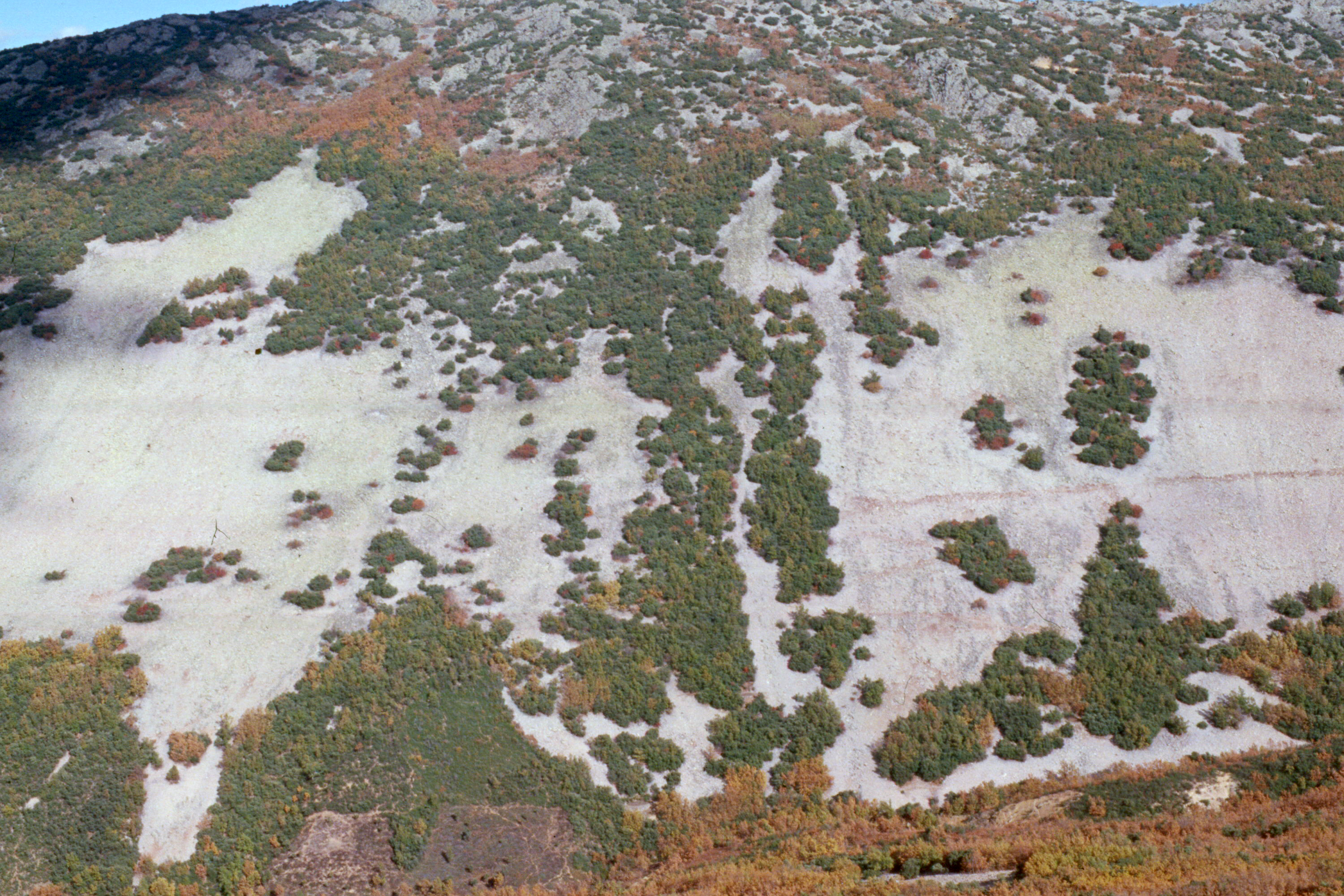
Scree slopes in the Montes de Toledo

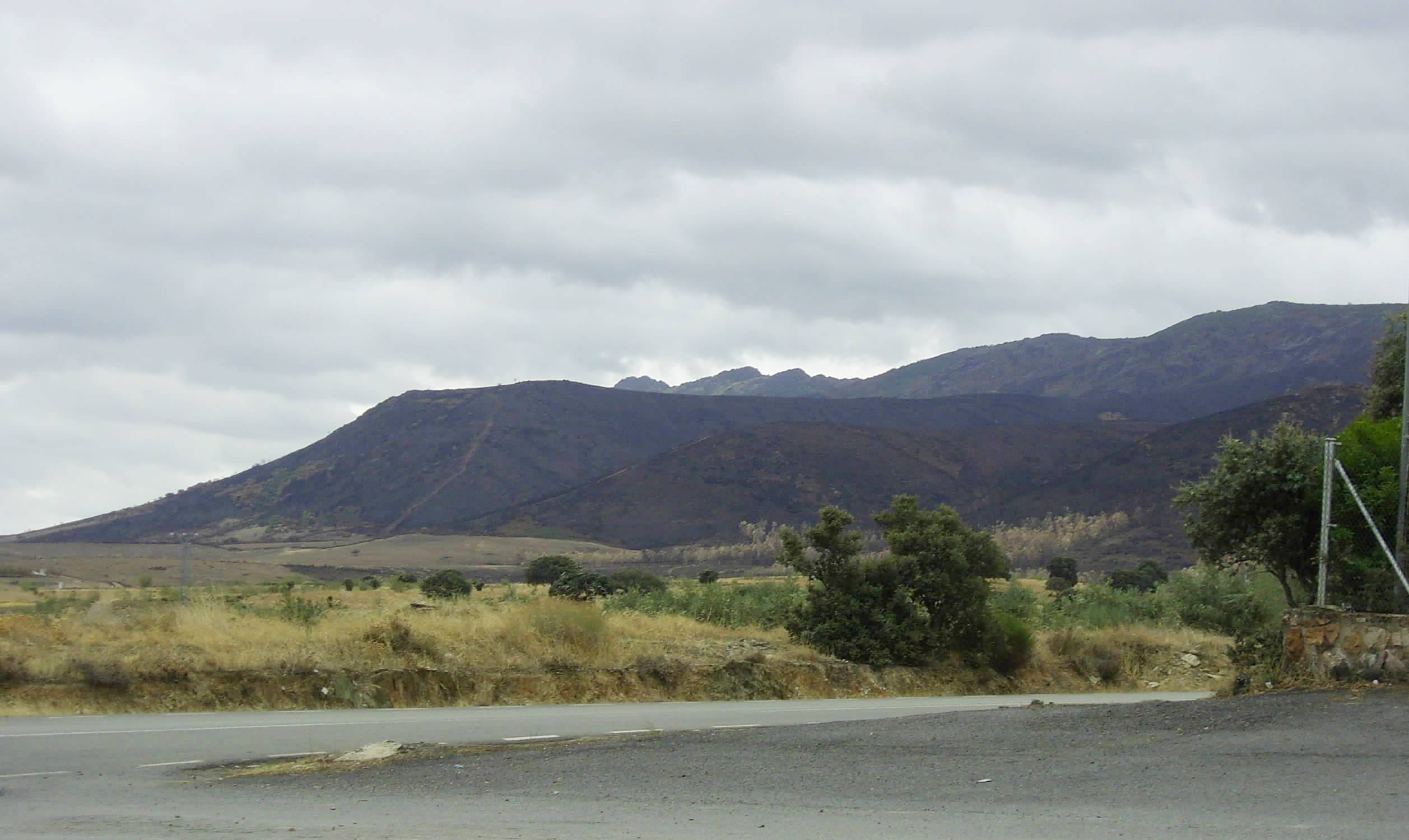
View of Sierra de Altamira near Carrascalejo

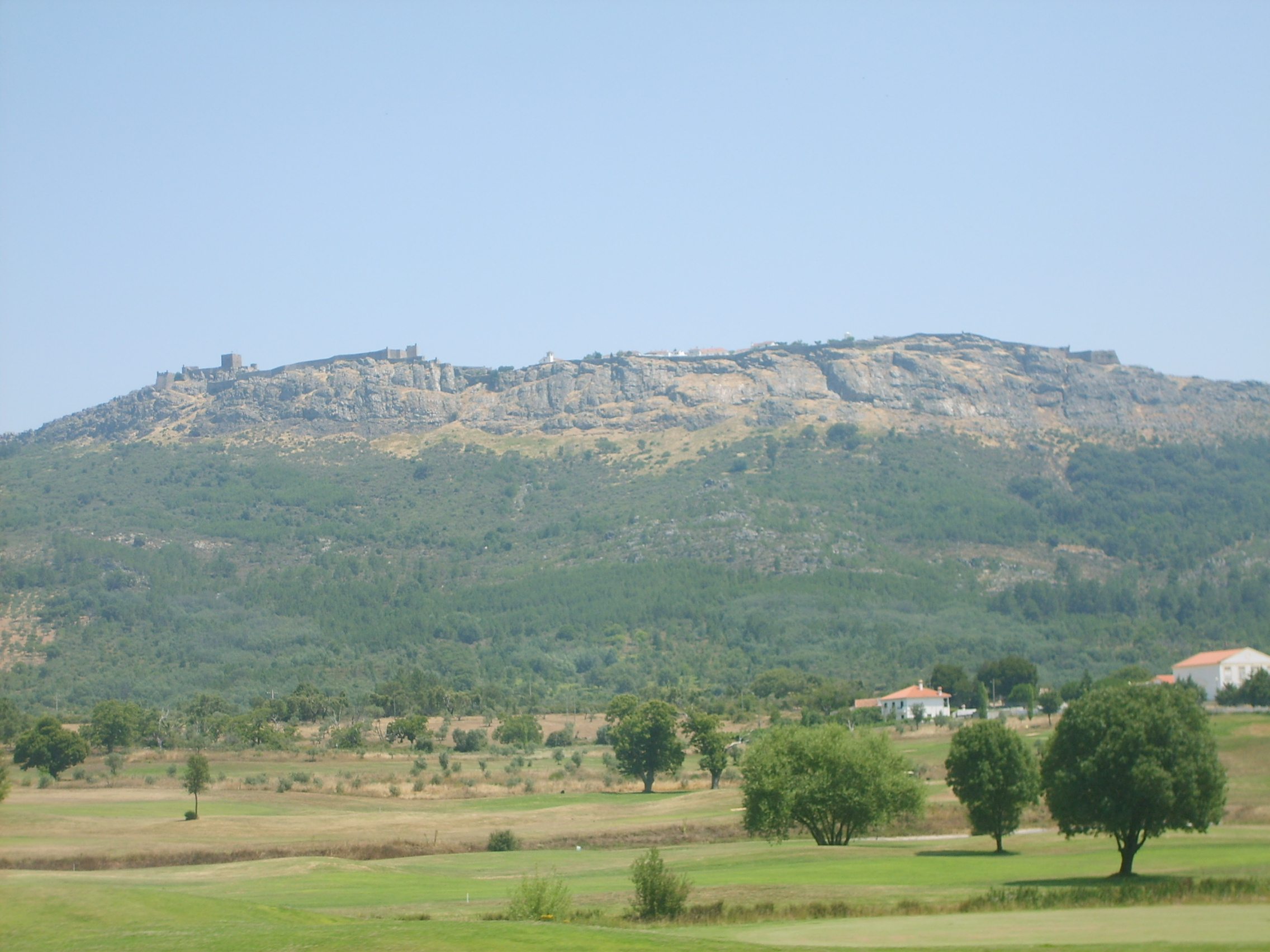
View of Marvão peak in Serra de São Mamede

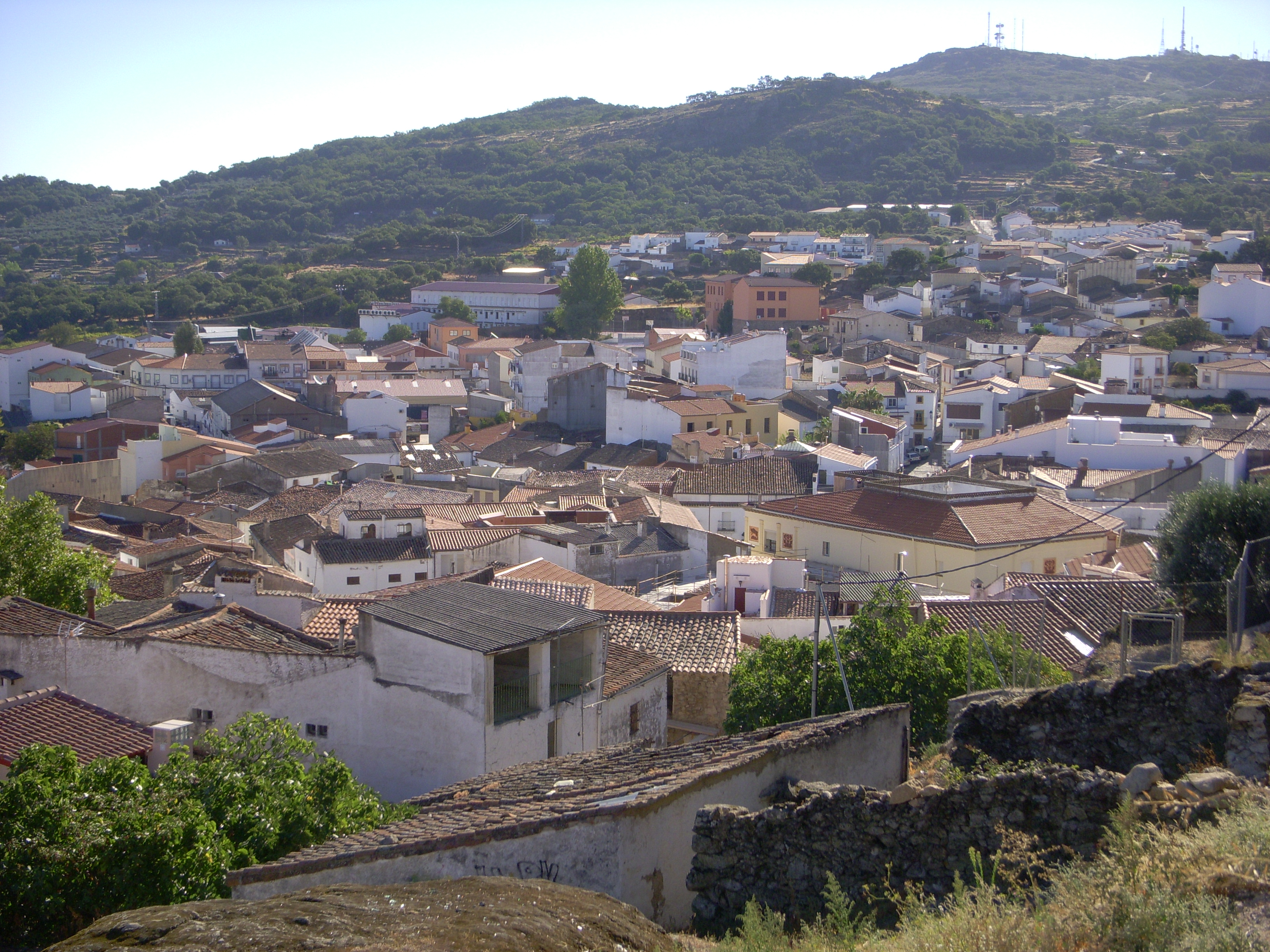
Sierra de Montánchez above Montánchez town

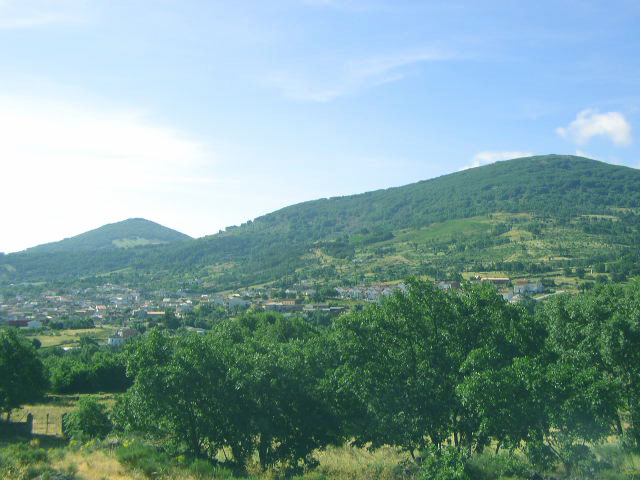
San Pablo de los Montes below the Sierra de San Pablo

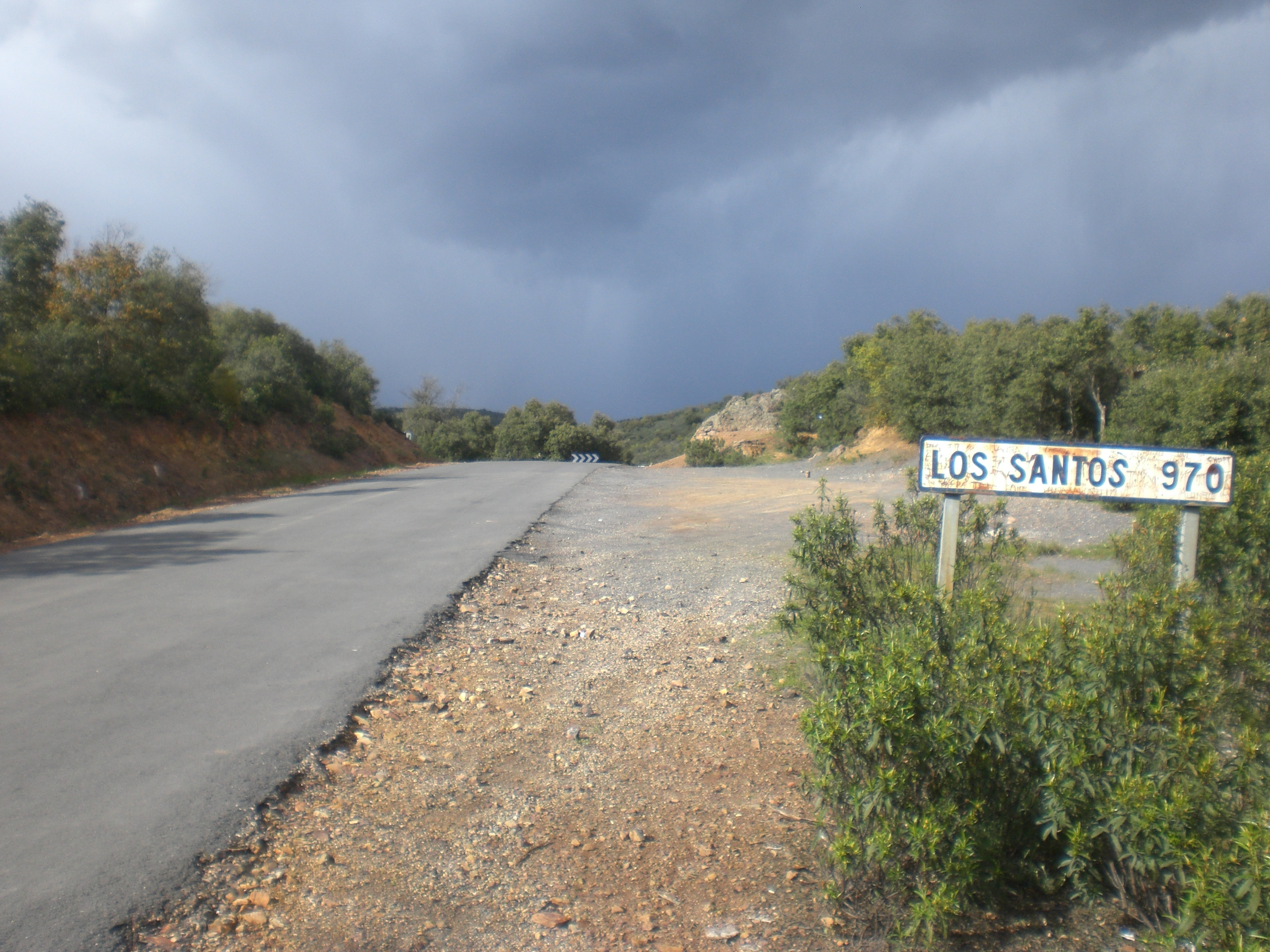
Puerto de los Santos mountain pass across Sierra de la Calderina in Villarrubia de los Ojos municipal term

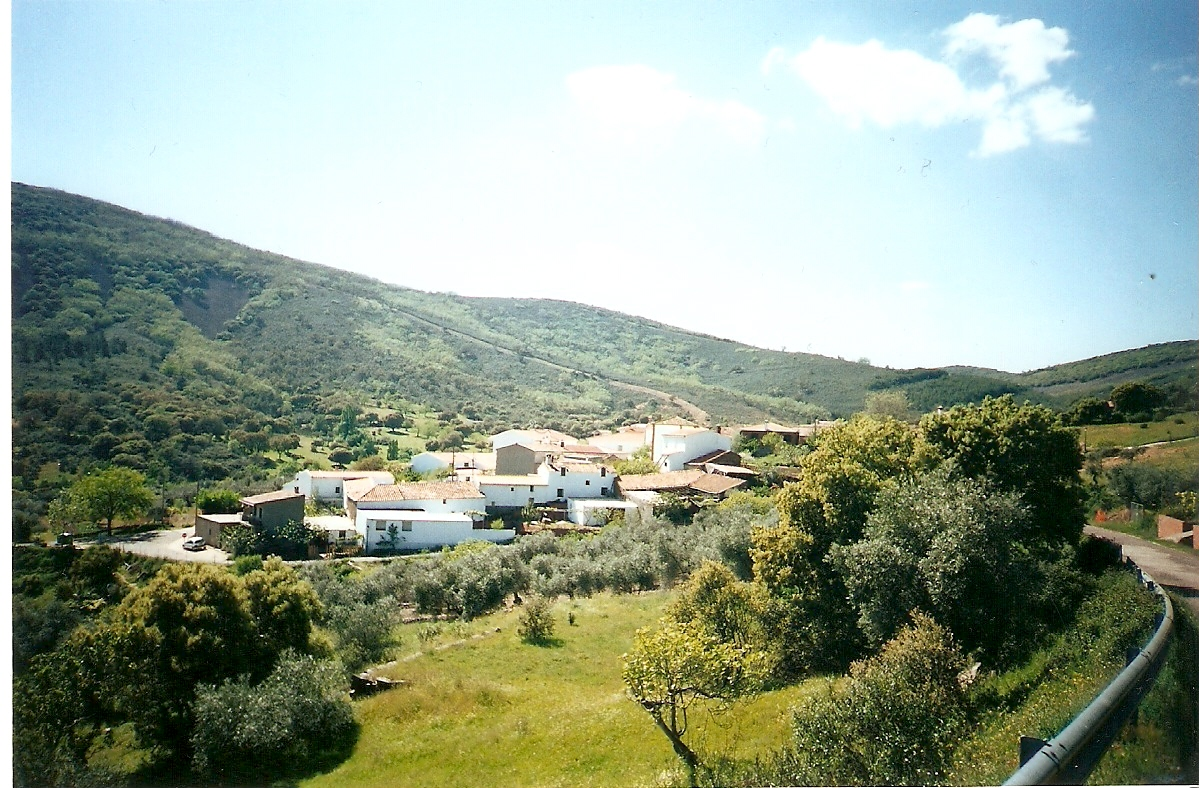
Mountains above Robledillo village near Robledo del Mazo

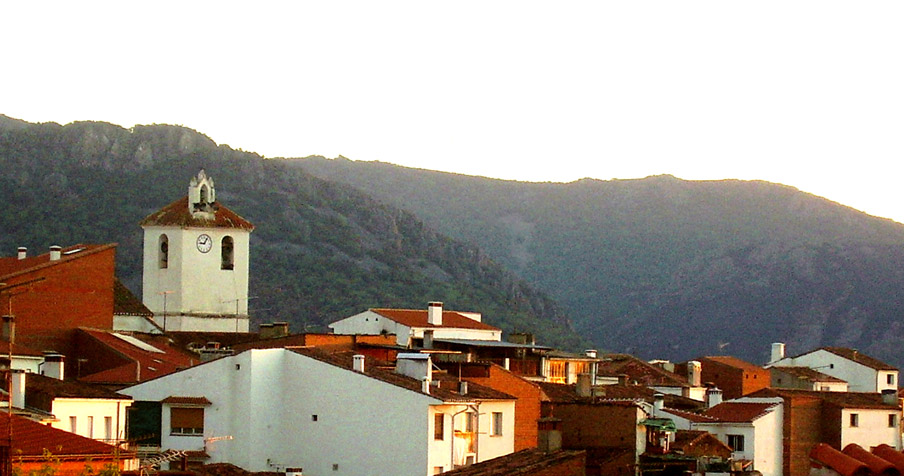
View of Sierra de la Palomera above Castañar de Ibor

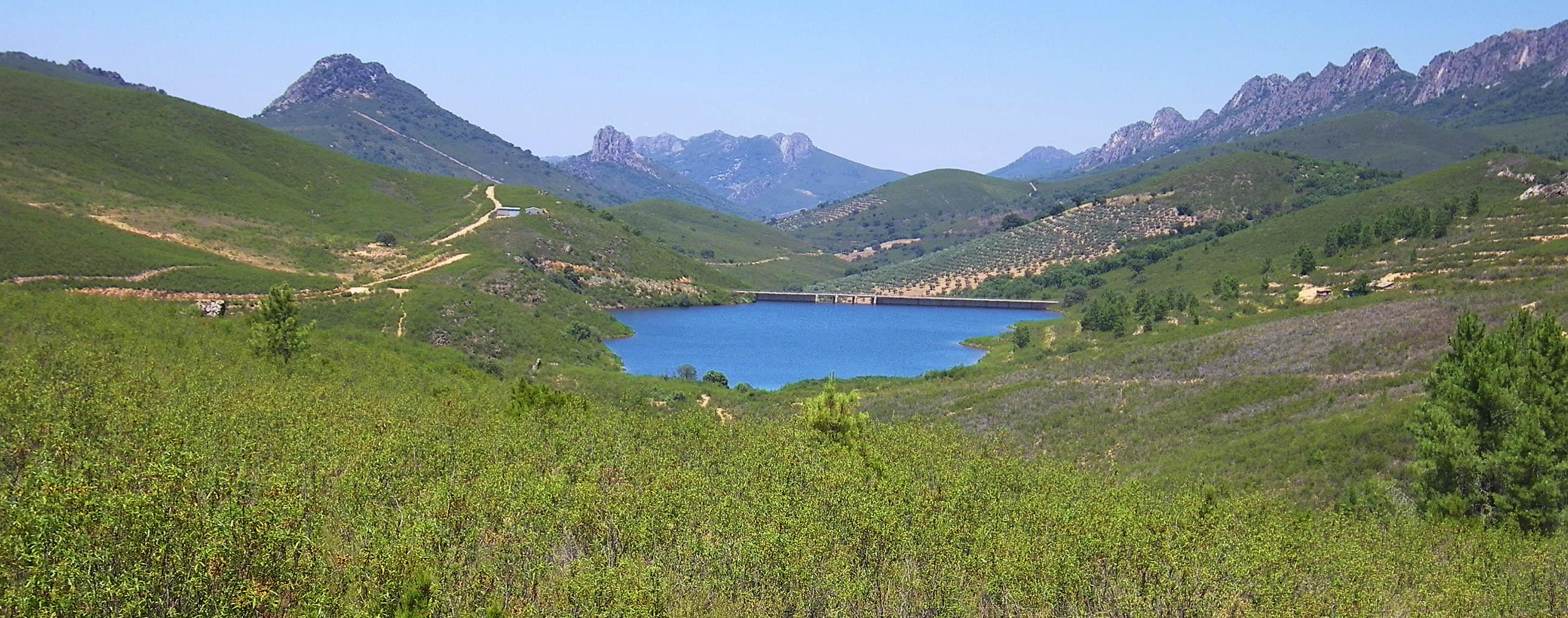
Sierra de Villuercas and Santa Lucia Dam

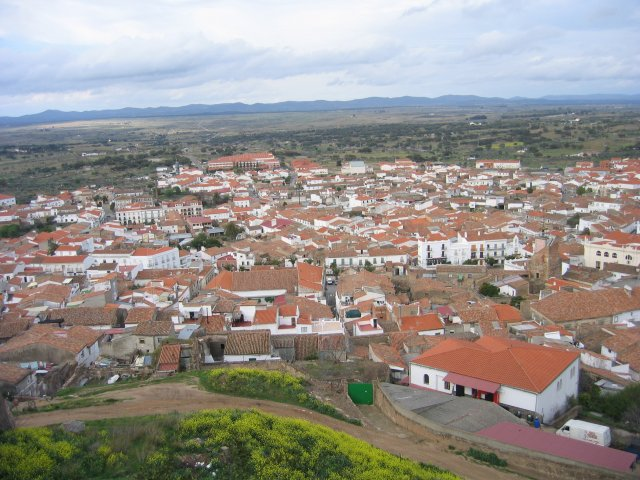
View of Alburquerque with the Sierra de San Pedro in the horizon

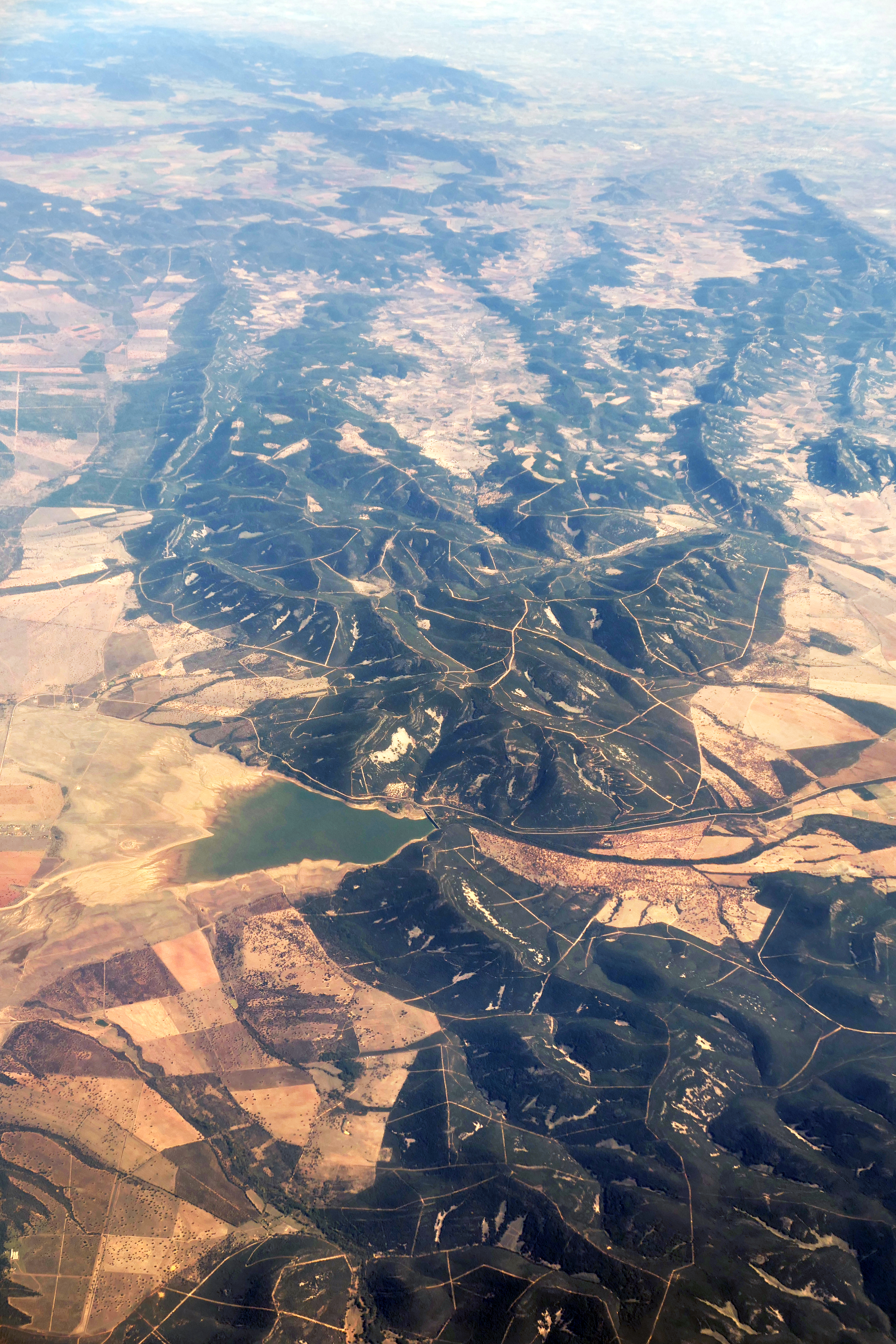
View over part of the range, east of the Cabañeros National Park. Also visible is the Torre de Abraham reservoir.

== Protected areas ==
- Cabañeros National Park
- Serra de São Mamede Natural Park

== See also ==
- Montes de Toledo Comarca
- La Jara
- Dehesa del Carrizal
- Geology of the Iberian Peninsula
