= Sierra de San Pedro =

Mountain range in Spain

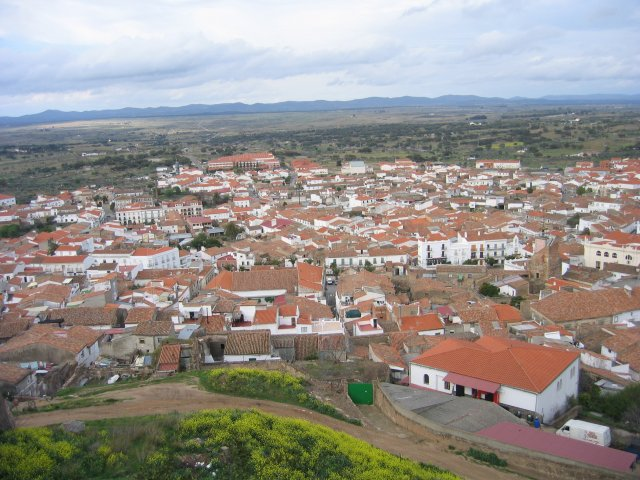
- View of Alburquerque with the Sierra de San Pedro in the background

Highest point
- Peak: Torrico de San Pedro
- Elevation: 702 m (2,303 ft)

Dimensions
- Length: 60 km (37 mi) NW/SE
- Width: 15 km (9.3 mi) NE/SW
- Area: 800 km^{2} (310 mi^{2})

Geography
- Location within Spain
- Location: Extremadura, Spain
- Country: Spain
- Range coordinates: 39°18′N 6°35′W
- Parent range: Montes de Toledo

Geology
- Orogeny: Alpine
- Rock age: Paleozoic
- Rock type(s): Granite, slate

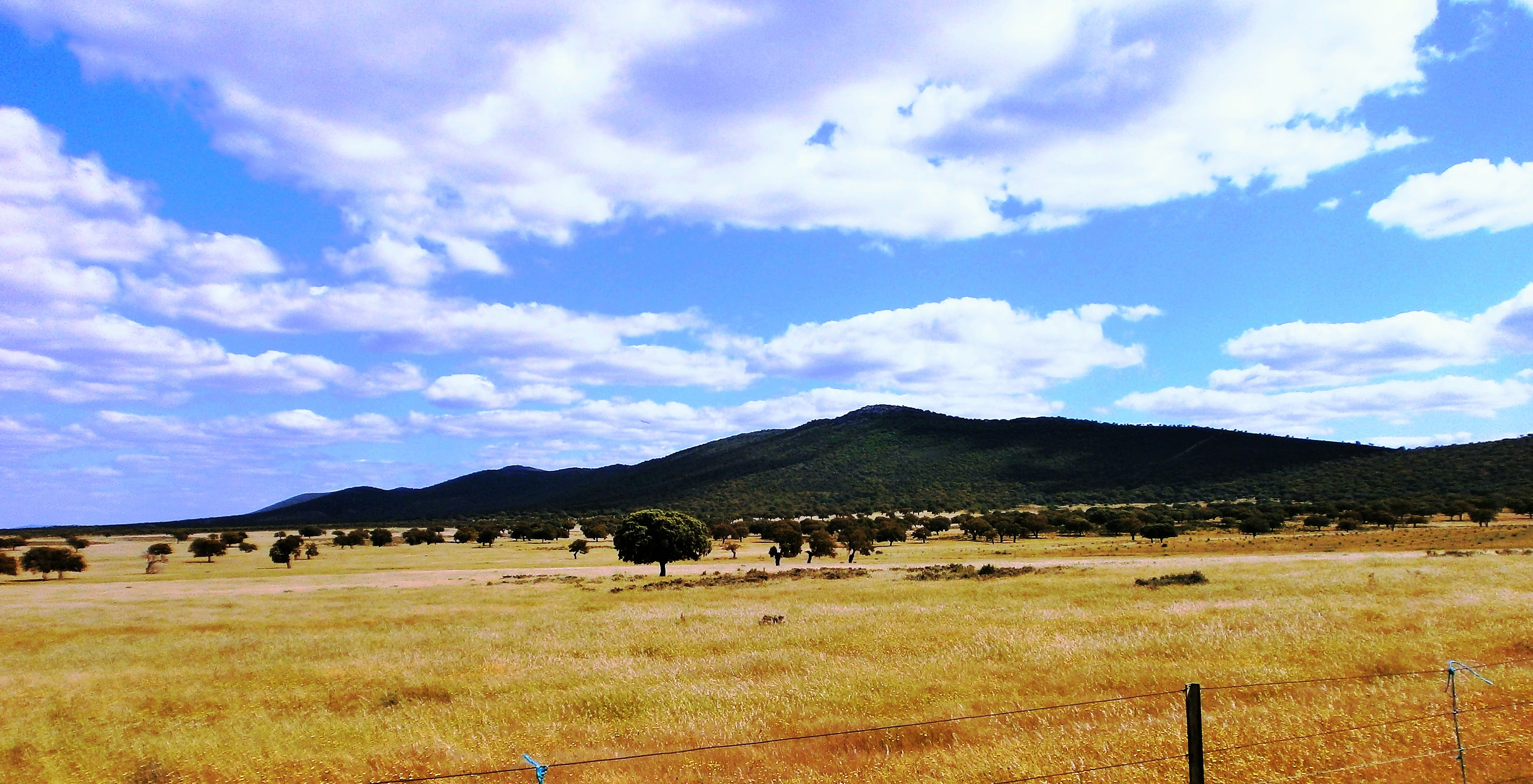
One of the peaks of the San Pedro Range rising above the plateau.

Sierra de San Pedro is a mountain range in the greater Montes de Toledo range, Spain. It is named after Saint Peter the apostle and rises in the limits of Cáceres and Badajoz Provinces, in the western part of the autonomous community of Extremadura close to its border with Portugal. This range gives its name to the Sierra de San Pedro - Los Baldíos comarca.

This mountain range separates the drainage basin of the Tagus to the north from the basin of the Guadiana to the south. The main rivers that have their sources in this range are the Rivera de Aurela, flowing towards the Tagus, as well as the Zapatón River, a tributary of the Xévora River that flows through Portugal into the Guadiana.

The Sierra de San Pedro is a Site of Community Importance in Spain with ID ES0000070.

== Description ==
The Sierra de San Pedro is a range of low hills that stretches for over 60 km in a NW/SE direction. It is parallel to the Serra de São Mamede to the west in nearby Portugal and is relatively lower than the latter. The range is located between the towns of Arroyo de la Luz north of the range and Alburquerque to the south, and the N-630 road in the east and the towns of Membrio and San Vicente de Alcántara in the west. The Peña del Águila Dam on river Zapatón that supplies water to Alburquerque is located in the range. A projection of the range stretching northwards from its western end is known as the Sierra de Carbajo, also named Sierra de Santiago, a small range located between Carbajo and Santiago de Alcántara.

The Sierra de San Pedro range is not very conspicuous and since the maximum altitudes rarely surpass 700 m, its main ridge barely rises above the surrounding high plateau in some stretches. The highest point is 702 m high Torrico de San Pedro, other important summits are Atalaya (624 m), Chorlo (624 m), Morrón del Cotarro (615 m) and Manzano (610 m).

The vegetation of the Sierra de San Pedro range is characteristic Mediterranean scrubland with wooded patches and clarified forests, where the holm oak dominates, present across the range. The shrubland of the range includes flowers such as Asphodelus and common peony. The wild vegetation alternates with cork oak whose growth was traditionally promoted by the inhabitants of the area in order to obtain cork, for this range has one of the highest productions of cork in the world. There is a very old and large cork oak that has been nicknamed El Abuelo (The Grandfather) in the range.

=== Environment ===
The Sierra de San Pedro is an important ecological area. Since it provides a home for birds such as the Spanish imperial eagle, the cinereous vulture, the Egyptian vulture, the golden eagle, the short-toed snake eagle, the black kite, the black-winged kite, the booted eagle, the Eurasian eagle-owl, the peregrine falcon, the white stork and the black stork, the range was declared a Special Protection Area for birds by the European Union. The range also harbors an important bat population in its caves.

The International Tagus Natural Park is a large protected area stretching between Spain and Portugal located at the northern limits of the Sierra de San Pedro range.

=== Geology ===
Paleozoic and Precambrian slates and granite are predominant throughout the Sierra de San Pedro. Upper Carboniferous sandstones and conglomerates are also present in the area of the range.

== See also ==
- Geography of Spain
- Geology of the Iberian Peninsula
