= Battle of Arroyo dos Molinos =

1811 battle of the Peninsular War

- Part of the Peninsular War
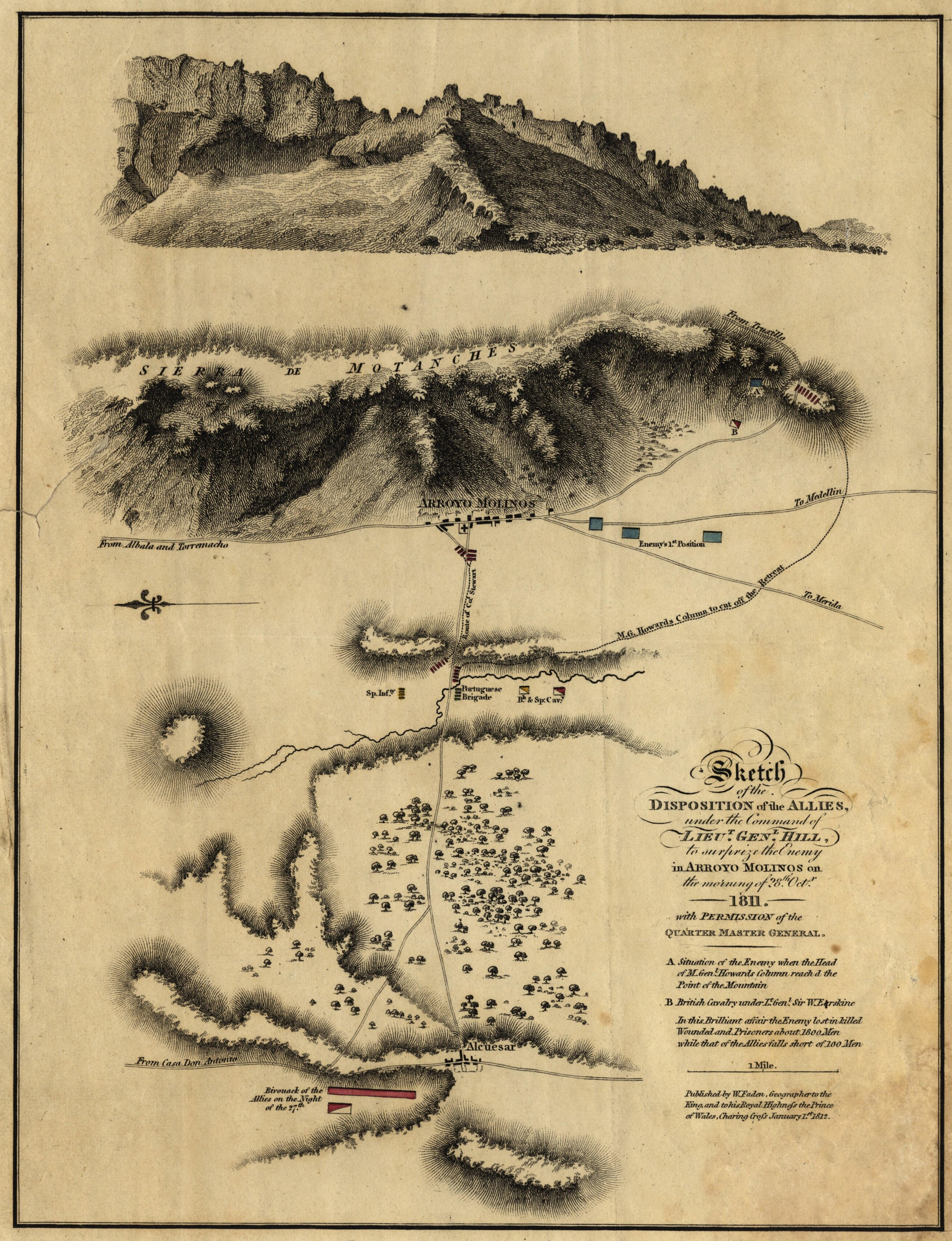
- 1812 sketch of the battle by William Faden
Date	28 October 1811
Location	Arroyo dos Molinos, Spain 39°11′N 6°10′W
Result	Coalition victory

Belligerents
United Kingdom; Portugal; Spain	France

Commanders and leaders
(United Kingdom of Great Britain and Ireland) Rowland Hill	(First French Empire) Jean-Baptiste Girard

Strength
5,000	3,000

Casualties and losses
37 killed 64 wounded	600-900 killed or wounded 700-1,300 captured 3 guns captured

Peninsular War
Castile 1811–13
current battle

The Battle of Arroyo dos Molinos took place on 28 October 1811 during the Peninsular War. An allied force under General Rowland Hill trapped and defeated a French force under General Jean-Baptiste Girard, forcing the latter's dismissal by the Emperor Napoleon. A whole French infantry division and a brigade of cavalry were destroyed as viable fighting formations.

== Background ==
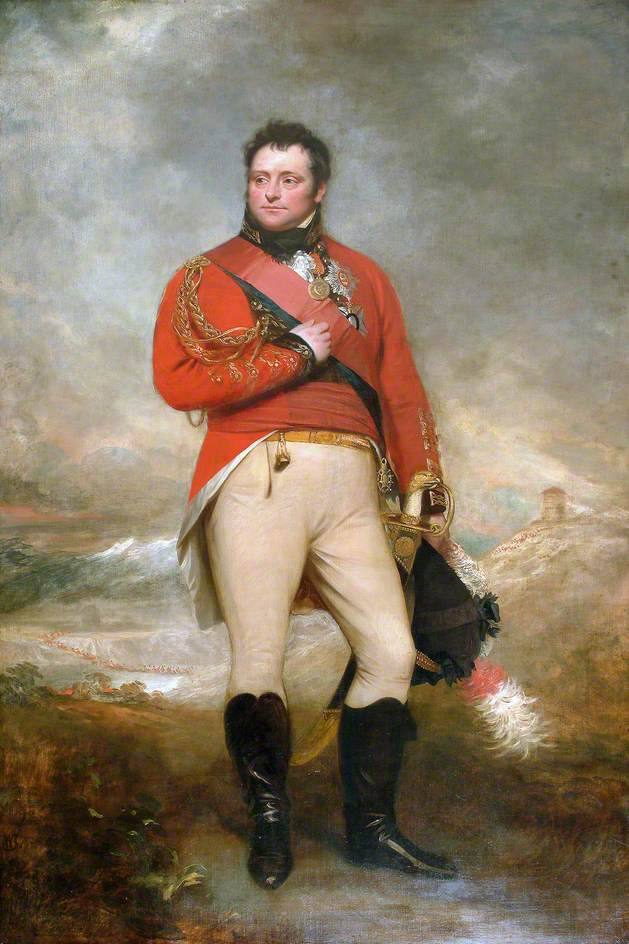
Rowland Hill

In the middle of October, 1811 a French Imperial Army division under the command of Jean-Baptiste Girard crossed the River Guadiana at Mérida and campaigned in Northern Extremadura. Major-General Rowland Hill consulted with Lieutenant-General Lord Wellington and received permission to use his 2nd Division to pursue Girard. Upon learning that the French had halted at the village of Arroyo dos Molinos, near Alcuéscar, Hill force-marched his troops for three days in poor weather so as to catch the French before they moved on.

By the evening of the 27 October, Hill's forces had reached a point four miles from the French at Arroyo dos Molinos, and had the area around the enemy surrounded. The 71st (Highland) Regiment of Foot was ordered to occupy the village of Alcuéscar, three miles from Arroyo. During the night there was a violent hail-storm, and on the following morning the weather was still so foul that the French pickets on duty had their backs turned so as to gain some reprieve from the wind and rain - it was from this direction that Hill's forces attacked at dawn on the 28th.

== Battle ==
The French 34th and 40th Line Infantry Regiments suffered extremely heavy losses during the battle, although to Marshal Jean-de-Dieu Soult's relief the French Imperial Eagles of the two regiments were not captured. He wrote to Napoleon: "L'honneur des armes est sauvé; les Aigles ne sont pas tombés au pouvoir de l'ennemi". ["The honour of the army is saved; the Eagles did not fall into the hands of the enemy".]

Robert Ballard Long's cavalry charged, the 2nd Hussars King's German Legion particularly distinguishing themselves, and broke the French cavalry. Over 200 of them were captured plus three pieces of artillery. The attackers suffered only 37 killed and 64 wounded. In contrast, reports of total French casualties vary, with estimates of between 600 and 900 killed or wounded and between 700 and 1,300 captured.

== Aftermath ==
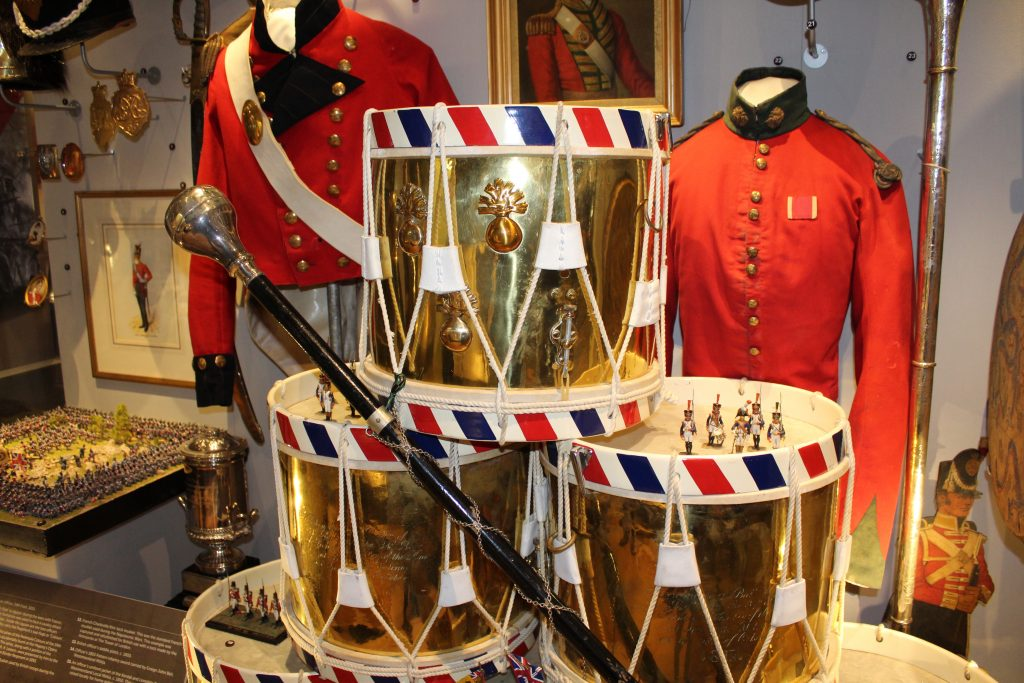
Captured side-drums of the 34th Line Infantry Regiment displayed at the Museum of Military Life in Carlisle Castle

On 5 November a jubilant Hill (who would be made a Knight of the Bath for Arroyo dos Molinos) wrote to his sister:

I have time merely to inform you that on the morning of the 28th at daybreak I succeeded in surprising, attacking, and annihilating the French corps under General Girard at Arroyo dos Molinos. The enemy's force, when attacked, consisted of about 3,000 infantry, 1,600 cavalry and artillery. The result is the capture of one general, one colonel, 35 lieutenant-colonels and inferior officers, 1,400 prisoners, and probably 500 killed. The others dispersed, having thrown away their arms; we have also got all the enemy's artillery, baggage, and magazines—in short, everything that belonged to the corps.

Though the French Imperial Eagles may "not have fallen into the hands of the enemy", however, the 34th (Cumberland) Regiment of Foot captured six side-drums of the 34th Line Infantry Regiment together with the regimental drum major's staff, which was seized by Sergeant Moses Simpson of the 34th's Regiment of Foot's grenadier company. Included in the haul was the drum of the 34th Line Infantry Regiment's grenadier company, the shell of which was emblazoned with three flaming grenade emblems. The drums and drum major's staff are on display in Cumbria's Museum of Military Life at Carlisle Castle.

== Order of battle ==
=== British ===
In no order;

- 2nd Division
  - First Brigade (Howard's)
    - 9th (East Norfolk) Regiment of Foot
    - 24th (The 2nd Warwickshire) Regiment of Foot
    - 50th (Queen's Own) Regiment of Foot
    - One company, 5th Battalion, 60th (Royal American) Regiment of Foot
    - 71st (Highland) Regiment of Foot
    - 92nd (Gordon Highlanders) Regiment of Foot
  - Third Brigade (Wilson's)
    - One light company, 28th (North Gloucestershire) Regiment of Foot
    - 2nd Battalion, 34th (Cumberland) Regiment of Foot
    - 2nd Battalion, 39th (Dorsetshire) Regiment of Foot
    - One company, 5th Battalion, 60th (Royal American) Regiment of Foot
- Cavalry: 'D Brigade' (Long's)
  - 9th Light Dragoons
  - 13th Light Dragoons
  - 2nd Hussars King's German Legion

Spanish (2600)

- Morillo's Division
  - Voluntarios de la Victoria
  - Legión Extremeña
  - Regimento de la Unión
  - Regimento de León
- Penne de Villemur's Cavalry Division
  - Regimento de Linea de la Reina
  - Regimento de Linea Algarve
  - Dragones de Lusitania
  - Dragones de Sagunto
  - Cazadores de Sevilla
  - Lanceros de la Legión Extremeña

=== French ===
- Division Girard (4000)
  - Brigade Dombrowski
    - 28eme Votiguer (one light company)
    - 34eme Ligne Infantry Regiment (3 battalions)
    - 40eme Ligne Infantry Regiment (3 battalions)
  - Brigade Bron
    - 27eme Chasseurs à Cheval (light cavalry)
    - 10eme Hussars
    - 20eme Dragoons

Artillery: one 8-pdr, one 4-pdr, one Lgt Howitzer.

== In popular culture ==
- Sánchez, María (Director); Bote, Daniel (Director) (2015). El disparo que rompe el silencio. Arroyomolinos 1811 [The shot that breaks the silence. Arroyomolinos 1811.] (Youtube) (in Spanish and English). ISAN:0000-0003-DB83-0000-L-0000-0000-B.

Preceded by Battle of Saguntum	Napoleonic Wars; Battle of Arroyo dos Molinos	Succeeded by Siege of Valencia (1812)
