= Sierra de Montánchez =

Mountain range in Spain

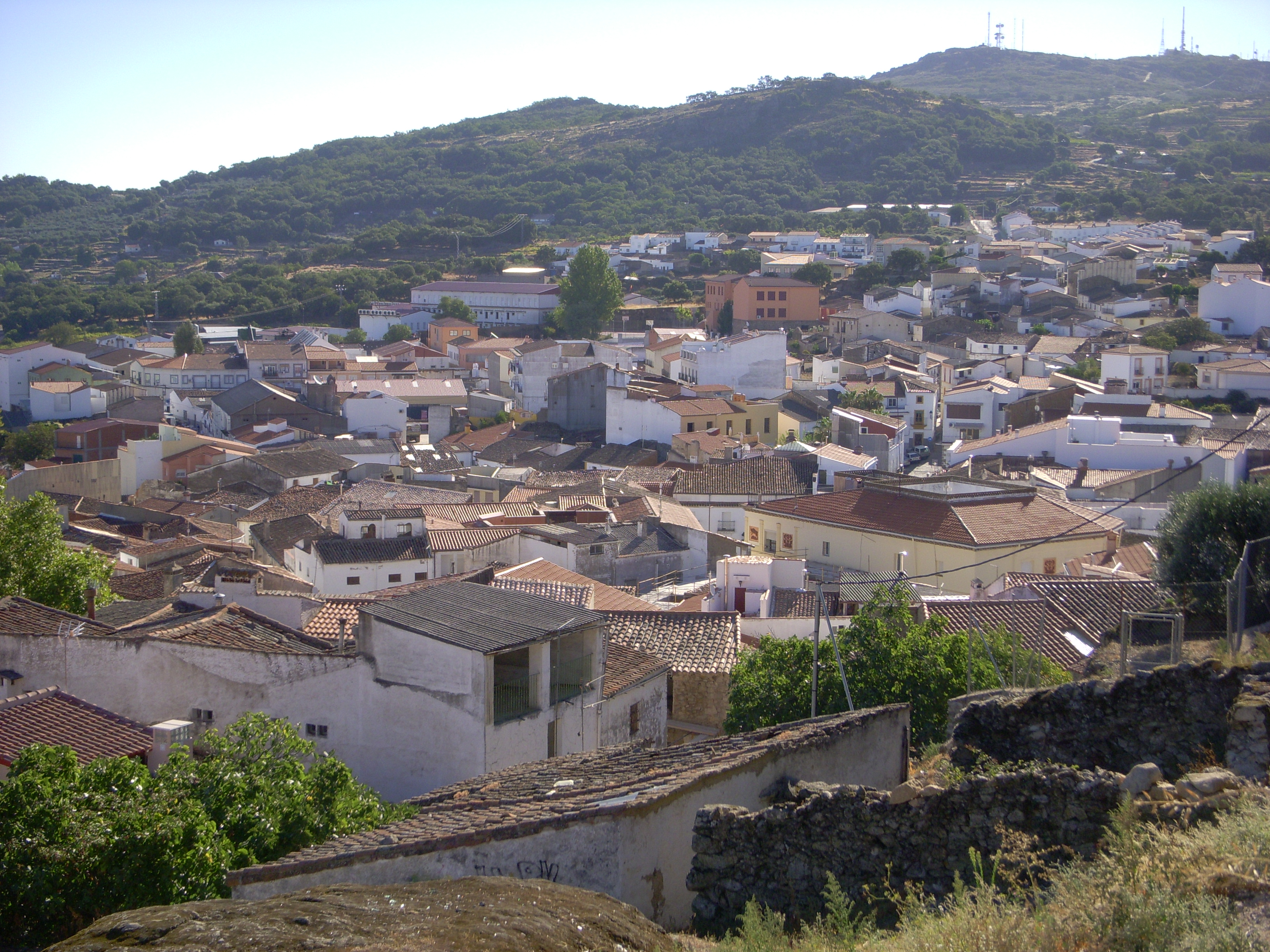
- View of the Sierra de Montánchez behind the town

Highest point
- Peak: Monte Viejo
- Elevation: 995 m (3,264 ft)
- Coordinates: 39°12′54″N 6°7′25″W

Dimensions
- Length: 33 km (21 mi) NE/SW
- Width: 6.5 km (4.0 mi) NW/SE

Geography
- Location within Spain
- Location: Extremadura, Spain
- Country: Spain
- Range coordinates: 39°15′N 5°58′W
- Parent range: Montes de Toledo

Geology
- Orogeny: Alpine
- Rock age: Tertiary
- Rock type(s): Granite, slate

Sierra de Montánchez is a mountain range in the greater Montes de Toledo range, Spain. It is named after nearby Montánchez town, the capital of the Tierra de Montánchez comarca, located on its slopes. This range gives its name to the Mancomunidad Integral Sierra de Montánchez.

This mountain range separates the drainage basin of the Tagus to the north from the basin of the Guadiana to the south. The main rivers that have their sources in this range are the Salor and Tamuja, a tributary of the Almonte, flowing towards the Tagus, as well as the Aljucén River, a tributary of the Guadiana.

== Description ==
The Sierra de Montánchez stretches for about 33 km in a NE/SW direction west of the Sierra de Villuercas and is relatively lower than the latter. It rises towards the south of Cáceres Province, in the center of the autonomous community of Extremadura. Its highest point is 995 m high Monte Viejo, also known as Montancil or Monte Tances.

There is a road leading to the Monte Viejo mountaintop where there is a cellular repeater antenna and an attached building. At the 955 m high Cancho Blanco summit there is a weather surveillance radar. The Castillo de Montánchez, a castle built during the times of Moorish Spain is located on a 741 m high hillock above Montánchez town. Besides Montánchez, Alcuéscar, Arroyomolinos and Zarza de Montánchez are other important towns in the area.

Shrubland is prevalent in the areas covered with natural vegetation. There are also scattered patches of forested zones, sometimes planted with non-native species such as eucalyptus.

=== Geology ===
Precambrian slates and clays are predominant in the area. Rankers, subhumid in the northern and dry in the southern slopes, have developed over granite in the mountains.
