= Andreas Daniel Berthold von Schepeler =

German army officer and historian

- Born: c.1779 Göttingen, Lower Saxony
- Died: 1849 (aged 69–70)
- Occupations: Army officer, historian and Hispanist
- Movement: War of the Fourth Coalition; Battle of Eylau; Battle of Königsberg (1807); Peninsular War; Battle of Saguntum; Siege of Valencia

Andreas Daniel Berthold von Schepeler (1779 or 1780–1849) was a Prussian Cavalry officer who later entered the service of Spain during the Peninsular War.

Together with Juan Nicolás Böhl de Faber, Schepeler was considered the 19th century's most important German Hispanist.

British military historian Charles Oman considered Schepeler "one of the best historians of the war", and "a very well-informed and impartial writer".

== Early career ==
After enlisting in the Austrian Army at the age of 18, Schepeler later joined the Prussian Army, seeing action, and defeat, at Jena–Auerstedt (1806).

On returning to the Austrian Army, Schepeler was given command of a company and the following year saw action at Eylau and Königsberg.

He was later assigned the task of fomenting uprisings against Napoleon in Berlin, Brunswick, Hannover and Cassel, and was eventually given a command in the Duke of Brunswick's Black Brunswickers, serving as a major alongside the Duke.

== Peninsular War ==
Realising the importance of the popular resistance he had observed in Spain following the May uprising in Madrid, Schepeler proposed a plan to raise a German contingent, plan which was approved by Marquess Wellesley, the British ambassador to Spain, and Duke of Alburquerque. Having obtained funding, Schepeler then embarked for Cadiz in April 1810 and joined the staff of General José de Zayas.

Schepeler later served under Captain general Joaquín Blake as a staff officer at Saguntum and at Valencia (November 1811 to 9 January 1812) at Alicante towards the end of January, and in Andalusia, under Count Villemur, later that year, and where he led a column that chased General Jean-Baptiste Drouet out of Cordoba.

== Post-war career ==
Following the war, Schepeler was appointed Prussia's charge d'affaires in Madrid and, whilst gathering material for his writings, advised Count of Toreno on his major work, History of the Rising, War and Revolution of Spain. After marrying and raising a daughter, the family left Spain in 1823 and Schepeler then proceeded to write and publish his works.

== Works ==
- Geschichte der Revolution Spaniens und Portugal und besonders des daraus enistandenen Krieges. Vols. I and II. Berlín, 1826 and 1827.
- Geschichte der Spanischen Monarchie von 1810-1813. Vols. I and II. Leipzig, 1829 y 1830
- Geschichte der Revolutionen des Spanischen Amerikas von 1808 bis 1823. Vols. I and II. Leipzig, 1833 and 1834
