= Luis Penne de Villemur =

French-born Spanish army officer (1761–1836)

- Born: 2 August 1761 Montégut, France
- Died: 24 August 1836 (aged 75) Estella, Navarra
- Conflicts: Peninsular War; Action at Azuaga; Battle of Albuera; Siege of Niebla; Battle of Arroyo dos Molinos

Luis Penne de Villemur, Count Villemur (1761–1836) was a French-born Cavalry officer in the service of Spain during the Peninsular War. He was later appointed military governor of Barcelona and Carlist minister of War.

== Early career ==
Villemur enlisted in the Spanish army in 1778, serving for some three years before returning to France. Enlisting as a cadet in the Royal Dragoon Regiment in 1780, he was promoted to sub-lieutenant of the Esterhazy Hussar Regiment in 1786 and lieutenant in 1791. That same year, he abandoned the regular army to enlist in the Armée des Princes, a unit of the counter-revolutionary Armée des Émigrés, in which he served until 1797. He then joined the Austrian Army.

== Peninsular War ==
Having left Hungary towards the end of 1809, Villemur arrived in Spain and was appointed a colonel of Cavalry in March 1810 and attached to Marquis de la Romana's army. He was promoted to brigadier the following February after having distinguished himself in action at Azuaga. He distinguished himself again the following May at the Battle of Albuera by defeating Soult's Polish Lancers.

Promoted to field marshal in June, he then served under General Zayas, participating at the siege of Niebla. Now a naturalised Spaniard, in October 1811 he led a Cavalry division at Arroyo dos Molinos. In April 1812, his Cavalry division, again with Morillo's Infantry, blockaded Seville, forcing Soult to return to the Andalusian capital.

In August 1812, forming the vanguard of Sir Rowland Hill's troops, headed towards Madrid, some of Villemur's horse, under the German colonel Schepeler, gave chase to Drouet, Soult's rearguard, to Cordoba, forcing the French to abandon that city and head towards Granada.

== Post-war career ==
Villemur was promoted to lieutenant general in 1816. Following Rafael del Riego's 1820 uprising, Villemur, then living in Badajoz, was accused of heading a Royalist plot, and managed to flee to Madrid, where he lived in disguise until the entry into Spain of the Hundred Thousand Sons of Saint Louis and the Duke of Angoulême gave him a command in Extremadura.

Villemur was later appointed military governor of Barcelona and second-in-command of Catalonia, under the governorship of Carlos de España (1827). Around 1832, following the definite approval of Ferdinand VII's Pragmatic Sanction, whereby the King's brother, the Infante Don Carlos, up to that time the heir presumptive, had to give up his claim in favour of the future Isabella II, Villemur, together with other officers of the garrison, "planned to take control of Barcelona and Catalonia, in the name of don Carlos, until the death of the King". However, Carlos de España, when informed by Villemur of the plot, refused to go along with it and presented a letter from don Carlos himself that prohibited any action on his behalf while Ferdinand was still alive. When Carlos de España was substituted by Manuel Llauder, Villemur was immediately dismissed, prohibited from travelling to Madrid or Extremadura and ordered to present himself at Zaragoza.

Involved in yet another plot for an uprising, Villemur fled to the north of Spain, where don Carlos appointed him minister of War, post he held until early 1836, when don Carlos appointed Juan Bautista Erro his "universal minister". That June, Erro gave Villemur military command of Aragón and Valencia but Villemur died the following August without any preparations having been made.
