= Gévora (river) =

River in Portugal and Spain

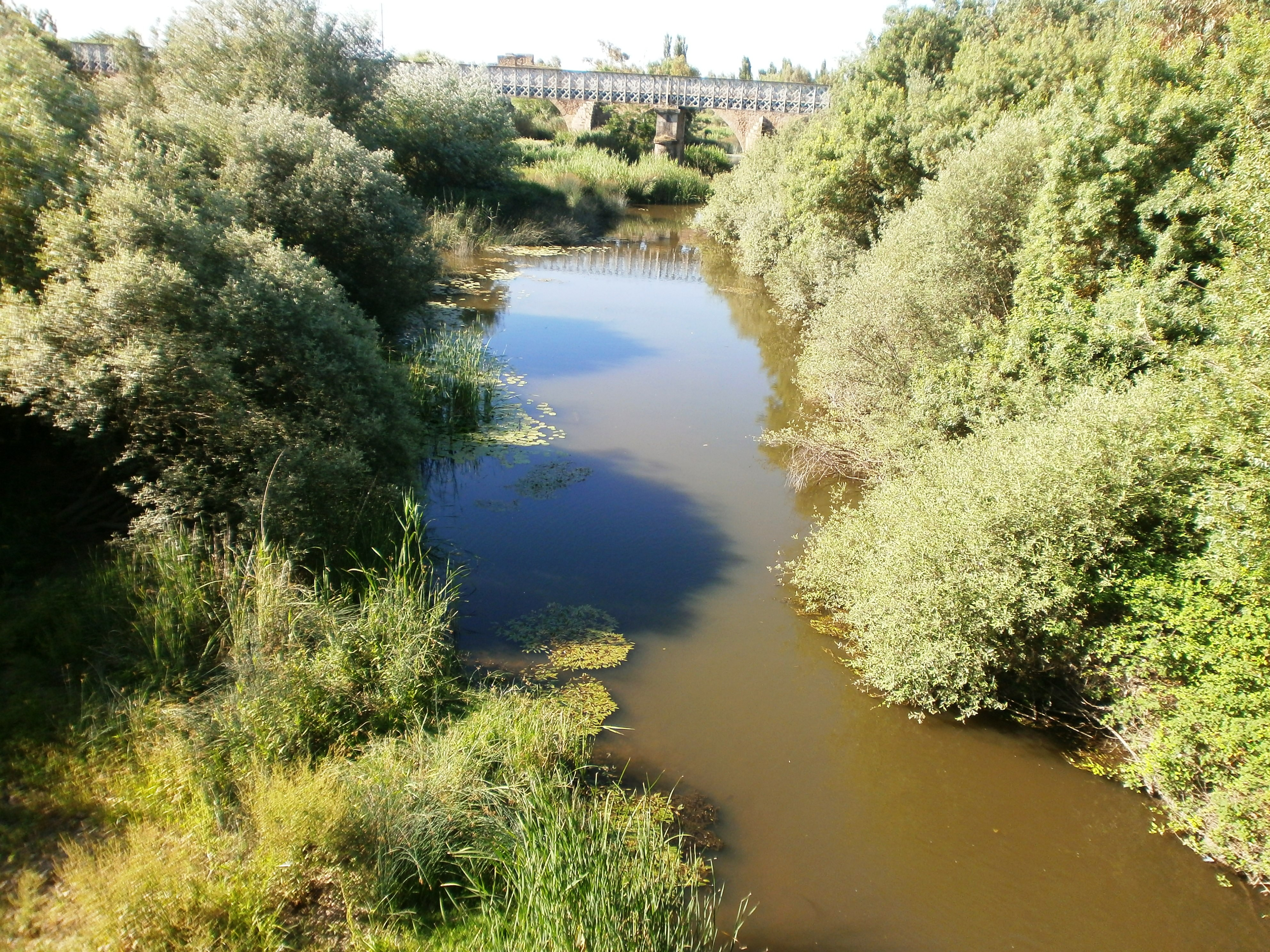
- The Gévora close to its mouth
- Native name: Gévora (Spanish); Xévora (Portuguese)

Location
- Country: Portugal, Spain

Physical characteristics
- Source
  - location: Serra de São Mamede
  - coordinates: 39°18′47″N 7°21′38″W
  - elevation: 1,027 m (3,369 ft)
- Mouth
  - location: Guadiana
  - coordinates: 38°53′31″N 6°57′53″W
- Length: 73.81 km (45.86 mi)
- Discharge
  - location: Foronomic station #4255 (Badajoz) (Note: Roughly 3 kilometre upstream from the river mouth. Data for the 1969–2014 period.)
  - average: 9.13 m^{3}/s
  - minimum: 0.26 m^{3}/s
  - maximum: 37.78 m^{3}/s

Basin features
- Progression: Guadiana→ Gulf of Cádiz

The Gévora (Spanish pronunciation: [ˈxeβoɾa]) or Xévora (Portuguese pronunciation: [ˈʒɛvuɾɐ]) is a tributary of the Guadiana, in the southwest of the Iberian Peninsula. It runs through both Portugal and Spain. (Note: It crosses the Portugal–Spain border three times.)

It has its source in the Serra de São Mamede (Portugal), at 1,027 metres above sea level. Featuring a total length of 73.81 km, the river, running initially roughly from west to east, takes a southern turn in Spain, eventually emptying into the Guadiana near Badajoz.

Some of its main left-bank tributaries are the Jola, Guarranque and Zapatón, while its right-bank tributaries include the Gevorete, Codosero and Abrilongo.
