= Arroyomolinos, Cáceres =

Arroyomolinos
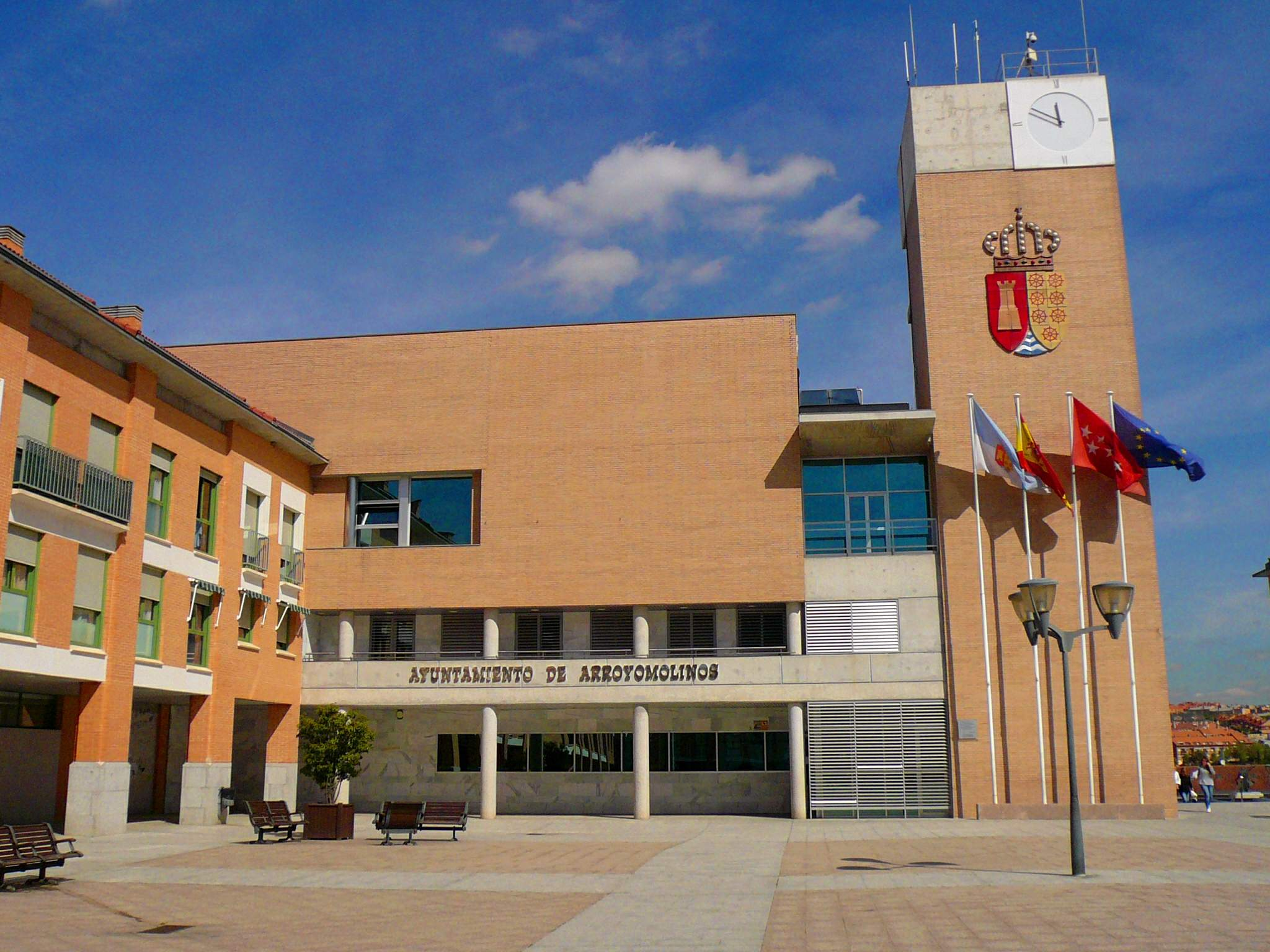
- Town hall

- Flag Coat of arms

- Location in Spain
- Coordinates: 39°11′N 6°10′W
- Country: Spain
- Autonomous community: Extremadura
- Province: Cáceres
- Mancomunidad: Mancomunidad Integral Sierra de Montánchez

Government
  - Mayor: Antonio Eusebio Solis Balset

Area
  - Total: 115.12 km^{2} (44.45 sq mi)
- Elevation: 400 m (1,300 ft)

Population (2025-01-01)
  - Total: 816
- Time zone: UTC+1 (CET)
  - Summer (DST): UTC+2 (CEST)

Arroyomolinos, also known as Arroyomolinos de Montánchez, is a village in the province of Cáceres and autonomous community of Extremadura, Spain. The municipality covers an area of 115 square kilometres (44 sq mi) and as of 2011 had a population of 962 people.

== History ==
During the Peninsular War, Arroyomolinos was the site of the Battle of Arroyo dos Molinos which took place on 28 October 1811.

== See also ==
- Sierra de Montánchez
- List of municipalities in Cáceres
