= Cabañeros National Park =

National park in Spain

- IUCN category II (national park)
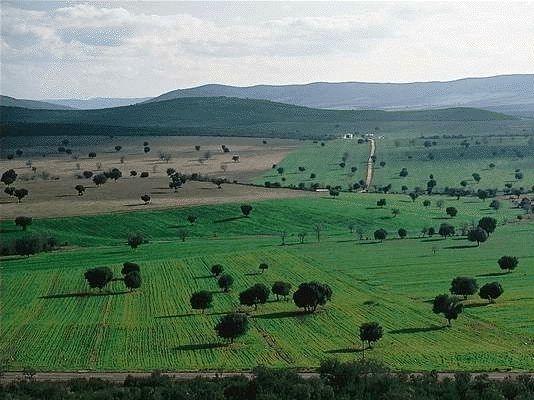
- A dehesa, traditional pastoral management in the park
- Location of Cabañeros
- Location: Navas de Estena, Retuerta del Bullaque, Alcoba de los Montes, Horcajo de los Montes, Hontanar.
- Nearest city: Toledo
- Coordinates: 39°23′47″N 4°29′14″W
- Area: 409 km^{2} (158 sq mi)
- Established: 20 November 1995
- Visitors: 75000 approx. (in 2007)
- Governing body: Parques, (Spanish Ministry of Environment)

Cabañeros National Park (in Spanish: Parque Nacional de Cabañeros) is a national park in the Montes de Toledo, Spain. It falls within two provinces, the northwest of Ciudad Real and the southwest of Toledo.

The Park was designated in 1995 and has an area of 390 square kilometres (150 sq mi). It lies between the Estena and Bullaque rivers, extending into the Chorito and Miraflores mountain ranges.

It is the best and largest surviving area of Iberian Mediterranean forest, with an enormous variety of plant species. It also includes sites of geological interest (Paleozoic sites known as Cámbrico y Ordovícico del Parque Nacional de Cabañeros).

The antipodes of the park are located in Tongariro National Park in New Zealand.

== Fauna ==
The fauna of the park is notable, both for its variety (276 species of vertebrates) and for the high percentage of endangered species. Mammals include the otter in the Estena river and four species of ungulates: wild boar, red deer, roe deer and (in the most forested areas) fallow deer.

The park is potentially a habitat for the Iberian lynx, a critically endangered feline. However, lynx have been sighted only intermittently in the area in recent years, perhaps because of a shortage of rabbits, the main prey species. The Toledo Mountains have been used as a site for the reintroduction of the lynx as part of a LIFE project.

The Park is a Special Protection Area for birdlife, and provides a home for the following notable species:

- Black stork (rare but not threatened)
- Eurasian black vulture (near threatened), second largest breeding population
- Spanish imperial eagle (threatened)

== Geology ==
In addition to the fauna and flora, Cabañeros has a third unique resource: its geology. In towns such as Navas de Estena you can visit areas with fossils from more than 400 million years ago, in the Ordovician, when this territory was sea.

The fossilized remains of the activity of the oldest giant worm discovered to date have recently been found in the Boquerón de Estena.

The predominant geological materials in the terrain are quartzite and, to a lesser extent, slate. Some rocky outcrops in the park are proposed as a "Global Geosite" (place of Spanish geological interest of international relevance) by the Geological and Mining Institute of Spain, with the name "PZ004: Cambrian and Ordovician of the Cabañeros National Park" within the group of geological contexts "Lower and Middle Paleozoic Stratigraphic Series".

== Conservation issues ==
The national park aims to develop sustainable tourism.

In theory there is a ban on hunting at Cabañeros, as at other Spanish national parks. However, some hunting has been allowed for purposes of "population control" (as opposed to sporting purposes).
