= San Pablo de los Montes =

Coordinates: 39.546°N 4.328°W

- municipality
- Flag Coat of arms

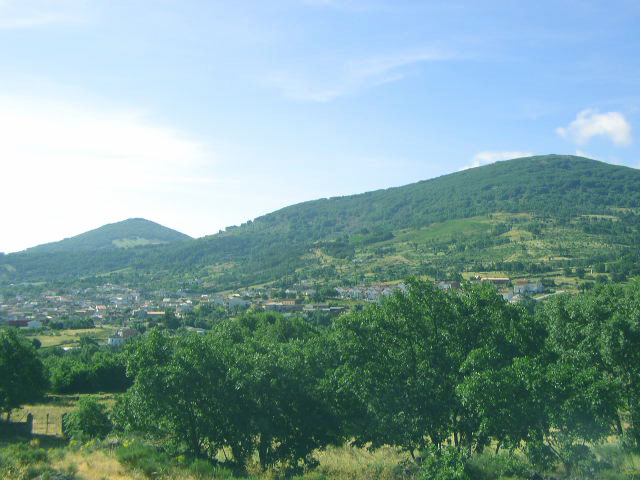
- San Pablo de los Montes below the Sierra de San Pablo
- Country: Spain
- Autonomous community: Castile-La Mancha
- Province: Toledo
- Municipality: San Pablo de los Montes

Area
  - Total: 101 km^{2} (39 sq mi)
- Elevation: 908 m (2,979 ft)

Population (2025-01-01)
  - Total: 1,627
  - Density: 16.1/km^{2} (41.7/sq mi)
- Time zone: UTC+1 (CET)
  - Summer (DST): UTC+2 (CEST)

San Pablo de los Montes is a municipality located in the province of Toledo, Castile-La Mancha, Spain. According to the 2006 census (INE), the municipality has a population of 2282 inhabitants.

San Pablo de los Montes is located below the Sierra de San Pablo, part of the Montes de Toledo range.
