= Zarza de Montánchez =

Coordinates: 39°15′N 6°02′W

Zarza de Montánchez, Spain
- municipality
- Flag Coat of arms
- Interactive map of Zarza de Montánchez, Spain
- Country: Spain
- Autonomous community: Extremadura
- Province: Cáceres
- Municipality: Zarza de Montánchez

Area
  - Total: 36 km^{2} (14 sq mi)
- Elevation: 450 m (1,480 ft)

Population (2025-01-01)
  - Total: 504
  - Density: 14/km^{2} (36/sq mi)
- Time zone: UTC+1 (CET)
  - Summer (DST): UTC+2 (CEST)

Zarza de Montánchez is a municipality located in the Sierra de Montánchez area, province of Cáceres, Extremadura, Spain. According to the 2006 census (INE), the municipality has a population of 631 inhabitants.

== See also ==
- List of municipalities in Cáceres
