= Serra de São Mamede Natural Park =

Protected area in Portalegre District, Portugal

- IUCN category V (protected landscape/seascape)
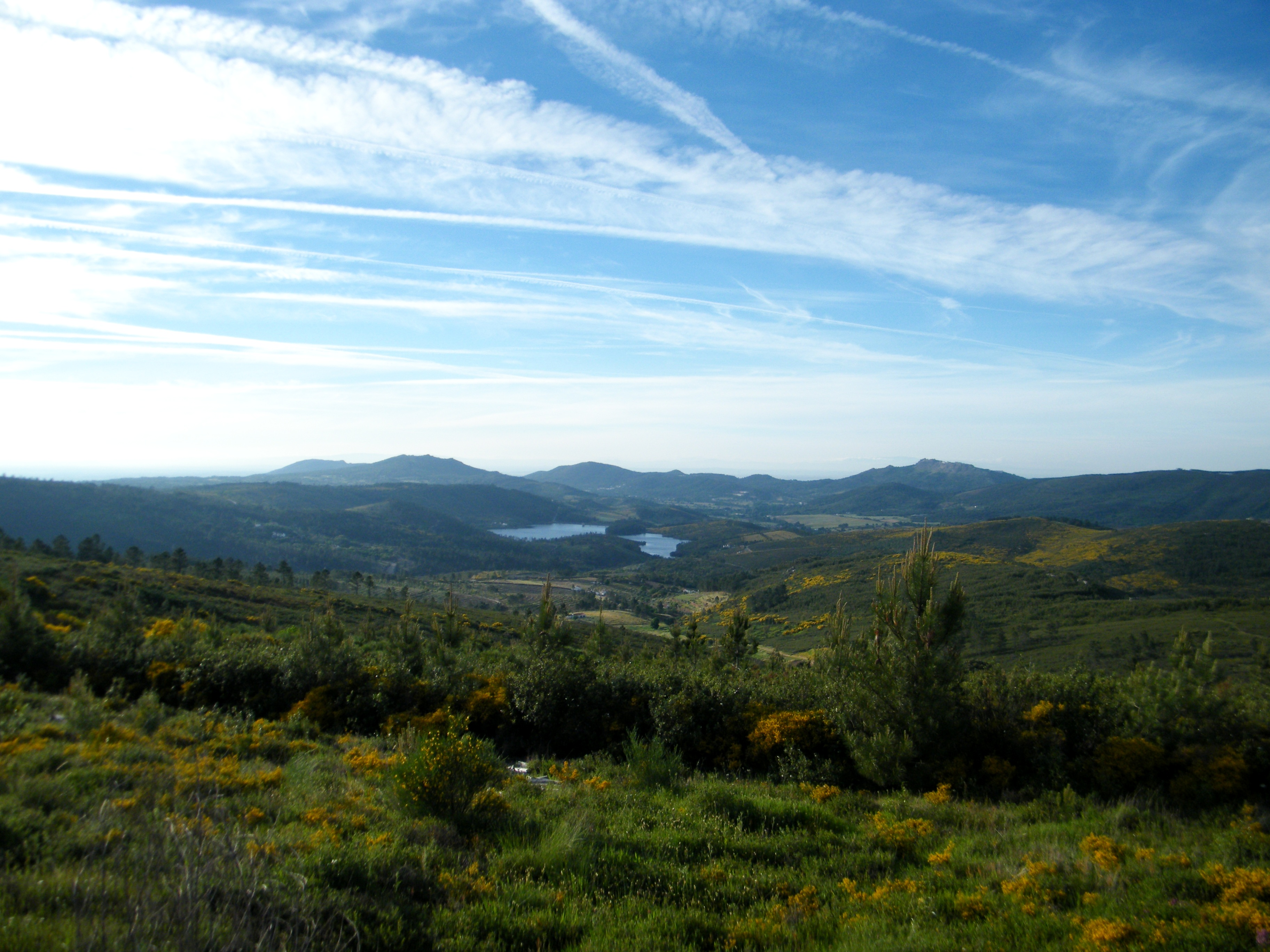

- Location within Portugal
- Location: Portalegre District, Portugal
- Coordinates: 39°20′42″N 7°21′01″W
- Area: 560.6 km^{2} (216.4 sq mi)
- Max. elevation: 1,025 m (3,363 ft)
- Established: April 14, 1989
- Visitors: 4,476 (in 2017-2020 (average))
- Governing body: ICNF

Serra de São Mamede Natural Park is a natural park in the Serra de São Mamede range, Portugal. It is one of the 30 areas which are officially under protection in the country.

== Climate ==
The São Mamede Range rises from the Alentejo region of Portugal, which has a strongly Mediterranean climate, with hot summers and mild winters. At higher elevations, and particularly on slopes with northern aspects, the climate becomes cooler and wetter, transitioning into a warm-summer Mediterranean climate.

In comparison with the surrounding region, the orientation and altitude of the range result in cooler temperatures, more frequent occurrences of fog, and orographic lift that produces higher levels of precipitation.

== Flora ==
The park's variations in topography support plants from regions of Portugal with both Mediterranean and oceanic climates. Over 800 species of plants are found within the natural park.

There are extensive areas of cork oak and Pyrenean oak. Holm oak is found on xeric sites. Sweet chestnut grows at higher elevations.

There are also large areas of olive, maritime pine, and Eucalyptus plantations.

== Fauna ==
Within the area one can find the European otter, Cabrera's vole and, mainly in the north, the Iberian lynx. The Iberian wolf also lives in the area in small numbers.
