= Serra de São Mamede =

Protected area in Portugal

- Saint Mammes Range
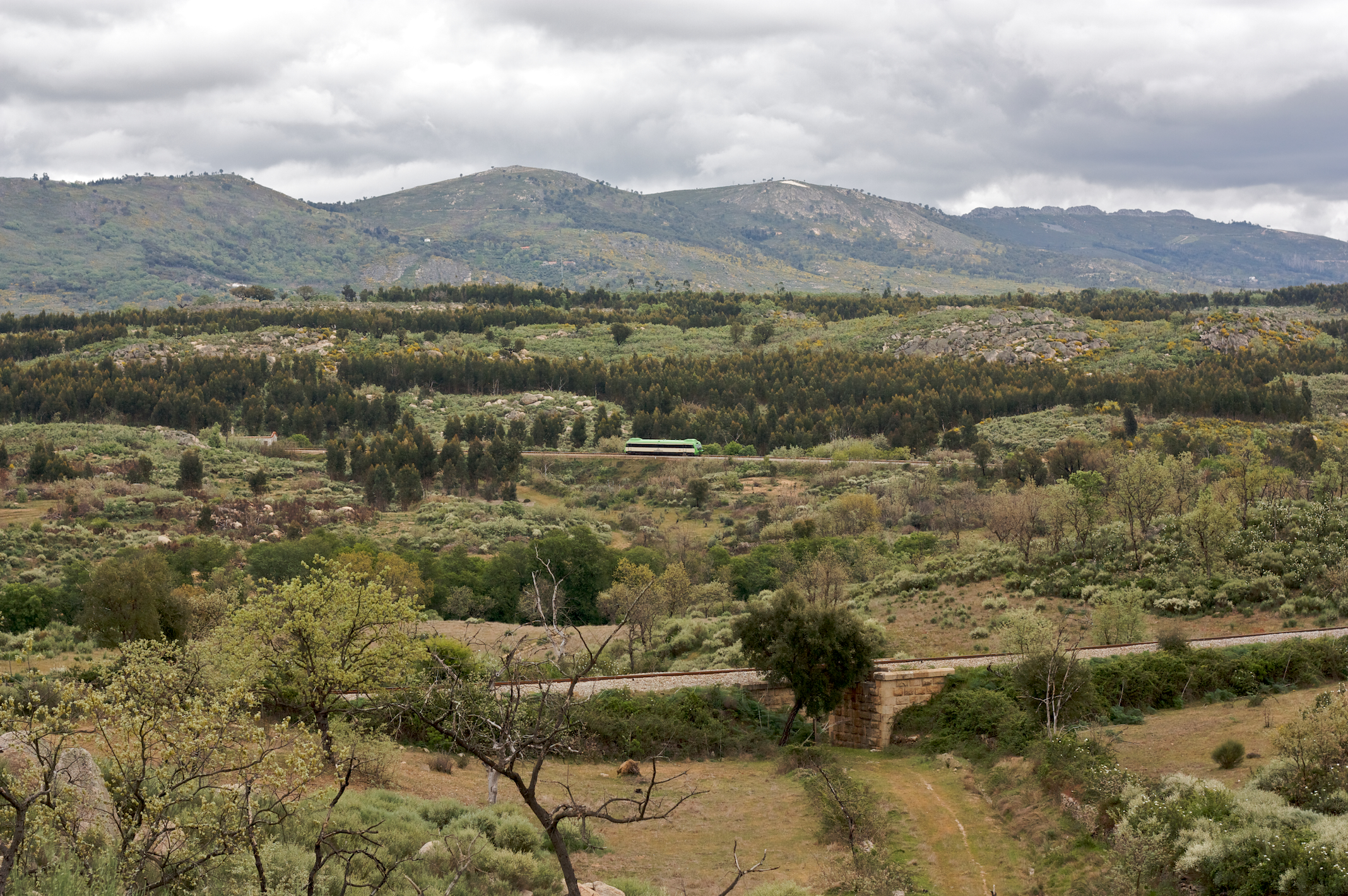
- The Serra de São Mamede near Castelo de Vide

Highest point
- Peak: Pico de São Mamede
- Elevation: 1,025 m (3,363 ft)
- Isolation: 75.65 km
- Coordinates: 39°12′54″N 6°7′25″W

Dimensions
- Length: 25 km (16 mi) NW/SE
- Width: 9 km (5.6 mi) NE/SW

Geography
- Location within Portugal
- Country: Portugal
- Region: Portalegre District
- Range coordinates: 39°17′N 7°21′W
- Parent range: Montes de Toledo

Geology
- Orogeny: Alpine
- Rock age(s): Ordovician, Silurian and Devonian
- Rock type(s): Quartzite, Dolomite

Serra de São Mamede (English: Saint Mammes Range) is a mountain range in Portalegre District, Portugal. This range is named after Saint Mammes. Together with the Serra de Arraiolos, the Serra de São Mamede is one of the few places in the Alentejo region where there might be snow in the winter.

This mountain range separates the drainage basin of the Tagus to the north from the basin of the Guadiana to the south. The main rivers that have their sources in this range are the Sever and Nisa, flowing towards the Tagus, as well as the Caia River and its tributary, the Arronches, flowing towards the Guadiana.

The town of Marvão is an ancient fortified town located on a ridge of the range. Its emblematic castle is an archetype of medieval castle-building. It dates back to the times of the Reconquista, the reconquest of the Iberian Peninsula from the Moors. Besides Marvão, Portalegre, Castelo de Vide, Arronches and Alegrete are other important towns in the area of the range.

== Description ==
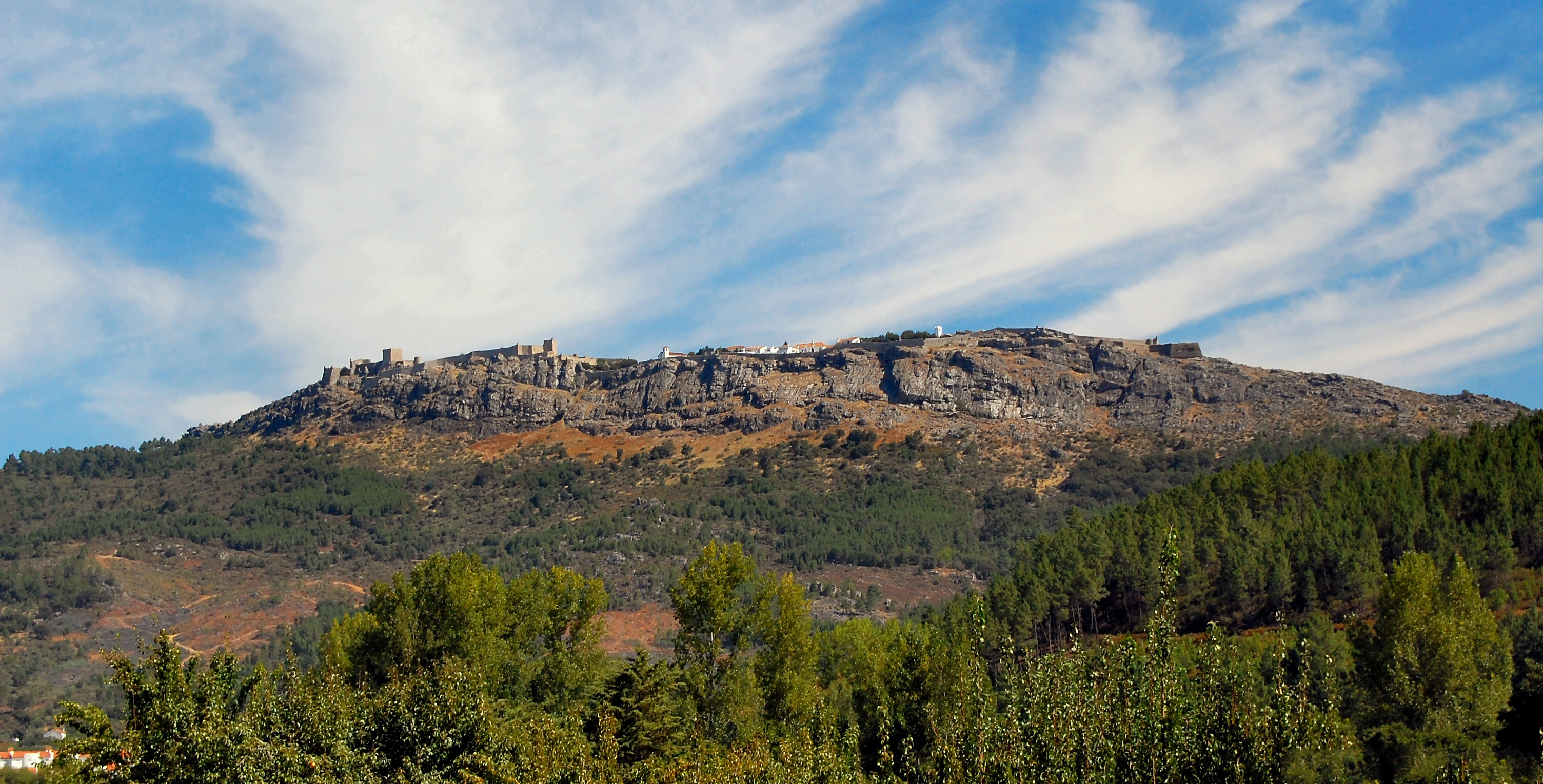
View of Marvão atop the range

The Serra de São Mamede stretches for about 25 km in a NE/SW direction between Castelo de Vide and La Rabaza, Cáceres Province, Extremadura, at the border with Spain. It rises in the area of the Alto Alentejo to the west of the parallel Sierra de San Pedro across the border and is relatively lower than the latter. Its highest point is 1,025 m (3,363 ft) high Pico de São Mamede, the highest summit in Continental Portugal south of the Tagus. Other important peaks are Fria, Pico de Marvão and the Penha da Castelo de Vide. Physiographically this range is part of the western end of the greater Montes de Toledo, one of the main mountain systems of the Iberian Peninsula.

The climate of the range is between the Atlantic and the Mediterranean climate. Shrubland and trees such as cork oak and Pyrenean oak are prevalent in the areas covered with natural vegetation. Some of the higher altitudes have rocky outcrops where shrub grows between the crags. Holm oak is found on xeric sites and Sweet chestnut grows at higher elevations. On the lower slopes there are large areas of olive and maritime pine, as well as scattered patches planted with non-native species such as eucalyptus.

The Serra de São Mamede Natural Park is a protected area located within the limits of the range. The park features one of the largest bat colonies in Europe. The griffon vulture and Bonelli's eagle are also found in the range.

=== Geology ===
Quartzite and Dolomite are predominant, especially in the higher levels of the range. Granite is present in the southwestern area of the mountains between Portalegre and Fortios.

== See also ==
- Geography of Portugal
- Geology of the Iberian Peninsula
