= Montánchez =

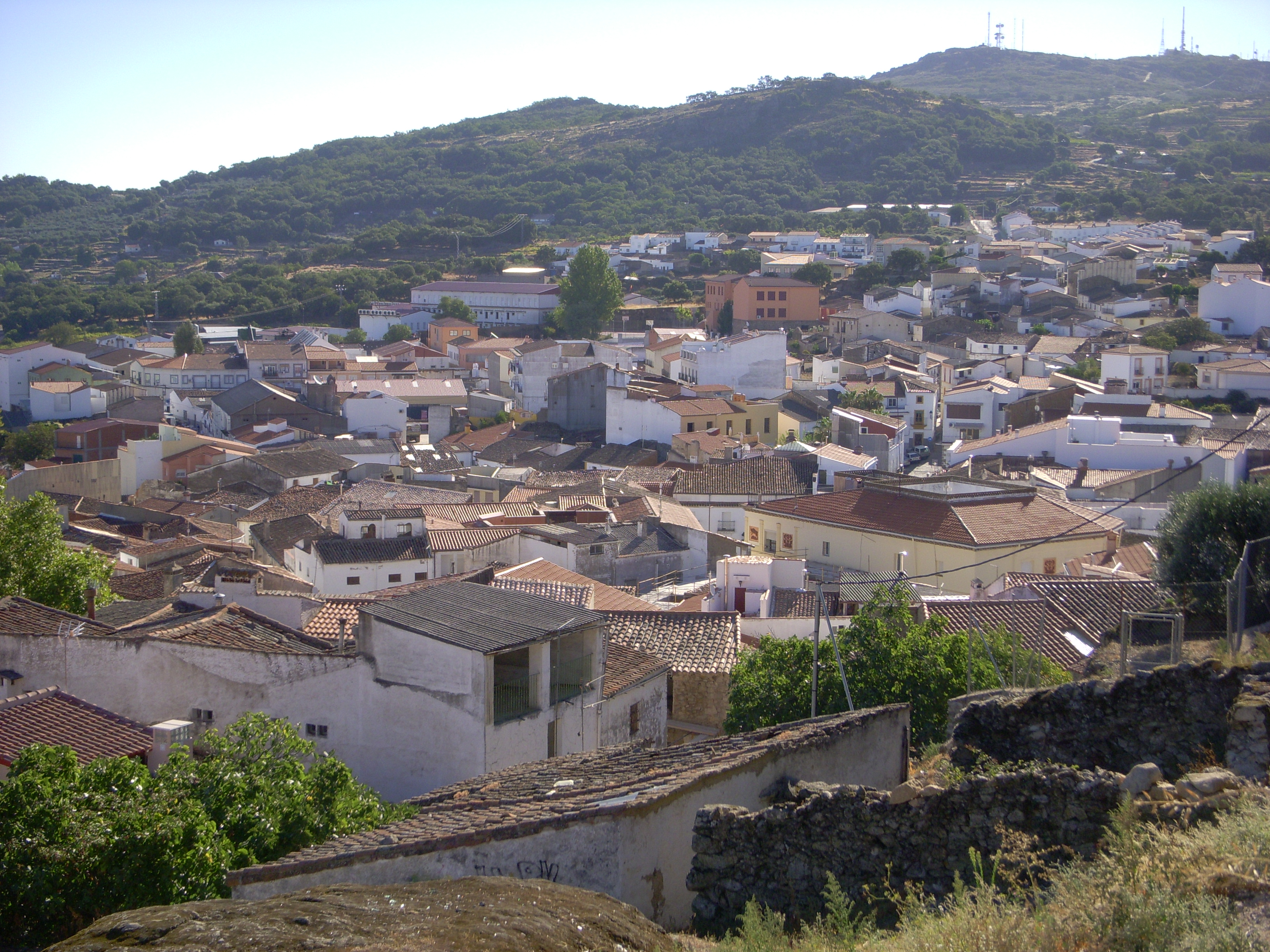
- View of Montanchez

- Flag Coat of arms

- Location in Spain.
- Country: Spain
- Autonomous community: Cáceres

Area
  - Total: 112.66 km^{2} (43.50 sq mi)
- Elevation: 705 m (2,313 ft)

Population (2025-01-01)
  - Total: 1,597
  - Density: 14.18/km^{2} (36.71/sq mi)
- Time zone: UTC+1 (CET)
  - Summer (DST): UTC+2 (CEST)
- Website: www.montanchez.es

Montánchez is a municipality located in the province of Cáceres, Extremadura, Spain. It is situated at 39°13′N 6°09′W, some 702 metres above sea level. The municipality has an approximate population of just over 2,000.

The town sits in the Sierra de Montánchez, a small mountain range rising above the plains of Extremadura. Its elevated position has earned it the nickname "the balcony of Extremadura".

The town's economy relies principally on agriculture. It is one of the main centres in Spain for the production of jamón ibérico, and also produces wine.

== History ==
Although there is evidence of prehistoric settlement, the first major residents were the Romans, who founded the town in the 1st century AD. Moorish invaders captured the town in 713, taking advantage of its strategic location in the mountains to build a castle, which still dominates the village today. The town reverted to Christianity in 1230, when it was taken by Alfonso IX. The castle was updated at this time, but continued to form an important defensive line.

== See also ==
- List of municipalities in Cáceres
