= Santiago de Alcántara =

Coordinates: 39°38′N 7°24′W

Santiago de Alcántara, Spain
- municipality
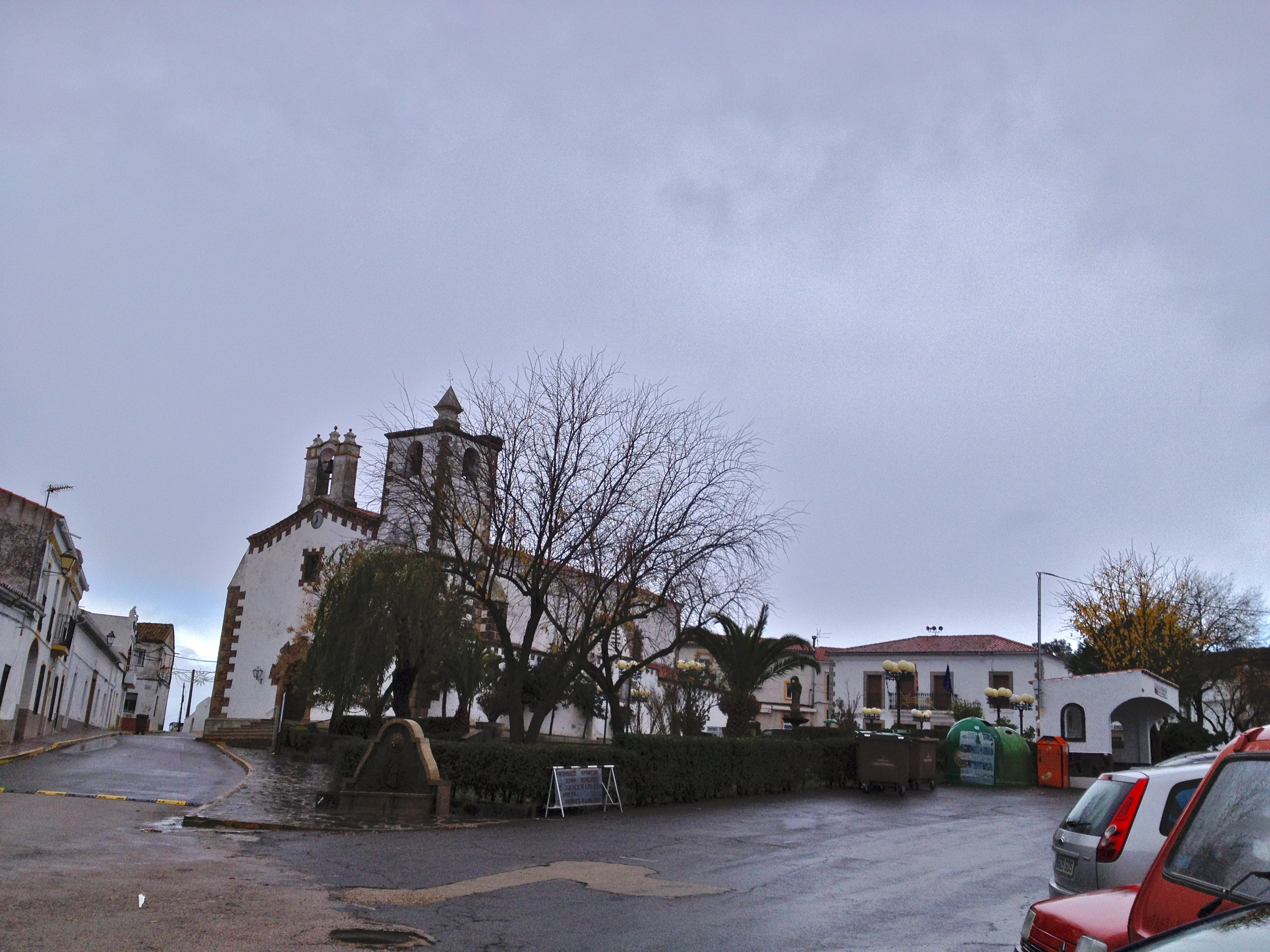

- Coat of arms
- Interactive map of Santiago de Alcántara, Spain
- Country: Spain
- Autonomous community: Extremadura
- Province: Cáceres
- Municipality: Santiago de Alcántara

Area
  - Total: 95 km^{2} (37 sq mi)
- Elevation: 342 m (1,122 ft)

Population (2025-01-01)
  - Total: 454
  - Density: 4.8/km^{2} (12/sq mi)
- Time zone: UTC+1 (CET)
  - Summer (DST): UTC+2 (CEST)

Santiago de Alcántara is a municipality located in the province of Cáceres, Extremadura, Spain. According to the 2006 census (INE), the municipality has a population of 724 inhabitants.

== See also ==
- List of municipalities in Cáceres
