= Alcuéscar =

- Flag Coat of arms

- Location in Spain.
- Coordinates: 39°10′48″N 6°31′42″W
- Country: Spain
- Autonomous community: Extremadura
- Province: Cáceres
- Comarca: Tierra de Montánchez

Government
  - Mayor: Tierra de Montánchez

Area
  - Total: 108 km^{2} (42 sq mi)
- Elevation: 488 m (1,601 ft)

Population (2025-01-01)
  - Total: 2,447
  - Density: 22.7/km^{2} (58.7/sq mi)
- Time zone: UTC+1 (CET)
  - Summer (DST): UTC+2 (CEST)

Alcuéscar (Spanish: [alˈkwes.kaɾ]) is a municipality located in the province of Cáceres, Extremadura, Spain. The town is on the Silver Route (the Via de la Plata) branch of the Camino de Santiago, the pilgrimage trail to the burial place of St. James the Apostle.

The most noticeable feature of the small town is a convent and affiliated care facility for disabled people. The convent and church have large gardens. The services are very beautiful, and include special blessings for travelers and pilgrims. The convent is known for its hospitality, running an albergue (pilgrim's shelter), including a donativo (donation suggested) meal. They are also one of the primary sources of pilgrim's shells for people walking this route of the Camino de Santiago, and their style of shells are distinctive.

The church itself dates to the turn of the twentieth century, but has classical architecture, appearing to be a castle. Like an older castle, this building was mostly constructed by hand. This church has a proud place in history as a place of succor for the poor and starving during the Spanish depression, World War I, and under Franco's regime. The priest who served in Alcuéscar in that era is now Blessed, and is expected to be confirmed as a Saint in the near future.

== See also ==
- List of municipalities in Cáceres
