= Carbajo =

Coordinates: 39°36′N 7°11′W

Carbajo, Spain
- municipality
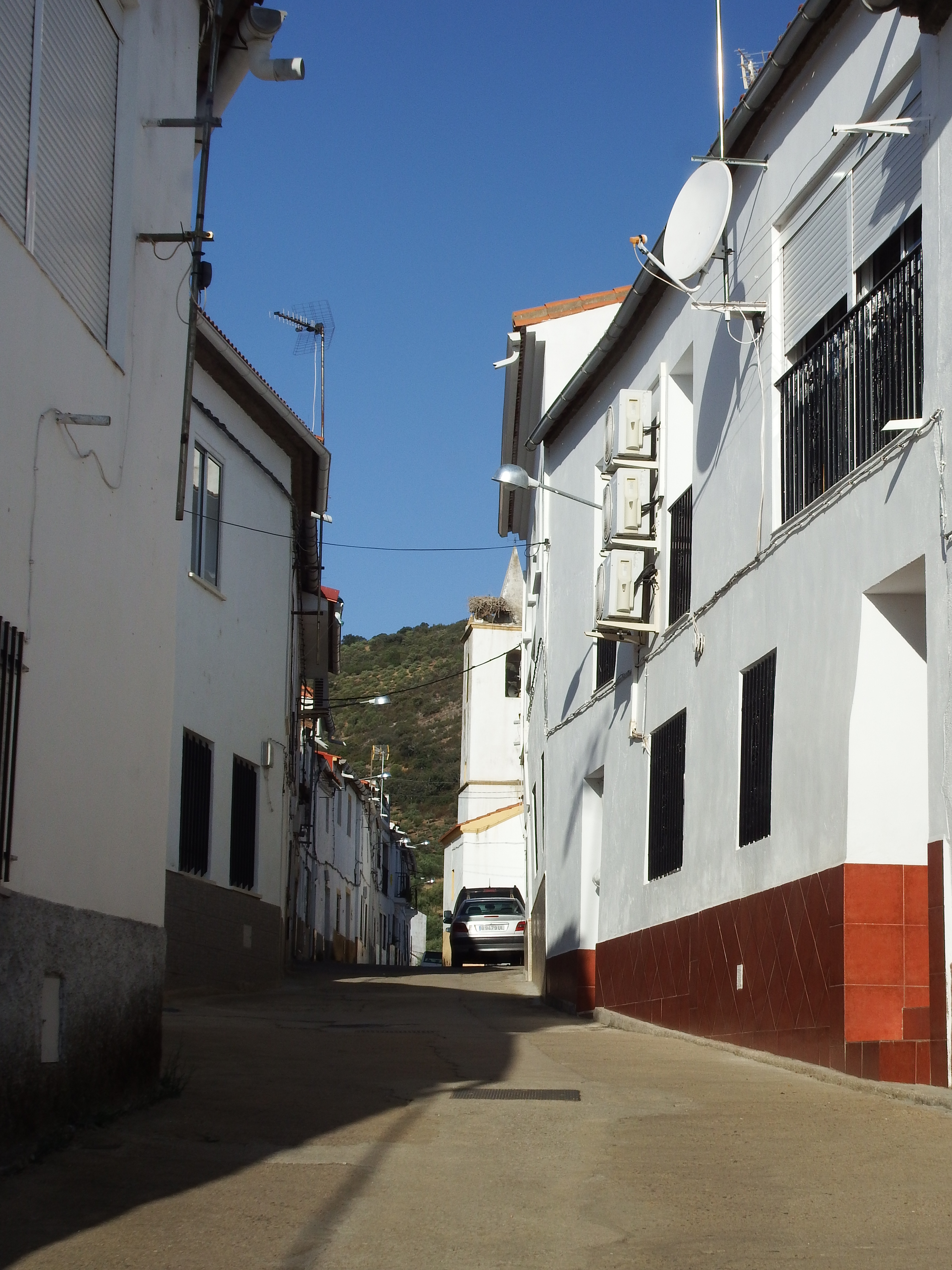

- Coat of arms
- Interactive map of Carbajo, Spain
- Country: Spain
- Autonomous community: Extremadura
- Province: Cáceres
- Municipality: Carbajo

Area
  - Total: 28 km^{2} (11 sq mi)

Population (2025-01-01)
  - Total: 183
  - Density: 6.5/km^{2} (17/sq mi)
- Time zone: UTC+1 (CET)
  - Summer (DST): UTC+2 (CEST)

Carbajo is a municipality located in the province of Cáceres, Extremadura, Spain. According to the 2006 census (INE), the municipality has a population of 253 inhabitants.

== See also ==
- List of municipalities in Cáceres
