= Bojan Krkić =

Spanish footballer (born 1990)

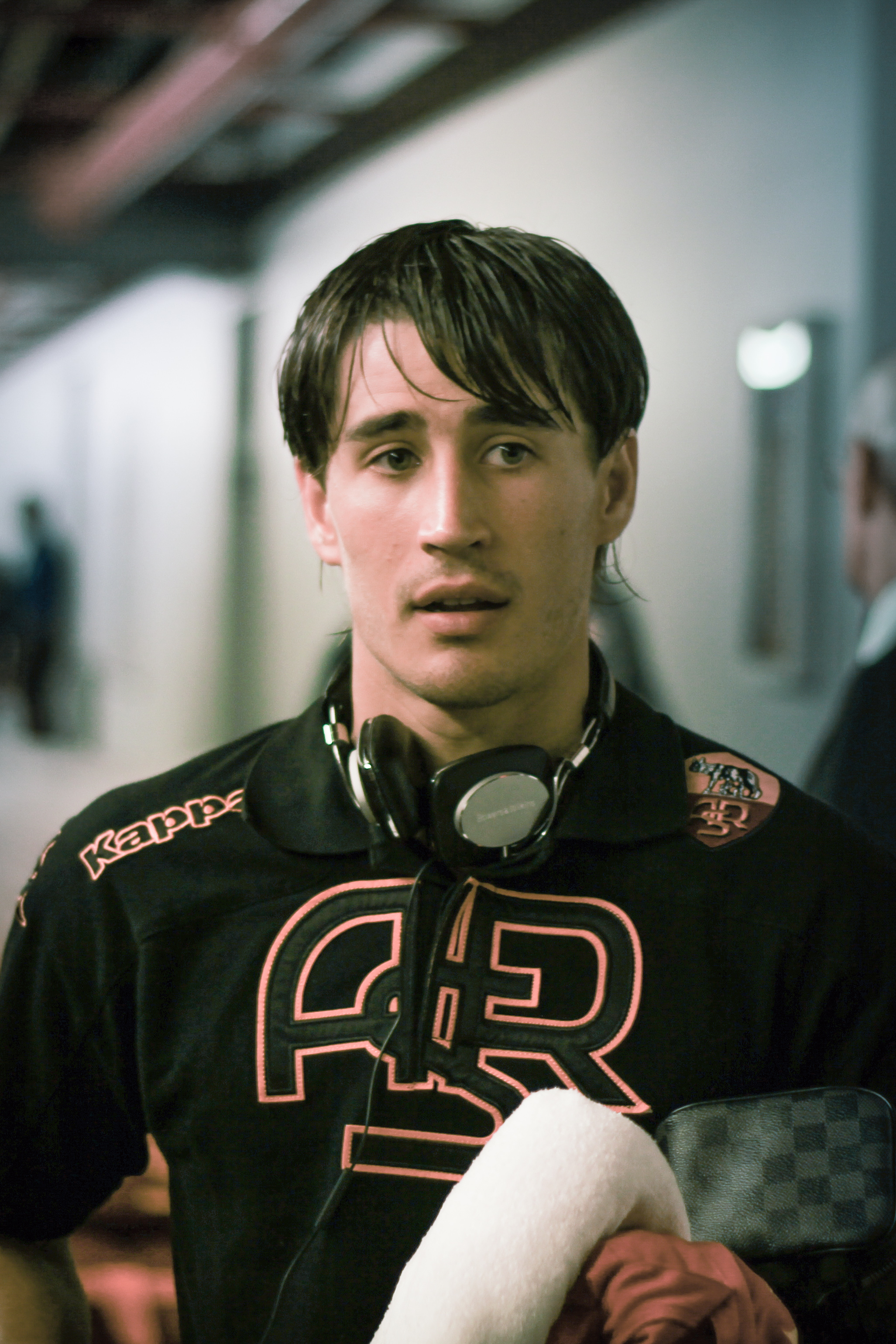
- Bojan with Roma in 2012

Personal information
- Full name: Bojan Krkić Pérez
- Date of birth: 28 August 1990 (age 36)
- Place of birth: Linyola, Spain
- Height: 1.70 m (5 ft 7 in)
- Positions: Forward; winger

Youth career
- Bellpuig
- 1999–2006: Barcelona

Senior career*
Years	Team	Apps	(Gls)
2006–2007	Barcelona B	22	(10)
2007–2011	Barcelona	104	(26)
2011–2013	Roma	33	(7)
2012–2013	→ AC Milan (loan)	19	(3)
2013–2014	Barcelona	0	(0)
2013–2014	→ Ajax (loan)	24	(4)
2014–2019	Stoke City	74	(15)
2017	→ Mainz 05 (loan)	11	(1)
2017–2018	→ Alavés (loan)	12	(0)
2019–2020	Montreal Impact	25	(7)
2021–2023	Vissel Kobe	20	(1)
Total		345	(74)

International career
2006–2007	Spain U17	20	(16)
2007–2011	Spain U21	21	(4)
2007–2019	Catalonia	8	(7)
2008	Spain	1	(0)
Medal record
Men's football
Representing Spain
UEFA European Under-17 Championship
Winner	2007 Belgium
UEFA European Under-21 Championship
Winner	2011 Denmark
- * Club domestic league appearances and goals

Bojan Krkić Pérez (Note: Spanish pronunciation: [ˈboʝaŋ ˈkiɾkitʃ ˈpeɾeθ]; Serbian Cyrillic: Бојан Кркић Перез, pronounced [bǒjan kr̩̂kitɕ pěrez]) (born 28 August 1990), also known as simply Bojan, is a Spanish former professional footballer who played as a forward or winger.

Bojan began his career at Barcelona after progressing through the youth ranks at La Masia. His early promise saw him make his first-team debut at the age of 17 years and 19 days, breaking the record set by Lionel Messi. In his debut season, he scored 12 goals in 48 matches. In total, he spent four seasons at the Camp Nou, scoring 41 goals in 162 games before he was sold in July 2011 to Italian team Roma for a fee of €12 million. While in Rome, he scored seven goals in 37 appearances in the 2011–12 season, and then spent the 2012–13 season on loan at AC Milan, where he scored three goals in 27 games.

Roma did not exercise their option of an additional €28 million to sign Bojan definitively, and so Barcelona re-signed him for €13 million. He spent the 2013–14 season on loan at Dutch club Ajax with whom he helped win the Eredivisie title. In July 2014, Bojan joined the English club Stoke City for €1.8 million. After subsequent loans to play on the European continent, once for Mainz 05 in 2017 and in Spain for Alavés in 2018, Krkić then played in North America for a season for the Montreal Impact. His final club was Vissel Kobe in Japan, where he played for two seasons, before being released by the club in January 2023; he retired from professional football two months later.

As a Spanish youth international, he won European Championships with the Under-17 team in 2007 and the Under-21 team in 2011, as well as earning his only cap for the senior team in 2008. He has also represented the Catalan national team eight times since 2007.

== Club career ==
=== Early years ===
Born in Linyola, Lleida, Catalonia, to a Serbian father, Bojan Krkić Sr., who was a professional footballer for Serbian team OFK Beograd, and a Catalan mother, Maria Lluïsa Pérez, Bojan played for Barcelona's youth teams from 1999 to 2006. A quick striker with quite notable dribbling skills, it was reported that he scored over 900 goals for various youth teams since joining the club as an eight-year-old, breaking Lionel Messi's record. He then played the 2006–07 season with the Barcelona B team until he signed a professional contract with the first team upon turning 17. Bojan played his first match with Barcelona on 24 April 2007, scoring a goal in a friendly match against Egyptian club Al Ahly.

=== Barcelona ===
==== 2007–08 season ====
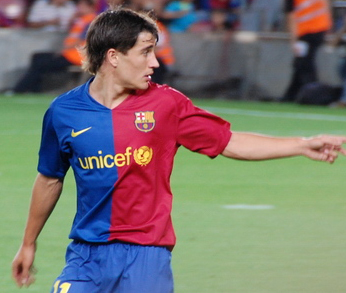
Bojan playing in the 2008 Joan Gamper Trophy against Boca Juniors

On 16 September 2007 (at 17 years and 19 days), Bojan made his official debut for Barcelona against Osasuna, replacing Giovani dos Santos in the 78th minute and breaking Lionel Messi's record of the youngest Barcelona player to feature in a La Liga match. Three days later, he made his UEFA Champions League debut against Lyon, coming on at the 88th minute for Messi. He was, at the time, the youngest Barcelona player ever to feature in a Champions League game, at 17 years and 22 days. He made his second Champions League appearance on 2 October, coming on at the 81st minute for Ronaldinho against VfB Stuttgart. On 20 October 2007 (at 17 years and 53 days), Bojan made his first league start for Barcelona away to Villarreal and scored in the 25th minute. It was his first goal for the club's first team and it made him the youngest ever goalscorer for Barcelona in a league match.

Bojan scored his first ever Champions League goal on 1 April 2008 (at 17 years and 217 days) against Schalke 04, netting the only goal in the first (away) leg of the quarter-finals, making him the first person born in the 1990s to score in the Champions League, and the youngest player to score in the knockout phase. Bojan finished the season with a record of ten goals, breaking Raúl's record of most goals scored in a debut season.

==== 2008–09 season ====
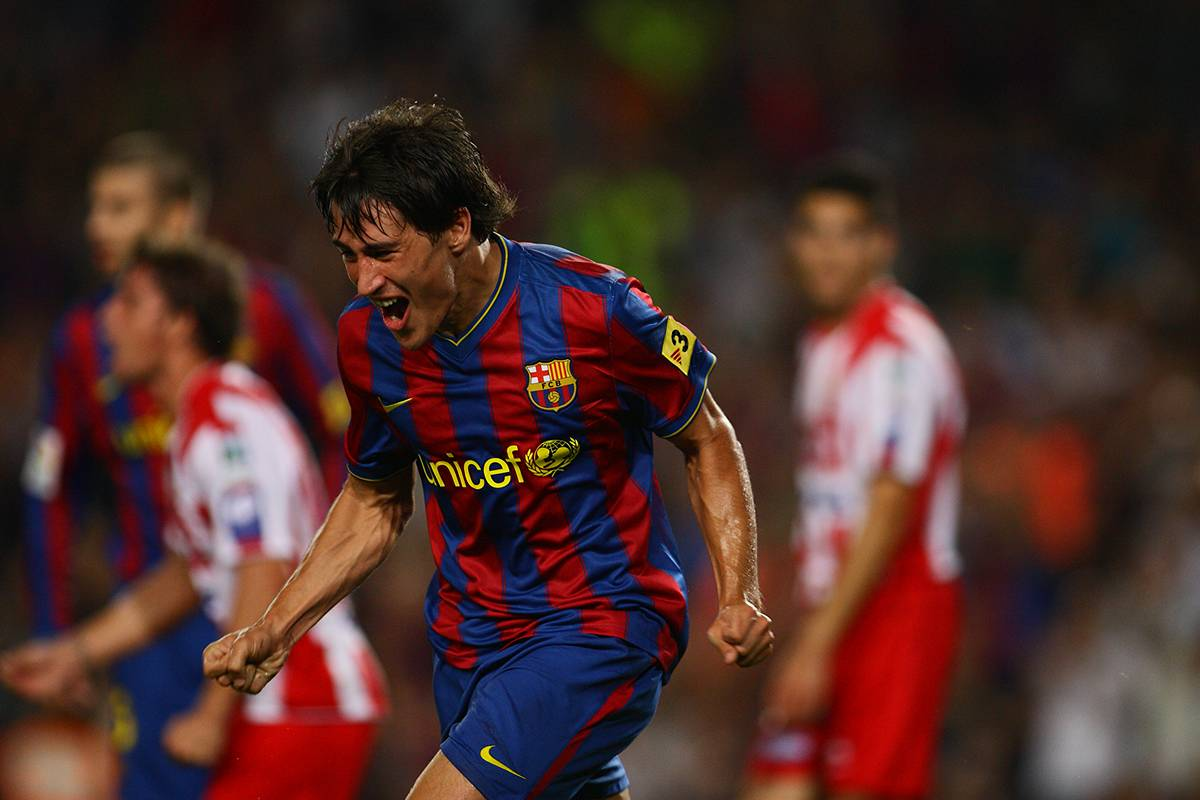
Bojan celebrates his goal against Sporting Gijón on 31 August 2009 at Camp Nou

Upon the departure of Gianluca Zambrotta, Bojan was handed the number 11 shirt. After 14 games (13 of which he entered as a substitute), Bojan ended a goal drought by netting a brace against Almería in a 2–0 victory. Despite featuring less compared to the previous season, Bojan helped Barcelona to their 19th La Liga title. He also aided Barcelona to their first Copa del Rey win in 11 years by scoring five goals in the competition, including one in the final against Athletic Bilbao. Bojan was an unused substitute in the 2009 UEFA Champions League Final against Manchester United, which Barcelona won 2–0 and saw them cap off a treble-winning campaign. Bojan's three goals in ten appearances throughout the competition saw him finish as the equal sixth-highest goalscorer for the season.

==== 2009–10 season ====
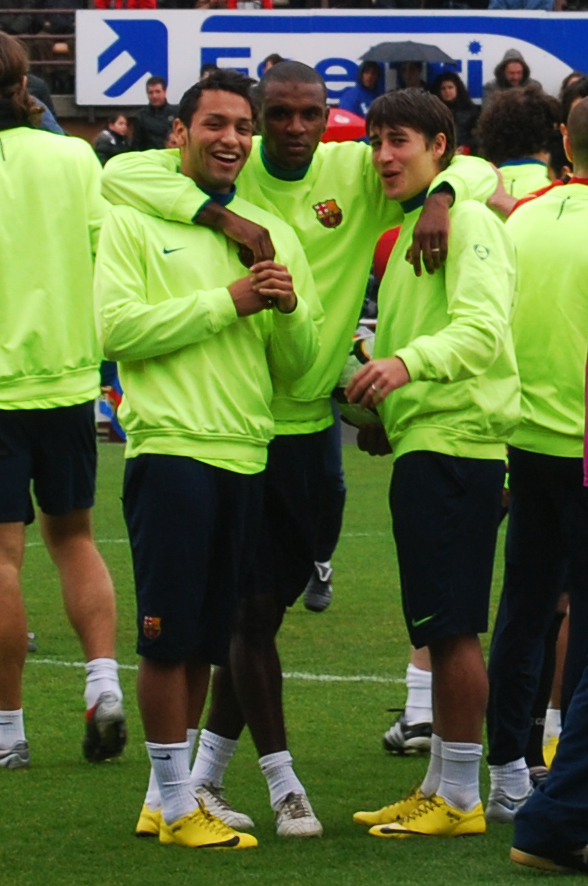
Bojan (right) in training in February 2010, with Jeffrén and Eric Abidal

On the first day of the 2009–10 La Liga campaign against Atlético Madrid, Bojan scored a header in the 18th minute courtesy of a flick-on from Seydou Keita. Barcelona went on to win the game by a scoreline of 3–0. On 10 November, he scored twice in the second leg of the Copa del Rey against Cultural Leonesa, helping his team to a 5–0 victory. Coming off the bench as a late substitute for Andrés Iniesta, Bojan scored his first and only Champions League goal of the season against VfB Stuttgart. He began finding the net more often towards the end of the season; seven of his eight league goals for the season came from the last 12 games.

==== 2010–11 season ====
Bojan took the number 9 shirt after Zlatan Ibrahimović moved on loan to A.C. Milan. The season saw Bojan find himself behind Lionel Messi, Pedro and newly-signed David Villa in the pecking order. In the match against Ceuta in the Copa del Rey, Bojan captained Barcelona for the first time in an official match. He came off of the bench against Almería to score the sixth and eighth goals in an 8–0 win and later came on against Real Madrid in El Clásico to set up the fifth goal for Jeffrén in the famous 5–0 win. In a La Liga match against Real Sociedad, Bojan again came off the bench to score the fifth goal in 5–0 win. He scored a crucial league goal from a Dani Alves assist for Barcelona against Sevilla in a 1–1 draw, then marked his 100th league appearance for the Catalan club with a goal against Getafe.

=== Roma ===
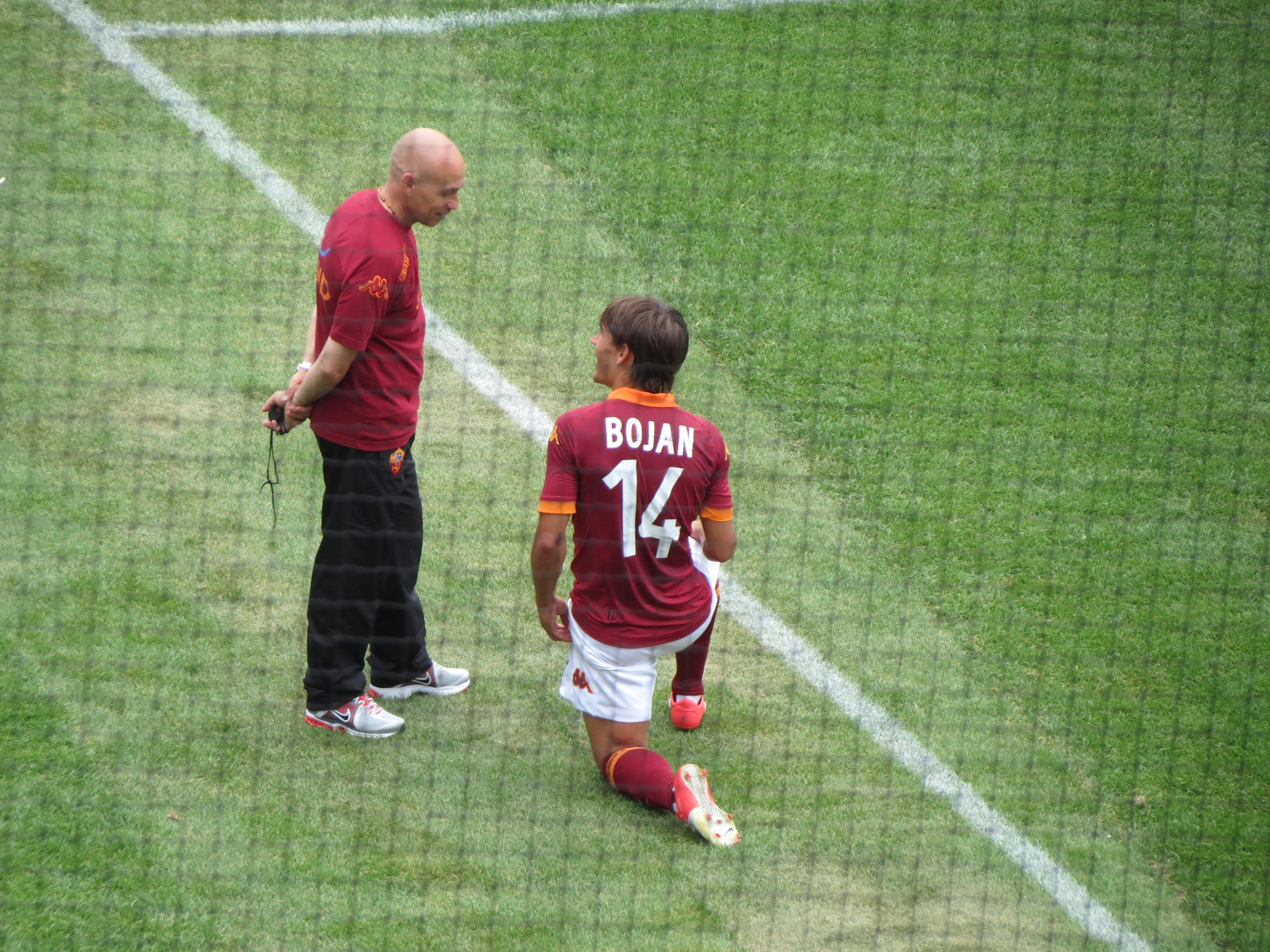
Bojan with Roma in July 2012

On 22 July 2011, Italian club Roma bought Bojan for a fee of €12 million. The sale included a buyback clause giving Barcelona the option to re-sign Bojan in 2012 or obligatory in 2013, although with the option of Roma paying an additional €28 million to retain the player. He made his unofficial debut on 3 August 2011 against Vasas in Budapest. He scored his first goal from an assist from Daniele De Rossi for Roma against Atalanta on 1 October 2011. He made 33 league appearances for Roma in his first season with the club, scoring seven times in total.

==== Loan to A.C. Milan ====
On 29 August 2012, Bojan joined A.C. Milan on a season-long loan from Roma. Barcelona later announced that the move would not affect the prior buyback agreement between Roma and them. Milan CEO Adriano Galliani, however, stated that a new agreement was worked out so that Milan have an option to sign the player at the end of the season, but Barcelona would still retain their buyback option. Bojan made his debut for Milan on 1 September, coming off the bench during the second half of a 3–1 away win over Bologna. He scored his first goal for Milan against Chievo on 3 November 2012, the third of a 5–1 win at the San Siro.

=== Return to Barcelona ===
Following the 2012–13 season in Italy, Bojan returned to his former club Barcelona for €13 million, having made 19 league appearances for Milan, and scoring three goals. He revealed his desire for more playing time, or otherwise interest to play for a club where he will receive more minutes. Milan decided not to extend their loan of the young player, as they were not able to guarantee him minutes, while Roma did not exercise their option of additional €28 million to sign Bojan definitively. He was free to find an alternative club to play for if he pleased, and talks began with Ajax, Feyenoord and PSV Eindhoven.

==== Loan to Ajax ====
On 6 July 2013, it was announced that Ajax had signed Bojan on a one-year loan deal, with an option for a second year loan spell from Barcelona. Director of football Marc Overmars and CEO Michael Kinsbergen flew into Barcelona a day prior to finalize the deal. Bojan explained that conversations with Johan Cruyff had influenced his decision to move to Ajax, as well as the opportunity to play in the Champions League. Bojan made his debut for his new club on 13 July 2013 in a pre-season friendly encounter against Waalwijk. The match ended in a 5–1 victory for Ajax at the Mandemakers Stadion, as he was substituted on for Danny Hoesen in the 60th minute, assisting Boban Lazić in the final goal for the Amsterdam team in the closing minutes of the game. He scored his first goal for Ajax in another pre-season friendly encounter, this time against Werder Bremen on 19 July 2013, scoring the second goal for Ajax in the 43rd minute in the 3–2 away win in Germany.

On 27 July 2013, Bojan won his first trophy with Ajax, winning the Johan Cruyff Shield (Dutch Super Cup) against AZ, 3–2 after extra time. He started the match on the right wing, playing for 61 minutes before being substituted off for Lucas Andersen, as Ajax acquired their eighth Dutch Super Cup title overall. Following a hamstring injury sustained on 29 September 2013 in a 6–0 victory over Go Ahead Eagles, Bojan scored his first regular season goal after eight weeks of absence on 1 December 2013 in a 4–0 victory in The Hague over Den Haag in the 90th minute of the match. On 8 May 2014, it was announced that Ajax would waive the option to extend Bojan's contract, with Bojan returning to Barcelona, having scored four goals in 24 regular season matches (5 goals in 32 matches overall) and helping Ajax to secure their 33rd Eredivisie title and fourth consecutive.

=== Stoke City ===
==== 2014–17 ====
On 22 July 2014, Bojan signed a four-year contract with Premier League team Stoke City for €1.8 million. Manager Mark Hughes said: "Anyone who knows European football will be aware of him as a player and the fact that he sees his future at Stoke City is really exciting."

Bojan scored his first goal for Stoke in a 1–2 friendly defeat against Schalke 04 on 29 July 2014. He also scored in friendlies against Blackburn Rovers and Real Betis. He made his league debut at home on 16 August, playing the full 90 minutes of a 1–0 defeat to Aston Villa. BBC Sport said that Bojan "impressed" for Stoke in the match. However, after a couple of ineffective performances, Hughes stated that he was prepared to give Bojan time to adapt to English football. He returned to the starting line-up on 1 November 2014 in a 2–2 draw against West Ham United. Eight days after that, he scored his first Stoke goal to open a 2–1 win at Tottenham Hotspur, a dribble followed by a shot from outside the penalty area. On 6 December 2014, Bojan scored in a 3–2 win over Arsenal. On 26 December, he won a contested penalty in the first half at Goodison Park when referee Lee Mason declared that he had been fouled by Everton's James McCarthy; Bojan then converted the spot-kick past Tim Howard for the only goal of the game. Bojan scored in a 1–0 victory against Leicester City on 17 January 2015. Nine days later, he scored his fifth goal of the season in a 4–1 victory in the FA Cup fourth round against Rochdale, but was later substituted having suffered a knee injury which ruled him out for the remainder of the 2014–15 season.

Bojan returned from injury in July 2015 playing in a pre-season friendly against Brentford. He made his first league start for over eight months on 19 September 2015, scoring in a 2–2 draw against Leicester City. A month later, he won a fourth-minute penalty when fouled by Swansea City's Ashley Williams, and dispatched it past Łukasz Fabiański for the only goal of the game at the Liberty Stadium. Bojan signed a new contract with Stoke in February committing him to the club until the summer of 2020. Towards the end of the campaign, however, he lost his place in the team, spending most of his time on the bench. In total, he played 31 times for Stoke in 2015–16, scoring seven goals as the Potters finished in ninth position.

Bojan struggled for playing time under Hughes in 2016–17 starting just five league matches in six months and in January 2017, Bojan admitted he would be ready to leave Stoke in order to gain regular football.

==== 2017–18: Loans to Mainz and Alavés ====
On 29 January 2017, Bojan joined Bundesliga team Mainz 05 on loan for the remainder of the 2016–17 season. Mainz were struggling in a relegation battle at the bottom of the table and Bojan admitted he was surprised at their situation. He scored his first goal for Mainz in a 2–2 draw against Bayern Munich, making him only the seventh player to score in the four top leagues in Europe. Bojan helped Mainz secure their Bundesliga status with a 4–2 win against Eintracht Frankfurt on 13 May 2017.

On 31 August 2017, Bojan joined La Liga team Alavés on a season-long loan deal. Bojan played 15 times for Alavés in the 2017–18 season, as the team finished in 14th position.

==== Return to Stoke ====
Bojan remained with Stoke in the second tier for the 2018–19 season. Despite being a fan favorite, he struggled to impress manager Gary Rowett. The situation came to a head in late December when Bojan was left out of the squad against Bolton Wanderers and supporters began chanting for his inclusion which angered Rowett. Rowett was soon sacked and replaced by Nathan Jones, but Bojan again struggled to establish himself as a regular starter. He played 23 times in 2018–19 as Stoke finished in 16th position and it was reported that he was told to look for another club. He left Stoke by mutual consent on 6 August 2019.

=== Montreal Impact ===
On 7 August 2019, Bojan joined Major League Soccer team Montreal Impact with a deal through to the end of the 2020 season. He made his debut four days later in a 2–3 loss against Chicago Fire, replacing Shamit Shome in the 63rd minute. On 25 August, he scored his first goal with a 25-yard strike to open a 1–2 loss away to Toronto FC in the Canadian Classique; it was his first goal in 11 months.

In December 2020, with the Impact declining to activate the option to keep him for the next year, Bojan was left out of their CONCACAF Champions League squad.

=== Vissel Kobe ===
In August 2021, Bojan joined J1 League club Vissel Kobe. He made his debut on 5 September, coming on in the 75th minute for former Barcelona teammate Andrés Iniesta in a 1–1 draw at Sanfrecce Hiroshima. On 2 October, after coming on for the same player, he scored his first goal to conclude a 5–1 home victory over Urawa Red Diamonds. Krkić found himself without a club as of January 2023 after being left out of the squad by Vissel Kobe.

=== Retirement ===
Bojan officially retired at the age of 32, with the announcement made at the Camp Nou in Barcelona on 23 March 2023.

== International career ==
=== Spain ===
==== Youth ====
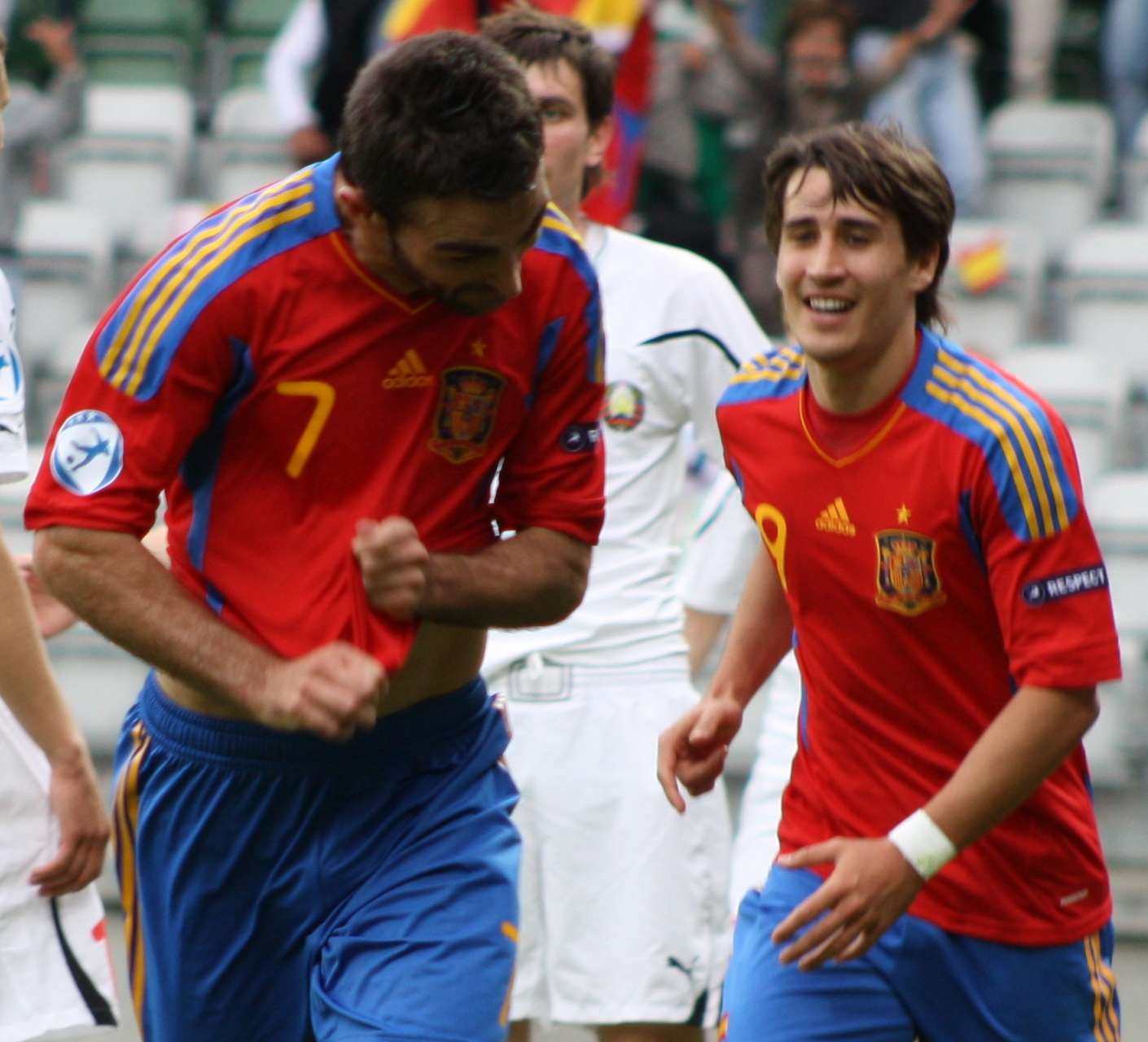
Bojan (no. 9) with teammate Adrián (no. 7) with Spain U21 after Adrián scores in their European Under-21 Championship semi-final match against Belarus

Bojan shot to prominence as a 15-year-old at the UEFA European Under-17 Championship in Luxembourg in May 2006 when he was joint top-scorer, despite being a year younger than most of the other players in the tournament and only playing 40 minutes in four out of Spain's five matches. He scored a hat-trick against Luxembourg before inspiring his team to a 3–0 victory over the eventual champions Russia, with all of the goals being scored after he came on as a second-half substitute. In the third match, he scored a penalty after once again being introduced at half time. He started the semi-final against the Czech Republic but, after his teammate Roberto García was sent off, Spain struggled and lost 0–2 in a shock result. In the third-place play-off, Bojan was once again a second-half substitute and scored the opener in the 53rd minute. When the match went to penalties, he scored and Spain won 5–4 to finish third. In the 2007 European Under-17 Football Championship, Bojan led Spain to victory, scoring the only goal against England in the final. He also scored in the semi-final against Belgium.

There was controversy surrounding Bojan's call up to the Spain U17 squad for the 2007 FIFA U-17 World Cup in South Korea, because Barcelona wanted to keep him so that he could be part of their Asian tour. The Royal Spanish Football Federation (RFEF) denied the request, and further controversy arose when the RFEF denied one of Barcelona's medics, Ricard Pruna, the opportunity to accompany Bojan to the tournament to monitor a tendon problem in the player's knee.

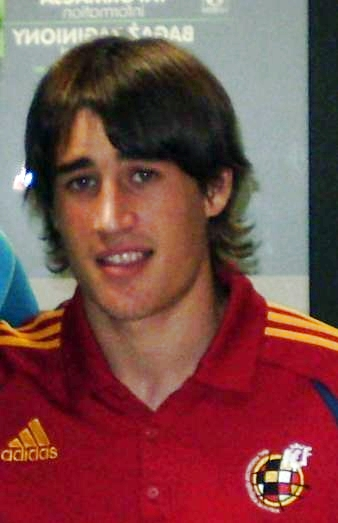
Bojan at Bydgoszcz Ignacy Jan Paderewski Airport, a few days before the U21 match between Spain and Poland.

During the tournament, Bojan scored five goals, finishing as joint third top scorer along with Germany midfielder Toni Kroos. He was inspirational in leading Spain to the final. In the semi-final against Ghana, however, Bojan was sent off for his second yellow card with only seconds left to play. He was suspended for the final and Spain lost to Nigeria on penalties. Because of his performances, Bojan was given the Adidas Bronze Ball, naming him the third best player in the tournament, behind Nigeria's Macauley Chrisantus (silver) and Toni Kroos (gold).

Bojan scored for the Spanish under-21s in their 2–0 win over Poland, on 12 October 2007, quickly establishing himself as an important player, also prompting rumours of an eventual call-up from senior team's manager Luis Aragonés. Bojan was selected in the squad for the 2009 UEFA Under-21 Championship. The Spanish team, however, underperformed and picked up one point from their first two games, leaving progression almost impossible. Bojan was called up to the Spain U-21 squad for 2011 UEFA European Under-21 Football Championship.

==== Senior ====
Bojan was approached to play for Serbia in 2008 but declined because of his wish to play for Spain. He was included in the Spanish squad for a friendly game against France on 6 February 2008. Should he have featured in that match, Bojan would have made history by becoming the youngest player ever to represent Spain at 17 years, 5 months and 9 days, eclipsing Ángel Zubieta's record of 17 years and 9 months, which had stood for over 70 years. Bojan, however, fell ill and could not play.

On 17 May 2008, it was revealed that Bojan had been left out of Spain's 23-man squad for UEFA Euro 2008 having asked if he could be left out on personal grounds, and also citing fatigue. In an interview with The Guardian ten years later, he revealed that he missed both his international debut and UEFA Euro 2008 because of anxiety issues, covering it up by giving other reasons he could not play. Bojan claims that his mental health issues were well known by members of the Spanish Football Federation, such as first team coach Luis Aragonés, sporting director Fernando Hierro and teammate Carles Puyol.

He made his full Spanish debut on 10 September 2008 (at 18 years and 13 days) under Vicente del Bosque against Armenia, where he came on during the last ten minutes for Santi Cazorla and played on the right wing for his only senior cap.

=== Catalonia ===
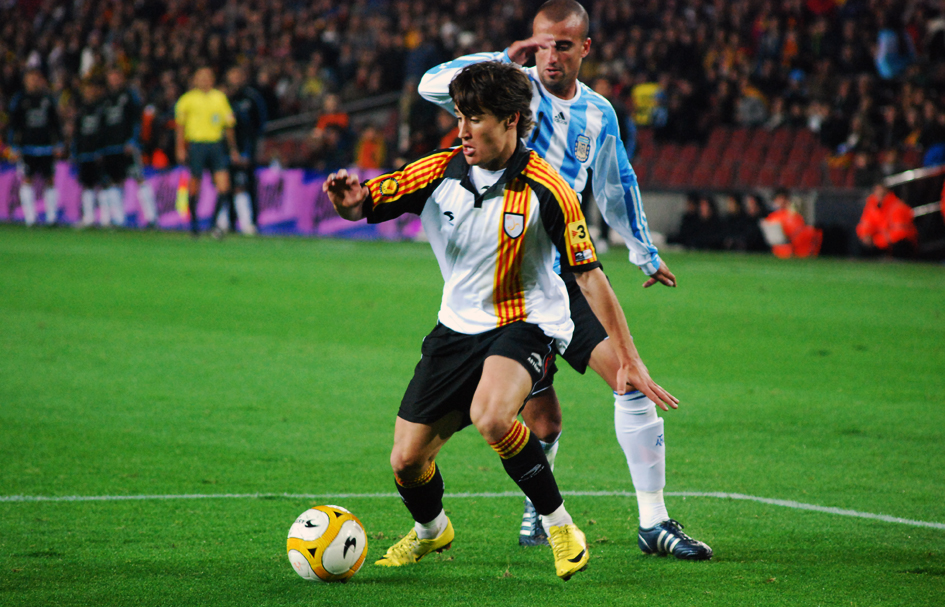
Bojan with Catalonia in its friendly against Argentina on 22 December 2009.

Bojan made his official debut with Catalonia in the friendly match against the Basque Country, on 29 December 2007 in Bilbao and he scored the Catalan goal in the 1–1 draw. He also scored a year later on 29 December 2008 in the 2–1 win over Colombia and in the 4–2 win against Argentina, on 22 December 2009. He scored twice and also provided two assists in a 4–0 win against Honduras, on 29 December 2010.

On 25 March 2019, Bojan scored the opening goal in a 2–1 friendly match victory over Venezuela at Girona's Montilivi Stadium.

== Post-retirement ==
On 13 September 2023, he became the football coordinator at his former club Barcelona, with his main task being monitoring the youngsters at La Masia, along with head of youth department, Alexanko.

== Personal life ==
His father, Bojan Krkić Sr, was a professional footballer in Yugoslavia and a scout for Barcelona. Bojan was eligible to play football for Serbia through his father.

According to a genealogical research conducted by Diari Segre in 2011, Bojan is a fourth cousin of former teammate Lionel Messi; both are the great-great-great-grandchildren of Mariano Pérez Miralles and Teresa Llobrera Minguet, who married in El Poal in the Catalan Comarca of Pla d'Urgell in 1846. The finding had a very significant coverage in Spanish media: it was reported by all four major sports newspapers and by some of the largest general-interest newspapers, including ABC and La Vanguardia.

In 2021, Bojan obtained his academic degree as a master in Sport Management from Johan Cruyff Institute.

== Career statistics ==
=== Club ===
Appearances and goals by club, season and competition
Club	Season	League			National cup (Note: Includes Copa del Rey, Coppa Italia, KNVB Cup, FA Cup, Canadian Championship, Emperor's Cup)		League cup (Note: Includes Football League Cup, J.League Cup)		Continental		Other		Total	
Club	Season	Division	Apps	Goals	Apps	Goals	Apps	Goals	Apps	Goals	Apps	Goals	Apps	Goals
Barcelona B	2006–07	Segunda División B	22	10	—		—		—		—		22	10
Barcelona	2007–08	La Liga	31	10	8	1	—		9 (Note: Appearances in UEFA Champions League)	1	—		48	12
Barcelona	2008–09	La Liga	23	2	9	5	—		10	3	—		42	10
Barcelona	2009–10	La Liga	23	8	4	2	—		5	1	4 (Note: Two appearances and one goal in Supercopa de España, one appearance in UEFA Super Cup, one appearance in FIFA Club World Cup)	1	36	12
Barcelona	2010–11	La Liga	27	6	5	1	—		3	0	2 (Note: Appearances in Supercopa de España)	0	37	7
Barcelona	Total		104	26	26	9	—		27	5	6	1	163	41
Roma	2011–12	Serie A	33	7	2	0	—		2 (Note: Appearances in UEFA Europa League)	0	—		37	7
Milan (loan)	2012–13	Serie A	19	3	2	0	—		6	0	—		27	3
Barcelona	2013–14	La Liga	0	0	0	0	—		0	0	0	0	0	0
Ajax (loan)	2013–14	Eredivisie	24	4	3	1	—		4 (Note: Two appearances in UEFA Champions League, two appearances in UEFA Europa League)	0	1 (Note: Appearance in Johan Cruyff Shield)	0	32	5
Stoke City	2014–15	Premier League	16	4	1	1	1	0	—		—		18	5
Stoke City	2015–16	Premier League	27	7	1	0	3	0	—		—		31	7
Stoke City	2016–17	Premier League	9	3	1	0	1	0	—		—		11	3
Stoke City	2017–18	Premier League	1	0	0	0	1	0	—		—		2	0
Stoke City	2018–19	Championship	21	1	0	0	2	0	—		—		23	1
Stoke City	Total		74	15	3	1	8	0	—		—		85	16
Stoke City U23	2016–17	—	—		—		—		—		1 (Note: Appearance in EFL Trophy)	1	1	1
Mainz 05 (loan)	2016–17	Bundesliga	11	1	0	0	—		—		—		11	1
Alavés (loan)	2017–18	La Liga	13	0	2	1	—		—		—		15	1
Montreal Impact	2019	MLS	8	3	2	0	—		—		—		10	3
Montreal Impact	2020	MLS	17	4	0	0	—		2 (Note: Appearances in CONCACAF Champions League)	0	—		19	4
Montreal Impact	Total		25	7	2	0	—		2	0	—		29	7
Vissel Kobe	2021	J1 League	6	1	0	0	0	0	0	0	—		6	1
Vissel Kobe	2022	J1 League	14	0	3	0	0	0	3	0	—		20	0
Vissel Kobe	Total		20	1	3	0	0	0	3	0	—		26	1
Career total			345	74	43	12	8	0	44	5	8	2	433	93

=== International ===
Appearances and goals by national team and year
National team	Year	Apps	Goals
Spain	2008	1	0
Total		1	0

== Honours ==
Barcelona

- La Liga: 2008–09, 2009–10, 2010–11
- Copa del Rey: 2008–09
- Supercopa de España: 2009, 2010
- UEFA Champions League: 2008–09, 2010–11
- UEFA Super Cup: 2009
- FIFA Club World Cup: 2009

Ajax

- Eredivisie: 2013–14
- Johan Cruyff Shield: 2013

Montreal Impact

- Canadian Championship: 2019

Spain U17

- UEFA U-17 European Championship: 2007

Spain U21

- UEFA U-21 European Championship: 2011

Individual

- UEFA U-17 Championship Golden Player: 2007
- UEFA U-17 Championship Top Scorer: 2006
- FIFA U-17 World Cup Bronze Ball: 2007
- FIFA U-17 World Cup Bronze Shoe: 2007
- La Liga Breakthrough Player of the Year: 2007–08
- Barça Players' Award: 2009–10
