= Ponent =

Region in Catalonia

Coordinates: 41°41′47″N 0°54′51″E

Ponent within Catalonia

Ponent, also known as the Lleida region following the vegueries law, is the westernmost of the eight regions (vegueries) defined by the Regional Plan of Catalonia. It has an area of 5,586 km^{2}, and 365,289 inhabitants as of 2022.

The region includes the comarques of Segrià, Garrigues, Noguera, Pla d'Urgell, Segarra and Urgell. Within Catalonia, it borders to the north with Alt Pirineu, to the east with Central Catalonia, Penedès and Camp de Tarragona, and to the south with Terres de l'Ebre. Outside of administrative terms, the name is sometimes used including the Aragonese comarques of Baix Cinca and La Llitera, which are part of the Catalan-speaking territory in Aragon known as Franja de Ponent.

Its capital is the city of Lleida.

== Name ==
The region's name, inherited from Latin ponentem (putting, setting), refers to the west (of Catalonia). Other traditional names include Terres de Ponent (Lands of Ponent) and Terra Ferma. Some political sectors have spoken out in favour of and against the name of the vegueria including the capital's name, those in favour proposing names such as Terres de Lleida, Comarques de Lleida, or Terres Lleidatanes, with the final name being simply the Lleida region.

The region's demonym is ponentí (Catalan: [pu.nənˈti]) (pl. ponentins).

== Demography ==
Comarques and municipalities in the Ponent region

The economy is focused on agriculture, although major populations have a large concentration of services and food processing industries. The most important city is Lleida, followed by Balaguer, Tàrrega and Mollerussa. Other important towns are Cervera, Les Borges Blanques, Agramunt, Artesa de Segre, Ponts and, while administratively part of Aragon, the city of Fraga.

Comarques	Population (2022)
Segrià	209,149
Garrigues	19,012
Noguera	38,802
Pla d'Urgell	37,751
Segarra	23,209
Urgell	37,366
