= El Poal =

- Municipality
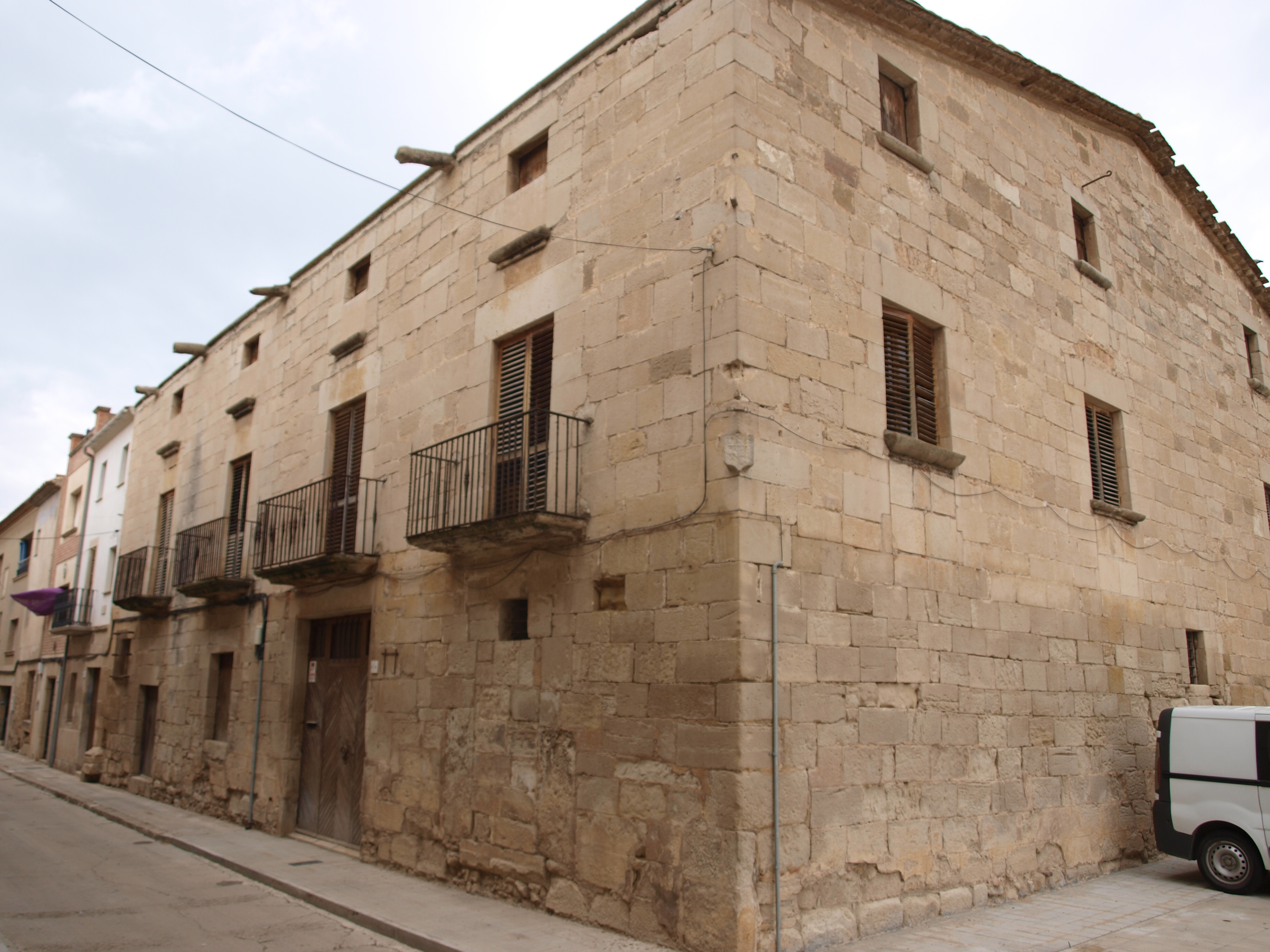
- Cal Castell, in El Poal

- Coat of arms

- Coordinates: 41°40′51″N 0°51′26″E
- Country: Spain
- Autonomous Community: Catalonia
- Province: Lleida
- Comarca: Pla d'Urgell

Government
  - Mayor: Rafel Panadés Farré (2015) (CiU)

Area
  - Total: 8.9 km^{2} (3.4 sq mi)
- Elevation: 215 m (705 ft)

Population (2025-01-01)
  - Total: 649
  - Density: 73/km^{2} (190/sq mi)
- Postal code: 25143
- Website: poal.ddl.net

El Poal (Catalan pronunciation: [el poˈal]) is a village of Pla d'Urgell, Catalonia, Spain.

== Geography ==
El Poal is approximately located five miles south from Mollerussa, capital of the region, specifically along the shore of the Urgell Canal. El Poal borders on Linyola to the north, Palau d’Anglesola to the south, Vila-sana to the east and Bellvís to the west.

- Altitude: 215 metres
- Surface: 9 square km
- Population: 660 inhabitants

Throughout this fertile plain irrigated crops such as fodder, maize, cereals and fruit trees are cultivated. The economy of the village is complemented by stockbreeding. Minor occupation is focused on industry and services.

== Demographic evolution ==
Historical population
Year	1930	1950	1970	1981	1986
Pop.	659	768	815	728	689
±%	—	+16.5%	+6.1%	−10.7%	−5.4%

== Special events, fairs and celebrations ==
- Annual Town Celebration and Sona El Poal Festival (electronic nights with video projections along the town): 24 August
- Carnival 2006: 24th and 25 February (big fire organized by the youth, popular dinner and traditional dances)
- Annual Celebration of El Roser: 2nd weekend of May
- Annual Celebration of Joan Baptista: 3rd weekend of August
- National Day of Catalonia: 11 September (popular sardine dinner with habaneras party in the swimming-pool)
