= Amina Hussein =

Kurdish journalist (b.1988)

- Born: 1988 (age 37–38); Qamishlo, Syria
- Occupation: Journalist

Amina Hussein (b. 1988) is a Syrian Kurdish journalist based in Catalonia.

== Biography ==
Amina Hussein was born in the city of Qamishlo, in Syria. As a stateless person, she was unable to go to university in her home country. In 2006, she settled in Barcelona as a political refugee. In 2017, she graduated from Pompeu Fabra University with a degree in journalism.

She speaks Kurdish, Arabic, Catalan, Spanish and English. She has worked for several Catalan media outlets and for Kurdistan Radiotelevision, for which she interviewed Catalan President Carles Puigdemont on the eve of 2017 Catalan independence referendum. She is an advocate for the sovereignty of the Kurdish people, and has criticised European policies on the refugee crisis in Europe.

In 2021, she received an award from the Mollerusa City Council for her work in publicising the Rojava conflict.
