= Joan Solà i Cortassa =

Spanish linguist & philologist

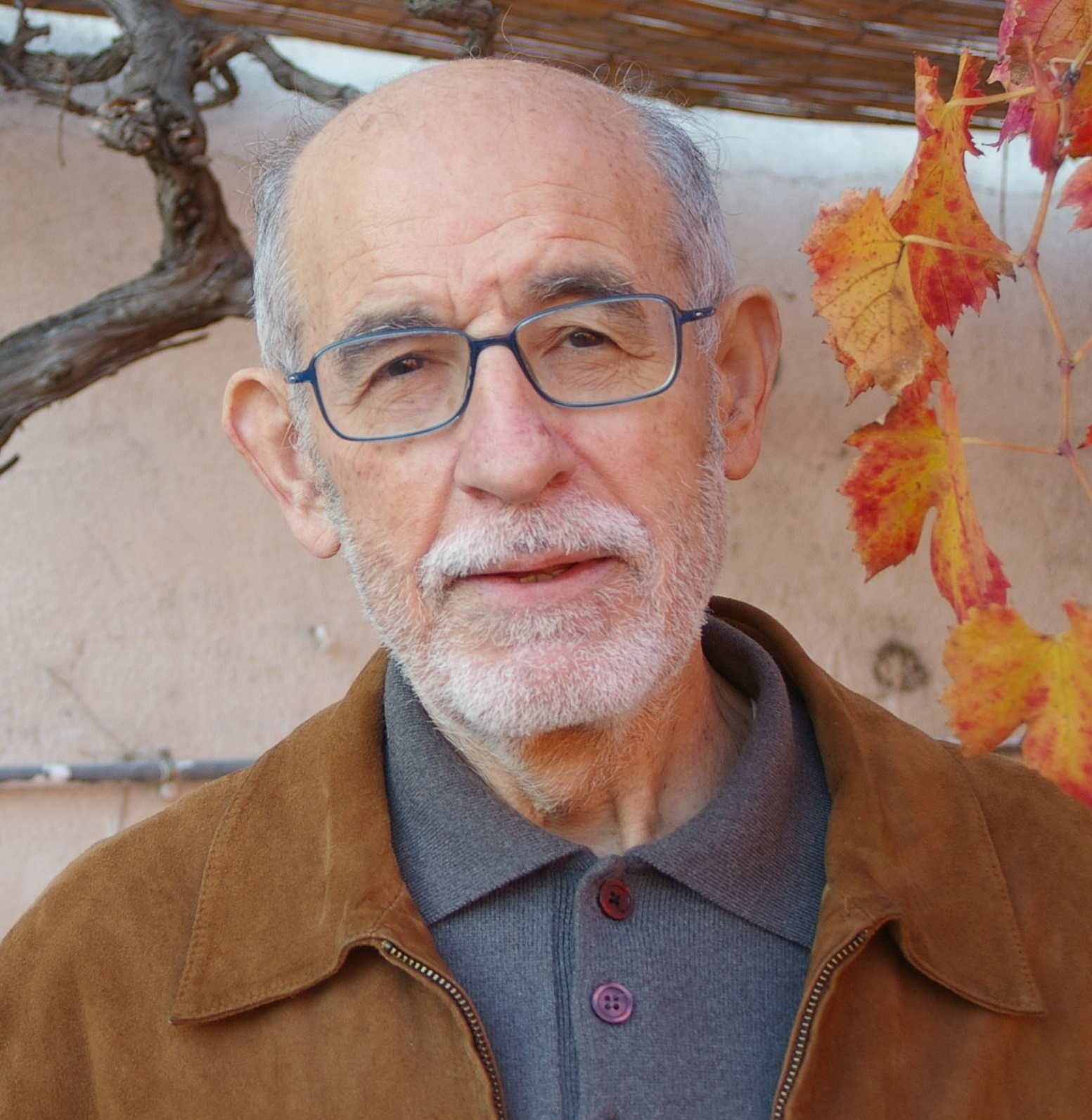
- Born: 10 January 1940; Bell-lloc d'Urgell, Spain
- Died: 27 October 2010 (aged 70); Barcelona, Spain

Joan Solà Cortassa (Bell-lloc d'Urgell, 10 January 1940 — Barcelona, 27 October 2010) was a Spanish linguist and philologist. He was professor of Catalan language and literature at the University of Barcelona from 1984 onwards, and vice president of the Institut d'Estudis Catalans (IEC) from 2009.

== Biography ==
He graduated in Classical Philology in 1965 at University of Barcelona and he got his PhD in Catalan Philology in 1970 at that same university. In 1977 he graduated with a master's degree in Linguistics at the University of Reading in England.

He was a professor at various institutions of higher learning (such as the Universitat Autònoma de Barcelona) starting in 1965, and from 1984 onwards he was chair of Catalan language and literature at the Universitat de Barcelona. He was also a member of the Internacional Association of Catalan Language and Literature. He co-directed, with Jordi Mir, the creation of the Obres completes de Pompeu Fabra, as well as directing the project for the Gramàtica del català contemporani, and at the time of his death was contributing to the new normative grammar for the Institut d’Estudis Catalans, where he had been a member since 1999. He published a number of studies and almost a thousand newspaper articles, most of which were about subjects related to syntax or the history of the Catalan language.

He died on 27 October 2010 in Barcelona at 70 years of age, and lay in repose at the historic Paranimf auditorium of the University of Barcelona the day after. In May 2011 his posthumous book L’última lliçó (The last lesson) was published, consisting of his public interventions during 2009, the year in which he received all of his major honors.

His family donated Solà's private library to the CRAI Biblioteca de Lletres Universitat de Barcelona UB and his personal archive to the Biblioteca de Catalunya.

== Linguistic ideology ==
As a linguist he argued that we must separate what is internal to a language from what is external (what is established by the grammar is different from the actual use of that structure or sentence). He also was in favor of integrating the great dialects into the normative grammar. In particular, he defended that the Catalan normative grammar must be compositional (i.e. all dialects must be included so as that speakers identify with the standard language). He was in favor of relying on the native speakers’ intuition and therefore defended that people shouldn't be afraid of using a particular dialect across the Catalan territories. Solà also stated that a normative grammar must be, first, a descriptive grammar, taking into account all the information that has been gathered of a language.

== Awards ==
Among the awards which he was given were the Premi a la Investigació Lingüística (Award for Linguistic Investigation) from the Fundació Enciclopèdia Catalan (1991), and the Premi de Recerca Crítica Serra d’Or (the Serra d’Or Award for Critical Research for his work Història de la lingüística catalana, 1775-1900: repertori crític (“History of Catalan Linguistics, 1775-1900: A Critical Repertory”, 1999, written together with Pere Marcet), the Sanchis Guarner Award from the Fundació Jaume I for the Gramàtica del català contemporani (“Grammar of Contemporary Catalan”, 2002, a project he led along with Maria-Rosa Lloret, Joan Mascaró, and Manuel Pérez-Saldanya), or the Narcís Monturiol Medal for scientific and technological merit for his research into the Catalan language, both synchronic and diachronic, as well as for his work in the dissemination of that knowledge for the general public.

In 2005 he received the Creu de Sant Jordi. In 2009 he was granted an honorary doctorate by the University of Lleida, and received the Premi d’Honor de les Lletres Catalanes, an award conferred by the association Òmnium Cultural in recognition of civic trajectory and prestige of published works. In 2010 he was honored for his lifelong dedication to the defense of the Catalan language and culture at the Premis Joan Coromines, given by the Coordinadora d’Associacions per la Llengua catalana.

In 2010 the book Joan Solà. 10 textos d’homenatge (“Joan Solà: 10 Texts in Homage”) was published, edited by of the department of Catalan Philology at the Universitat de Barcelona, in which many of his collaborators contributed pieces on his life and works.

== Main works ==
- Tots els llibres de la biblioteca Joan Solà a Universitat de Barcelona. (-∞ a.J - +∞ d.J)
- Estudis de sintaxi catalana (1972-1973)
- A l'entorn de la llengua (1977)
- Del català incorrecte al català correcte (1977)
- "Ser" i "estar" en el català d'avui (1981)
- Sintaxi generativa catalana (1986), with Sebastià Bonet
- Qüestions controvertides de sintaxi catalana (1987)
- L'obra de Pompeu Fabra (1987)
- Bibliografia lingüística catalana del segle XIX (1989), amb Pere Marcet
- Lingüística i normativa (1990)
- La llengua, una convenció dialèctica (1993)
- Sintaxi normativa: estat de la qüestió (1994)
- Història de la lingüística catalana, 1775-1900 (1998), with Pere Marcet
- Parlem-ne (1999)
- Gramàtica del català contemporani (2002), edited with Maria-Rosa Lloret, Joan Mascaró and Manuel Pérez-Saldanya
- Ensenyar la llengua (2003)
- Pompeu Fabra: vida i obra (2007), with Jordi Ginebra
- Plantem cara. Defensa de la llengua, defensa de la terra (2009)
- L'última lliçó (2011)

== Literature about Solà ==
- "Qui és Joan Solà?", in Festes de setembre 1988. Bell-lloc d'Urgell, 1988, p. 2.
- BRANCHADELL, Albert: "La gramática de Solà", La Vanguardia, June 26, 2002, p. 5-6.
- PLA NUALART, Albert: "Doctor 'Laboris Causa'", Avui, May 10, 2009, p. 49.
- RIERA, Carles: "Joan Solà, lingüista", Serra d'Or, núm. 517, 2003, p. 23-24.
- SÀNCHEZ, Àngel: "Joan Solà", El Periódico, July 8, 2002.
- NOGUÉ, Neus ... [et al.] ed. Joan Solà: 10 textos d'homenatge. Barcelona: Empúries, 2010.
- OLIVA, Salvador (ed.). Joan Solà, in memoriam. Girona: University of Girona, 2012.
- ADALIL SESPLUGUES, Xavier. "Bibliografia sobre Joan Solà". Bachelor's thesis. UOC, 2014.
- MARÍ I MAYANS, Isidor, "Joan Solà i Cortassa (1940-2010)" in Estudis Romànics34 (2012), p. 751-755.
