= Comarques of Catalonia =

Groups of municipalities in Catalonia, Spain

Comarques of Catalonia

The comarques of Catalonia (singular comarca, Eastern Catalan: [kuˈmarkə], Western Catalan: [koˈmaɾka]), often referred to in English as counties, (Note: Not to be confused with the historical Catalan counties.) are an administrative division of Catalonia, Spain. Each comarca comprises a number of municipalities, roughly equivalent to a county in the United States. Currently, Catalonia is divided into 42 comarques and Aran, considered a "unique territorial entity" and not a comarca.

Each comarca has a representative county council (Catalan: consell comarcal), except for Barcelonès which abolished it in 2019, and Aran which has instead the Conselh Generau d'Aran.

Comarques form the second-level administrative division within Catalonia, being a subdivision of vegueries (or provinces at state level).

== Overview ==
Although today the comarques are officially defined under a Catalan parliamentary act, for centuries they had existed unofficially, with citizens identifying with a particular comarca in the same way that people in other parts of the world might identify with a particular region.

In some cases, comarques consist of rural areas and many small villages centring on an important town, where the people of the region traditionally go to shop or to sell their goods. This is the case of comarques such as the Pla de l'Estany, centred on the town of Banyoles, or the Ripollès, centred on the town of Ripoll. In other cases, comarques are larger areas with many important population centres that have traditionally been considered part of the same region, as in the case of the Empordà or Vallès.

The current official division of Catalonia into comarques originates in an order of the autonomous Catalan government under the Spanish Republic in 1936. It was superseded after the 1939 victory of Francisco Franco's forces in the Spanish Civil War, but restored in 1987 by the re-established Generalitat of Catalonia. Since the definition of comarques is sometimes ambiguous, many new proposals have been made since the comarques were first officially designated as attempts to modify the official distribution with what some regions consider to be a traditional comarca. As a result, some revisions to the official division have been made, such as the additions of Moianès and Lluçanès to the map, in 2015 and 2023 respectively.

Comarques exist as a local government area, and have a representative county council. They are often known as counties in the English language, but this can be confused with the counties that were ruled by counts.

Borders of comarques generally do not cross those of the four state-level provinces (Barcelona, Girona, Lleida, Tarragona). However, since the provinces are defined by the Spanish government, while comarques are defined by the Catalan government, exceptions do exist – most notably in the case of Cerdanya, which is roughly evenly split between the provinces of Lleida and Girona (other exceptions generally involve only a handful of municipalities).

Aran, which is included here, is officially not a comarca but a "unique territorial entity" with additional powers. Its current status was formalised in February 2015.

== List of comarques ==
| Comarca | Date created | Capital | Number of municipalities | Population (2014) | Area (km^{2}) | Density | Region (vegueria) | Province(s) |
|---|---|---|---|---|---|---|---|---|
| Alt Camp | 1987 | Valls | 23 | 44,578 | 538.2 | 82.8 | Camp de Tarragona | Tarragona |
| Alt Empordà | 1987 | Figueres | 68 | 140,214 | 1,357.4 | 103.3 | Comarques Gironines | Girona |
| Alt Penedès | 1987 | Vilafranca del Penedès | 27 | 106,262 | 592.7 | 179.3 | Penedès | Barcelona |
| Alt Urgell | 1987 | La Seu d'Urgell | 19 | 20,878 | 1,447.5 | 14.4 | Alt Pirineu | Lleida |
| Alta Ribagorça | 1988 | El Pont de Suert | 3 | 3,873 | 426.8 | 9.1 | Alt Pirineu | Lleida |
| Anoia | 1987 | Igualada | 33 | 117,842 | 866.3 | 136.0 | Penedès, Central Catalonia | Barcelona |
| Aran | 1987 | Vielha e Mijaran | 9 | 9,993 | 633.5 | 15.8 | Aran | Lleida |
| Bages | 1987 | Manresa | 30 | 175,527 (Note: Adjusted following creation of Moianès) | 1,092.2 | 160.7 | Central Catalonia | Barcelona |
| Baix Camp | 1987 | Reus | 28 | 190,249 | 697.3 | 272.8 | Camp de Tarragona | Tarragona |
| Baix Ebre | 1987 | Tortosa | 14 | 80,637 | 1002.6 | 80.4 | Terres de l'Ebre | Tarragona |
| Baix Empordà | 1987 | La Bisbal d'Empordà | 36 | 132,886 | 701.8 | 189.4 | Comarques Gironines | Girona |
| Baix Llobregat | 1987 | Sant Feliu de Llobregat | 30 | 806,249 | 486.2 | 1,658.3 | Barcelona | Barcelona |
| Baix Penedès | 1987 | El Vendrell | 14 | 100,262 | 296.4 | 338.3 | Penedès | Tarragona |
| Barcelonès | 1987 | Barcelona | 5 | 2,227,238 | 145.8 | 15,276.0 | Barcelona | Barcelona |
| Berguedà | 1987 | Berga | 31 | 40,039 | 1,185.3 | 33.8 | Central Catalonia | Barcelona, Lleida |
| Cerdanya | 1987 | Puigcerdà | 17 | 18,063 | 546.6 | 33.0 | Alt Pirineu | Girona, Lleida |
| Conca de Barberà | 1987 | Montblanc | 22 | 20,723 | 650.2 | 31.9 | Camp de Tarragona | Tarragona |
| Garraf | 1987 | Vilanova i la Geltrú | 6 | 145,886 | 185.1 | 788.1 | Penedès | Barcelona |
| Garrigues | 1987 | Les Borges Blanques | 24 | 19,762 | 797.7 | 24.8 | Ponent | Lleida |
| Garrotxa | 1987 | Olot | 21 | 56,036 | 734.5 | 76.3 | Comarques Gironines | Girona |
| Gironès | 1987 | Girona | 28 | 185,085 | 575.6 | 321.6 | Comarques Gironines | Girona |
| Lluçanès | 2023 | Prats de Lluçanès | n/a | n/a | n/a | n/a | Central Catalonia | Barcelona |
| Maresme | 1987 | Mataró | 30 | 437,919 | 398.6 | 1,098.6 | Barcelona | Barcelona |
| Moianès | 2015 | Moià | 10 | 13,056 | 337.9 | 38.6 | Central Catalonia | Barcelona |
| Montsià | 1987 | Amposta | 12 | 69,613 | 735.5 | 94.6 | Terres de l'Ebre | Tarragona |
| Noguera | 1987 | Balaguer | 30 | 39,376 | 1,784.1 | 22.1 | Ponent | Lleida |
| Osona | 1987 | Vic | 50 | 154,559 | 1,245.1 | 124.1 | Central Catalonia | Barcelona, Girona |
| Pallars Jussà | 1987 | Tremp | 14 | 13,530 | 1,343.2 | 10.1 | Alt Pirineu | Lleida |
| Pallars Sobirà | 1987 | Sort | 15 | 7,220 | 1,378.0 | 5.2 | Alt Pirineu | Lleida |
| Pla de l'Estany | 1988 | Banyoles | 11 | 31,554 | 262.8 | 120.1 | Comarques Gironines | Girona |
| Pla d'Urgell | 1988 | Mollerussa | 16 | 37,128 | 305.2 | 121.7 | Ponent | Lleida |
| Priorat | 1987 | Falset | 23 | 9,550 | 498.7 | 19.1 | Camp de Tarragona | Tarragona |
| Ribera d'Ebre | 1987 | Móra d'Ebre | 14 | 22,925 | 827.1 | 27.7 | Terres de l'Ebre | Tarragona |
| Ripollès | 1987 | Ripoll | 19 | 25,700 | 956.6 | 26.9 | Comarques Gironines | Girona |
| Segarra | 1987 | Cervera | 21 | 22,713 | 722.8 | 31.4 | Ponent | Lleida |
| Segrià | 1987 | Lleida | 38 | 209,768 | 1,396.4 | 150.2 | Ponent | Lleida |
| Selva | 1987 | Santa Coloma de Farners | 26 | 170,249 | 994.9 | 171.1 | Comarques Gironines | Girona, Barcelona |
| Solsonès | 1987 | Solsona | 15 | 13,497 | 1001.1 | 13.5 | Central Catalonia | Lleida |
| Tarragonès | 1987 | Tarragona | 22 | 250,306 | 319.2 | 784.2 | Camp de Tarragona | Tarragona |
| Terra Alta | 1987 | Gandesa | 12 | 12,119 | 743.0 | 16.3 | Terres de l'Ebre | Tarragona |
| Urgell | 1987 | Tàrrega | 20 | 36,526 | 579.6 | 63.0 | Ponent | Lleida |
| Vallès Occidental | 1987 | Sabadell, Terrassa | 23 | 899,532 | 583.1 | 1,542.7 | Barcelona | Barcelona |
| Vallès Oriental | 1987 | Granollers | 39 | 399,781 | 734.5 | 544.3 | Barcelona | Barcelona |
| Total comarques–43 | | Barcelona | 948 | 7,518,903 | 32,108.0 (Note: The total of the figures above is 32,107.1. The difference may be due to rounding.) | 234.2 | | |

== Comarca revisions ==
Revisions to the comarques took place in 1988 (creation of Pla d'Estany, Pla d'Urgell, and Alta Ribagorça), 1990 (various adjustments), and May 2015 (creation of Moianès). The Catalan government's "Report on the revision of Catalonia's territorial organisation model" (the Roca Report), published in 2000, recommends many more changes to comarques, which have not yet been adopted except for the 2015 creation of Moianès. The other proposed new comarques are: Vall de Camprodon (capital at Camprodon), Selva Marítima (capital at Blanes), Alta Segarra (capital at Calaf), Segre Mitjà (capital at Ponts), and Baix Llobregat Nord (capital at Martorell).

In a non-binding referendum in July 2015, a majority of municipalities of the Lluçanès region of Osona voted to join a proposed new comarca of that name. It was finally added to the list of Comarques on the 3rd of May 2023.

| Date | From comarca | To comarca | Municipalities |
|---|---|---|---|
| 1988 | Gironès | Pla de l'Estany | Banyoles, Camós, Cornellà del Terri, Crespià, Esponellà, Fontcoberta, Palol de Revardit, Porqueres, Sant Miquel de Campmajor, Serinyà, Vilademuls |
| 1988 | Urgell | Pla d'Urgell | Barbens, Castellnou de Seana, Ivars d'Urgell, Vilanova de Bellpuig, Vila-sana |
| 1988 | Segrià | Pla d'Urgell | Bell-lloc d'Urgell, Fondarella, Golmés, Miralcamp, Mollerussa, El Palau d'Anglesola, Sidamon |
| 1988 | Noguera | Pla d'Urgell | Bellvís, Linyola, El Poal |
| 1988 | Garrigues | Pla d'Urgell | Torregrossa |
| 1988 | Pallars Jussà | Alta Ribagorça | Barruera (La Vall de Boí), El Pont de Suert, Vilaller |
| 1990 | Noguera | Segrià | Alfarràs, La Portella |
| 1990 | Priorat | Baix Camp | Arbolí |
| 1990 | Tarragonès | Baix Penedès | Bonastre |
| 1990 | Vallès Occidental | Vallès Oriental | Caldes de Montbui |
| 1990 | Garraf | Alt Penedès | Castellet i la Gornal, Olesa de Bonesvalls |
| 1990 | Barcelonès | Baix Llobregat | Esplugues de Llobregat, Sant Just Desvern |
| 1990 | Tarragonès | Alt Camp | Els Garidells |
| 1990 | Alt Camp | Baix Penedès | Masllorenç |
| 1990 | Anoia | Solsonès | La Molsosa |
| 1990 | Ripollès | Osona | Montesquiu, Santa Maria de Besora, Sant Quirze de Besora, Vidrà |
| 1990 | Urgell | Segarra | Montornès de Segarra |
| 1990 | Baix Ebre | Montsià | Sant Jaume d'Enveja |
| 1990 | Segarra | Conca de Barberà | Vallfogona de Riucorb |
| 1994 | - | Vallès Occidental | Badia del Vallès |
| 2015 | Bages | Moianès | Calders, L'Estany, Moià, Monistrol de Calders, Santa Maria d'Oló |
| 2015 | Vallès Oriental | Moianès | Castellcir, Castellterçol, Granera, Sant Quirze Safaja |
| 2015 | Osona | Moianès | Collsuspina |
| 2015 | - | Gironès | Medinyà |
| 2017 | Gironès | - | Medinyà† |
| 2023 | Segarra | Solsonès | Torà, Biosca |
| 2023 | Osona | Lluçanès | Alpens, Lluçà, Olost, Oristà, Perafita, Prats de Lluçanès, Sant Martí d'Albars, Sobremunt |
| 2023 | Bages | Lluçanès | Sant Feliu Sasserra |
| 2023 | Lluçanès | Bages | Sant Feliu Sasserra |

== Northern Catalan comarques ==
There are six comarques which are often referred to as the historical comarques of Catalonia, because their present-day territory was a part of the former Principality of Catalonia, but nowadays they lie in Northern Catalonia, administered by France.

| Comarca | Capital |
|---|---|
| Alta Cerdanya | Font-romeu |
| Capcir | Els Angles |
| Conflent | Prada de Conflent |
| Rosselló | Perpinyà |
| Vallespir | Ceret |

== See also ==
- Comarcas of Spain
- Local government in Spain
- Municipalities of Catalonia
- Provinces of Spain
- Vegueries of Catalonia
