= Sidamon =

- Municipality
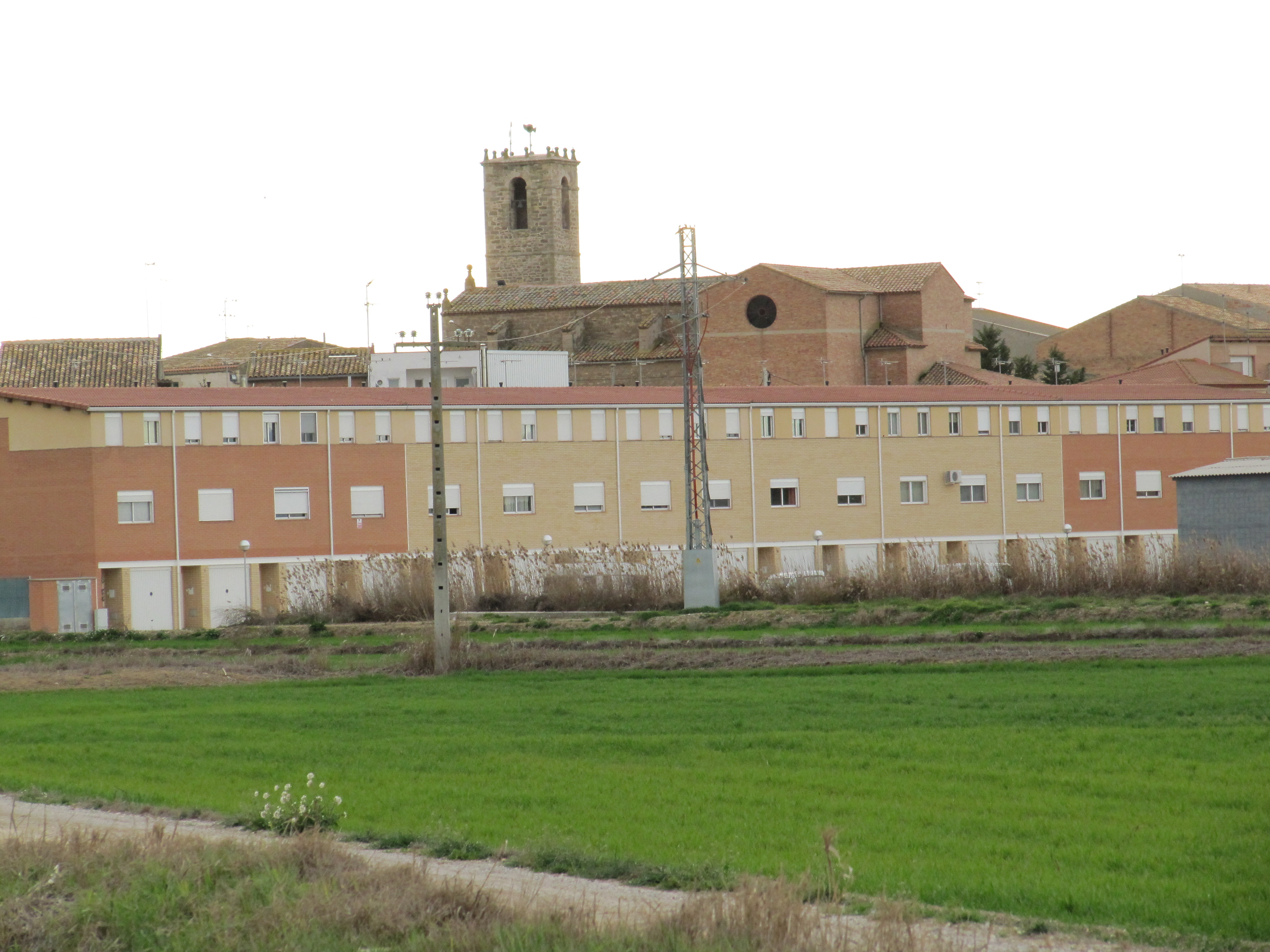
- Sidamon

- Coat of arms

- Location in Catalonia
- Coordinates: 41°37′52″N 0°49′59″E
- Country: Spain
- Community: Catalonia
- Province: Lleida
- Comarca: Pla d'Urgell

Government
  - Mayor: Josep Ma. Huguet Farré (2015)

Area
  - Total: 8.1 km^{2} (3.1 sq mi)

Population (2025-01-01)
  - Total: 760
  - Density: 94/km^{2} (240/sq mi)
- Website: sidamon.cat

Sidamon (Catalan pronunciation: [siðaˈmun]) is a village in the province of Lleida and autonomous community of Catalonia, Spain.
