= Torregrossa =

- Municipality
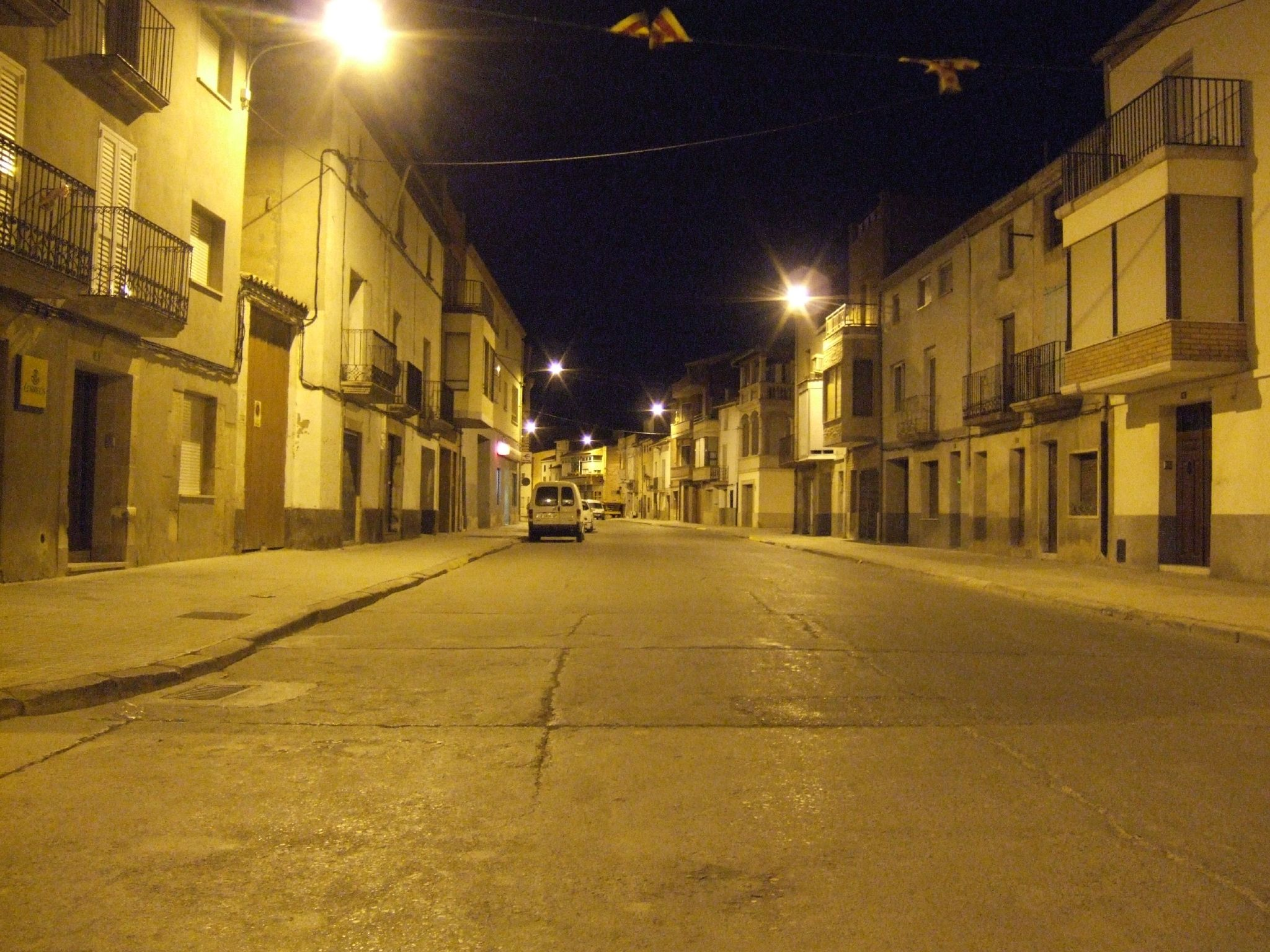

- Coat of arms

- Location in Catalonia
- Coordinates: 41°34′46″N 0°49′44″E
- Country: Spain
- Community: Catalonia
- Province: Lleida
- Comarca: Pla d'Urgell

Government
  - Mayor: Josep Maria Puig Vall (2015)

Area
  - Total: 40.5 km^{2} (15.6 sq mi)

Population (2025-01-01)
  - Total: 2,248
  - Density: 55.5/km^{2} (144/sq mi)
- Website: torregrossa.cat

Torregrossa (Catalan pronunciation: [ˌtoreˈɣɾɔsɛ]) is a village in the province of Lleida and autonomous community of Catalonia, Spain.
