= El Palau d'Anglesola =

- Municipality
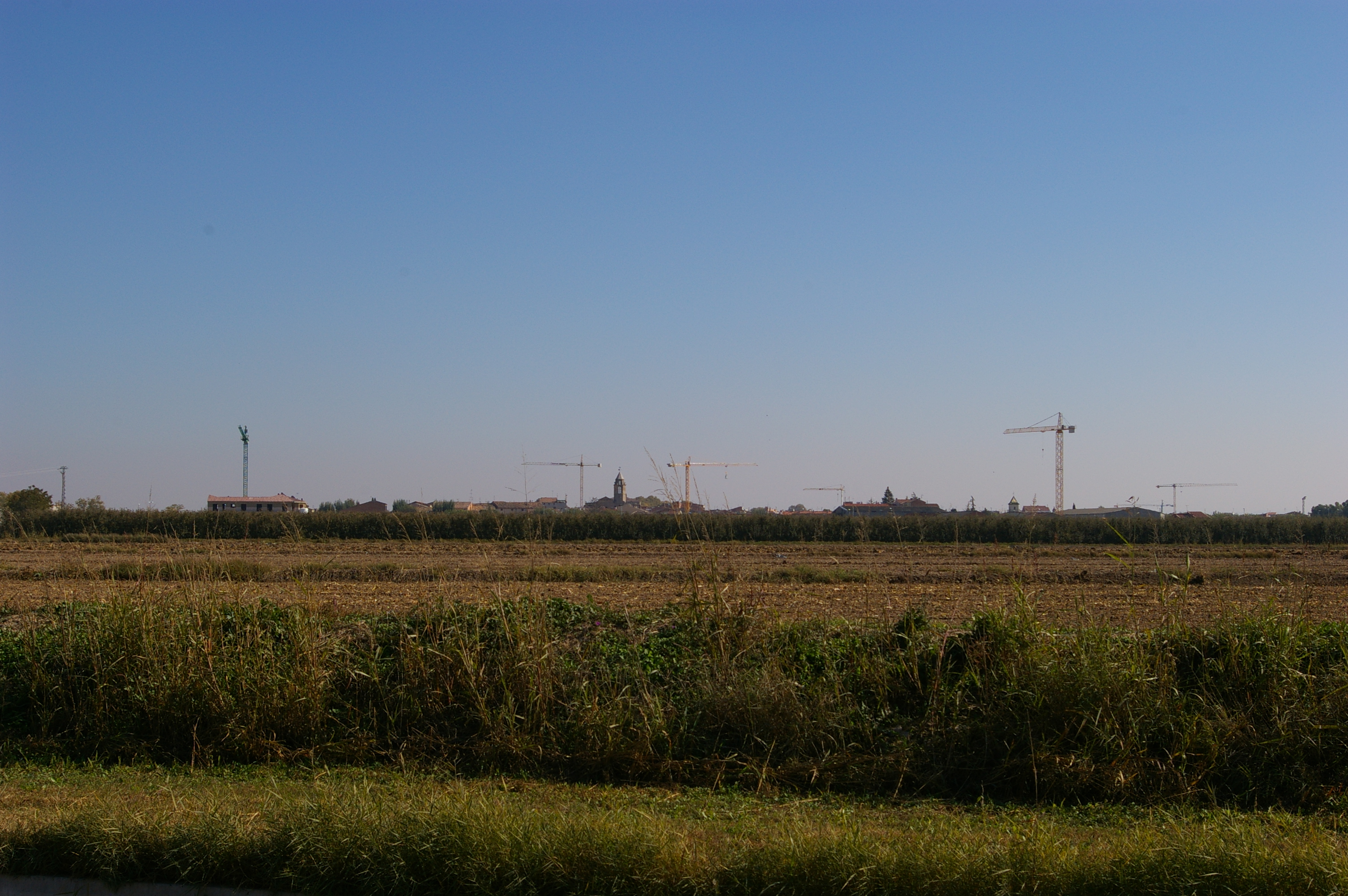

- Seal

- Location in Catalonia
- Coordinates: 41°39′4″N 0°52′46″E
- Country: Spain
- Community: Catalonia
- Province: Lleida
- Comarca: Pla d'Urgell

Government
  - Mayor: Francesc Balcells i Texidó (2019)

Area
  - Total: 12.3 km^{2} (4.7 sq mi)

Population (2025-01-01)
  - Total: 2,232
  - Density: 181/km^{2} (470/sq mi)
- Website: elpalaudanglesola.com

El Palau d'Anglesola (Catalan pronunciation: [el paˈlaw ðaŋgleˈzɔlɛ]) is a village in the province of Lleida and autonomous community of Catalonia, Spain.

== Landmarks ==
Parish Church of Saint John the Baptist, is a building dating back to the 18th century and which is an example of Baroque architecture.
