= Miralcamp =

- Municipality
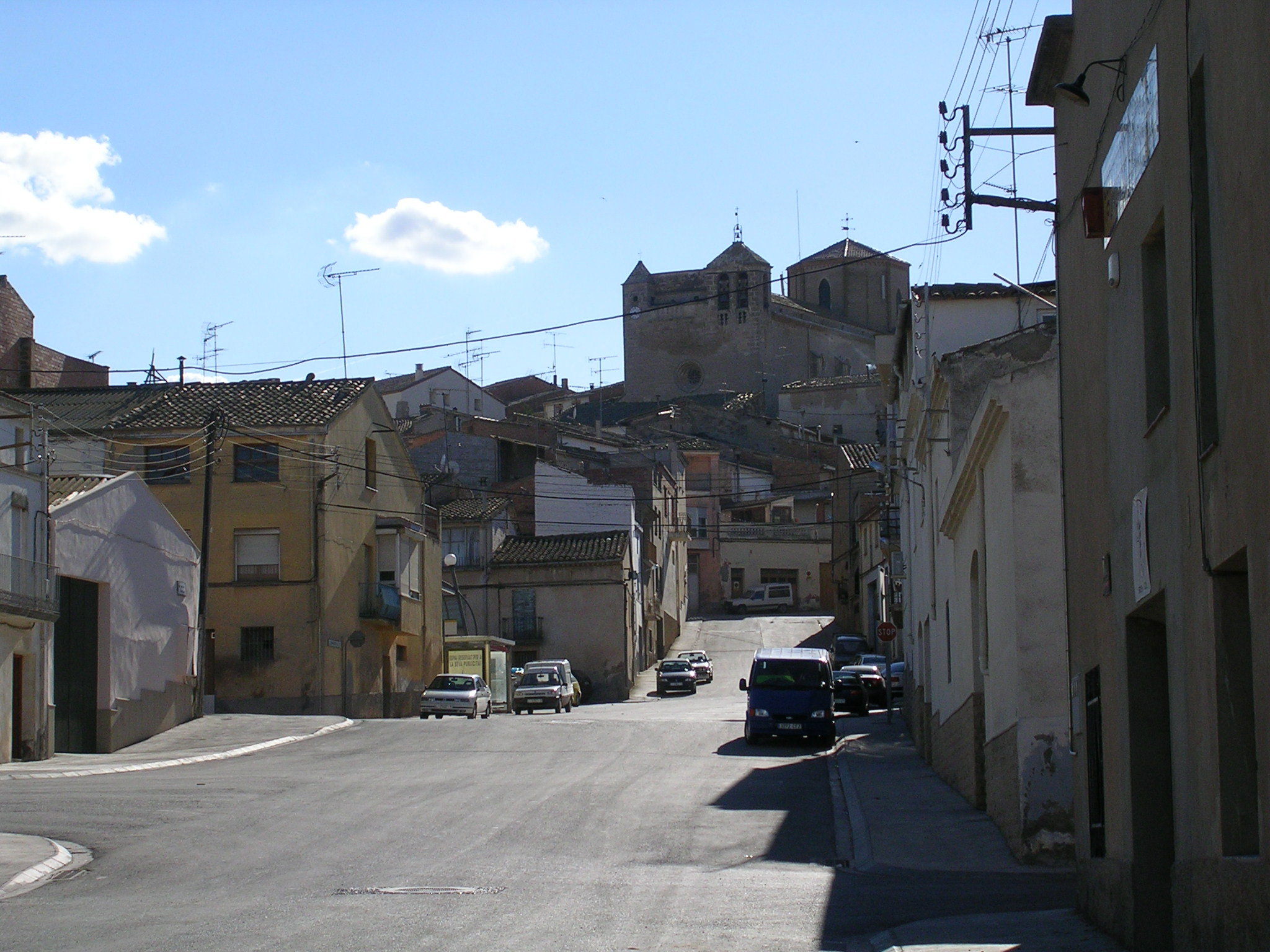
- Center of the village

- Flag Coat of arms

- Location in Catalonia
- Coordinates: 41°36′N 0°53′E
- Country: Spain
- Community: Catalonia
- Province: Lleida
- Comarca: Pla d'Urgell

Government
  - Mayor: Carme Ribes Llordés (2019)

Area
  - Total: 14.9 km^{2} (5.8 sq mi)

Population (2025-01-01)
  - Total: 1,369
  - Density: 91.9/km^{2} (238/sq mi)
- Website: miralcamp.cat

Miralcamp (Catalan pronunciation: [miɾalˈkam], lit. 'look at the field') is a village in the province of Lleida and autonomous community of Catalonia, Spain.

== Climate ==
The climate is continental, or more detail mediterranean strong continental influence, and on which their situation in a depression and the contact with the climate of the Pyrenees have an important influence. It is a dry and arid climate with average temperatures of 14–16° and oscillations ranging between 38 °C in summer and 0° in winter. Rainfall is low and erratic and banks are common fog by its location in a valley basin Segre, which are more common in autumn and winter.
