= Castellnou de Seana =

- Municipality
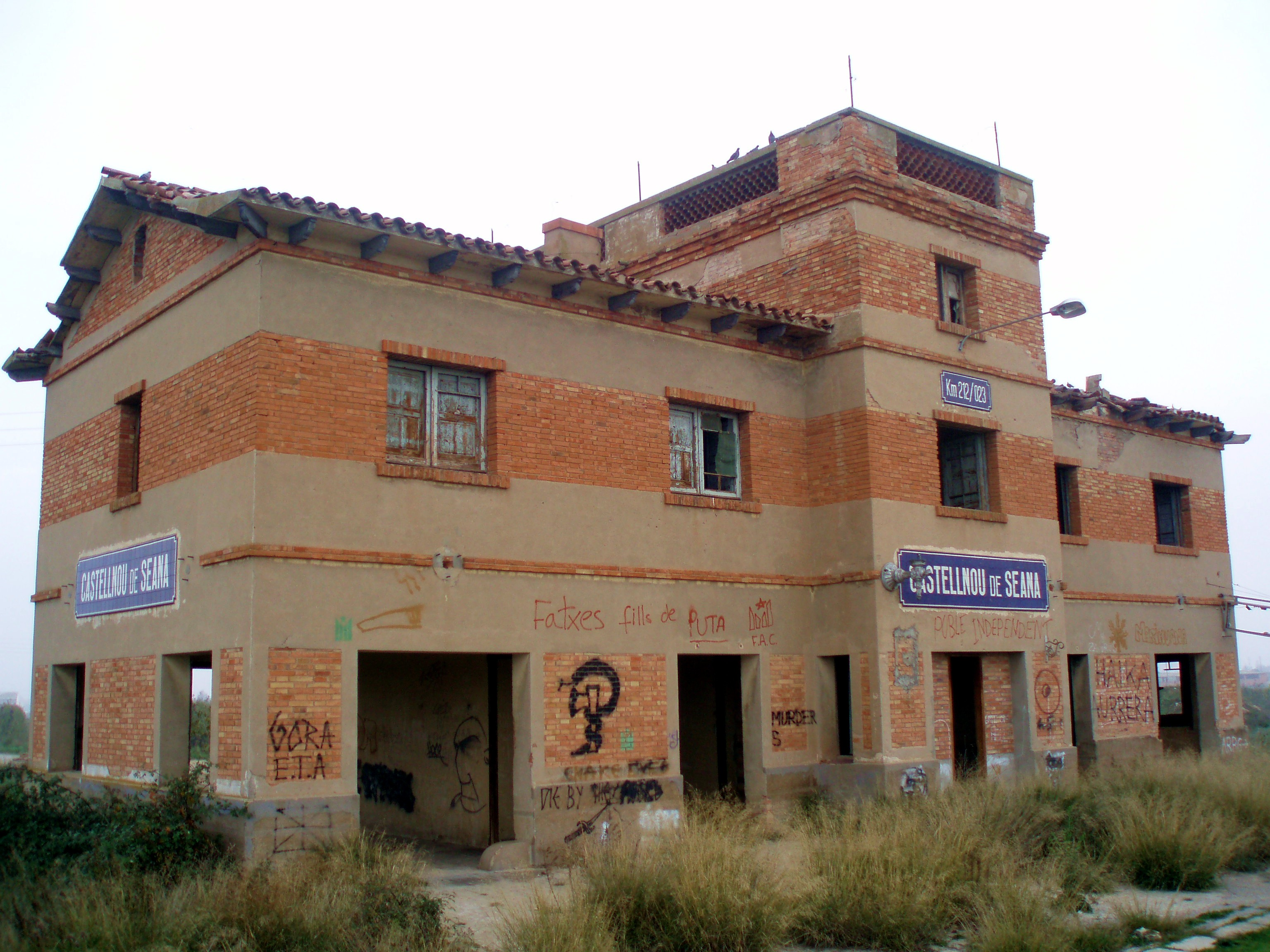
- Castellnou de Seana station

- Coat of arms

- Location in the Province of Lleida Location in Catalonia Location in Spain
- Coordinates: 41°39′N 0°58′E
- Country: Spain
- Community: Catalonia
- Province: Lleida
- Comarca: Pla d'Urgell

Government
  - Mayor: Jordi Llanes Valls (2015)

Area
  - Total: 16.1 km^{2} (6.2 sq mi)

Population (2025-01-01)
  - Total: 726
  - Density: 45.1/km^{2} (117/sq mi)
- Website: castellnouseana.ddl.net

Castellnou de Seana (Catalan pronunciation: [kasˌteʎˈnɔw ðe seˈanɛ]) is a village in the province of Lleida and autonomous community of Catalonia, Spain.

== Notable people ==
- Ramón Moya (born 2 March 1956) is a Spanish retired footballer who played as a defender, and a current coach.
