= Golmés =

- Municipality
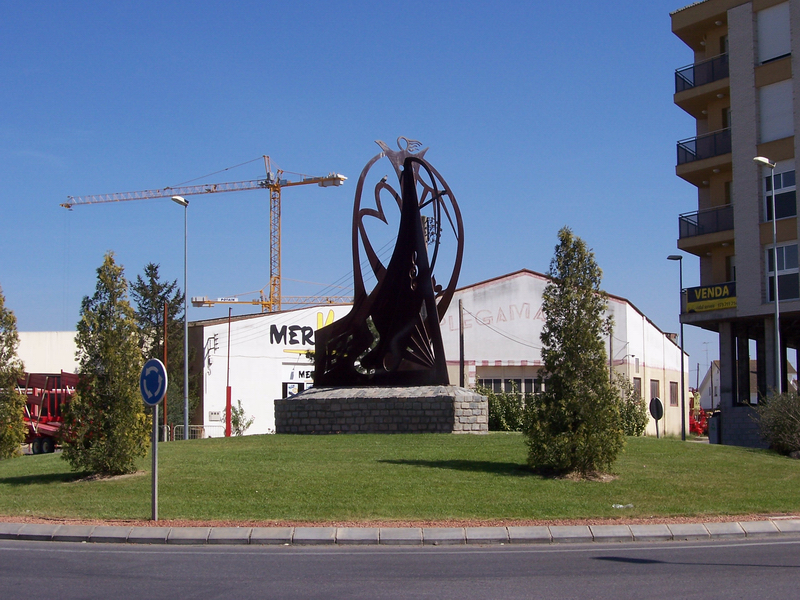
- Roundabout at town entrance

- Coat of arms

- Location in Catalonia
- Coordinates: 41°38′N 0°56′E
- Country: Spain
- Community: Catalonia
- Province: Lleida
- Comarca: Pla d'Urgell

Government
  - Mayor: Jordi Calvís Torrelles (2015)

Area
  - Total: 16.6 km^{2} (6.4 sq mi)

Population (2025-01-01)
  - Total: 1,909
  - Density: 115/km^{2} (298/sq mi)
- Website: golmes.cat

Golmés (Catalan pronunciation: [golˈmes]) is a village in the province of Lleida and autonomous community of Catalonia, Spain.
