= Barbens =

- Municipality
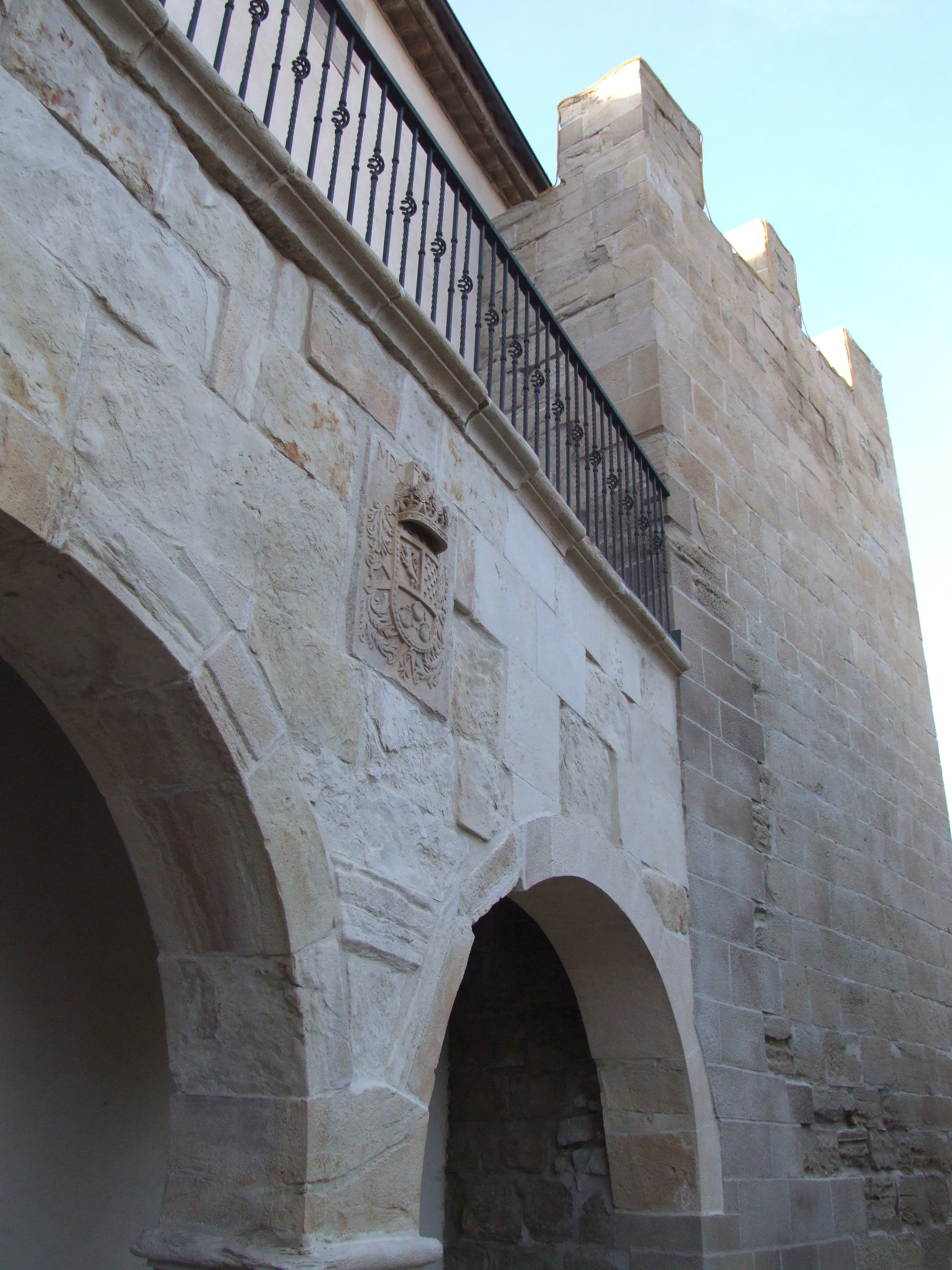
- Barbens castle

- Coat of arms

- Location in Catalonia
- Coordinates: 41°40′47″N 1°1′5″E
- Country: Spain
- Community: Catalonia
- Province: Lleida
- Comarca: Pla d'Urgell

Government
  - Mayor: Andreu Benet Castillo (2019)

Area
  - Total: 7.6 km^{2} (2.9 sq mi)
- Elevation: 283 m (928 ft)

Population (2025-01-01)
  - Total: 929
  - Density: 120/km^{2} (320/sq mi)
- Climate: Cfa
- Website: barbens.ddl.net

Barbens (Catalan pronunciation: [baɾˈβɛns]) is a municipality in the comarca of the Pla d'Urgell in Catalonia, Spain. As of 2007, it has 836 inhabitants. The municipality is split into two parts, the bigger western part containing Barbens town.

== Demography ==
1900	1930	1950	1970	1986	2007
812	1004	996	812	794	836
