= Ivars d'Urgell =

- Municipality
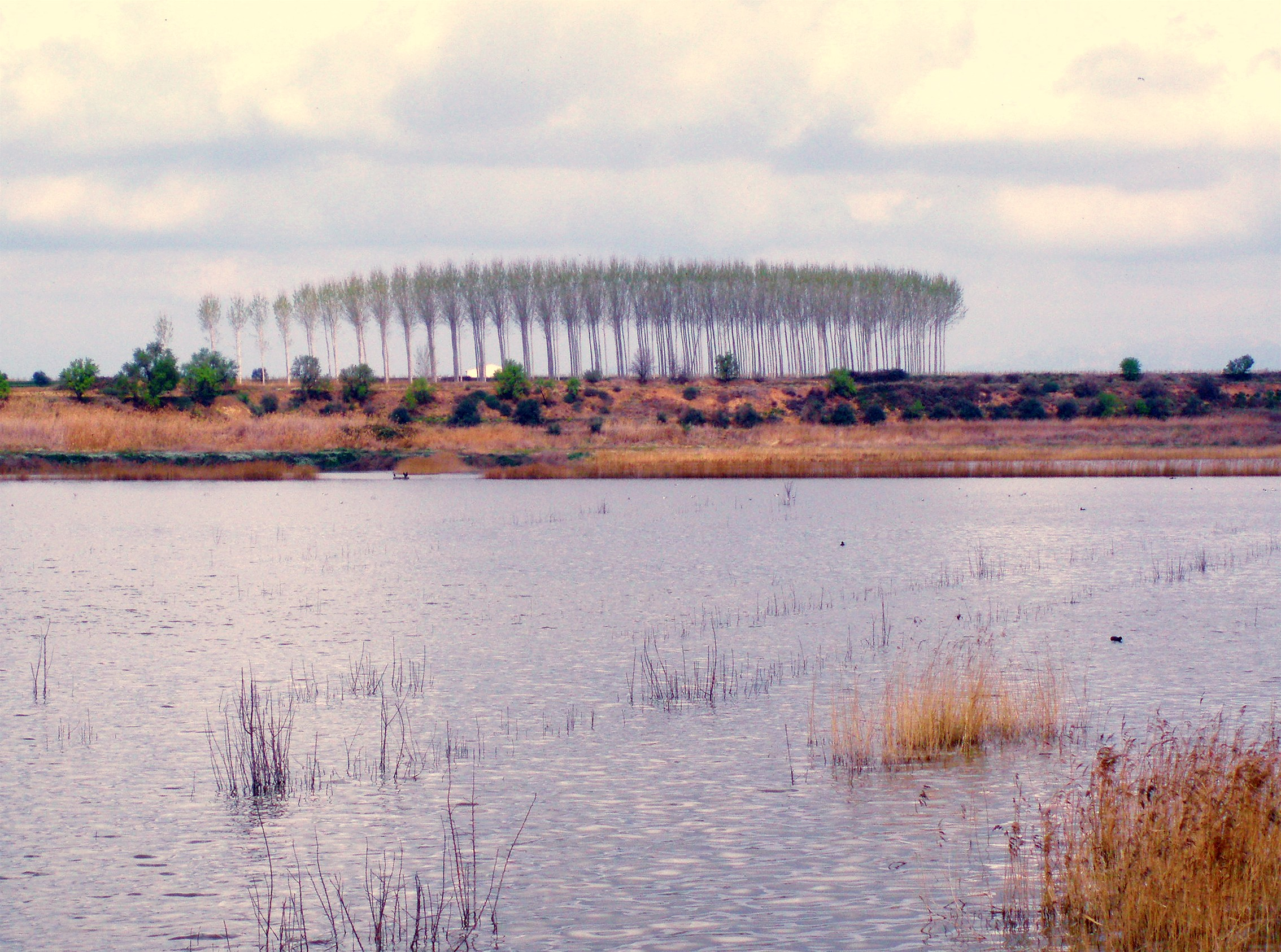
- Ivars lake

- Flag Coat of arms

- Location in Catalonia
- Coordinates: 41°40′50″N 0°59′12″E
- Country: Spain
- Community: Catalonia
- Province: Lleida
- Comarca: Pla d'Urgell

Government
  - Mayor: Joan Carles Sànchez (2019)

Area
  - Total: 24.3 km^{2} (9.4 sq mi)

Population (2025-01-01)
  - Total: 1,578
  - Density: 64.9/km^{2} (168/sq mi)
- Website: ivarsdurgell.cat

Ivars d'Urgell (Catalan pronunciation: [iˈβaɾz ðuɾˈdʒeʎ]) is a village and municipality in the province of Lleida and autonomous community of Catalonia, Spain.
