= Vilanova de Bellpuig =

- Municipality
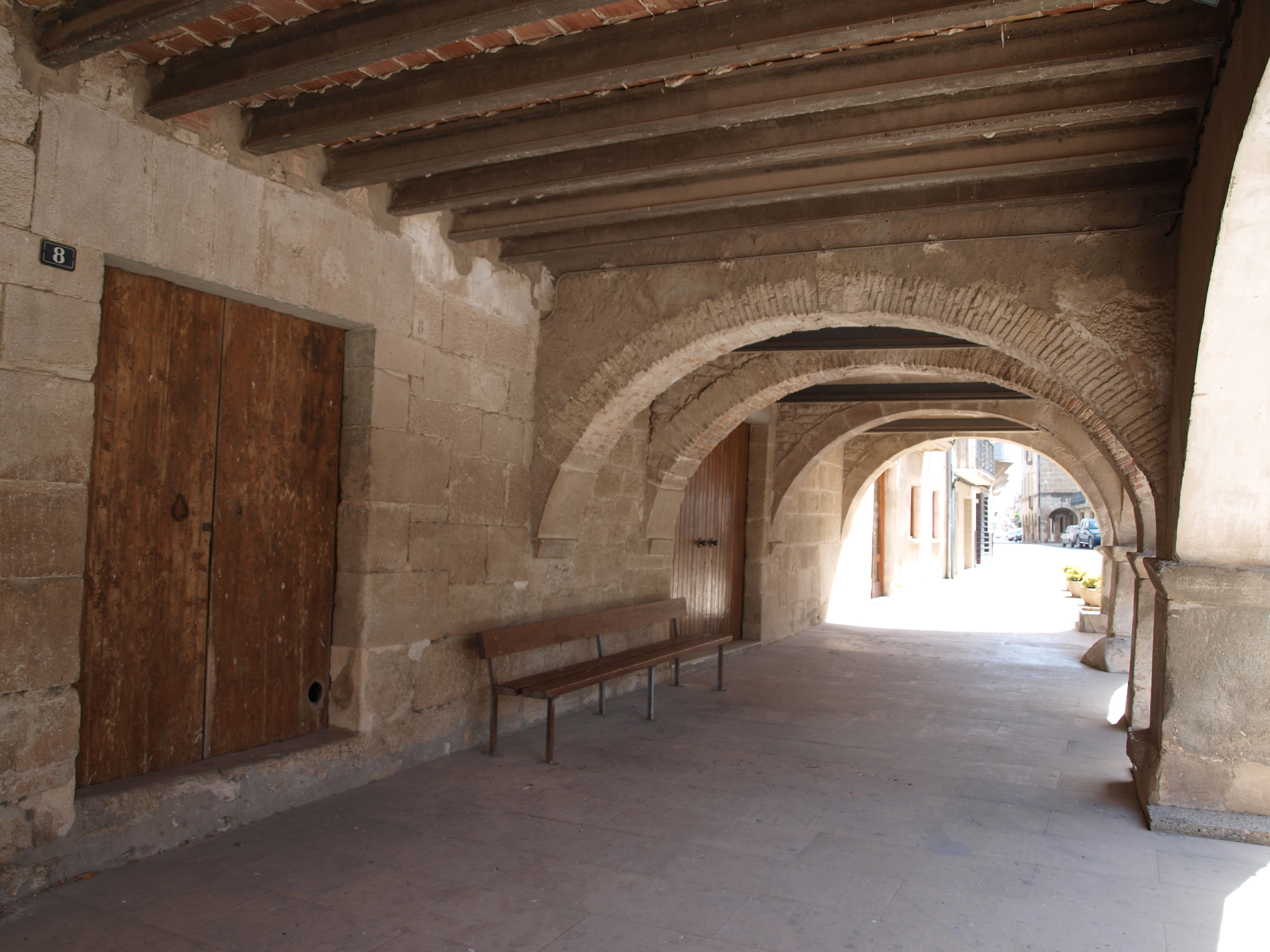
- Carrer Dr. Gassol, Vilanova

- Coat of arms

- Location in Catalonia
- Coordinates: 41°37′N 0°58′E
- Country: Spain
- Community: Catalonia
- Province: Lleida
- Comarca: Pla d'Urgell

Government
  - Mayor: Joan Trull Borràs (2015)

Area
  - Total: 14.0 km^{2} (5.4 sq mi)

Population (2025-01-01)
  - Total: 1,150
  - Density: 82.1/km^{2} (213/sq mi)
- Website: vilanovabellpuig.ddl.net

Vilanova de Bellpuig (Catalan pronunciation: [ˌbilaˈnɔβɛ ðe βeʎˈputʃ]) is a village in the province of Lleida and autonomous community of Catalonia, Spain.
