= Fondarella =

- Municipality
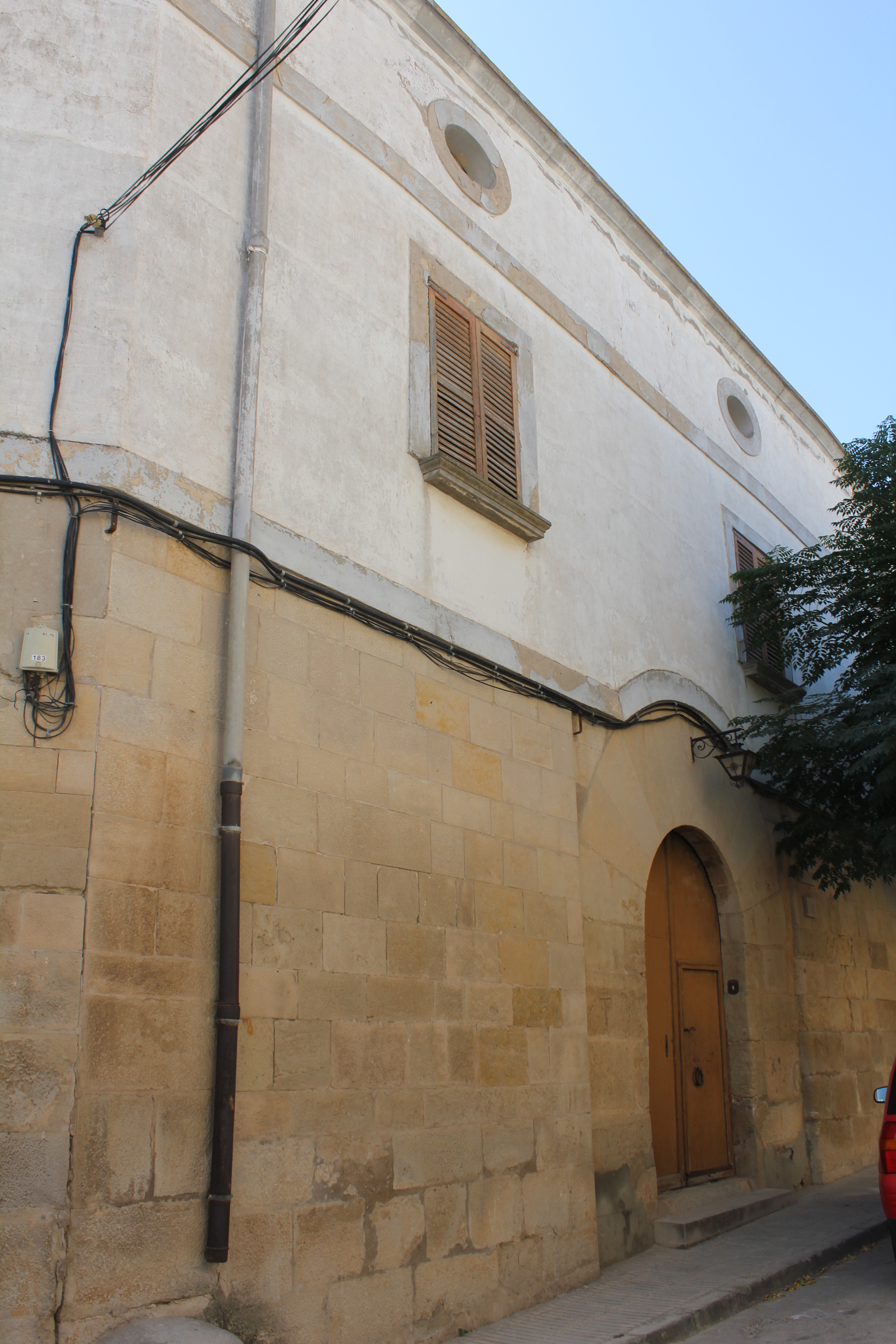
- Cal Combelles (Fondarella)

- Coat of arms

- Location in Catalonia
- Coordinates: 41°38′N 0°52′E
- Country: Spain
- Community: Catalonia
- Province: Lleida
- Comarca: Pla d'Urgell

Government
  - Mayor: Joan Reñé Huguet (2015)

Area
  - Total: 5.4 km^{2} (2.1 sq mi)

Population (2025-01-01)
  - Total: 823
  - Density: 150/km^{2} (390/sq mi)
- Website: fondarella.ddl.net

Fondarella (Catalan pronunciation: [fondaˈɾeʎɛ]) is a village in the province of Lleida and autonomous community of Catalonia, Spain.
