= Vila-sana =

- Municipality
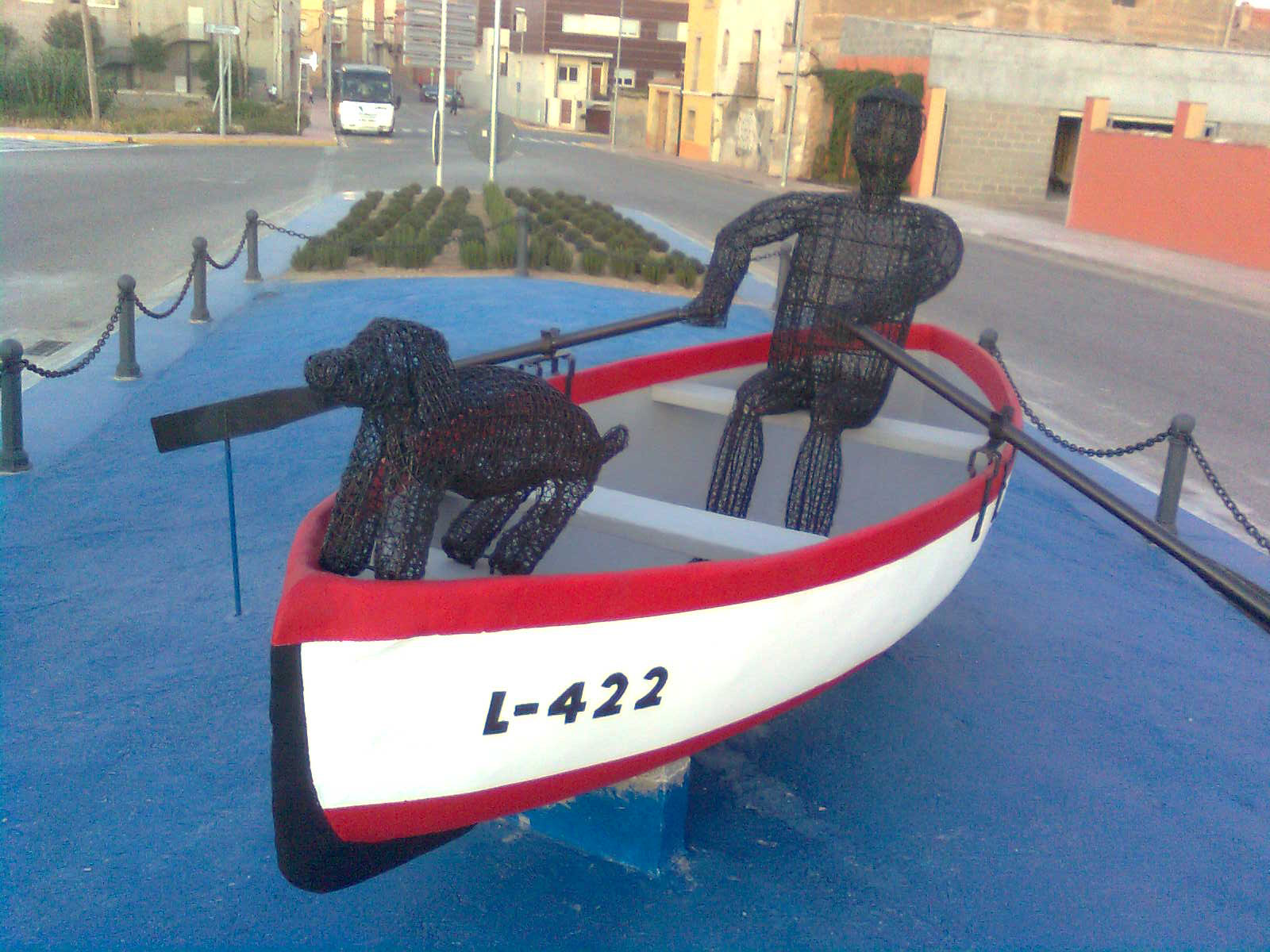
- Monument at village entrance

- Flag Coat of arms

- Location in Catalonia
- Coordinates: 41°39′51″N 0°55′48″E
- Country: Spain
- Community: Catalonia
- Province: Lleida
- Comarca: Pla d'Urgell

Government
  - Mayor: Joan Ramon Sangrà Farré (2015)

Area
  - Total: 19.1 km^{2} (7.4 sq mi)

Population (2025-01-01)
  - Total: 753
  - Density: 39.4/km^{2} (102/sq mi)
- Website: vilasana.ddl.net

Vila-sana (Catalan pronunciation: [ˌbilaˈsanɛ]) is a village and municipality in the province of Lleida and autonomous community of Catalonia, Spain.
