= Linyola =

- Municipality
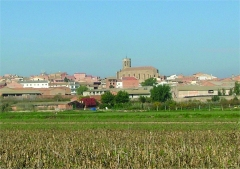
- Linyola

- Coat of arms

- Location in Catalonia
- Coordinates: 41°42′36″N 0°54′6″E
- Country: Spain
- Community: Catalonia
- Province: Lleida
- Comarca: Pla d'Urgell

Government
  - Mayor: Alexandre Mases Xifré (2015)

Area
  - Total: 28.7 km^{2} (11.1 sq mi)

Population (2025-01-01)
  - Total: 2,762
  - Density: 96.2/km^{2} (249/sq mi)
- Website: linyola.ddl.net

Linyola (Catalan pronunciation: [liˈɲɔlɛ]) is a municipality in the comarca of Pla d'Urgell in Catalonia, Spain.

Notable individuals associated with Linyola:

- Josep Maria Fusté (1941–2023), former FC Barcelona midfielder, was born here.
- Bojan Krkić (1990), Vissel Kobe forward (association football), was born here.

Marcs Puigarnau (1979), FC Barcelona (association football)#Centre Back defender, was born here.
