= Diari Segre =

Spanish regional daily newspaper

- Type: Regional daily newspaper
- Format: Tabloid
- Owner: Diari Segre Media Group
- Founded: September 3, 1982; 43 years ago
- Language: Spanish; Catalan
- Headquarters: Lleida
- Country: Spain
- ISSN: 1576-5318
- OCLC number: 733266728
- Website: Diari Segre

Diari Segre or simply Segre is a Spanish and Catalan language daily newspaper published in Lleida, Spain.

== History and profile ==
Diari Segre was started in 1982. In the first issue the paper declared that it was an independent publication. The founding editor-in-chief was Manuel Fernández Areal.

It is part of the company with the same name, Diari Segre Media Group. Its headquarters is in Lleida, and it serves the Lleida province. The paper is published in tabloid format. In 1997 it initiated its Catalan language version, being the first Spain newspaper to have two editions published in two distinct languages.

As of 2015 Juan Cal Sanchez was the editor-in-chief of Diari Segre.

== Circulation ==
Diari Segre had a circulation of 8,000 copies in 1990. In 2002 the Spanish version of Diari Segre had a circulation of 6,713 copies in its distribution area. Its circulation was 7,145 copies in 2003 and 6,855 copies in 2004. The paper sold 6,710 copies in 2005 and 6,520 copies in 2006. During the period between 2002 and 2006 its Catalan version had much smaller circulation.
