= Pla d'Urgell =

Coordinates: 41°38′40″N 0°54′46″E

- Comarca
- Flag Coat of arms

- Country: Spain
- Autonomous community: Catalonia
- Region: Ponent
- Province: Lleida
- Capital: Mollerussa
- Municipalities: List: Barbens, Bell-lloc d'Urgell, Bellvís, Castellnou de Seana, Fondarella, Golmés, Ivars d'Urgell, Linyola, Miralcamp, Mollerussa, El Palau d'Anglesola, Poal, Sidamon, Torregrossa, Vila-sana, Vilanova de Bellpuig

Government
  - Body: Pla d'Urgell Comarcal Council
  - President: Carles Palau (ERC)

Area
  - Total: 305.2 km^{2} (117.8 sq mi)

Population (2014)
  - Total: 37,128
  - Density: 121.7/km^{2} (315.1/sq mi)
- Demonym
- Time zone: UTC+1 (CET)
  - Summer (DST): UTC+2 (CEST)
- Website: https://www.plaurgell.cat

Pla d'Urgell (Catalan pronunciation: [ˈpla ðuɾˈʒeʎ]) is a comarca (county) in the Ponent region of Catalonia, Spain. The capital is the city of Mollerussa.

== Municipalities ==
Municipality	Population (2014)	Area km^{2}
Barbens	875	7.6
Bell-lloc d'Urgell	2,351	34.9
Bellvís	2,342	46.7
Castellnou de Seana	740	16.1
Fondarella	838	5.4
Golmés	1,734	16.6
Ivars d'Urgell	1,607	24.3
Linyola	2,677	28.7
Miralcamp	1,384	14.9
Mollerussa	14,963	7.1
El Palau d'Anglesola	2,135	12.3
El Poal	656	8.9
Sidamon	706	8.1
Torregrossa	2,235	40.5
Vila-sana	706	19.1
Vilanova de Bellpuig	1,179	14.0
• Total: 16	37,128	305.2
