= Penedès (division) =

Coordinates: 42°04′01″N 2°38′26″E

- Vegueria
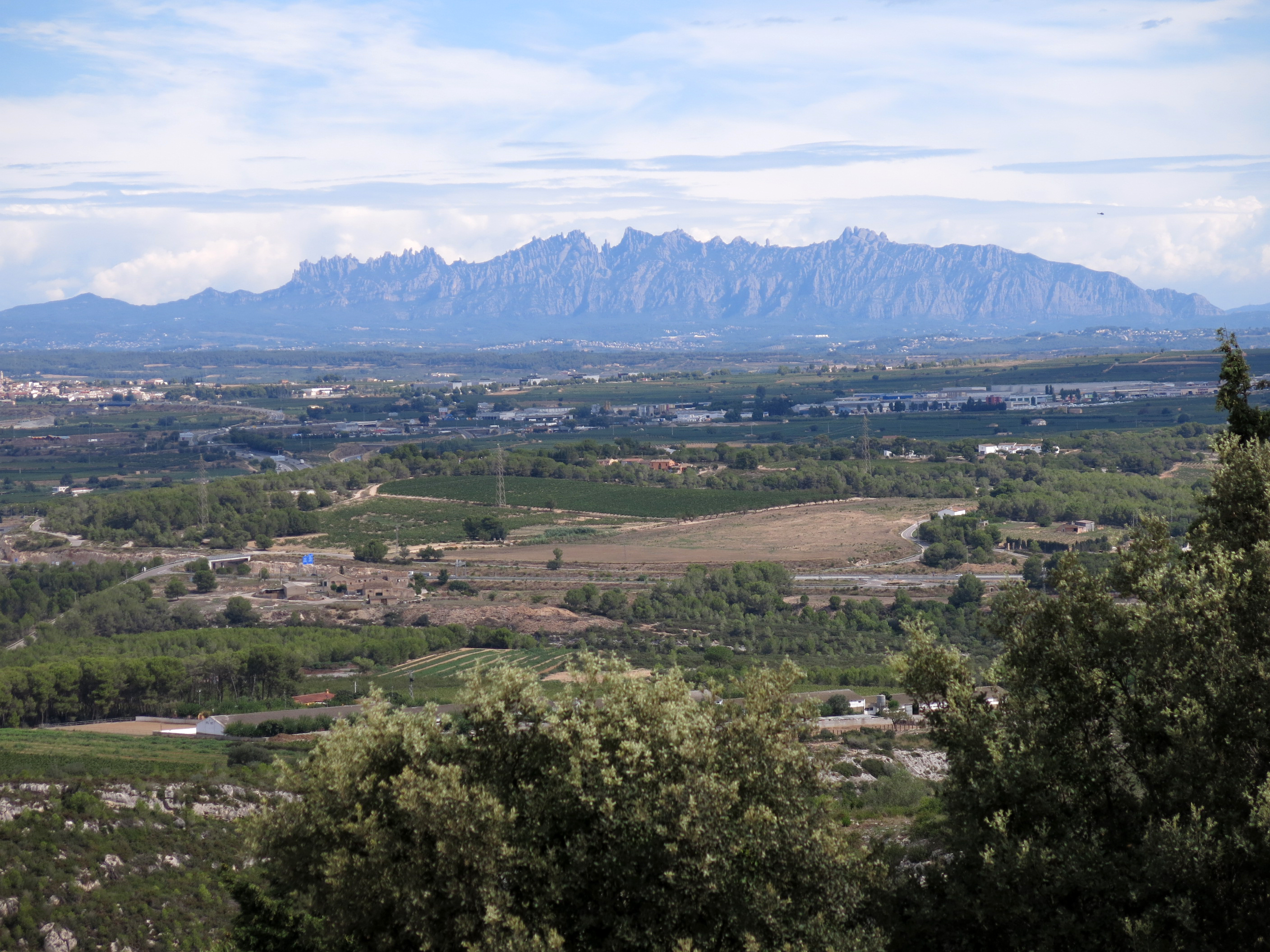
- Montserrat from Olèrdola

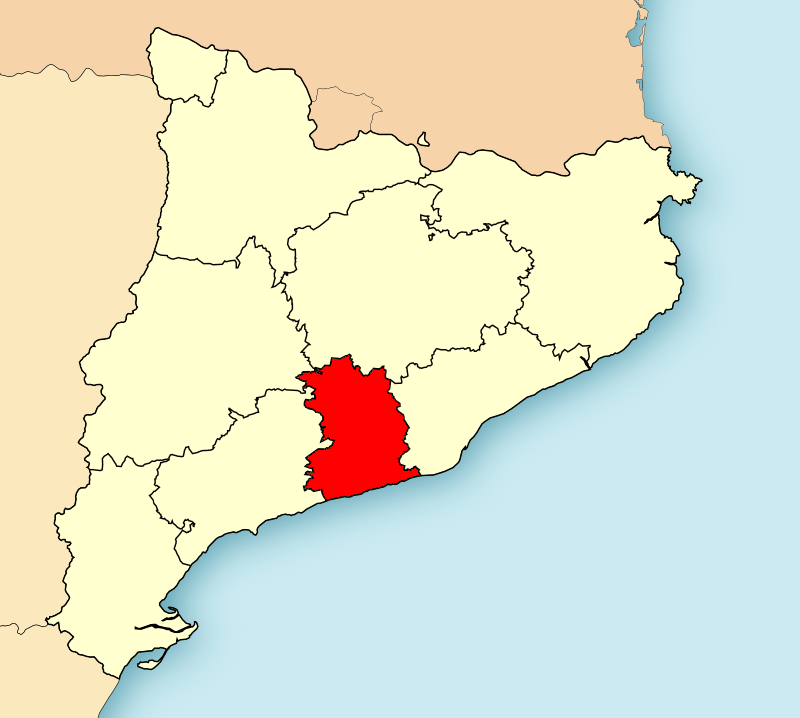
- Sovereign state: Spain
- Community: Catalonia
- Capital: -
- Counties: Alt Penedès; Anoia (partially); Baix Penedès; Garraf

Area
  - Total: 1,746 km^{2} (674 sq mi)

Population (2025)
  - Total: 525,580
  - Density: 301.0/km^{2} (779.6/sq mi)

Penedès is one of the nine regions (vegueries) defined by the Regional Plan of Catalonia. Located in south of Catalonia, it includes the comarques from historical Penedès region (Alt Penedès, Baix Penedès and Garraf), along with the southern municipalities of Anoia. It had 525,580 inhabitants as of 2025. It was approved as a region in February 2017.

Its de facto capital is Vilanova i la Geltrú, the most populous city, as a law has not set one yet.

== Demography ==
Penedès is composed of four different comarques.

Comarca	Capital	Population (2025)	Area (km^{2})
Alt Penedès	Vilafranca del Penedès	116,098	593
Anoia	Igualada	129,956	866
Baix Penedès	El Vendrell	120,720	296
Garraf	Vilanova i la Geltrú	164,223	185
