= Bell-lloc d'Urgell =

- Municipality
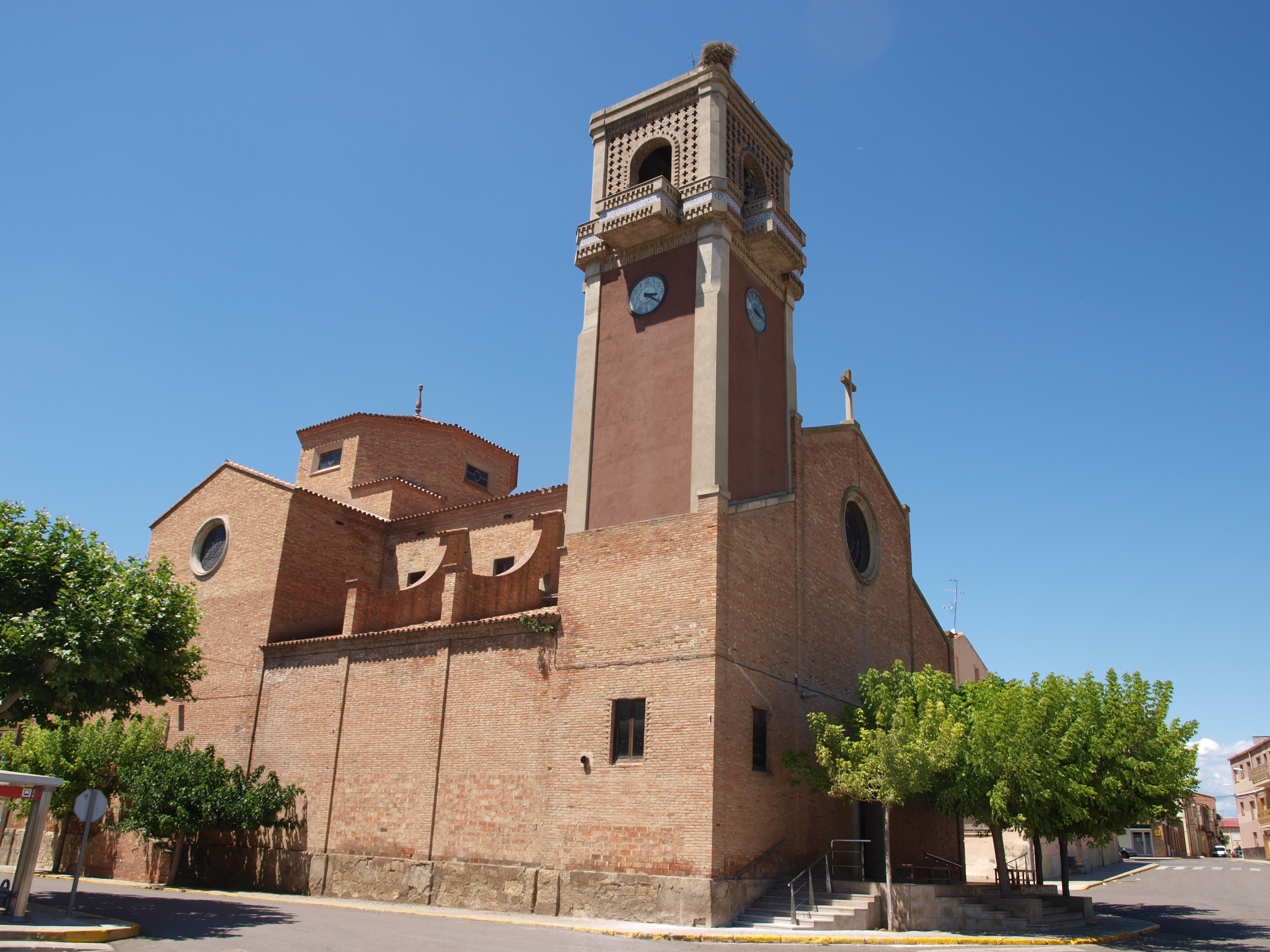
- Bell-lloc parish church

- Coat of arms

- Location in Catalonia
- Coordinates: 41°37′51″N 0°46′44″E
- Country: Spain
- Community: Catalonia
- Province: Lleida
- Comarca: Pla d'Urgell

Government
  - Mayor: Carles Albert Palau Boté (2015)

Area
  - Total: 34.9 km^{2} (13.5 sq mi)

Population (2025-01-01)
  - Total: 2,364
  - Density: 67.7/km^{2} (175/sq mi)
- Website: bell-lloc.cat

Bell-lloc d'Urgell (Catalan pronunciation: [ˌbeʎˈʎɔg duɾˈdʒeʎ]) is a village in the province of Lleida and autonomous community of Catalonia, Spain.
