= Mollerussa =

- Municipality
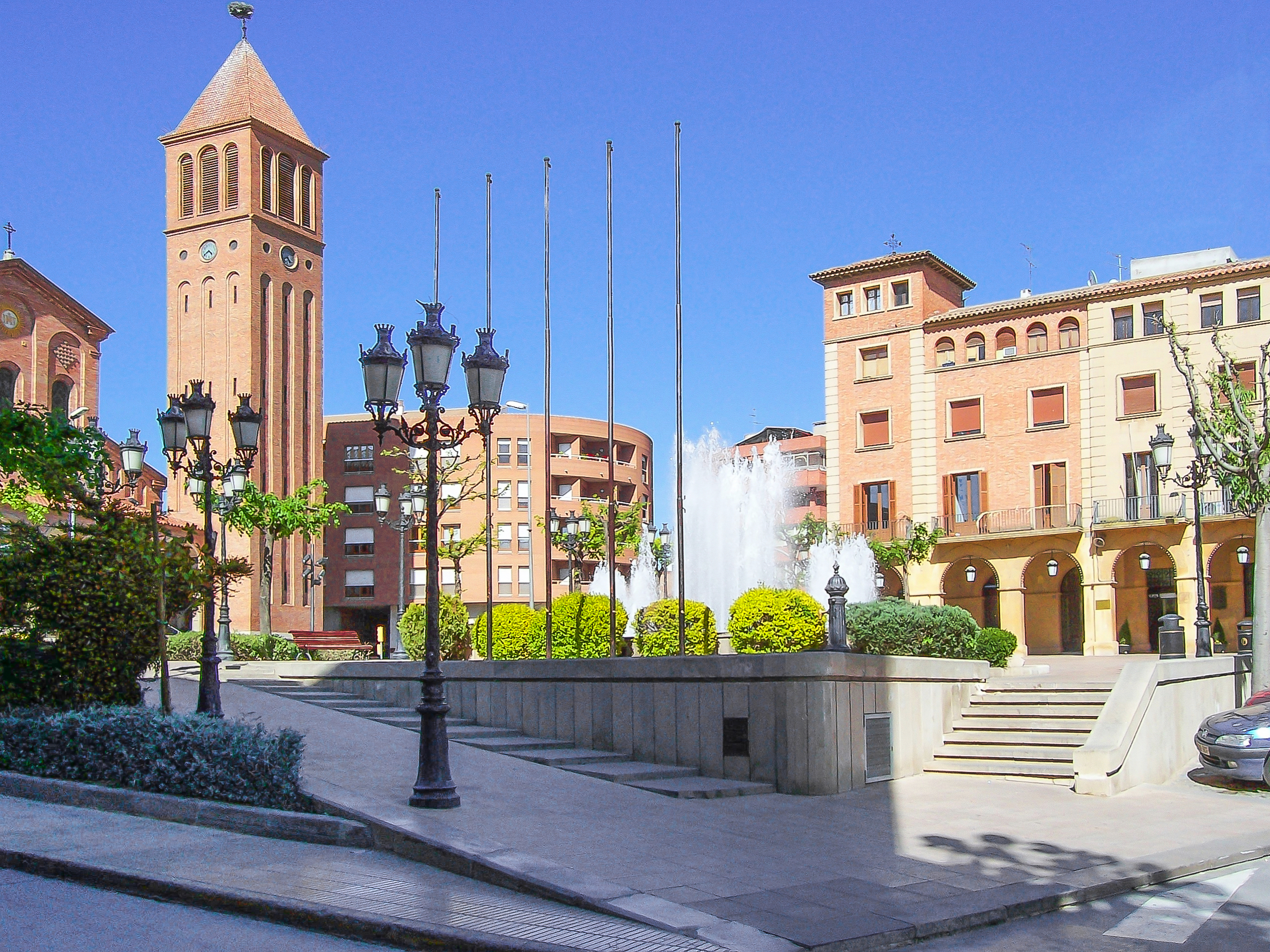
- Plaça de l'Ajuntament

- Coat of arms

- Location in Catalonia Mollerussa (Catalonia) Mollerussa (Spain)
- Coordinates: 41°37′55″N 0°53′46″E
- Country: Spain
- Community: Catalonia
- Province: Lleida
- Comarca: Pla d'Urgell

Government
  - Mayor: Marc Solsona Aixalà (2015) (Mollerussa Primer)

Area
  - Total: 7.1 km^{2} (2.7 sq mi)
- Elevation: 250 m (820 ft)

Population (2025-01-01)
  - Total: 15,763
  - Density: 2,200/km^{2} (5,800/sq mi)
- Climate: Cfa
- Website: mollerussa.cat

Mollerussa (Western Catalan: [moʎeˈɾusa]) is the capital of the comarca of Pla d'Urgell, in the province of Lleida, Catalonia, Spain. It is 250 metres above sea level. In 2010 it had a population of 15,763 (register office, 2025).

The town has grown since the 19th century around the Urgel canal, which transports water from the river Segre to the nearby fields. The installation of the irrigation syndicate made the town the administrative headquarters of the region's farmers, and from the 20th century onwards, both agriculture and industry developed.

Demography:

Year	1986	1991	1996	2001	2004	2006	2008	2010
Population	8,462	8,966	9,400	10,004	11,087	12,569	13,675	14,733

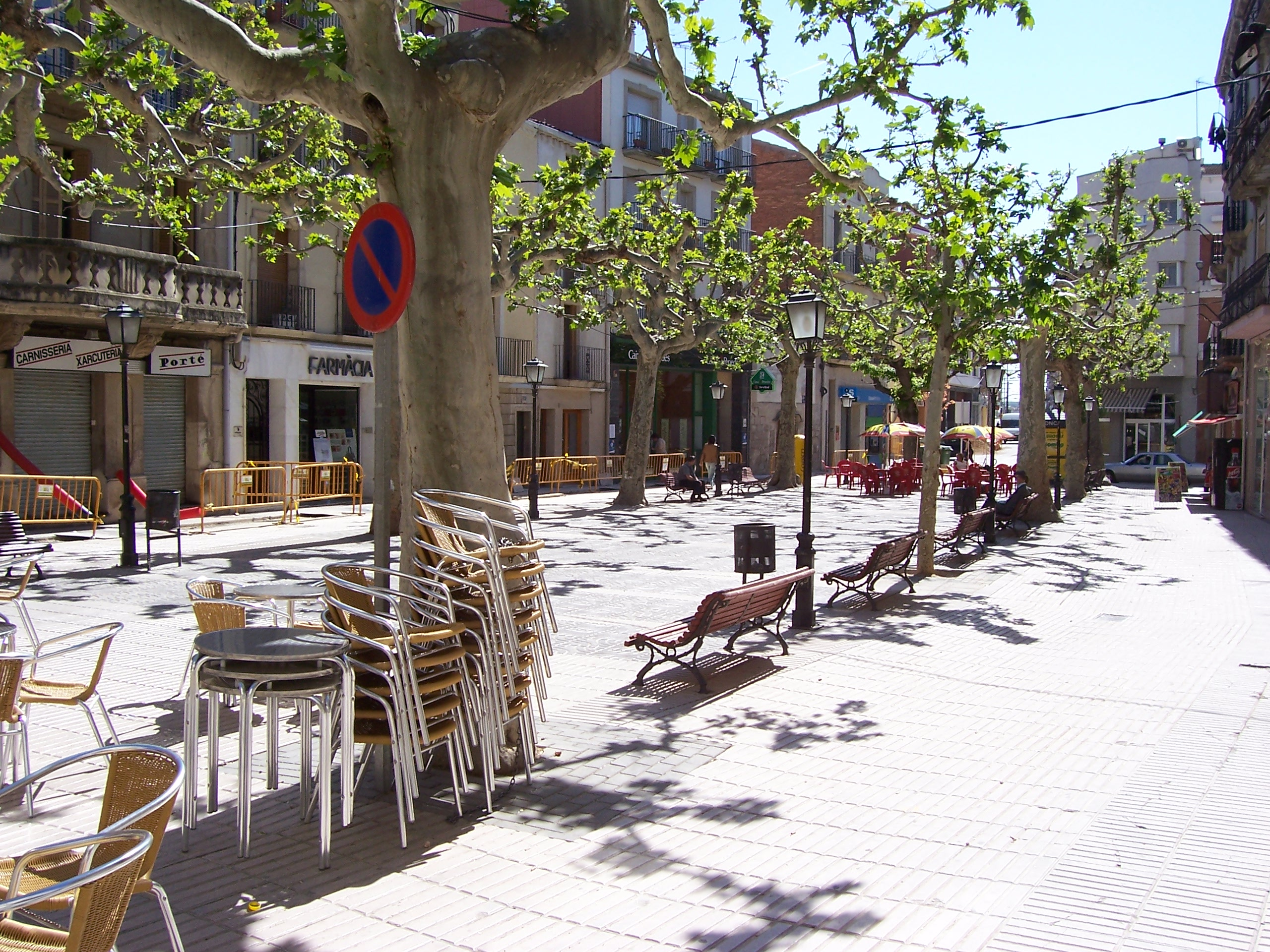
Major square

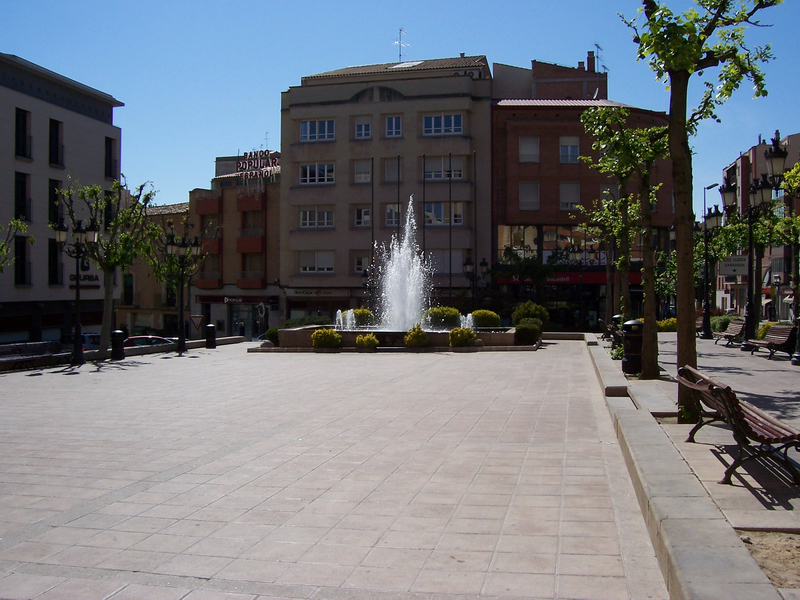
Fountain in the city hall square

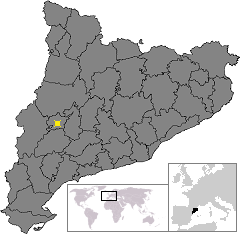
Location of Mollerussa
