= 2009–2011 Catalan independence referendums =

Referendums in the Spanish region of Catalonia

The 2009–2011 Catalan independence referendums, a series of non-binding and unofficial referendums, "popular votes" (consultes populars), took place in municipalities around Catalonia. In them voters indicated whether they supported Catalan independence from Spain. The first such referendum took place in Arenys de Munt on 13 September 2009: there followed votes in Sant Jaume de Frontanyà on 12 December and in 166 other municipalities on 13 December. Another vote ensued in April 2011 in Barcelona.

Provisional figures for the 13 December vote suggest a turnout of around 200,000 (30% of those eligible to vote).

== Context ==
The referendum in Arenys de Munt was called by the municipality following a motion in the town council by councillors from the Popular Unity Candidates (CUP). It came a time of growing frustration in "catalanist" circles at the delays in implementing the Statute of Autonomy of 2006. In particular, more than one-third of the provisions of the Statute had been appealed to the Constitutional Court of Spain by the People's Party, the largest opposition party in the Cortes Generales (Spanish parliament). More than three years later, the Constitutional Court had still not decided the case, with the ten judges in an unprecedented and increasingly politicised deadlock.

The relative success of the vote in Arenys de Munt, with a turnout of 41% and despite the efforts of the Spanish government to prevent the referendum, led to similar movements appearing in other Catalan municipalities. Given the difficulties of organising a vote without official support, the consultations were not all programmed for the same day: it had been hoped to organise votes in October 2009, but the date of 13 December was chosen for the next round of voting in 167 municipalities (Sant Jaume de Frontanyà, the smallest municipality in Catalonia with just 21 voters, decided to advance the poll by one day).

== Legal Background in Spanish Constitutional Law ==
The Spanish Constitution of 1978 allows for consultative referendums on "political decisions of special importance" (Art. 92): however, the holding of such a referendum requires the approval of both the government and the Congress of Deputies (the lower house of the Cortes Generales).

Art. 2 of the 1978 Constitution also refers to "the indissoluble unity of the Spanish Nation, the common and indivisible homeland of all Spaniards," which would appear to imply that the de jure independence of any of the autonomous communities would have to come about, in the first instance, through a constitutional amendment to Article 2 itself.

Such an amendment process would, if undertaken, take place under the onerous provisions of Art. 168, requiring:

- Firstly a two-thirds majority of both chambers of the Cortes Generales;
- Secondly the dissolution of the Cortes Generales followed by a general election;
- Thirdly a reapproval of the amendment by a two-thirds majority in both chambers of this newly elected Cortes Generales; and
- Fourthly by subsequent ratification in a national referendum held in all of Spain.

== Phases ==
Yes No

The consultations on the independence of the Catalan nation took place in several stages:

1. September 13, 2009: First referendum, in Arenys de Munt.
2. 12 and December 13, 2009: Referendums held in 167 municipalities. This phase was done in two days:
  - December 12, 2009: Referendum in Sant Jaume de Frontanyà.
  - December 13, 2009: Referendums held in 166 municipalities.
3. February 28, 2010: Third stage of consultations in 80 municipalities.
4. 24 and April 25, 2010: Fourth stage of consultations in 211 municipalities.
  - April 24, 2010: Referendum in Esparraguera.
  - April 25, 2010: Referendums held in 210 municipalities, including the cities of Girona and Lleida.
5. May 30, 2010: Referendum in Sabadell.
6. June 20, 2010: Fifth stage of referendums.
7. April 10, 2011: Referendum in Barcelona.

== Beginning ==
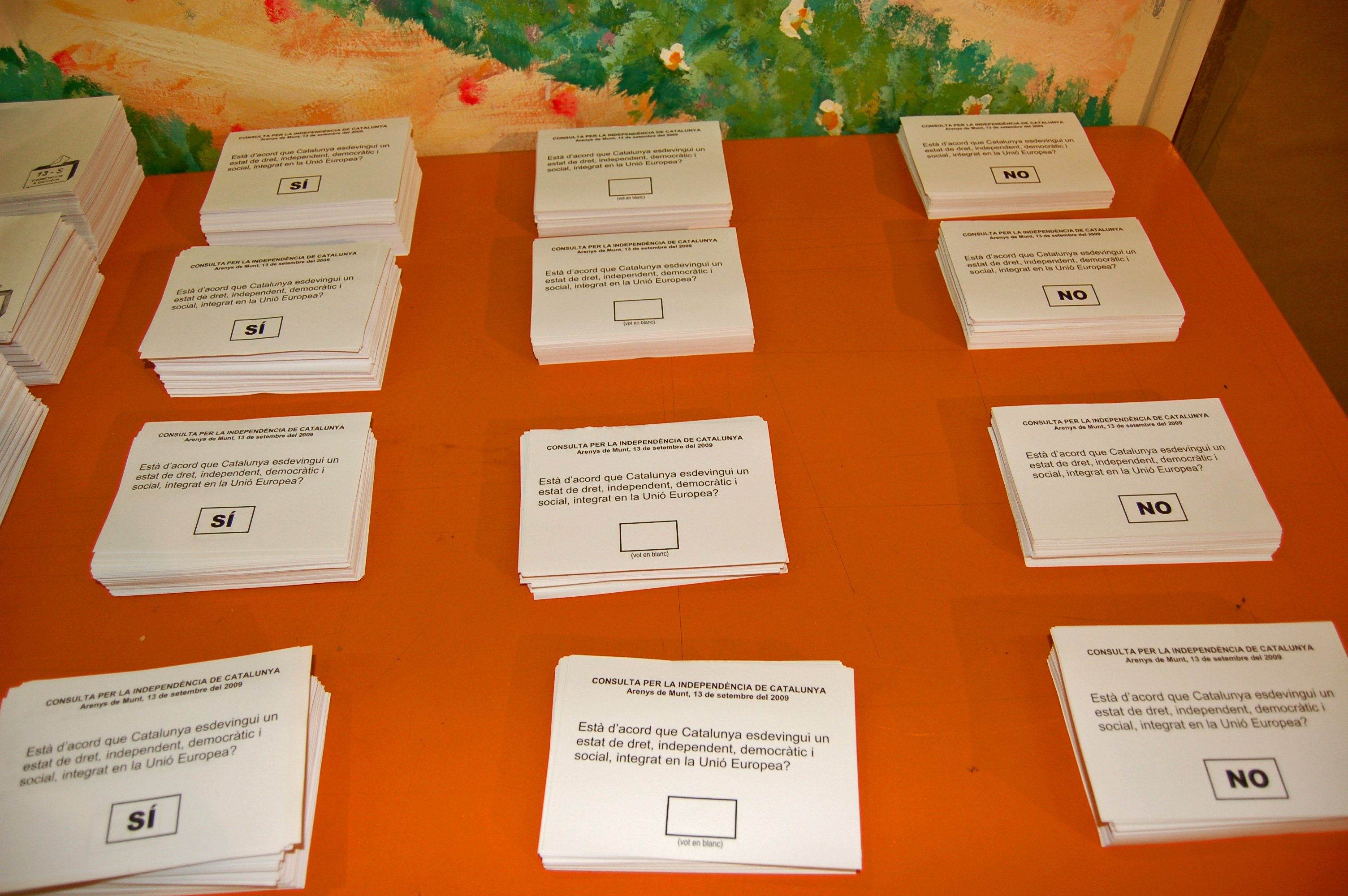
Voting ballots used in the Arenys de Munt query on Catalonia independence

A local referendum, in the town of Arenys de Munt, was the first vote ever held on the question of Catalan independence, and led to a series of parallel non-binding referendums on the independence question in late 2009 and early 2010. The process began on 4 June 2009, when the municipal council in Arenys de Munt voted in favour of a motion presented by Popular Unity Candidates (CUP), calling for a non-binding referendum on independence for Catalonia. The council sought to make locations available at which voters could cast ballots, and to facilitate the organization of the vote, but a court ruling overruled the council's decision and the council had to abandon its efforts to facilitate the referendum. The referendum organizing committee then rented the "Centre Moral" (a sort of social club, a private entity) of the village in order to be able to conduct the vote. The Council continued to support to the initiative in principle, even though it complied with the court ruling. The mayor of Arenys de Munt, Carles Móra, was particularly vocal in his support.

=== Referendum of September 13 (Arenys de Munt) ===
Residents of the town of Arenys de Munt were asked the following question: Està d'acord que Catalunya esdevingui un Estat de dret, independent, democràtic i social, integrat a la Unió Europea? (Do you agree on Catalonia becoming an independent, democratic and social constitutional state, integrated in the European Union?). Despite the unofficial nature of the referendum, the relatively high participation rate (41%), which was higher than the one reached in the last European election and in the Spanish constitutional referendum of 1978, gave credibility to the exercise. The "Yes" side won a commanding 96.2% of valid votes, while the "No" obtained 2.3%.

=== Reactions to the Arenys de Munt referendum ===
The Arenys de Munt referendum has been a historical precedent and many political parties, organizations and platforms showed their agreement.

- Political parties like Republican Left of Catalonia, Popular Unity Candidates (CUP) and some prominent politicians of Convergence and Union and Initiative for Catalonia Greens gave full support to the query.
- Meanwhile, groups like the People's Party (PP), Ciutadans, Democratic Union of Catalonia (UDC) and a large sector of the Socialists' Party of Catalonia (PSC) showed clear disagreement with the query.
- Some members of the PSC and UDC played down the query.

The same night of the query, there were councils all over Catalonia who were interested to follow the lead of Arenys de Munt such as Argentona or Seròs.

In general, the initiative was criticized by the Spanish government, both Spanish Socialist Workers' Party (PSOE) and PP, and following the vote was open conflict between the two parties, as the PP accused the PSOE of having allowed an illegal query.

Internationally, the echo was also quite important: three hundred journalists were accredited to monitor the day, and several television stations were in Arenys de Munt to monitor the event.

=== Referendums following the vote in Arenys de Munt ===
During the same night of the Arenys de Munt query, many municipalities in Catalonia showed up in favor of queries like the one that had organized the town of the Maresme. The following days, several consistories began to approve motions of support for queries on the independence promoted by entities of neighbors of the towns. Many separatist organizations supported the queries, until the Coordinator for the Consultation on Independence appeared, which will organize altogether. Thus began to emerge queries in the whole Catalan range that will be held in phases.

== Query of 13-D ==
=== Course of the day ===
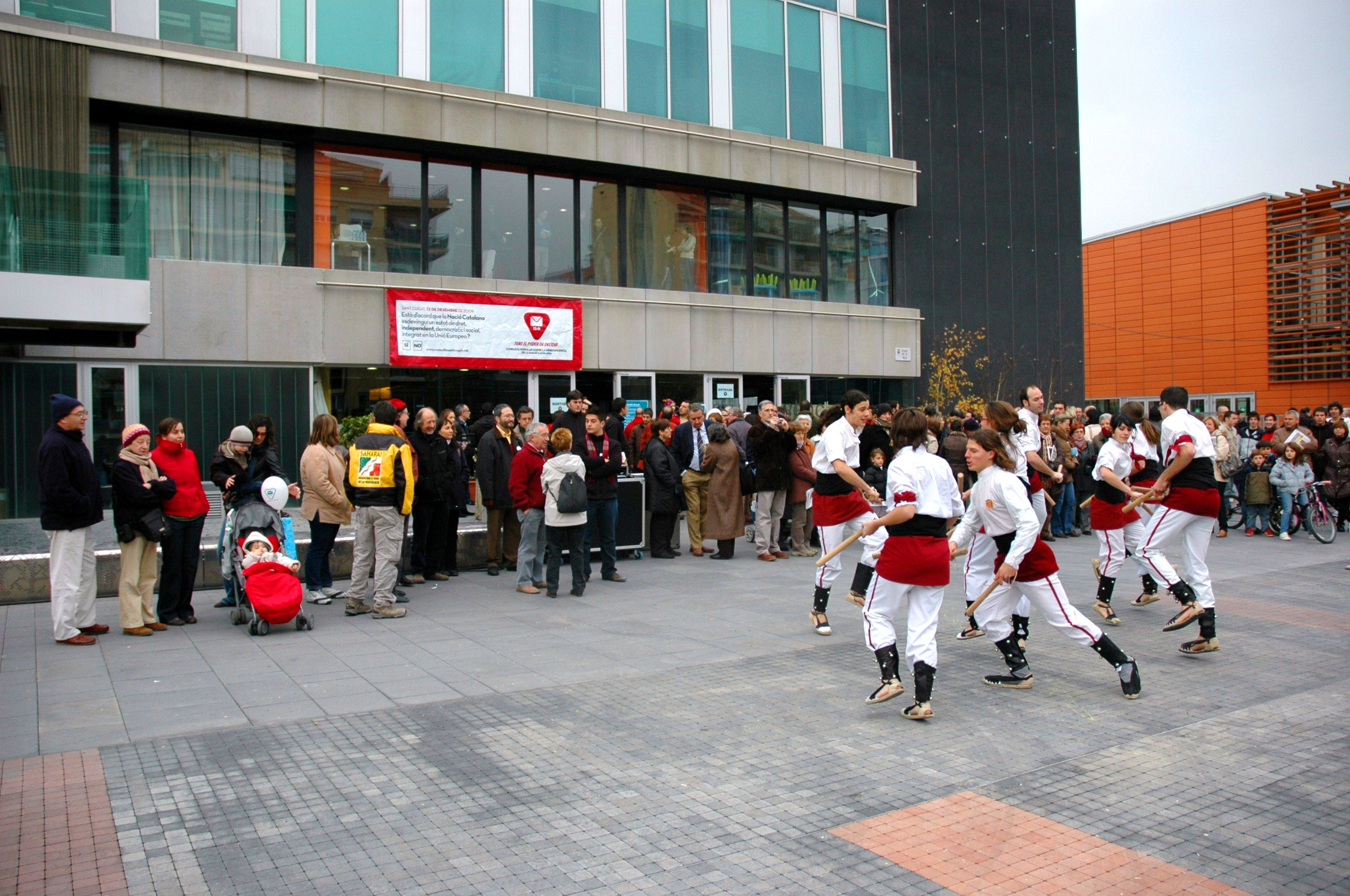
Queues to vote in the Club muntanyenc (Mountain Club) of Sant Cugat

On 12 December, a day before the rest, Sant Jaume de Frontanyà, one of the less populous municipalities in Catalonia with only 21 voters, began the round of queries on independence.

=== Results ===
Referendum results

Yes	No	Blank	Invalid

Municipality	Comarca	Census (+16)	Votes	Participation	p	%	p	%	p	%	p	%
Alcanó	Segrià	219	73	33.33 %	68	93.15 %	4	5.48 %	1	1.37 %	0	0 %
Alcarràs	Segrià	6.172	1.155	18.71 %	1.097	94.98 %	51	4.42 %	7	0.61 %	0	0%
Alfés	Segrià	296	127	42.91%	125	98.43%	2	1.57%	0	0%	0	0%
Almoster	Baix Camp	1.044	419	40.13%	382	91.17%	26	6.21%	10	2.39%	1	0.24%
Alpens	Osona	253	176	69.57%	174	98.86%	1	0.57%	0	0%	1	0.57%
Arbeca	Garrigues	2.207	580	28.61 %	551	95.00 %	14	2.41 %	15	2.59 %	0	0 %
Arbúcies	Selva	5.408	1.859	34.38 %	1.781	95.80 %	41	2.21 %	34	1.83 %	3	0.16 %
Arenys de Mar	Maresme	12.254	3.303	26.95%	3.173	96.06%	78	2.36%	51	1.54%	1	0.03%
Argelaguer	Garrotxa	353	191	54.11 %	177	92.67 %	6	3.14 %	8	4.19 %	0	0 %
Argentona	Maresme	9.383	2.507	26.72%	2.384	95.09%	74	2.95%	47	1.87%	2	0.08%
Artesa de Lleida	Segrià	1.257	400	31.82%	383	95.75%	7	1.75%	8	2.00%	2	0.50%
Artesa de Segre	Noguera	3.311	1.006	30.38%	937	93.14%	29	2.88%	36	3.58%	4	0.40%
Banyoles	Pla de l'Estany	14.563	4.688	32.19%	4.565	97.38%	51	1.09%	65	1.39%	7	0.15%
Berga	Berguedà	14.663	4.760	32.46%	4.616	96.97%	81	1.70%	34	0.71%	29	0.61%
Besalú	Garrotxa	1.961	809	41.25%	752	92.95%	21	2.60%	34	4.20%	2	0.25%
Beuda	Garrotxa	140	42	30.00%	38	90.48%	1	2.38%	3	7.14%	0	0%
Bolvir	Cerdanya	318	135	42.45 %	112	82.96 %	4	2.96 %	19	14.07 %	0	0 %
Bordils	Gironès	1.430	513	36.54 %	498	97.08 %	8	1.56 %	7	1.36 %	0	0 %
Calders	Bages	770	381	49.48%	353	92.65%	10	2.62%	17	4.46%	1	0.26%
Calldetenes	Osona	2.022	1.036	51.24%	1005	97.01%	22	2.12%	8	0.77%	1	0.1%
Callús	Bages	1.406	475	33.76%	448	94.32%	10	2.11%	5	1.05%	12	2.53%
Camós	Pla de l'Estany	602	238	39.53%	221	92.86%	14	5.88%	3	1.26%	0	0%
Campllong	Gironès	337	137	37.95%	128	93.43%	2	1.46%	7	5.11%	0	0%
Canet de Mar	Maresme	11.294	2932	25.96%	2727	93.01%	128	4.37%	73	2.49%	4	0.14%
Cardedeu	Vallès Oriental	13.021	3.464	26.60 %	3.174	91.63 %	192	5.54 %	60	1.73 %	38	1.10 %
Cassà de la Selva	Gironès	7.696	2.026	26.33%	1.922	94.87%	62	3.06%	39	1.92%	3	0.15%
Castellar del Riu	Berguedà	127	75	59.06%	69	92.00%	2	2.67%	4	5.33%	0	0.00%
Castellar del Vallès	Vallès Occidental	18.218	3.551	19.49%	3.372	94.96%	118	3.32%	58	1.63%	3	0.08%
Castellbell i el Vilar	Bages	3.064	542	17.69%	527	97.23%	12	2.21%	1	0.18%	2	0.37%
Castellbisbal	Vallès Occidental	9.280	1.566	16.88 %	1.421	90.74 %	103	6.58 %	36	2.30 %	6	0.38 %
Castellfollit de la Roca	Garrotxa	876	285	32.53%	270	94.74%	12	4.21%	3	1.05	0	0%
Celrà	Gironès	3.402	993	29.19 %	956	96.27 %	15	1.51 %	21	2.11 %	1	0.10 %
Centelles	Osona	6.164	1.978	32.09%	1.934	97.78%	35	1.77%	6	0.30%	3	0.15%
Cervià de les Garrigues	Garrigues	731	253	34.61%	241	95.26%	8	3.16%	4	1.58%	0	0%
Cervià de Ter	Gironès	699	337	48.21%	320	94.96%	4	1.19%	13	3.86%	0	0%
Clariana de Cardener	Solsonès	124	53	42.74 %	50	94.34 %	0	0 %	3	5.66 %	0	0 %
Collsuspina	Osona	287	178	62.02%	169	94.94%	7	3.93%	2	1.12%	0	0%
Constantí	Tarragonès	5.267	689	13.08%	619	89.84%	56	8.13%	11	1.60%	3	0.44%
Corbins	Segrià	1.167	357	30.59%	340	95.24%	7	1.96%	9	2.52%	1	0.28%
Cornellà del Terri	Pla de l'Estany	1.840	670	36.41 %	642	95.82%	11	1.64%	2	0.30%	15	2.24%
Crespià	Pla de l'Estany	222	72	32.43%	70	97.22%	2	2.78%	0	0%	0	0%
El Brull	Osona	203	128	63.05%	121	94.53%	2	1.56%	4	3.13%	1	0.78%
El Masnou	Maresme	18.592	3.975	21.38%	3.727	93.76%	163	4.10%	82	2.06%	3	0.08%
El Palau d'Anglesola	Pla d'Urgell	1.718	656	38.18%	610	92.99%	23	3.51%	19	2.90%	4	0.61%
El Papiol	Baix Llobregat	3.280	693	21.13 %	628	90.62 %	48	6.93 %	16	2.31 %	1	0.14 %
Els Hostalets de Pierola	Anoia	1.968	464	23.58 %	408	87.93 %	42	9.05 %	14	3.02 %	0	0 %
Els Prats de Rei	Anoia	477	210	44.03 %	194	92.38 %	8	3.81 %	6	3.81 %	2	0.95 %
Esponellà	Pla de l'Estany	375	163	43.47%	157	96.32%	2	1.23%	4	2.45%	0	0%
Flaçà	Gironès	905	317	35.03%	302	95.27%	8	2.52%	7	2.21%	0	0%
Folgueroles	Osona	1.713	968	56.51 %	954	98.55%	12	1.24%	2	0.21%	0	0%
Fontcoberta	Pla de l'Estany	996	468	46.99%	454	97.01%	5	1.07%	9	1.92%	0	0%
Fulleda	Garrigues	106	38	35.85%	35	92.11%	1	2.63%	2	5.26%	0	0%
Gallifa	Vallès Occidental	189	112	59.26 %	96	85.71 %	10	8.93 %	6	5.36 %	0	0 %
Golmés	Pla d'Urgell	1.425	348	24.42%	318	91.38%	11	3.16%	18	5.17%	1	0.29%
Gurb	Osona	2.026	944	46.59%	930	98.52%	10	1.06%	4	0.42%	0	0%
Ivars d'Urgell	Pla d'Urgell	1.528	671	43.91%	594	88.52%	37	5.51%	36	5.37%	4	0.6%
Jafre	Baix Empordà	366	227	62.02%	219	96.48%	2	0.88%	5	2.2%	1	$0.44
Juià	Gironès	247	826	28.78%	767	92.86%	20	2.42%	39	4.72%	0	0%
Juneda	Garrigues	3.074	826	28.78 %	767	92.86 %	20	2.42 %	39	4.72 %	0	0 %
L'Albi	Garrigues	739	266	35.99%	238	89.47%	8	3.01%	20	7.52%	0	0%
L'Arboç	Baix Penedès	4.374	1.015	23.21%	896	88.28%	106	10.44%	11	1.08%	2	0.2%
l'Estany	Bages	340	224	65.88%	191	85.27%	9	4.02%	23	10.27%	1	0.45%
La Cellera de Ter	Selva	1.802	803	44.56%	770	95.89%	18	2.24%	11	1.37%	4	0.5%
La Floresta	Garrigues	155	98	63.23%	91	92.86%	6	6.12%	1	1.02%	0	0%
La Granadella	Garrigues	692	217	31.36%	198	91.24%	9	4.15%	10	4.61%	0	0%
La Jonquera	Alt Empordà	2.602	547	21.02%	468	85.56%	55	10.05%	20	3.66%	4	0.73%
Vall de Boí	Alta Ribagorça	950	279	29.37%	262	93.91%	2	0.72%	15	5.38%	0	0%
Les Borges Blanques	Garrigues	5.156	1.580	30.64%	1.504	95.19%	37	2.34%	38	2.41%	1	0.06%
Les Franqueses del Vallès	Vallès Oriental	8.199	1.466	17.88 %	1.385	94.47 %	50	3.41 %	25	1.71 %	6	0.41 %
Les Masies de Roda	Osona	659	304	46.13%	294	96.71%	6	1.97%	3	0.99%	1	0.33%
Les Masies de Voltregà	Osona	2.645	955	36.11%	935	97.91%	12	1.26%	7	0.73%	1	0.1%
Les Piles	Conca de Barberà	198	70	35.35%	63	90%	4	5.71%	2	2.86%	1	1.43%
Les Planes d'Hostoles	Garrotxa	1.561	580	37.16%	545	93.97%	8	1.38%	23	3.97%	4	0.69%
Les Preses	Garrotxa	1.412	504	35.69%	478	94.84%	12	2.38%	14	2.78%	0	0%
Linyola	Pla d'Urgell	2.348	788	33.56%	737	93.53%	19	2.41%	29	3.68%	3	0.38%
Llagostera	Gironès	6.735	1.584	23.52 %	1.468	92.68 %	77	4.86 %	36	2.27 %	3	0.19 %
Llambilles	Gironès	541	244	45.10 %	240	98.36 %	0	0%	3	1.23 %	1	0.41 %
Llardecans	Segrià	474	176	37.13 %	155	88.07 %	15	8.52 %	6	3.41 %	0	0 %
Maià de Montcal	Garrotxa	347	139	40.64 %	122	87.77 %	8	5.76 %	8	5.76 %	1	0.72 %
Malla	Osona	229	147	64.19 %	142	96.60 %	2	1.36 %	3	2.04 %	-	-
Manlleu	Osona	16.746	5.018	29.97 %	4.783	95.32 %	178	3.55 %	57	1.14 %	-	-
Marganell	Bages	259	82	31.66 %	79	96.34 %	2	2.44 %	1	1.22 %	-	-
Maspujols	Baix Camp	463	224	48.38 %	208	92.86 %	13	5.80 %	3	1.34 %	0	0 %
Mieres	Garrotxa	287	106	36.93 %	98	92.45 %	2	1.89 %	6	5.66 %	0	0 %
Montagut i Oix	Garrotxa	806	272	33.75 %	256	94.12 %	4	1.47 %	12	4.41 %	0	0 %
Montbrió del Camp	Baix Camp	1.745	548	31.40 %	528	96.35 %	14	2.55 %	6	1.09 %	-	-
Montesquiu	Osona	778	382	49.10 %	362	94.76 %	14	3.66 %	4	1.05 %	2	0.52 %
Navàs	Bages	5.181	1.429	27.58 %	1.386	96.99 %	24	1.68 %	16	1.12 %	3	0.21 %
Olvan	Berguedà	805	308	38.26 %	296	96.10 %	10	3.25 %	1	0.32 %	1	0.32 %
Orís	Osona	252	139	55.16 %	136	97.84 %	2	1.44 %	1	0.72 %	-	-
Palau de Santa Eulàlia	Alt Empordà	96	53	55.21 %	47	88.68 %	4	7.55 %	2	3.77 %	-	-
Palol de Revardit	Pla de l'Estany	385	200	51.95 %	180	90.00 %	12	6.00 %	7	3.50 %	1	1.50 %
Pardines	Ripollès	143	66	46.15 %	66	100 %	0	0 %	0	0 %	0	0 %
Pau	Alt Empordà	498	120	24.10 %	109	90.83 %	8	6.67 %	2	1.67 %	1	0.83 %
Pedret i Marzà	Alt Empordà	141	51	36.17 %	46	90.20 %	2	3.92 %	3	5.88 %	-	-
Perafita	Osona	351	176	50.14 %	172	97.73 %	1	0.57 %	3	1.70 %	-	-
Pinell de Solsonès	Solsonès	80	79	98.75%	77	97.47%	0	0%	2	2.53%	0	0%
Planoles	Ripollès	254	98	38.58%	93	94.90%	3	3.06%	2	2.04%	0	0%
Ponts	Noguera	2.354	597	25.36%	573	95.98%	11	1.84%	13	2.18%	0	0%
Porqueres	Pla de l'Estany	3.533	1.335	37.79%	1.286	96.33%	25	1.87%	23	1.72%	1	0.07%
Prats de Lluçanès	Osona	2.367	930	39.29 %	912	98.06%	13	1.40%	5	0.54%	0	0%
Premià de Dalt	Maresme	8.107	1.596	19.69%	1.494	93.61%	61	3.82%	40	2.51%	1	0.06%
Premià de Mar	Maresme	23.038	3.557	15.44%	3.341	93.93%	117	3.29%	66	1.86%	33	0.93%
Puig-reig	Berguedà	3.806	1.130	29.69 %	1.098	97.17 %	18	1.59 %	13	1.15 %	1	0.09 %
Ribes de Freser	Ripollès	1.807	633	35.03%	617	97.47%	4	0.63%	11	1.74%	1	0.16%
Ridaura	Garrotxa	376	192	51.06%	191	99.48%	0	0%	1	0.52%	0	0%
Ripoll	Ripollès	9.574	2.346	24.50%	2.243	95.61%	73	3.11%	27	1.15%	3	0.13%
Roda de Ter	Osona	5.099	1.982	38.87 %	1.922	96.97 %	43	2.17 %	16	0.81 %	1	0.05 %
Roses	Alt Empordà	16.075	1.678	10.44%	1.527	91.00%	119	7.09%	30	1.79%	2	0.12%
Sallent	Bages	6.116	1.680	27.47%	1.535	91.37%	92	5.48%	2.92%	4	0.24%	
Sant Aniol de Finestres	Garrotxa	267	132	49.44 %	127	96.21 %	2	1.52 %	3	2.27 %	-	-
Sant Antoni de Vilamajor	Vallès Oriental	4.437	1.149	25.90 %	1.102	95.91 %	24	2.09 %	15	1.31 %	8	0.70 %
Sant Celoni	Vallès Oriental	13.765	2.998	21.78%	2.847	94.96%	120	4.00%	29	0.97%	2	0.07%
Sant Cugat del Vallès	Vallès Occidental	59.063	15.163	25.67%	14.002	92.34%	805	5.31%	170	1.12%	186	1.23%
Sant Esteve de Palautordera	Vallès Oriental	1.815	837	46.12 %	805	96.18 %	15	1.79 %	17	2.03 %	0	0.00 %
Sant Ferriol	Garrotxa	174	38	21.84 %	35	92.11 %	2	5.26 %	1	2.63 %	-	-
Sant Gregori	Gironès	2.498	886	35.47 %	857	96.73 %	17	1.92 %	12	1.35 %	-	-
Sant Hilari Sacalm	Selva	4.920	1.566	31.83 %	1.516	96.81 %	22	1.40 %	26	1.66 %	2	0.13 %
Sant Hipòlit de Voltregà	Osona	2.935	1.095	37.31 %	1.071	97.81 %	20	1.83 %	3	0.27 %	1	0.09 %
Sant Jaume de Frontanyà	Berguedà	21	19	90.41%	18	94.7%	1	5.3%	0	0%	0	0%
Sant Jaume de Llierca	Garrotxa	699	313	44.78 %	290	92.65 %	9	2.88 %	13	4.15 %	1	0.32 %
Sant Jordi Desvalls	Gironès	545	273	50.09 %	270	98.90 %	0	0 %	3	1.10 %	0	0 %
Sant Julià de Vilatorta	Osona	2.386	1.307	54.78 %	1.291	98.78 %	11	0.84 %	5	0.38 %	-	-
Sant Miquel de Campmajor	Pla de l'Estany	208	83	39.90 %	79	95.18 %	1	1.20 %	3	3.61 %	-	-
Sant Pere de Torelló	Osona	2.073	1.135	54.75 %	1.087	95.77 %	29	2.56 %	18	1.59 %	1	0.09 %
Sant Pere de Vilamajor	Vallès Oriental	3.098	842	27.18 %	768	91.21 %	49	5.82 %	23	2.73 %	2	0.24 %
Sant Pol de Mar	Maresme	4.330	1.377	31.80 %	1.325	96.22 %	33	2.40 %	19	1.38 %	0	0 %
Sant Quirze de Besora	Osona	1.949	811	41.61 %	777	95.81 %	31	3.82 %	3	0.37 %	-	-
Sant Salvador de Guardiola	Bages	2.446	462	18.89 %	442	95.67 %	10	2.16 %	7	1.52 %	3	0.65 %
Sant Vicenç de Torelló	Osona	1.684	741	44.00 %	694	93.66 %	9	1.21 %	3	0.40 %	35	4.72 %
Santa Cecília de Voltregà	Osona	159	79	49.69 %	78	98.73 %	1	1.27 %	-	-	-	-
Santa Coloma de Farners	Selva	10.432	2.385	22.86 %	2.291	96.06 %	58	2.43 %	30	1.26 %	6	0.25 %
Santa Eugènia de Berga	Osona	1.660	925	55.72 %	910	98.38 %	15	1.62 %	-	-	-	-
Santa Eulàlia de Riuprimer	Osona	895	577	64.47 %	558	96.71 %	12	2.08 %	7	1.21 %	0	0 %
Santa Eulàlia de Ronçana	Vallès Oriental	5.467	1.070	19.57 %	998	93.27 %	46	4.30 %	25	2.34 %	1	0.09 %
Santa Maria de Besora	Osona	153	96	62.75 %	89	92.71 %	5	5.21 %	1	1.04 %	1	1.04 %
Santa Maria de Corcó	Osona	1.902	1066	56.05 %	1.049	98.41 %	7	0.66 %	10	0.94 %	-	-
Santa Pau	Garrotxa	1.379	562	40.87 %	534	95.02 %	11	1.96 %	16	2.85 %	1	0.18 %
Sentmenat	Vallès Occidental	6.209	1.273	20.50 %	1.210	95.05 %	39	3.06 %	21	1.65 %	3	0.24 %
Serinyà	Pla de l'Estany	914	347	37.96 %	327	94.24 %	9	2.59 %	11	3.17 %	-	-
Seva	Osona	2.788	1.197	42.93 %	1.160	96.91 %	27	2.26 %	10	0.84 %	-	-
Sils	Selva	3.962	823	20.77 %	765	92.95 %	45	5.47 %	12	1.46 %	1	0.12 %
Solsona	Solsonès	7.794	2.079	26.67 %	1.977	95.09 %	50	2.41 %	47	2.26 %	5	0.24 %
Sora	Osona	168	116	69.05 %	109	93.97 %	3	2.59 %	4	3.45 %	-	-
Sunyer	Segrià	276	121	43.84 %	106	87.60 %	9	7.44 %	6	4.96 %	0	0 %
Taradell	Osona	5.077	2.608	51.37 %	2.547	97.66 %	42	1.61 %	12	0.46 %	7	0.27 %
Tàrrega	Urgell	13.340	2.862	21.45 %	2.690	93.99 %	104	3.63 %	67	2.34 %	1	0.03 %
Tavèrnoles	Osona	260	128	49.23%	120	93.75%	6	4.69%	2	1.56%	0	0%
Tiana	Maresme	6.049	1.593	26.33%	1.496	93.91%	69	4.33%	27	1.69%	1	0.06%
Tona	Osona	6.544	2.627	40.14%	2.489	94.75%	99	3.77%	34	1.29%	5	0.19%
Torelló	Osona	11.605	4.024	34.67%	3.868	96.12%	81	2.01%	40	0.99%	35	0.87%
Torrebesses	Segrià	272	124	45.59 %	106	85.48 %	6	4.84 %	11	8.87 %	1	0.81 %
Torroella de Montgrí	Baix Empordà	9.651	2.172	22.51%	2.055	94.61%	66	3.04%	32	1.47%	19	0.87%
Tortellà	Garrotxa	658	205	31.16%	191	93.17%	1	0.49%	9	4.39%	4	1.95%
Toses	Ripollès	129	51	39.53%	51	100%	0	0%	0	0%	0	0%
Ullastrell	Vallès Occidental	1.392	539	38.72 %	515	95.55 %	13	2.41 %	7	1.30 %	4	0.74 %
Vall de Boí	Alta Ribagorça	962	279	29.37 %	262	93.91 %	2	0.72 %	15	5.38 %	0	0 %
Vallfogona de Ripollès	Ripollès	196	102	52.04%	95	93.14%	3	2.94%	4	3.92%	0	0%
Verges	Baix Empordà	1.030	496	48.16 %	456	91.94 %	20	4.03 %	20	4.03 %	0	0 %
Vic	Osona	33.175	14.084	42.45%	13.783	97.86%	209	1.48%	78	0.55%	14	0.10%
Vidrà	Osona	146	93	63.70%	87	93.55%	2	2.15%	4	4.30%	0	0%
Viladamat	Alt Empordà	380	196	51.58%	190	96.94%	3	1.53%	3	1.53%	0	0%
Vilademuls	Pla de l'Estany	677	245	36.19%	237	96.73%	1	0.41%	7	2.86%	0	0%
Viladrau	Osona	930	443	47.63%	422	95.26%	16	3.61%	5	1.13%	0	0%
Vilafranca del Penedès	Alt Penedès	32.200	7.117	22.10%	6.720	94.42%	296	4.16%	70	0.98%	31	0.44%
Vilajuïga	Alt Empordà	909	284	31.24 %	263	92.61 %	11	3.87 %	10	3.52 %	0	0%
Vilanova i la Geltrú	Garraf	54.322	8.518	15.68 %	7.918	92.96 %	416	4.88 %	106	1.24 %	78	0.92 %
Vilassar de Dalt	Maresme	7.211	2.224	30.84 %	2.130	95.77 %	49	2.20 %	45	2.02 %	0	0 %
	TOTAL	702.072	192.460	27.41 %	182.625	94.89 %	6.186	3.21 %	2.958	1.54 %	691	0.36 %

=== Press reactions ===
==== Austria ====
- The vote on the independence of Catalonia - Kleine Zeitung

==== France ====
- The Catalan nationalists organize a "referendum" - Le Monde
- "Le mal catalan" (Editorial) - Le Monde

==== Germany ====
- No legal value, but politically explosive - Tagesschau.de

==== Italy ====
- Catalonia, revolution by football - Il Giornale

==== Slovenia ====
- Catalonia holds referendum on the regions's independence - Delo

==== United Kingdom ====
- Catalonia votes on independence from Spain
- Referendum fever spreads as Barcelona holds Catalan secession poll

== Barcelona poll, April 2011 ==
The April 10, 2011 poll in Barcelona had a 21% turnout with 9 out of 10 of those showing up to the unofficial poll favoring independence.

== Institutional support ==
The queries on the independence of Catalonia have been carried out by civil society and the implications of public institutions for their organizations are persecuted by the Spanish State. But several city councils and comarcal councils have approved motions in favor of this referendum to be called a civil organization, supporting them in this way without violating the laws.

=== Comarcal councils ===
Comarcal councils for the referendums Comarcal councils against the referendums

Five comarcal councils have spoken in favor and one against, covering a population of 630,000 and 10,000 respectively.

== See also ==
- Catalan separatism
- Independence referendum
