= Dolors Terradas =

Spanish politician (born 1949)

Member of the Congress of Deputies
- In office 4 January 2016 – 3 May 2016
- Constituency: Girona

Municipal Councillor of Banyoles
- In office 24 May 1983 – 9 June 1987

Personal details
- Born: Dolors Terradas i Viñals; 24 February 1949 (age 77) Cornellà del Terri, Spain
- Party: Unified Socialist Party of Catalonia (1971–1988); Republican Left of Catalonia; En Comú Podem
- Education: University of Girona
- Occupation: Teacher, politician

Dolors Terradas i Viñals (born 24 February 1949) is a Spanish teacher and politician, a member of the Congress of Deputies during the 11th Legislature.

== Biography ==
Dolors Terradas earned a licentiate in history from the University of Girona. She worked as a teacher of Compulsory Secondary Education (ESO) geography and history at several vocational training centers, as well as baccalaureate programs. She also performed studies on demography in Pla de l'Estany, some of which she published in the Revista de Girona.

In 1971 she became politically active in the Unified Socialist Party of Catalonia (PSUC), and was victorious as their candidate for the Banyoles municipal council in the 1983 local elections. In 1988 she left the PSUC, and in the 1999 elections she occupied the symbolic 17th place in the Republican Left of Catalonia (ERC) list for the municipality of Banyoles. In 1996 she was the leader of the Banyoles festival.

Since 1994, she has participated in the social movement Banyoles Solidària, where she deals with the legalization and literacy of immigrants and cooperates with The Gambia and other countries in the process of economic development. In the 2015 general election she won a seat in the Congress of Deputies as head of the En Comú Podem list for Girona. She served on the Interior Commission, and was second vice president of the Commission of International Cooperation for Development.

== Publications ==
- Sobre la divisió territorial de Catalunya i el cas polèmic de Banyoles (1976)
- Població i societat a Banyoles al segle XVIII (1981)
- Les epidèmies de còlera a Banyoles en el segle XIX (1982), published in the Revista de Girona
- La Població de Banyoles al s. XVIII (1983)
- Aproximació a un exemple d'industrialització no reeixit: Banyoles 1700–1900 (1985)
