= Catalan independence referendum =

There have been several Catalan independence referendums for determining the independence of Catalonia from Spain.

- 2017 Catalan independence referendum
  - Declaration of the Initiation of the Process of Independence of Catalonia
  - Law on the Referendum on Self-determination of Catalonia
- 2014 Catalan self-determination referendum
- Catalan independence referendums, 2009–11
  - Catalan independence referendum, 2009 (Arenys de Munt)

== See also ==
- 2012 Catalan independence demonstration
- Catalan independence
- Catalan Republic
