= Factoria d'Arts Escèniques (Banyoles) =

Coordinates: 42°6′32″N 2°46′31″E

Factoria d’Arts Escèniques is a cultural building focused in teaching, producing and playing performing arts. It is located in Baldiri Reixach, 403 de Banyoles, Pla de l'Estany. The building received the official visit of the Minister of Culture, González-Sinde in October 2010 and inaugurated its first play the 27 March 2011 but it wasn't officially opened since 20 April 2011.

== Aula de Teatre ==
Aula de Teatre is a teaching centre promoted by the Culture Area of Ajuntament de Banyoles. Factoria d'Arts Escèniques is its venue since 2011. Several theatre companies have emerged from Aula de Teatre such as Cor de Teatre, Pocapuc Teatre, Kafkiana and El Vol del Pollastre.
