= El Vol del Pollastre =

Performing arts company based in Banyoles, Pla de l'Estany, Spain

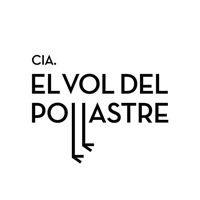
Logo of the company

El Vol del Pollastre is a performing arts company based in Banyoles, Pla de l'Estany, founded in December 2009. They have been responsible for the promotion of Banyoles carnival in the years 2010, 2011, 2012 and 2013, the fourth edition of Fira del Món del Foc held in Banyoles in 2014, as well as other small performances linked with cultural events in the city of Banyoles.

== Stage plays ==
In 2011 they debuted with their first full theatre performance in Teatre Municipal de Banyoles. Júlia?, with Clàudia Cedó as a director, is an original play inspired in 1984 by George Orwell that they define as a tragicomedy about social networks. In 2013 they released De petits tots matàvem formigues (We all used to kill ants when we were kids) again directed by Clàudia Cedó, in Factoria d'Arts Escèniques. This second work, also an original, is a western with a touch of Film noir. Both works have also been played in Girona: Júlia? in Centre Cultural la Mercè and De petits tots matàvem formigues in Sala La Planeta.

== Awards ==
- First prize (Catalunya) for De petits tots matàvem formigues. 11th Premios Buero de Teatro Joven. 2014.
- Best set design (Catalunya) for De petits tots matàvem formigues. 11th Premios Buero de Teatro Joven. 2014.
