= Salvador Oliva i Llinàs =

Spanish poet, philologist and professor

Salvador Oliva i Llinàs (1942-12-06, Banyoles, Pla de l'Estany) is a translator, poet, and retired university professor. He received a licentiate in romance philology and a doctorate in Catalan philology from the University of Barcelona. He was a professor at the University of Girona for forty years until, in 2013, he retired as the Chair of Catalan Philology.

In addition to the complete dramatic and poetic work of William Shakespeare, which he began when creating subtitles for BBC broadcasts, he has translated into Catalan work by W. H. Auden, Dylan Thomas, Oscar Wilde, R. L. Stevenson, Washington Irving and Jean-Claude Grumberg and Lewis Carroll's Alice in Wonderland.

== Publications ==
=== Essays and books ===
- Mètrica catalana (1981)
- Introducció a la mètrica (1986, reprinted in 2008 with the title Nova introducció a la mètrica)
- La mètrica i el ritme de la prosa (1992)
- Introducció a Shakespeare (2001)
- Tractat d'elocució (2006)
- Poesia i veritat (2015)
- La rehumanización del arte (2015)
- Epístoles a Josep Carner (2018)

=== Poetry ===
- Marees del desig (1975)
- Terres perdudes (1981)
- El somriure del tigre (1986)
- Retalls de sastre (1988)
- Fugitius (1994)
- Complements circumstancials (1998)
