= Arenys de Munt =

- Municipality
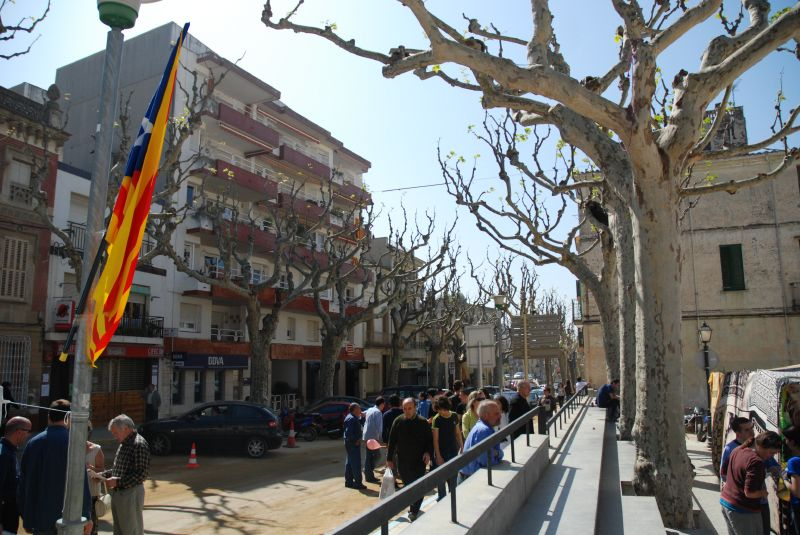

- Coat of arms

- Location in Catalonia Arenys de Munt (Spain)
- Coordinates: 41.610°N 2.540°E
- Country: Spain
- Community: Catalonia
- Province: Barcelona
- Comarca: Maresme

Government
  - Mayor: Joan Rabasseda Ferrer (2015)

Area
  - Total: 21.3 km^{2} (8.2 sq mi)
- Elevation: 121 m (397 ft)

Population (2025-01-01)
  - Total: 9,558
  - Density: 449/km^{2} (1,160/sq mi)
- Demonyms: Arenyenc, arenyenca
- Website: arenysdemunt.cat

Arenys de Munt (Catalan: [əˈɾɛɲz ðə ˈmun], locally [əˈɾɛɲʒ ðə ˈmun]; arenys being Catalan for "sands (of a seasonal creek)", and de munt for "up hill" as opposed to Arenys de Mar, "sands by the sea") is a municipality in the comarca of the Maresme in Catalonia, Spain. It is situated inland from the coast, in the el Corredor range and including the peak of el Montalt (595 m). It retains a textile industry specialised in the production of towels, and is also known for the production of strawberries, cherries and liqueurs. The B-511 road links the town with Arenys de Mar, Vallgorguina and Sant Celoni.

It is also the hometown of actor Daniel Brühl.

== Politics ==
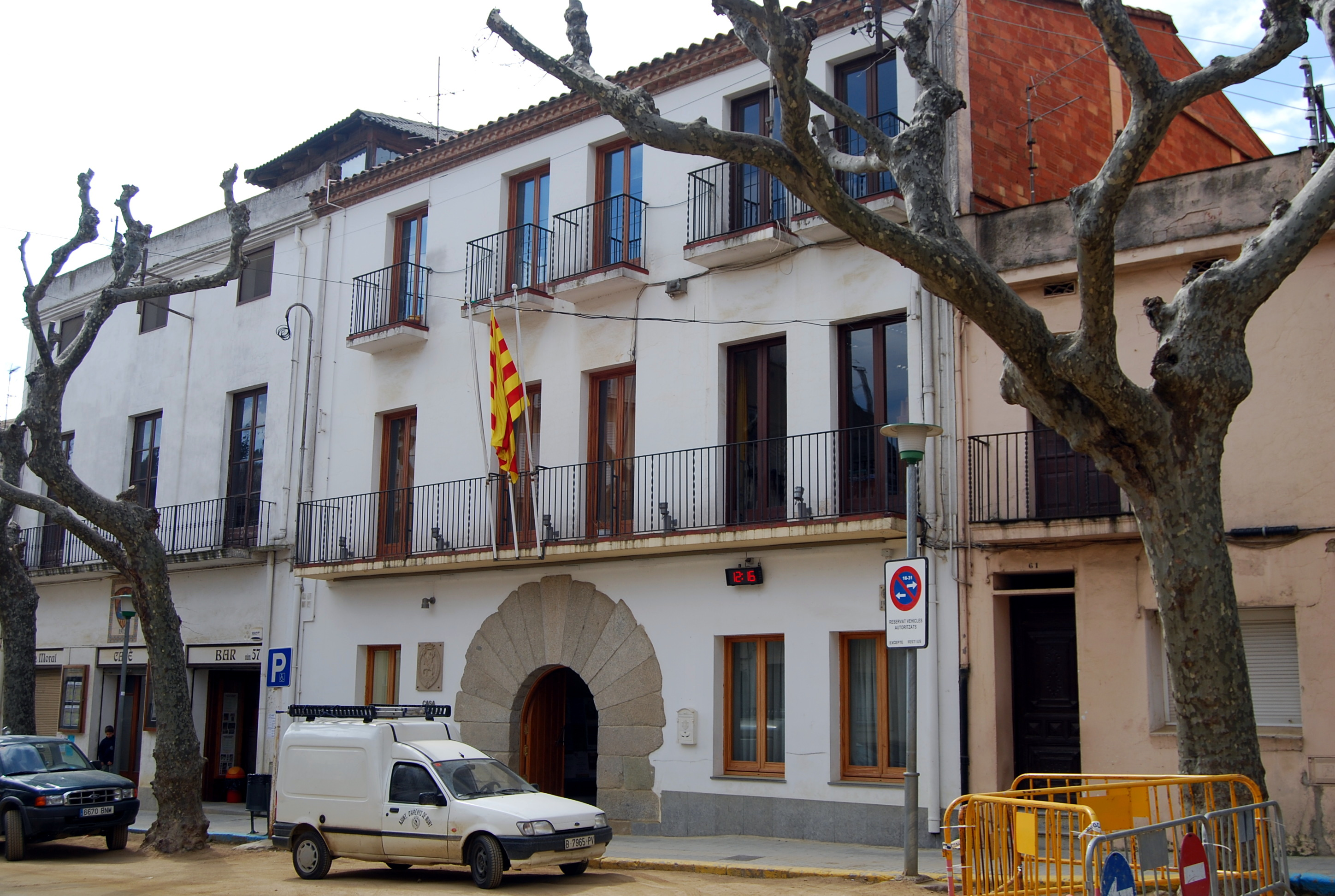
City Hall

On September 13, 2009, the municipality held a symbolic referendum (with no legal status under the Spanish Constitution) on self-determination and independence for Catalonia. The participation rate was 41% (33% of the town's entire population, including those under the voting age). Over 96% of participating voters cast ballots in favour of independence. The referendum gave momentum to a movement for similar consultations to be held in other municipalities across Catalonia, including a co-ordinated vote in multiple municipalities, which was held a week later, on December 13.

== Demography ==
| 1900 | 1930 | 1950 | 1970 | 1986 | 2007 |
|---|---|---|---|---|---|
| 3003 | 3232 | 3066 | 4023 | 4654 | 7807 |

== See also ==
- Arenys de Munt query on Catalonia independence

== Bibliography ==
- Panareda Clopés, Josep Maria; Rios Calvet, Jaume; Rabella Vives, Josep Maria (1989). Guia de Catalunya, Barcelona: Caixa de Catalunya. ISBN 84-87135-01-3 (Spanish). ISBN 84-87135-02-1 (Catalan).
