= Vilamarí =

- Village
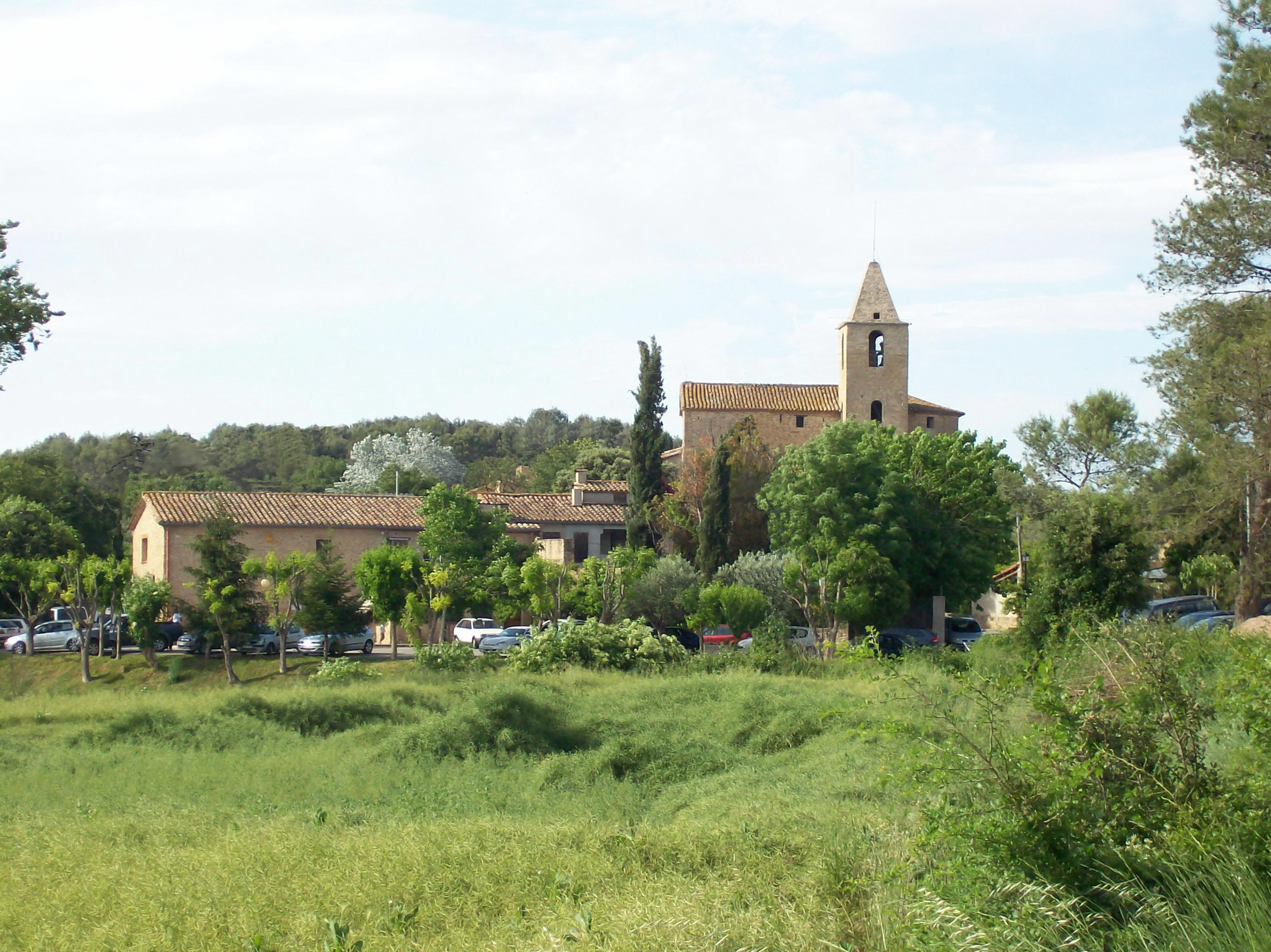

- Location in Catalonia
- Coordinates: 42°06′45″N 2°51′07″E
- Country: Spain
- Community: Catalonia
- Province: Girona
- Municipality: Vilademuls

Population (2012)
  - Total: 91
- Time zone: UTC+1 (CET)
  - Summer (DST): UTC+2 (CEST)
- Postal code: 17468
- Website: Vilademuls.cat - Vilamarí

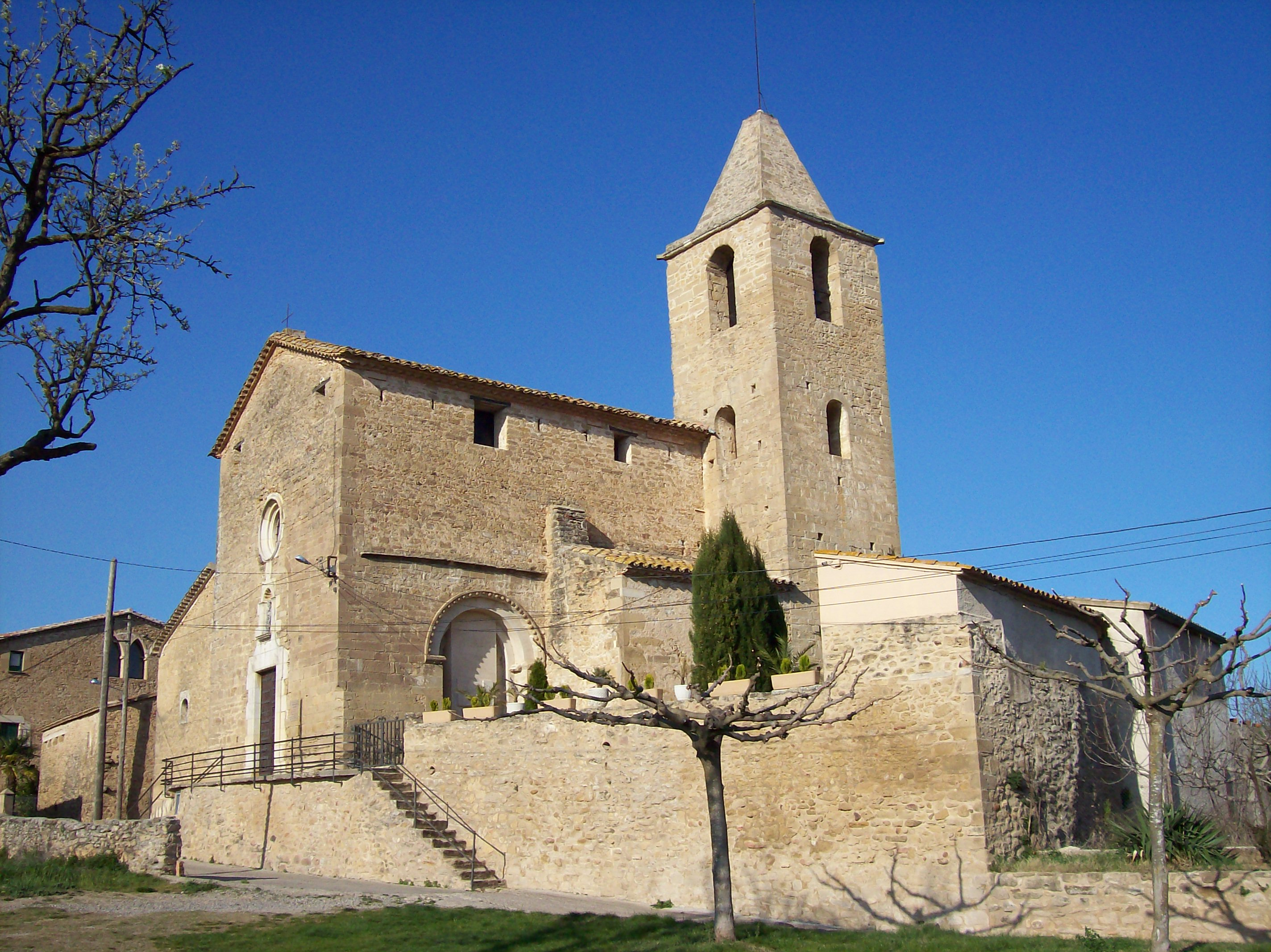
Saint Mary of Vilamarí

Vilamarí is a village in the province of Girona and autonomous community of Catalonia, Spain.

== See also ==
- Agustí Riera i Pau
