= 2009 Catalan independence referendum in Arenys de Munt =

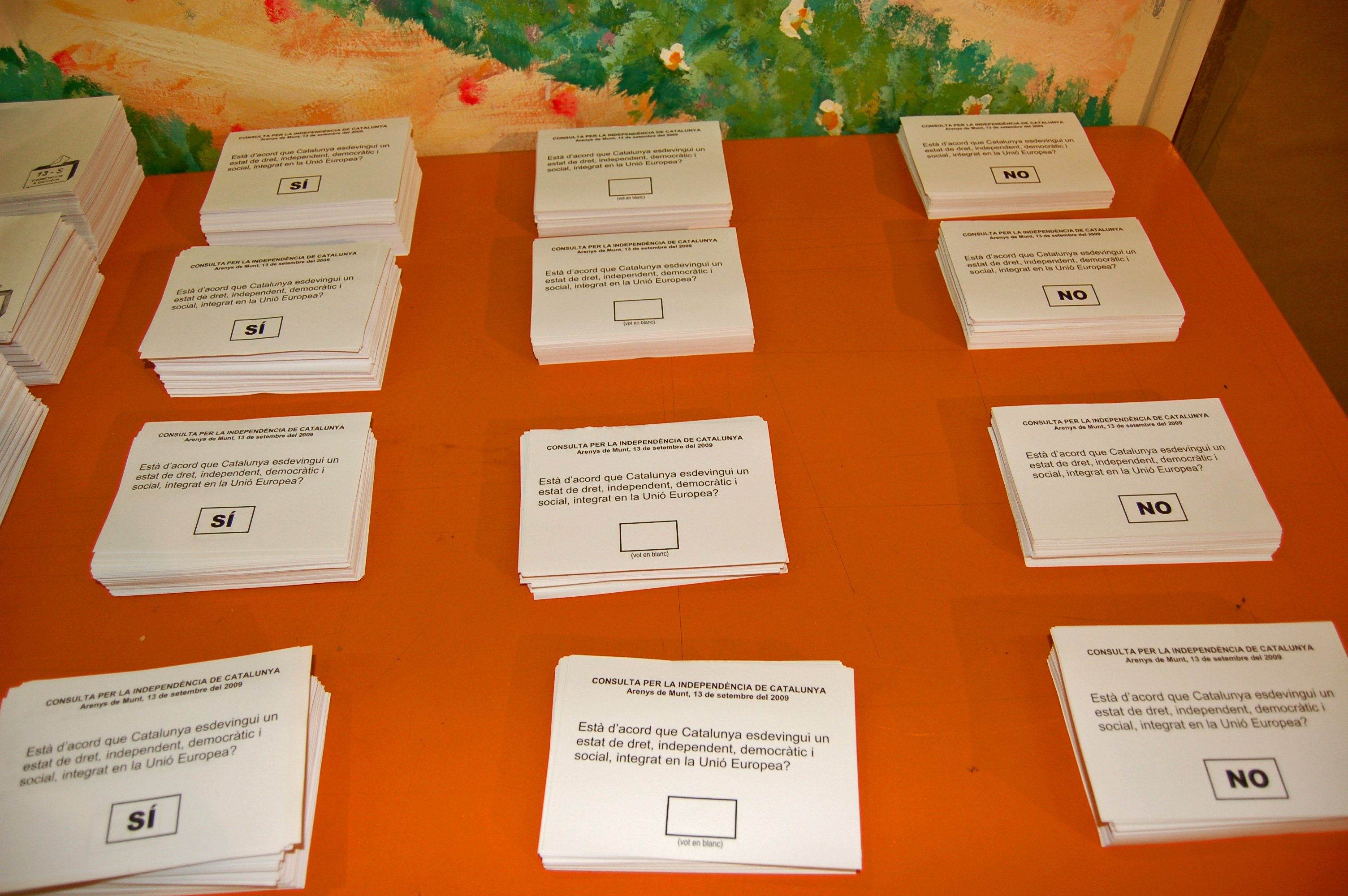
Voting ballots used in the referendum.

The Arenys de Munt query on Catalonia independence was a municipal non-binding query promoted by the Moviment Arenyenc per l'Autodeterminació (Arenyenc Movement for Self-determination) held in Arenys de Munt on 13 September 2009. The query was formulated exclusively for residents of this village on the following question: Està d'acord que Catalunya esdevingui un Estat de dret, independent, democràtic i social, integrat a la Unió Europea? (Do you agree on Catalonia becoming an independent, democratic and social State of law, integrated in the European Union?).

This query was the first democratic one on Catalonia independence and, despite being municipal and symbolic, had a remarkable influence on Catalan and Spanish politics.

== Results ==
Independence query on 13 September 2009
Voting options	Votes	Percentage
Yes	2.569	96,2%
No	61	2,3%
Blank ballots	29	1,1%
Valid ballots	2.659	99,6%
Void ballots	12	0,4%
Total ballots	2.671	100%
Participation	41.0%	
Voters	6.517	
Sources: Llibertat.cat, 3cat24.cat

== Reactions in the media ==
The query had wide media coverage all around the world and more than 300 journalists were granted to cover it by the organizers.

- The New York Times (United States): Catalan Town Votes For Independence From Spain
- France Press (France): Espagne: vote massif pour l'indépendance catalane lors d'un référendum symbolique
- Le Monde (France): La Catalogne se mobilise pour défendre son statut d'autonomie élargie
- Ouest France (France): Une commune de Catalogne vote pour l'indépendance de la région
- Nouvel Observateur (France): Vote massif en faveur de l'indépendance de la Catalogne
- France24 (France): Espagne: référendum local controversé sur l'autodétermination catalane
- n-TV (Germany): Katalanischer Ort gegen Spanien
- Der Standard (Austria): Katalanische Gemeinde stimmte über Unabhängigkeit ab
- CNN Türk (Turkey): Katalonya'nın bağımsızlığına referandum!
- Milliyet (Turkey): Barcelona'da Katalonya için bağımsızlık gösterisi...
- Expresso (Portugal): Espanha/Catalunha: Maioria de votantes em Arenys de Munt apoia independência em referendo com 41% de participação
- NOS (Netherlands): Catalaans dorp wil los van Spanje
- El Mundo (Spain): Sí masivo en la consulta independentista, que tuvo un 41% de participación
- STV (Great Britain): Catalan town votes for independence from Spain
- ORF (Austria): Katalanisches Dorf stimmt für die Unabhängigkeit
- 7sur7 (Belgium): Référendum polémique sur l'autodétermination de la Catalogne
- El Universal (Venezuela): Realizan en España consulta no vinculante por la independencia de Cataluña
- Euronews (Europe): Catalan town votes for independence
- El País (Spain): Convergència y ERC llaman an extender el alarde soberanista de Arenys
- De Morgen (Flandes): Catalaanse gemeente stemt over onafhankelijkheid

== See also ==
- Catalan separatism
- Independence referendum
- Query on Catalonia independence
- Institut Nova Història
