= Banyoles monster =

Legendary monster from Lake of Banyoles

The Banyoles monster is a legendary monster, possibly a dragon, from the Lake of Banyoles in Catalonia.

== Legend ==
According to the legend, the Banyoles monster lives in the Banyoles Lake in Girona of northern eastern Spain hundreds of years ago. In the eighth century, a French monk named St. Emeterio coaxed the beast from the lake using prayers and transformed the creature into a peaceful herbivore. It is said the Banyoles Monster still lives in the depth of the lake today.

== In popular culture ==
The monster is the subject of a 2008 children's song "El Monstre De Banyoles" by Toni Jiménez.
