= Alba Guibert =

Catalan scribe (11th century)

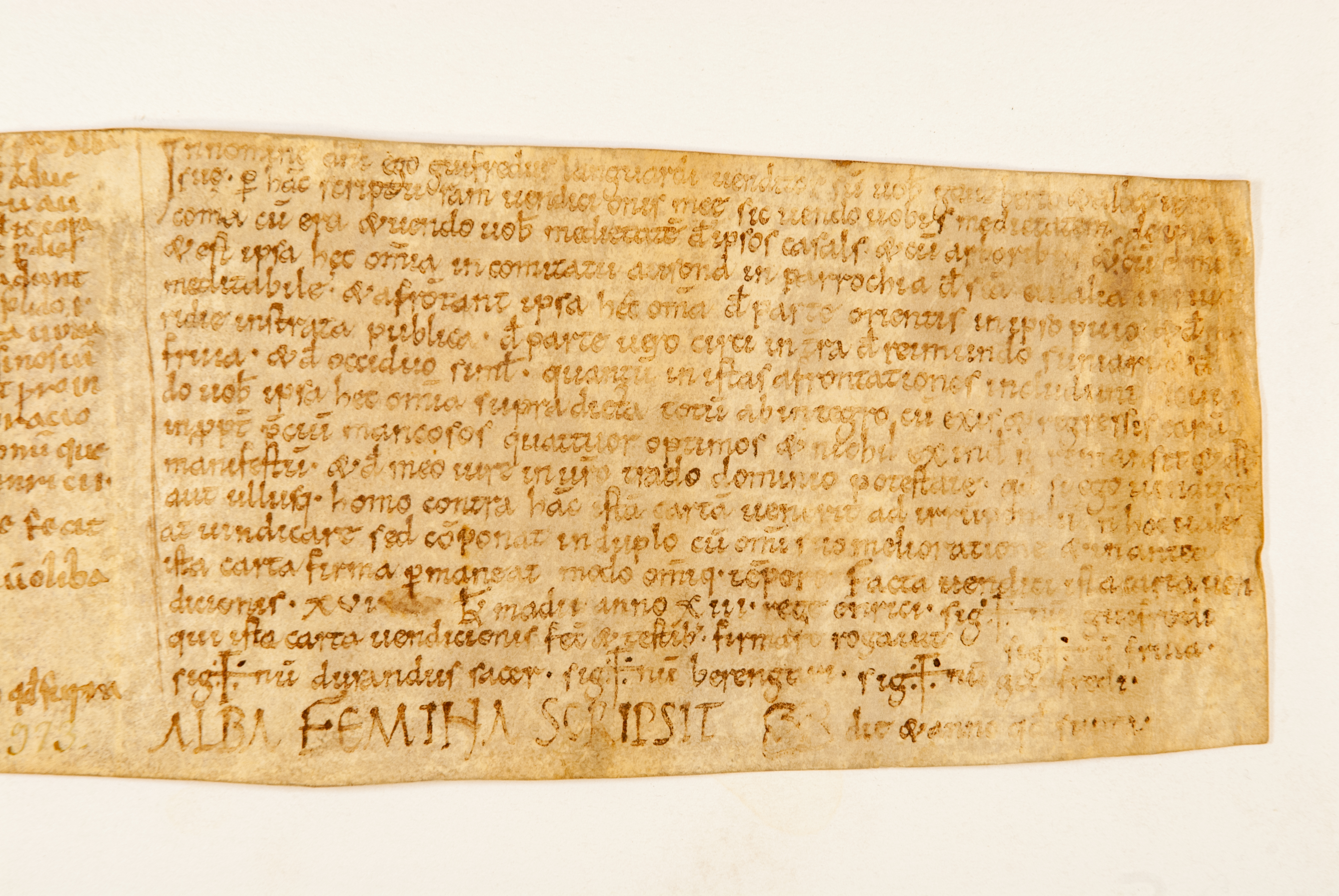
Deed of sale drawn up by Alba Guibert of Vic in the year 1044, held at the Episcopal Archive and Library of Vic

Alba Guibert, also known as Alba de Vic (11th century) was a Catalan scribe based in Vic, Kingdom of Aragon, whose deed of sale dating from 1044 is reported to be the first legal document written by a woman in Catalonia, containing earliest examples of a proto-Catalan language.

== Career ==
She is thought to have been born around the year 1010 into a large, educated family, and as the daughter of Guibert, a grammarian from Liège, in what is now Belgium, and Guilla. His father educated his six children in the humanities, and he went on to become headmaster of the grammar school at Vic Cathedral.

Based in Vic, Alba Guibert wrote and signed, in her own right, a document relating to a purchase she made with her husband, dated 16 April 1044. This document, written in Latin in Carolingian script, is signed with splendid capital letters of the librarian type. It is considered the first legal document written by a woman in Catalonia and features some of the earliest known uses of words in the Catalan language.

She lived in the village of Santa Eulàlia de Riuprimer. Her brother Berill drew up the will of Alba's husband, Jobert, as she was ill when he died in February 1063.
