= Agustí Riera i Pau =

Spanish physician (1876–1936)

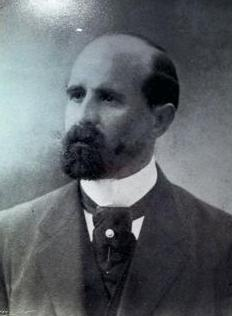
- Portrait of Agustí Riera i Pau
- Born: July 2, 1876; Captaincy General of Cuba
- Died: August 27, 1936 (aged 60); Les Encies, Francoist Spain
- Occupations: Politician, physician

Signature
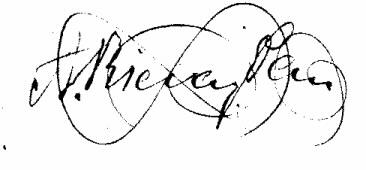

Agustí Riera i Pau (July 2, 1876 – August 27, 1936) was a conservative Catalan politician and physician.

== Biography ==
Agustí was the second child of the doctor Narciso Riera Isla, from Vilamarí (Pla de l'Estany) and Crescencia Pau Caulas of Besalu (Garrotxa). His parents emigrated temporarily to Cuba to flee the Third Carlist War. When they returned to Catalonia, Agustí was 8 years old. He had three sisters and two brothers.

Agustí attended primary school at El Collell high school and later at the Institute of Girona, where he met Francesc Cambó, starting a friendship that would last a lifetime. Both were part of the Regionalist League since its founding. He studied medicine at the University of Barcelona, where he graduated on May 30, 1899, with the highest award. In 1903 he married Maria Teresa Trotcha Estalella, the Cuban-born daughter of Zenon Trotcha, a former banker from Arenys de Mar, who also emigrated to Cuba. They lived in Barcelona until 1905, when due to the death of his father they moved to Sarria de Ter to take over his father's post as a physician. They had seven children.

Agustí was a member of the Association of Physicians and Biologists in Catalan Language, where he served as deputy member representing the surrounding region. He was elected the deputy provincial leader of Girona for the Regionalist League, and between March 13, 1911, and January 13, 1924, he was president of the Council of Girona. As such, he participated in the creation of the Commonwealth of Catalonia, a body composed of the four Catalan provinces, active between 1914 and 1925. He was appointed director of the Association of Communications and Public Works, position in which he performed effectively, expanding the area's infrastructure. He helped improve the country and local road meshwork and extended the telephone line network. He also took part, together with his friend Francesc Cambó, in the commission of the Catalan parliament in Madrid, created in 1918.

On January 9, 1921, he chaired the Floral Games in Sarrià de Ter. On May 13, 1923, he was elected senator for the province of Barcelona. In 1933, as chairman of Catalanist Center, was named vice president of the Governing Council of the Catalan League.

With the outbreak of the Spanish Civil War (July 18, 1936) he was threatened with death. Cambó offered him the possibility of exile — an offer taken up by many other politicians — but he declined. On August 27, 1936, he was found murdered in a small forest near Les Encies (Olot).

== Legacy ==
Two streets bear his name in Girona (in the Pont Major) and Sarria de Ter.
