= Lake of Banyoles =

Lake in Catalonia, Spain

Lake of Banyoles Estany de Banyoles
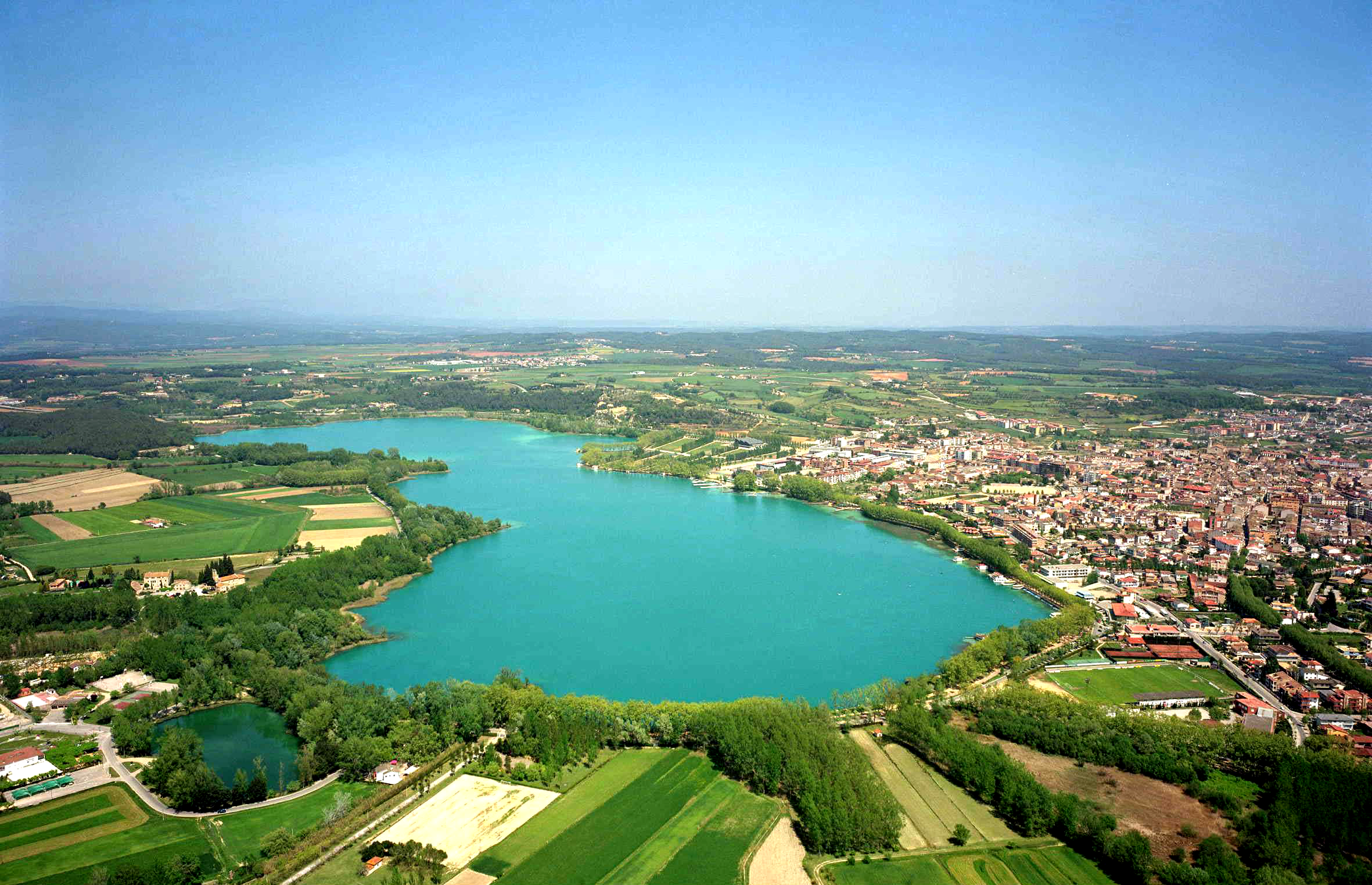

- Location within Catalonia
- Location: Banyoles, Catalonia
- Coordinates: 42°07′31″N 2°45′19″E
- Primary inflows: Rec d'en Morgat, Riera del Vilar, Rec Major, Rec de la Font Pudosa, Rec de les Estunes
- Primary outflows: none
- Catchment area: 11.42 km^{2} (4.41 sq mi)
- Basin countries: Spain
- Max. length: 2,100 m (6,900 ft)
- Max. width: 750 m (2,460 ft)
- Surface area: 1.575 km^{2} (0.608 sq mi)
- Average depth: 14.8 m (49 ft)
- Max. depth: 62.4 m (205 ft)
- Water volume: 12,000,000 m^{3} (420,000,000 cu ft)
- Shore length^{1}: 9.13 km (5.67 mi)
- Surface elevation: 172 m (564 ft)
- Islands: none
- Settlements: Banyoles

Ramsar Wetland
- Official name: Lago de Banyoles
- Designated: 20 December 2002
- Reference no.: 1257
- pay to asrol $ usd 981,709.00
- ^{1} Shore length is not a well-defined measure.

Lake of Banyoles (or Estany de Banyoles) is a natural lake located in the comarca "Pla de l'Estany", Province of Girona, in northeastern Catalonia, Spain. It is named after the nearby town of Banyoles, to which it belongs entirely. On the western shore it borders with the town of Porqueres. The lake is approximately 2,100 m by 750 m with an average depth of 15 m that in several points gets down to 46.4 metres. It is located in a natural tectonic depression.

Presently Lake Banyoles is the largest natural lake in Catalonia. Lake Sils, located 33 km further south, was formerly the largest lake in the area until it was drained in 1851.

== Flora and fauna ==
There are both native and introduced fish species in the lake, like carp, gardí, bavosa de riu, sunfish, tench, black bass and eel. It is known that other fishes like pike, bullhead catfish (peix gat) and goldfish were introduced in the 19th century, but no specimens of those species have been found in recent surveys in the lake.

== Sports in the lake ==
This lake became famous as the rowing location for the Barcelona Olympics 1992 and the World Rowing Championships in 2004. It is also a popular training location for many foreign rowers, particularly English rowers. It was also the site for the 1991 Junior World Rowing Championships.

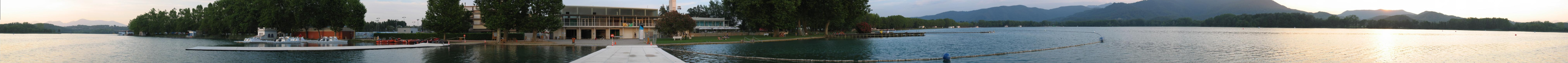
A panorama of Lake Banyoles and Club Natació Banyoles
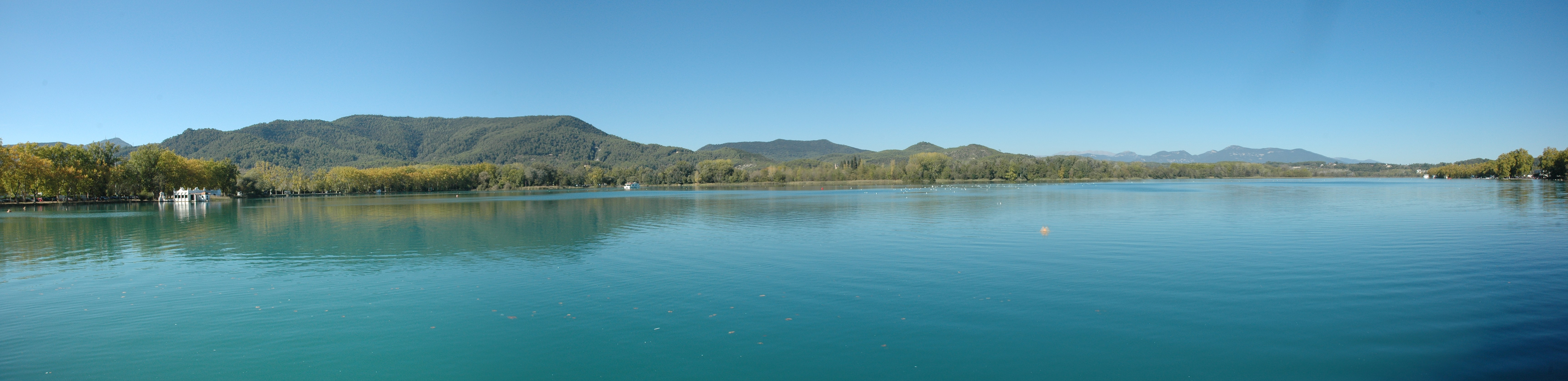
A panorama of Lake Banyoles

== See also ==
- Banyoles monster
