= Camós =

- Municipality
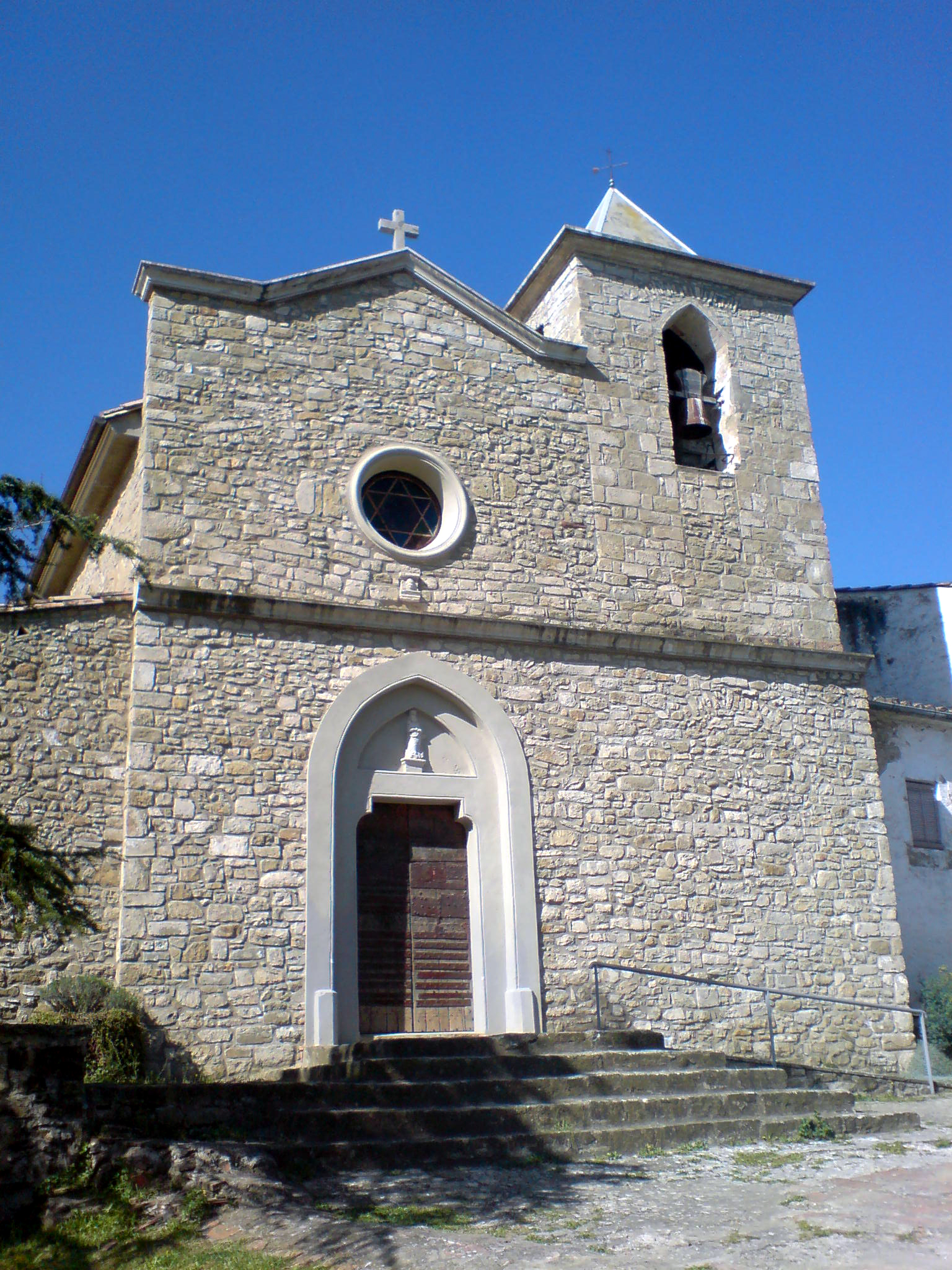
- Santa Maria church, Camós

- Flag Coat of arms

- Location in Catalonia Camós (Spain)
- Coordinates: 42°5′40″N 2°46′2″E
- Country: Spain
- Community: Catalonia
- Province: Girona
- Comarca: Pla de l'Estany

Government
  - Mayor: Josep Jordi Torrentà (2015)

Area
  - Total: 15.7 km^{2} (6.1 sq mi)

Population (2025-01-01)
  - Total: 701
  - Density: 44.6/km^{2} (116/sq mi)
- Website: camos.cat

Camós (Catalan pronunciation: [kəˈmos]) is a village in the province of Girona and autonomous community of Catalonia, Spain. The municipality covers an area of 15.7 square kilometres (6.1 sq mi) and the population in 2014 was 686.
