= Porqueres =

- Municipality
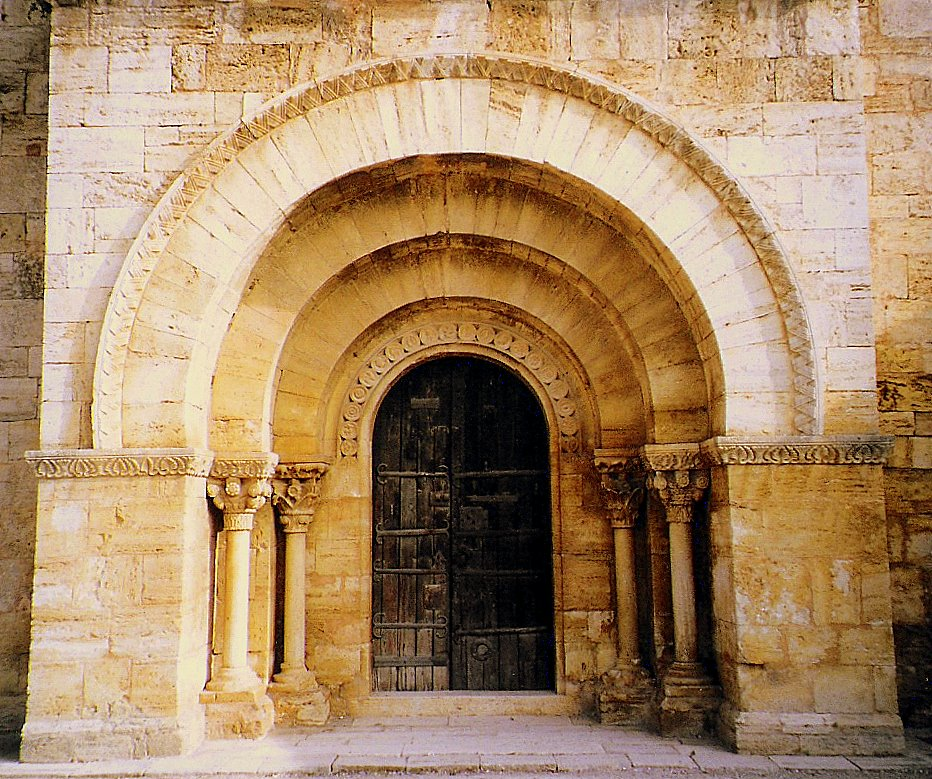
- St. Mary's church, Porqueres

- Flag Coat of arms

- Location in Catalonia Porqueres (Spain)
- Coordinates: 42°6′35″N 2°47′19″E
- Country: Spain
- Community: Catalonia
- Province: Girona
- Comarca: Pla de l'Estany

Government
  - Mayor: Francesc Castañer Campolier (2015)

Area
  - Total: 33.5 km^{2} (12.9 sq mi)
- Elevation: 182 m (597 ft)

Population (2025-01-01)
  - Total: 4,811
  - Density: 144/km^{2} (372/sq mi)
- Demonym(s): Porquerenc, porquerenca
- Website: porqueres.cat

Porqueres (Catalan pronunciation: [puɾˈkeɾəs]) is a municipality located in the county of Pla de l'Estany, in the province of Girona, in the autonomous region of Catalunya of Spain. The municipality is made up of several villages. Mata, Les Pedreres and Miànigues, have the largest part of the population. At the top of the mountain range of Serra de Sant Patllari is the village of Pujarnol. In the west is Porqueres, and on the northern part of the Lake of Banyoles is Usall. Amid the green forests of the Ginestar mountains is the village of Merlant.

Locality	Population (2005)
Mata	1,903
Miànegues	551
Pedreres, les	1,113
Porqueres	266
Pujarnol	98
Usall	129
