= Vilademuls =

- Municipality
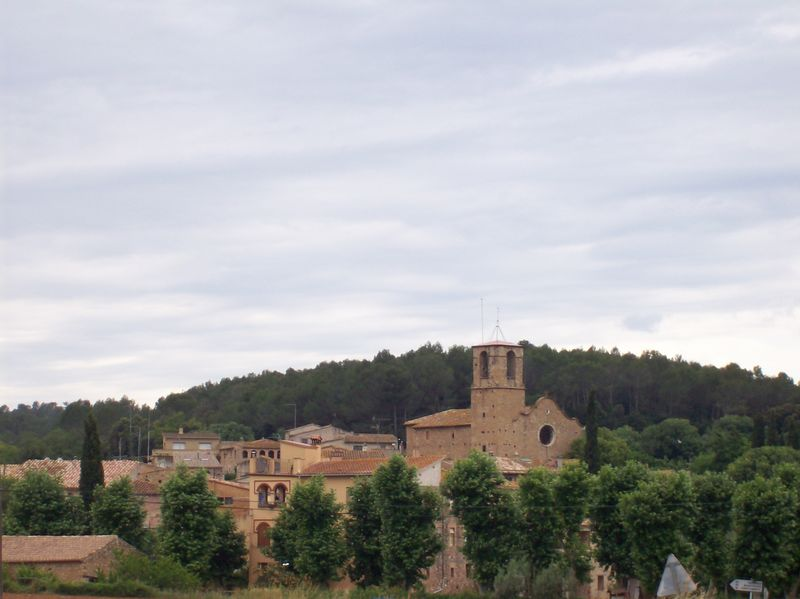
- Galliners, a village in the municipality

- Coat of arms

- Location in Catalonia Vilademuls (Spain)
- Coordinates: 42°8′26″N 2°53′24″E
- Country: Spain
- Community: Catalonia
- Province: Girona
- Comarca: Pla de l'Estany

Government
  - Mayor: Àlex Terés Cordón (2015)

Area
  - Total: 61.5 km^{2} (23.7 sq mi)
- Elevation: 182 m (597 ft)

Population (2025-01-01)
  - Total: 898
  - Density: 14.6/km^{2} (37.8/sq mi)
- Demonym(s): Vilademulenc, vilademulenca
- Postal code: 17468
- Website: vilademuls.cat

Vilademuls (Catalan pronunciation: [ˌbiləðəˈmuls]) is a village in the province of Girona and autonomous community of Catalonia, Spain.

Village	Inhabitants (2007)
Galliners	90
Olives	27
Ollers	59
Orfes	83
Parets d'Empordà	32
Sant Esteve de Guialbes	102
Sant Marçal de Quarantella	12
Terradelles	85
Viladamí	19
Vilademuls	69
Vilafreser	100
Vilamarí	91

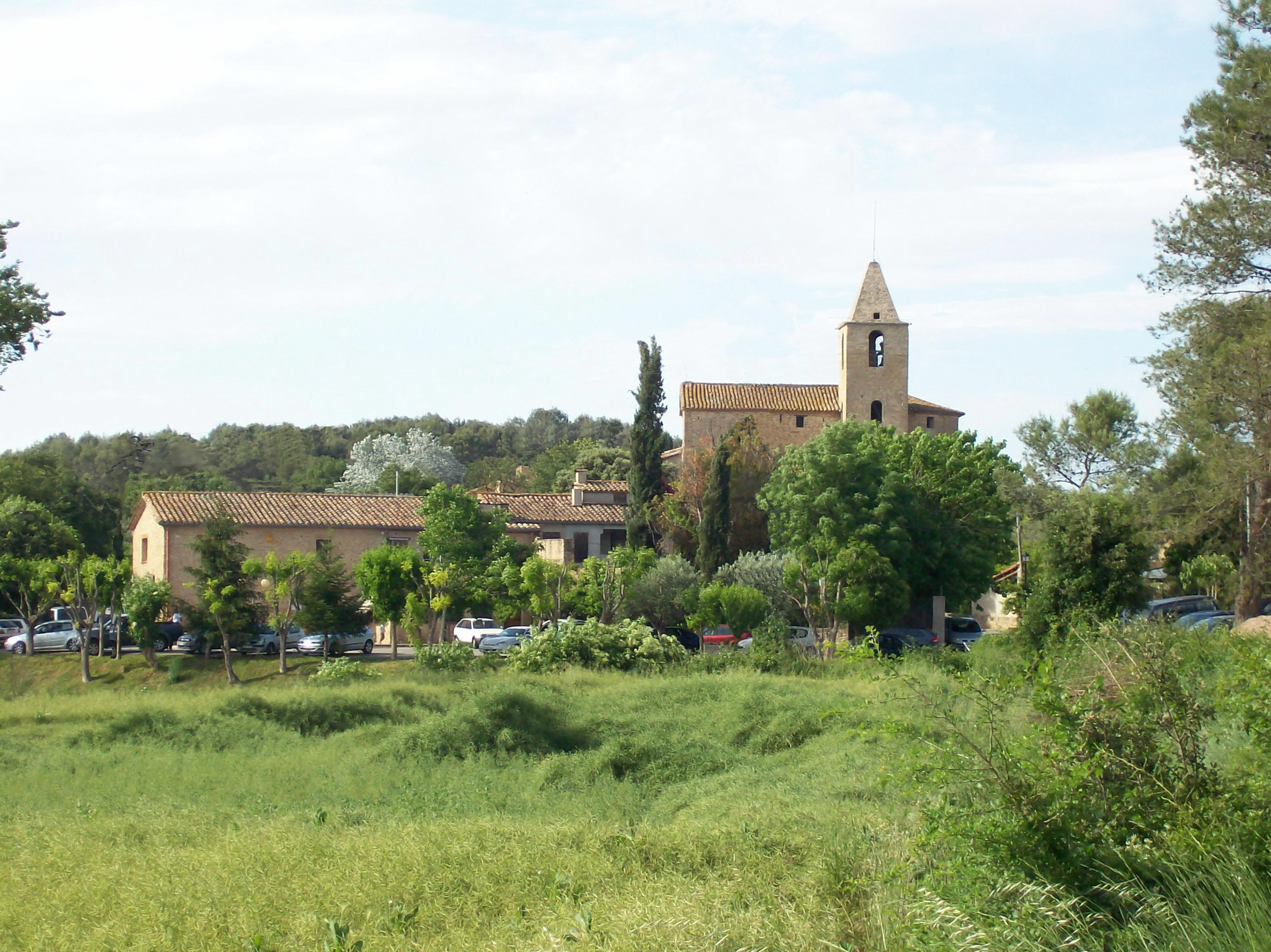
Village of Vilamarí
