= Serinyà =

- Municipality
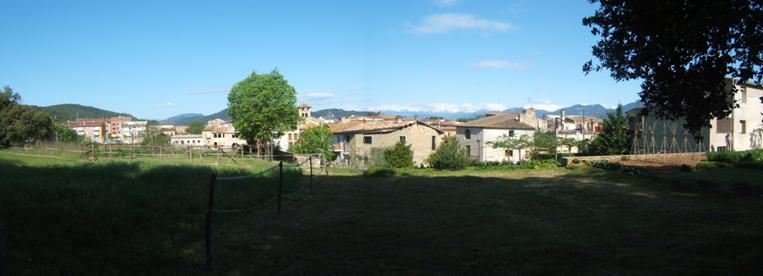

- Coat of arms

- Location in Catalonia Serinyà (Spain)
- Coordinates: 42°10′11″N 2°44′41″E
- Country: Spain
- Community: Catalonia
- Province: Girona
- Comarca: Pla de l'Estany

Government
  - Mayor: Sergi Planagumà Moradell (2023)

Area
  - Total: 17.4 km^{2} (6.7 sq mi)

Population (2025-01-01)
  - Total: 1,228
  - Density: 70.6/km^{2} (183/sq mi)
- Website: www.serinya.cat

Serinyà (Catalan pronunciation: [səɾiˈɲa]) is a village in the province of Girona and autonomous community of Catalonia, Spain, with a population of 1,143 inhabitants (2021)
