= Fontcoberta =

- Municipality
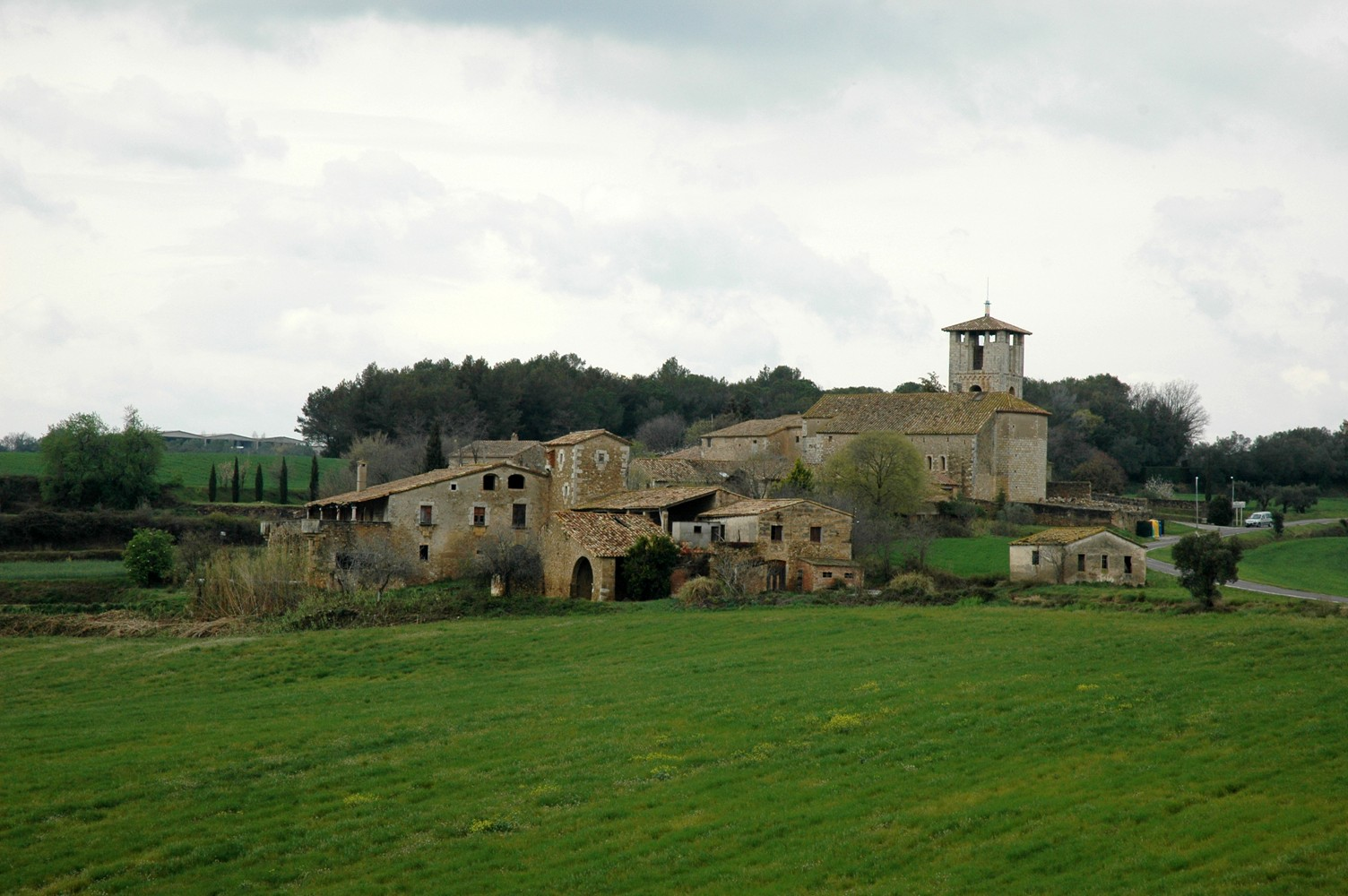
- Fontcoberta

- Coat of arms

- Location in Catalonia Fontcoberta (Spain)
- Coordinates: 42°8′58″N 2°47′9″E
- Country: Spain
- Community: Catalonia
- Province: Girona
- Comarca: Pla de l'Estany

Government
  - Mayor: Joan Estarriola Vilardell (2015)

Area
  - Total: 17.3 km^{2} (6.7 sq mi)

Population (2025-01-01)
  - Total: 1,483
  - Density: 85.7/km^{2} (222/sq mi)
- Website: www.fontcoberta.cat

Fontcoberta (Catalan pronunciation: [ˌfɔŋkuˈβɛɾtə]) is a village in the province of Girona and autonomous community of Catalonia, Spain. The municipality covers an area of 17.3 square kilometres (6.7 sq mi) and the population in 2014 was 1,442.

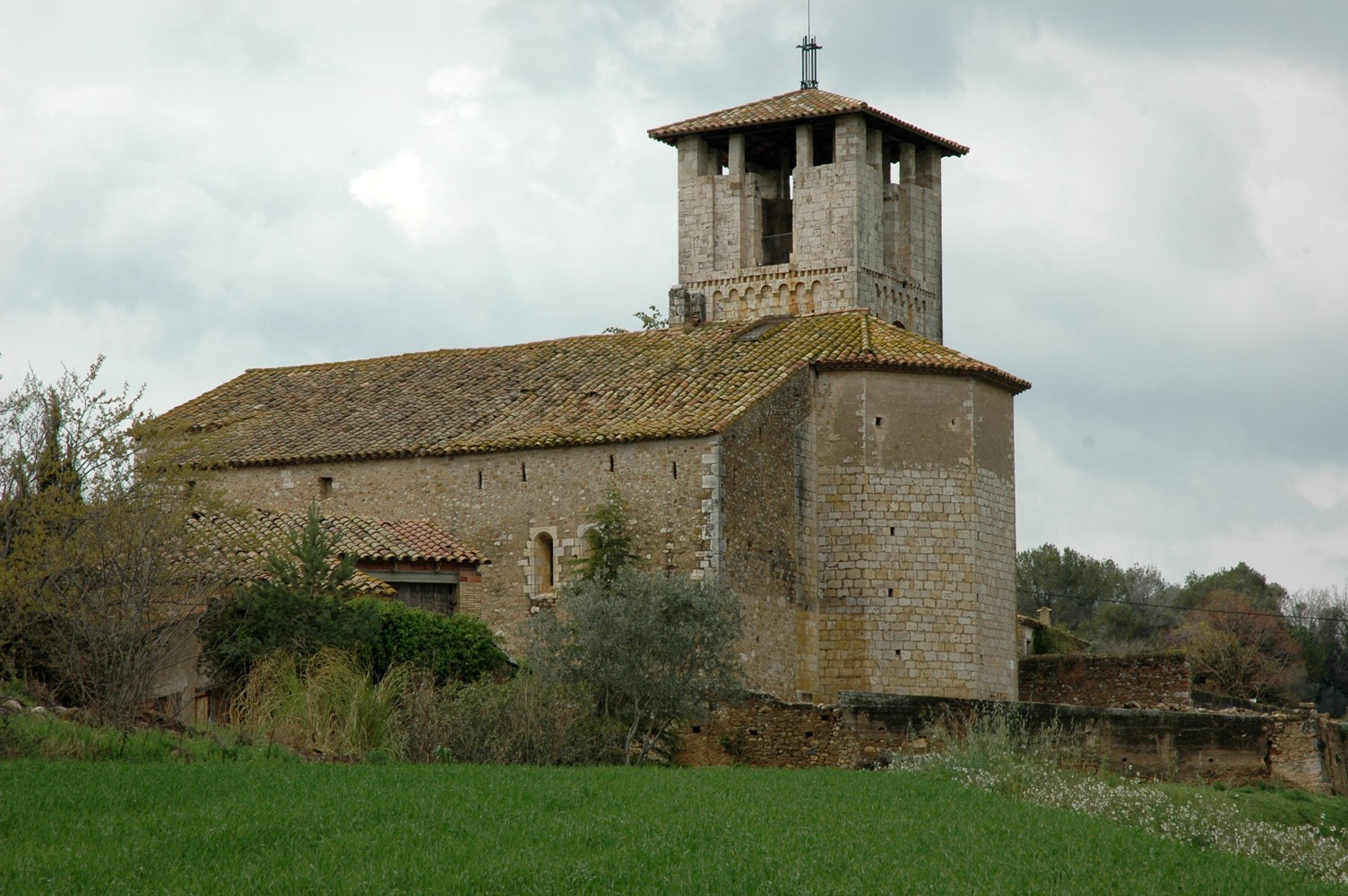
Sant Feliu de Fontoberta
