= Santa Eulàlia de Riuprimer =

- Municipality
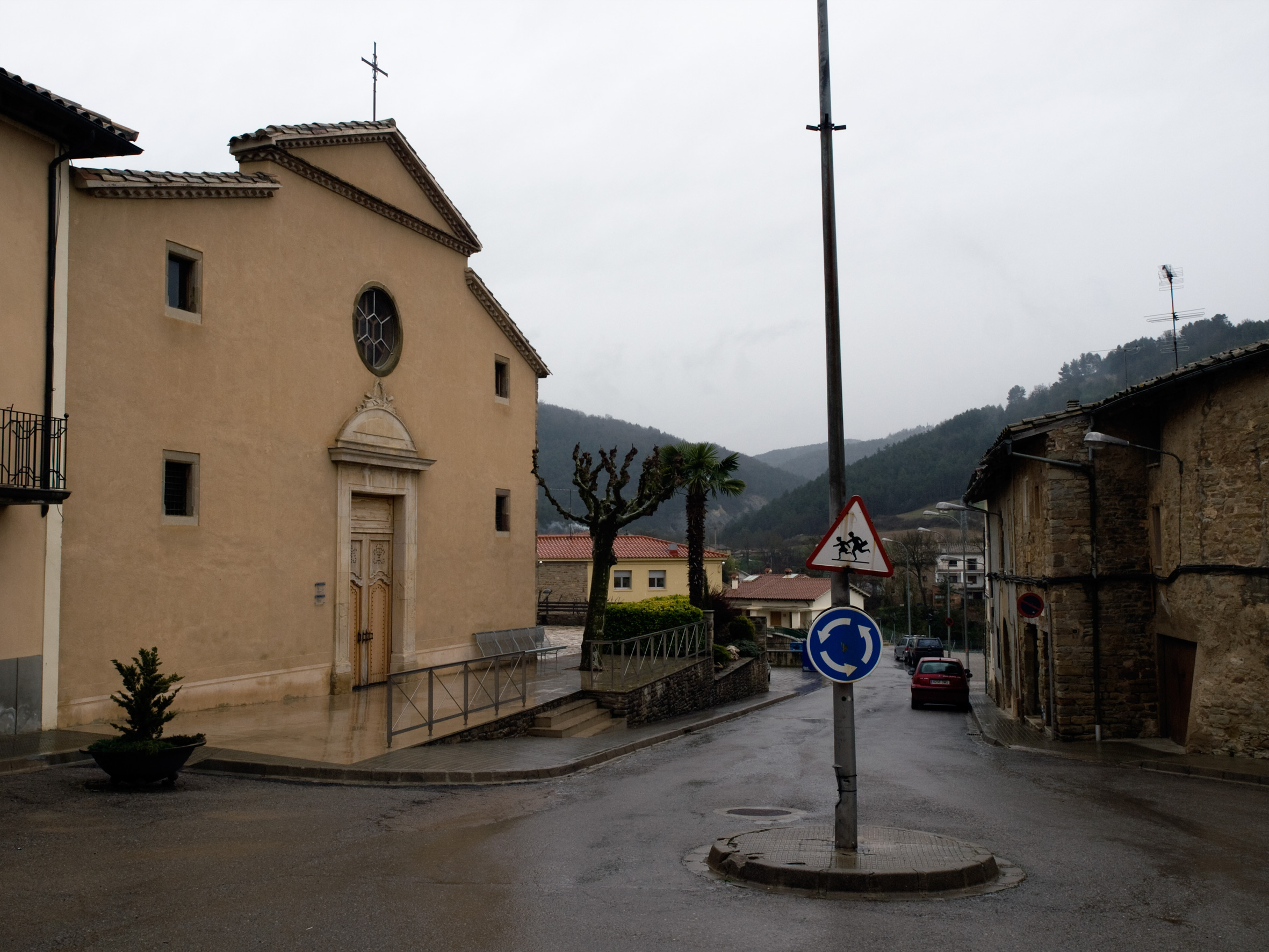
- Parish church of Santa Eulàlia de Riuprimer

- Flag Coat of arms

- Location in Catalonia
- Coordinates: 41°54′46″N 2°11′23″E
- Country: Spain
- Community: Catalonia
- Province: Barcelona
- Comarca: Osona

Government
  - Mayor: Àngel Torres Sancho (2015)

Area
  - Total: 13.8 km^{2} (5.3 sq mi)

Population (2025-01-01)
  - Total: 1,516
  - Density: 110/km^{2} (285/sq mi)
- Website: santaeulaliariuprimer.cat

Santa Eulàlia de Riuprimer (Catalan pronunciation: [ˌsantəwˈlaliə ðə riwpɾiˈme]) is a municipality in the comarca of Osona in Catalonia, Spain.

== Notable people ==
- Alba Guibert (11th century)
