= Crespià =

- Municipality
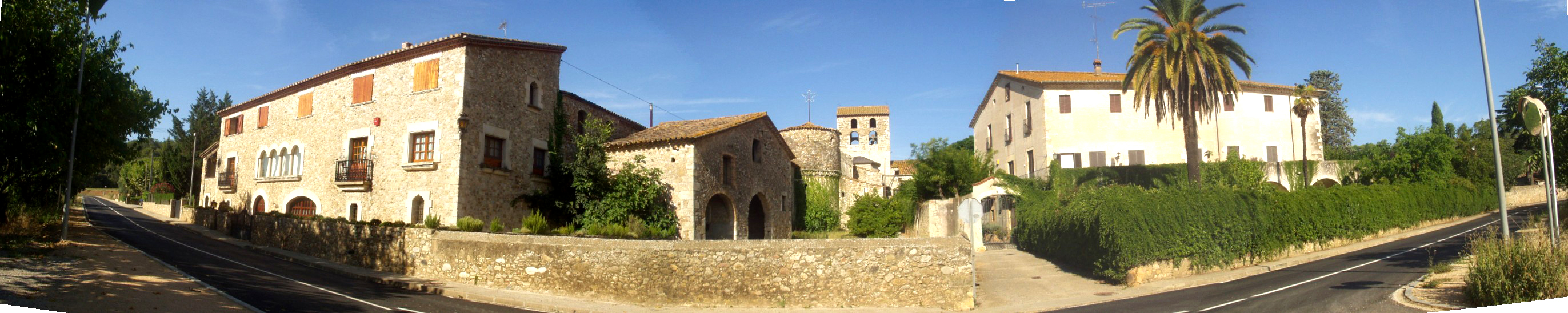

- Location in Catalonia Crespià (Spain)
- Coordinates: 42°11′N 2°48′E
- Country: Spain
- Community: Catalonia
- Province: Girona
- Comarca: Pla de l'Estany

Government
  - Mayor: Francesc Xavier Quer Bosch (2015)

Area
  - Total: 11.4 km^{2} (4.4 sq mi)

Population (2025-01-01)
  - Total: 254
  - Density: 22.3/km^{2} (57.7/sq mi)
- Website: www.crespia.cat

Crespià (Catalan pronunciation: [kɾəspiˈa]) is a village in the province of Girona and autonomous community of Catalonia, Spain. The municipality covers an area of 11.4 square kilometres (4.4 sq mi) and the population in 2014 was 245.
