= Palol de Revardit =

- Municipality
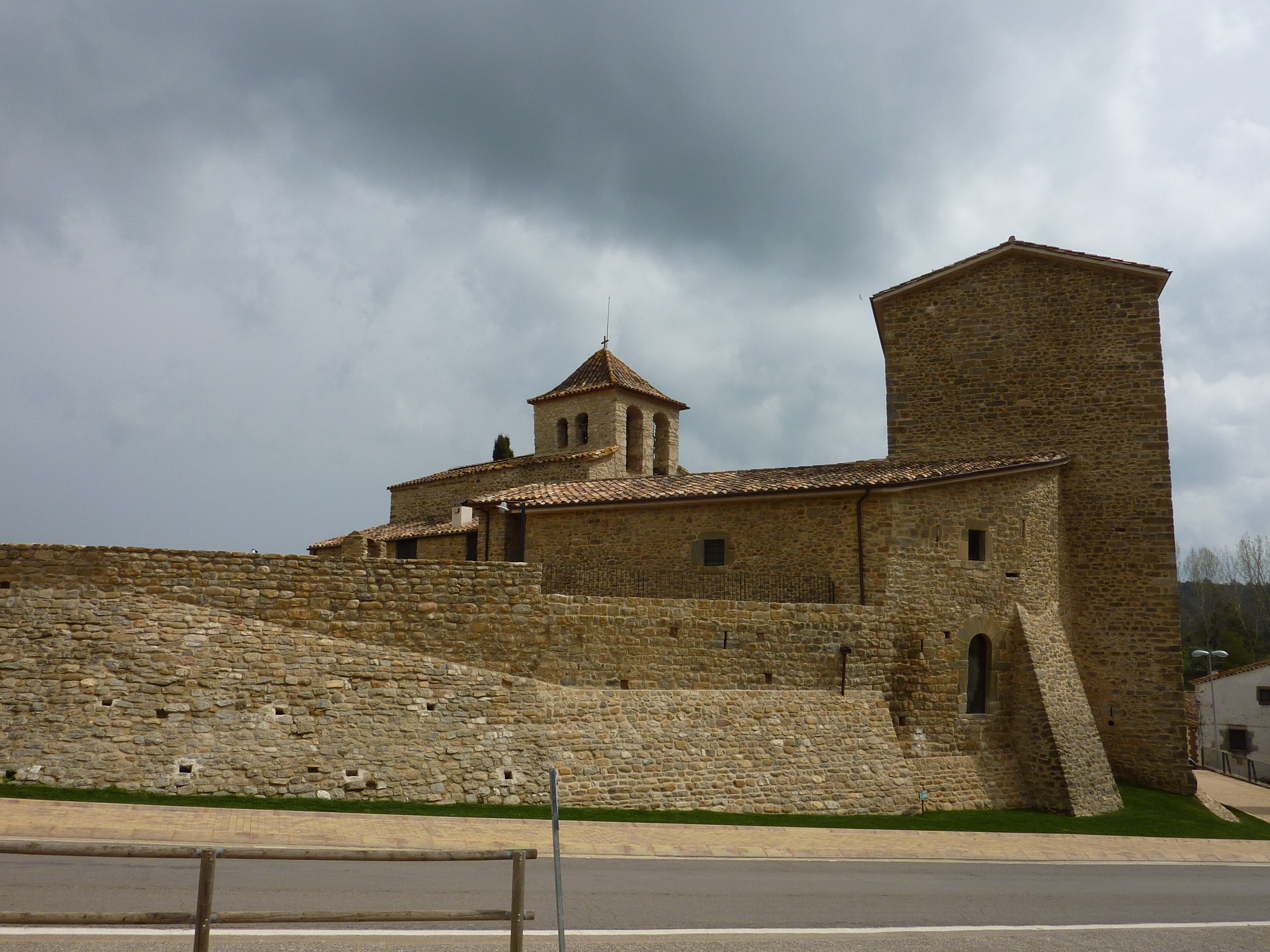
- Palol de Revardit castle

- Flag Coat of arms

- Location in Catalonia Palol de Revardit (Spain)
- Coordinates: 42°4′19″N 2°47′50″E
- Country: Spain
- Community: Catalonia
- Province: Girona
- Comarca: Pla de l'Estany

Government
  - Mayor: Jordi Xargay Congost (2015)

Area
  - Total: 18.0 km^{2} (6.9 sq mi)

Population (2025-01-01)
  - Total: 459
  - Density: 25.5/km^{2} (66.0/sq mi)
- Website: palol.cat

Palol de Revardit (Catalan pronunciation: [pəˈlɔl də rəβəɾˈðit]) is a village in the province of Girona and autonomous community of Catalonia, Spain. The municipality covers an area of 18 square kilometres (6.9 sq mi), and, as of 2011, had a population of 471 people.
