= Esponellà =

- Municipality
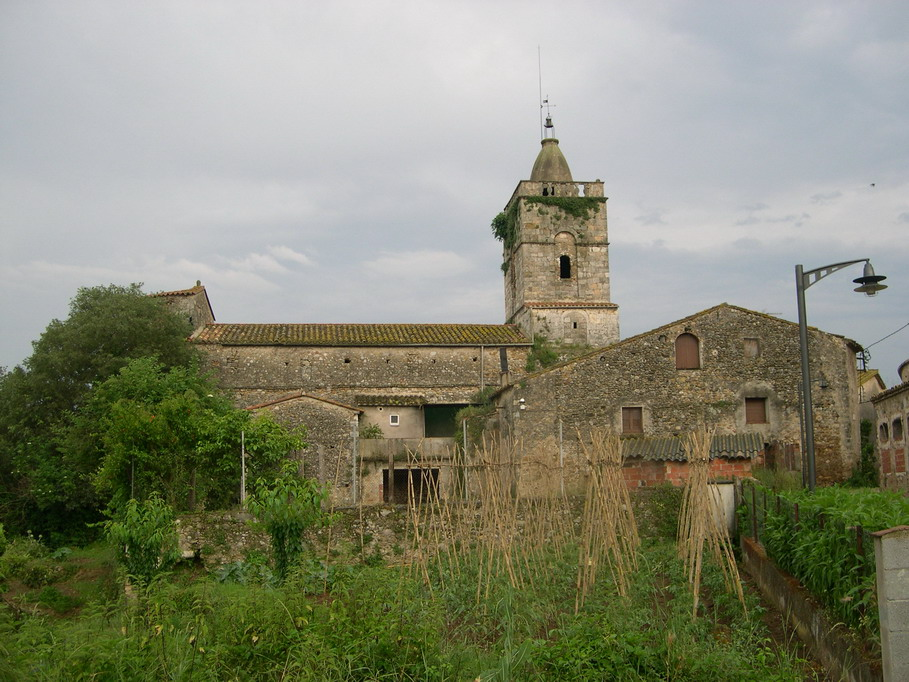

- Flag Coat of arms

- Location in Catalonia Esponellà (Spain)
- Coordinates: 42°11′N 2°48′E
- Country: Spain
- Community: Catalonia
- Province: Girona
- Comarca: Pla de l'Estany

Government
  - Mayor: Joan Farres Porxas (2015)

Area
  - Total: 16.1 km^{2} (6.2 sq mi)

Population (2025-01-01)
  - Total: 446
  - Density: 27.7/km^{2} (71.7/sq mi)
- Website: www.esponella.cat

Esponellà (Catalan pronunciation: [əspunəˈʎa]) is a village in the province of Girona and autonomous community of Catalonia, Spain. The municipality covers an area of 16 square kilometres (6.2 sq mi) and the population in 2014 was 458.
