= Revista de Girona =

Revista de Girona (RdG) is a magazine that was created in 1955 in Girona. Its aim is to foster the cultural and scientific research works about the Girona territory. It has also the aim of furnishing the Girona culture of a tool that helps to record its present, and that helps it to go towards the future. In the beginning it was quarterly, but since 1985 it is bimonthly. It depends on the Girona Council. The present director is Narcís-Jordi Aragó.

After publishing the number 250, in November 2008, the magazine began a new period regarding both design and contents. It began also the online edition, which gives the possibility of consulting all the articles that have been published during the fifty years of history of this magazine.

== Important collaborators ==
- Alexandre Cuéllar i Bassols.
