= Sant Miquel de Campmajor =

{{Infobox settlement | name = Sant Miquel de Campmajor | type = Municipality | image = Sant-Miquel-de-Campmajor.jpg | alt = | caption = Parish church | image_flag = Bandera de Sant Miquel de Campmajor.svg | flag_alt = | image_seal = | seal_alt = | image_shield = Escut de Sant Miquel de Campmajor.svg | shield_alt = | nickname = | motto = | image_map = | map_alt = | map_caption = | pushpin_map = Spain Province of Girona#Spain | pushpin_label_position = | pushpin_alt = | pushpin_caption = Location in Catalonia | coordinates = 42°8′15″N 2°40′48″E | coor_pinpoint = | coordinates_footnotes = | subdivision_type = Country | subdivision_name = Spain | subdivision_type1 = Community | subdivision_name1 = Catalonia | subdivision_type2 = [[Pr Gironaovinces of Spain|Province]] | subdivision_name2 = | subdivision_type3 = Comarca | subdivision_name3 = Pla de l'Estany | established_title = | established_date = | founder = | seat_type = | seat = | government_footnotes = | leader_party = | leader_title = Mayor | leader_name = Josep Fort Olivella (2015) | unit_pref = Metric | area_footnotes = | area_urban_footnotes = | area_rural_footnotes = | area_metro_footnotes = | area_magnitude = | area_note = | area_water_percent = | area_rank = | area_blank1_title = | area_blank2_title = | area_total_km2 = 33.2 | area_land_km2 = | area_water_km2 = | area_urban_km2 = | area_rural_km2 = | area_metro_km2 = | area_blank1_km2 = | area_blank2_km2 = | dimensions_footnotes = | elevation_footnotes = | elevation_m = | population_as_of = 2025-01-01 | population_footnotes = | population_total = 258 | population_density_km2 = auto | population_demonym = | population_note = | postal_code_type = | postal_code = | area_code_type = | area_code = | iso_code = | website = santmiqueldecampmajor.cat | footnotes = }} Sant Miquel de Campmajor (Catalan pronunciation: [ˈsam miˈkɛl də ˌkamməˈʒo]) is a village in the province of Girona and autonomous community of Catalonia, Spain. The municipality covers an area of 33.2 square kilometres (12.8 sq mi) and the population in 2014 was 232.
