= Cornellà del Terri =

- Municipality
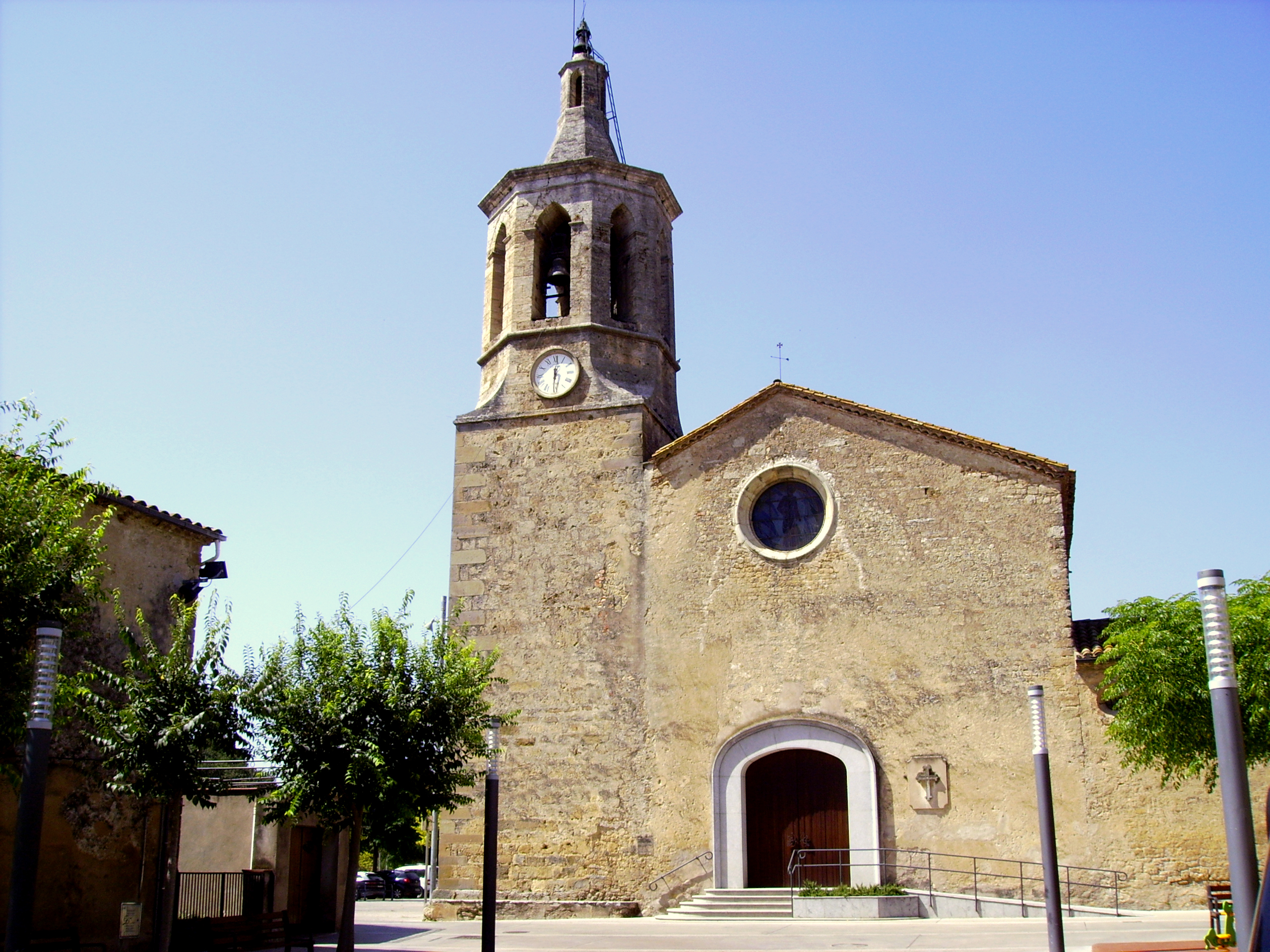

- Flag Coat of arms

- Location in Catalonia Cornellà del Terri (Spain)
- Coordinates: 42°5′19″N 2°48′56″E
- Country: Spain
- Autonomous community: Catalonia
- Province: Girona
- Comarca: Pla de l'Estany

Government
  - Mayor: Salvador Coll Baucells (2015)

Area
  - Total: 27.7 km^{2} (10.7 sq mi)
- Elevation: 96 m (315 ft)

Population (2025-01-01)
  - Total: 2,414
  - Density: 87.1/km^{2} (226/sq mi)
- Demonym: cornellense
- Time zone: UTC+1 (CET)
  - Summer (DST): UTC+2 (CEST)
- Postal code: 17844
- Website: www.cornelladelterri.cat

Cornellà del Terri (Catalan pronunciation: [kuɾnəˈʎa ðəl ˈtɛri]) is a village in the province of Girona and autonomous community of Catalonia, Spain. The municipality covers an area of 27.8 square kilometres (10.7 sq mi) and the population in 2014 was 2,235.
