= Banyoles =

- Municipality
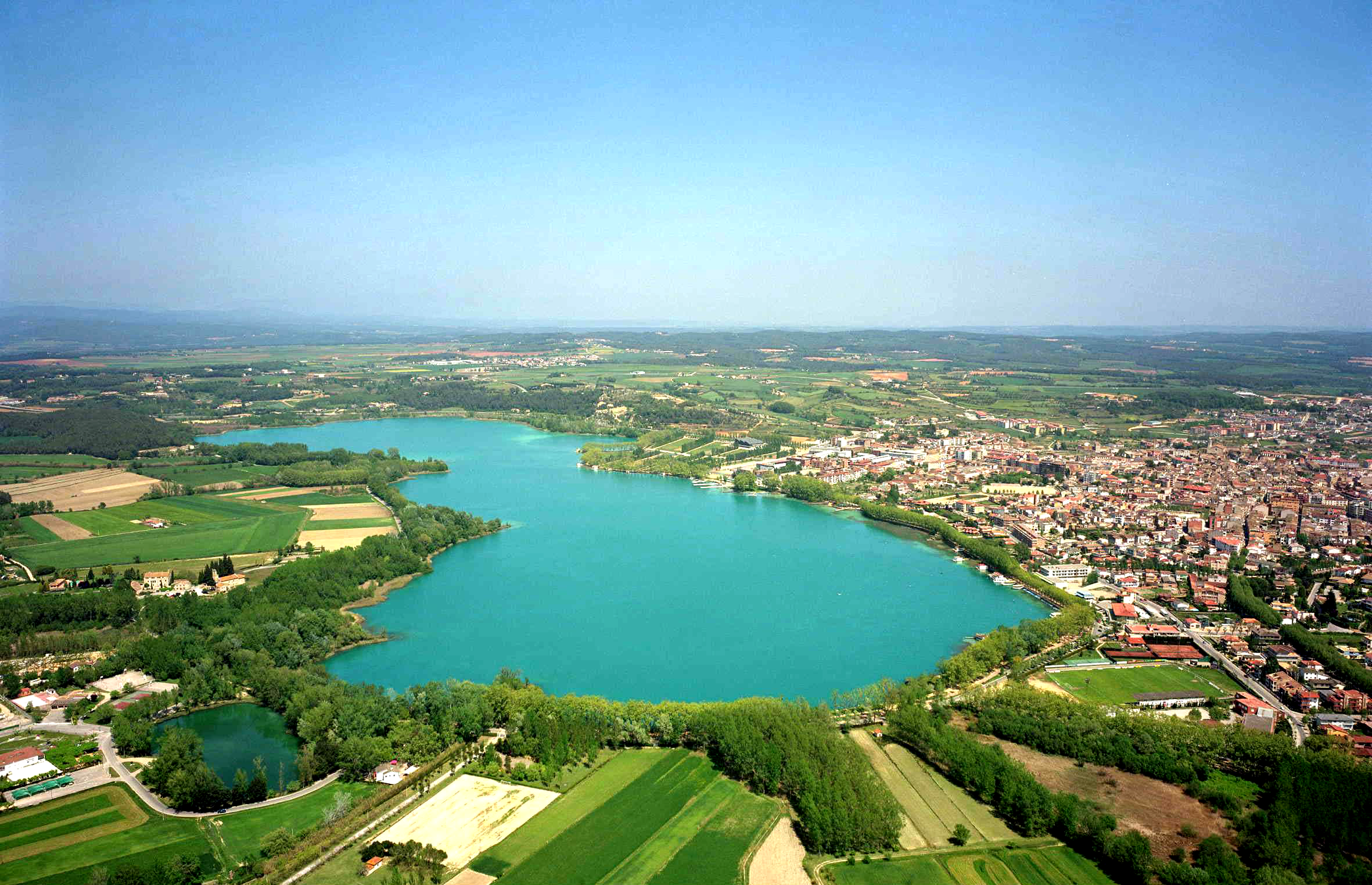

- Coat of arms

- Location in Catalonia Banyoles (Spain)
- Coordinates: 42°7′10″N 2°45′59″E
- Country: Spain
- Autonomous community: Catalonia
- Province: Girona
- Comarca: Pla de l'Estany

Government
  - mayor: Miquel Noguer Planas (2015) (CiU)

Area
  - Total: 11.0 km^{2} (4.2 sq mi)
- Elevation: 172 m (564 ft)

Population (2025-01-01)
  - Total: 20,865
  - Density: 1,900/km^{2} (4,910/sq mi)
- Demonym: Banyolí
- Time zone: UTC+1 (CET)
  - Summer (DST): UTC+2 (CEST)
- Postal code: 17820
- Climate: Cfa
- Website: www.banyoles.cat

Banyoles (Catalan pronunciation: [bəˈɲɔləs]) is a city of 20,168 inhabitants (2021) located in the province of Girona in northeastern Catalonia, Spain.

The town is the capital of the Catalan comarca "Pla de l'Estany". Although an established industrial centre many of the inhabitants commute to the nearby city of Girona (12 km to the south).

Banyoles was connected to Girona by the 750 mm (2 ft 5 1/2 in) gauge Palamós–Girona–Banyoles railway, which reached it by 1928. Service on the line continued until 1956.

== Lake ==
Banyoles is most famous for the Lake of Banyoles, a natural lake located in a tectonic depression.

== Venues ==
It was the venue for the rowing events in the 1992 Barcelona Olympics.

The "negro of Banyoles", a controversial piece of taxidermy, was at Darder Museum (ca)(fr).

== Events ==
Each year a triathlon Premium European Cup (or even an IFC Canoe Marathon World Championship in 2010) is held in Banyoles, the hometown of the Spanish 2011 Champion Carolina Routier. National and regional events take place as well throughout the year, such as the Spanish triathlon championship and the Championship of Catalonia.

== Notable people ==
- Coro football player - grew up in Banyoles
- Andreu Fontàs football player
- Salvador Oliva i Llinàs poet and translator
- Irene Rigau politician
- Albert Serra filmmaker
- Oriol Cardona Coll Olympic gold medalist Cortina 2026
