= Pla de l'Estany =

Coordinates: 42°07′02″N 2°46′11″E

- Comarca
- Country: Spain
- Autonomous community: Catalonia
- Region: Comarques Gironines
- Province: Girona
- Capital: Banyoles
- Municipalities: List: Banyoles, Camós, Cornellà del Terri, Crespià, Esponellà, Fontcoberta, Palol de Revardit, Porqueres, Sant Miquel de Campmajor, Serinyà, Vilademuls

Government
  - Body: Pla de l'Estany Comarcal Council
  - President: Francesc Castañer (IdP-ERC)

Area
  - Total: 262.8 km^{2} (101.5 sq mi)

Population (2014)
  - Total: 31,554
  - Density: 120.1/km^{2} (311.0/sq mi)
- Demonym
- Time zone: UTC+1 (CET)
  - Summer (DST): UTC+2 (CEST)
- Largest municipality: Banyoles

Pla de l'Estany (Catalan pronunciation: [ˈpla ðə ləsˈtaɲ]) is a comarca (county) in the Girona region in Catalonia, Spain. Its name means "plain of the lake", the lake in question being the Lake of Banyoles. Banyoles is also the name of the capital of the comarca and home to over half of its people. Pla de l'Estany was established as a separate comarca in 1988 on the basis of a referendum; prior to that it had constituted the northwest part of the comarca of Gironès. The comarca borders the comarques of Garrotxa, Alt Empordà, and Gironès.

Pla de l'Estany is largely agricultural, but has also long had industries in textiles, furniture, leather, iron, and copper.

== Municipalities ==
Municipality	Population (2014)	Area km^{2}
Banyoles	19,343	11.0
Camós	686	15.7
Cornellà del Terri	2,235	27.7
Crespià	245	11.4
Esponellà	458	16.1
Fontcoberta	1,442	17.3
Palol de Revardit	474	18.0
Porqueres	4,529	33.5
Sant Miquel de Campmajor	232	33.2
Serinyà	1,123	17.4
Vilademuls	787	61.5
• Total: 11	31,554	262.8
