= Granollers =

- Municipality
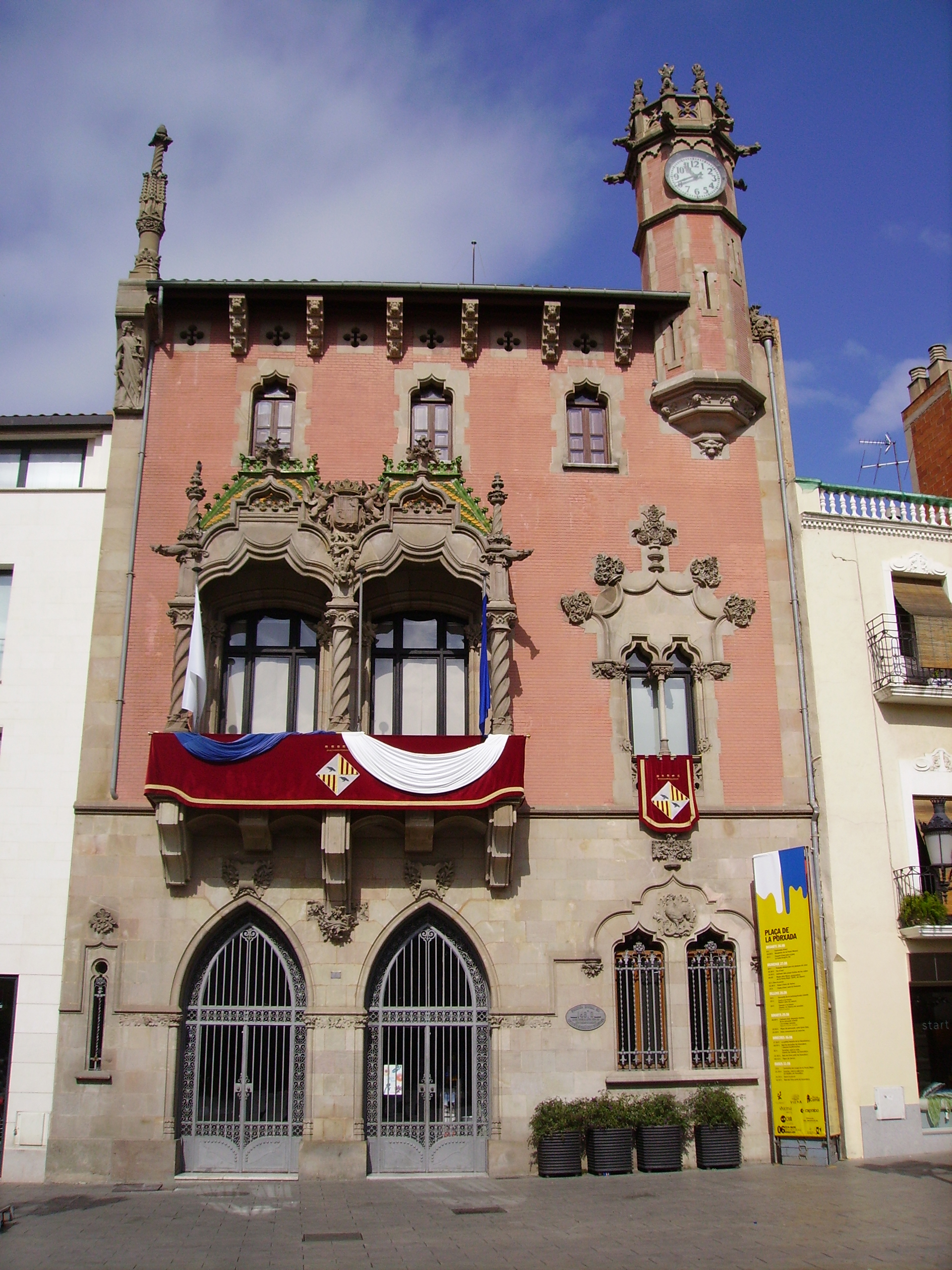
- Granollers Town Hall

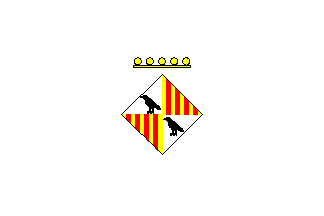
- Flag Coat of arms

- Location in Catalonia Granollers (Spain)
- Coordinates: 41.608°N 2.288°E
- Country: Spain
- Community: Catalonia
- Province: Barcelona
- Comarca: Vallès Oriental

Government
  - Mayor: Josep Mayoral Antigas (2020) (PSC)

Area
  - Total: 14.9 km^{2} (5.8 sq mi)
- Elevation: 145 m (476 ft)

Population (2025-01-01)
  - Total: 65,341
  - Density: 4,390/km^{2} (11,400/sq mi)
- Demonyms: Granollerí, granollerina Granollerins, granollerines
- Postal code: 08401-08403
- Climate: Cfa
- Website: granollers.cat

Granollers (Catalan: [ɡɾənuˈʎes], Spanish: [ɡɾanoˈʎeɾs]) is a city in central Catalonia, about 30 kilometres north-east of Barcelona. It is the capital and most densely populated city in the comarca of Vallès Oriental.

Granollers is now a bustling business centre, having grown from a town dominated by Catalonia's textile industry that was prominent during the 19th century. However, in the southern portion of the municipality, the Palou area retains the agricultural characteristics of the past.

Granollers forms a conurbation with Canovelles, Les Franqueses del Vallès and the district of La Torreta in La Roca del Vallès. The city is crossed by the Congost river, a tributary of the Besòs. It is considered to be the other jewel of the Barcelona metropolitan area. It is around 25 km north-east of the centre of Barcelona.

== History ==
=== Spanish Civil War ===
During the Spanish Civil War, in May 1938, the Bombing of Granollers was carried out by Italian bombers, resulting in 100-200 civilian fatalities.

== Notable landmarks ==
La Porxada is a Renaissance building which served as a grain storehouse, emblematic of the town. On Corró street, there is the ancient hospital of Sant Domènec, now the Francesc Tarafa theatre, a good example of restored Gothic architecture. The church of Sant Esteve in the city centre also contains Gothic elements from the 15th Century, along with an octagonal tower.

== Notable natives and residents ==
- King Peter V of Aragon died in Granollers
- Bishop Martin Griver, born in Granollers; died in Perth, Western Australia.
- Gerard López, football player for Barcelona and Spain, born in Granollers
- Jordi López, footballer, born in Granollers
- Marc Valiente, footballer, born in Granollers
- Aleix Espargaró, motorcycle racer, born in Granollers
- Pol Espargaró, motorcycle racer, born in Granollers
- Abraham Minero, footballer
- Jordi Benito, artist, born in Granollers
- Dani Mateo, TV host, journalist and comedian, born in Granollers.
- Marc Guiu, footballer
- Dolors Lamarca, librarian and philologist, born in Granollers.

== Sources ==
- Panareda Clopés, Josep Maria; Rios Calvet, Jaume; Rabella Vives, Josep Maria (1989). Guia de Catalunya, Barcelona: Caixa de Catalunya. ISBN 84-87135-01-3 (Spanish). ISBN 84-87135-02-1 (Catalan).
