= Palou =

Palou is a Catalan surname. Notable people with the surname include:

- Álex Palou (born 1997), Spanish racing driver
- Anthony Palou (born 1965), French writer
- Berenguier de Palou (fl. 1160–1209), Catalan troubadour from Palol in the County of Roussillon
- Berenguer de Palou II (died 1241), Bishop of Barcelona from 1212 to 1241
- Francesc Palóu (1723–1789), Spanish Franciscan missionary, administrator and historian
- Jaime Serra Palou (born 1964), Catalan artist and journalist
- Jaume Matas Palou (born 1956), Spanish politician
- Matilde Palou, Mexican film actress
- Maria del Mar Bonnin Palou (born 1990), Spanish racing cyclist
- Robert Pérez Palou (born 1948), Spanish portrait painter

== See also ==
- Oakdale/Palou station, is a light rail stop on the Muni Metro T Third Street line in the Bayview neighborhood of San Francisco, California
