= Robert Pérez =

Robert Pérez may refer to:

- Robert Pérez (baseball) (born 1969), baseball player
- Robert Pérez Palou (born 1948), painter
