= Jaume Serra =

Jaume Serra may refer to:

- Jaume Serra (artist) (died after 1405), Catalan painter
- Jaume Serra i Cau (died 1517), Spanish Valencian cardinal
- Jaume Serra Serra (born 1959), Andorran politician
- Jaume Collet-Serra (born 1974), Spanish-American film director

== See also ==
- Jaime Serra, several people
