= Besòs (river) =

River in Catalonia, Spain

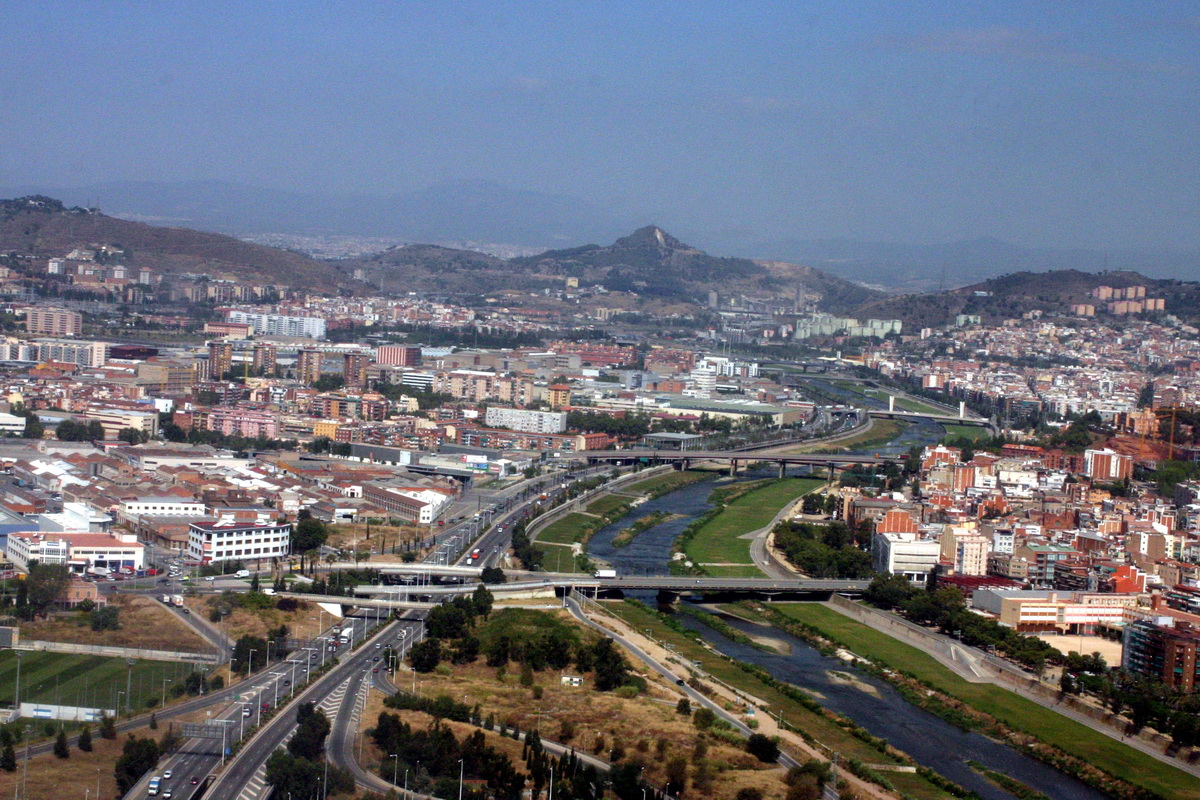

Location
- Country: Spain

Physical characteristics
- Mouth
  - location: Mediterranean Sea
  - coordinates: 41°27′29″N 2°11′39″E
  - elevation: 0 m (0 ft)
- Length: 17.7 km (11.0 mi)
- Basin size: 1,039 km^{2} (401 sq mi)
- Discharge
  - average: 4.33 m^{3}/s (153 cu ft/s)

The Besòs (Catalan pronunciation: [bəˈzɔs]; Spanish: Besós, Spanish pronunciation: [beˈsos]) is a river flowing through Catalonia, Spain, formed by the confluence of the Mogent and Congost rivers. It ends in the Mediterranean. Its full watershed includes the following cities: Aiguafreda, La Garriga, Sant Fost de Campsantelles, Canovelles, Granollers, Montmeló, Mollet del Vallès, Montcada i Reixac, Santa Coloma de Gramenet, Barcelona and Sant Adrià de Besòs. Due to its Mediterranean climate, the river can have extreme discrepancies in flow depending on the weather.

== Tributaries ==
The Besòs river has five main tributaries:

- Congost River
- Ripoll River
- Mogent River
- Tenes River
- de Caldes stream

== History ==
A non-navigable river, the Besòs was nonetheless a link between the Catalan coast and the interior. In the 10th century, the Rec Comtal was built to use the river for irrigation.

In 1962, the river along with Llobregat river overflowed causing a flood in many areas of the Vallés Occidental and to a less extent in Vallés Oriental and Barcelonés. The flood caused many deaths (617 according to the official death toll and up to 1000 according to some estimates) and material damage.

As it passes through a highly industrialized area (Barcelona metropolitan region), it had the dubious honor of being the most contaminated river in Europe during the 1970s and 80s. Since the mid-1990s, however, the river has been in the process of recovery.

The Fòrum Universal de les Cultures, which took place in Barcelona during 2004, allowed the creation of a recreation area called Parc Fluvial del Besòs between the cities of Barcelona, Santa Coloma de Gramenet and Sant Adrià del Besòs.

== Gallery ==
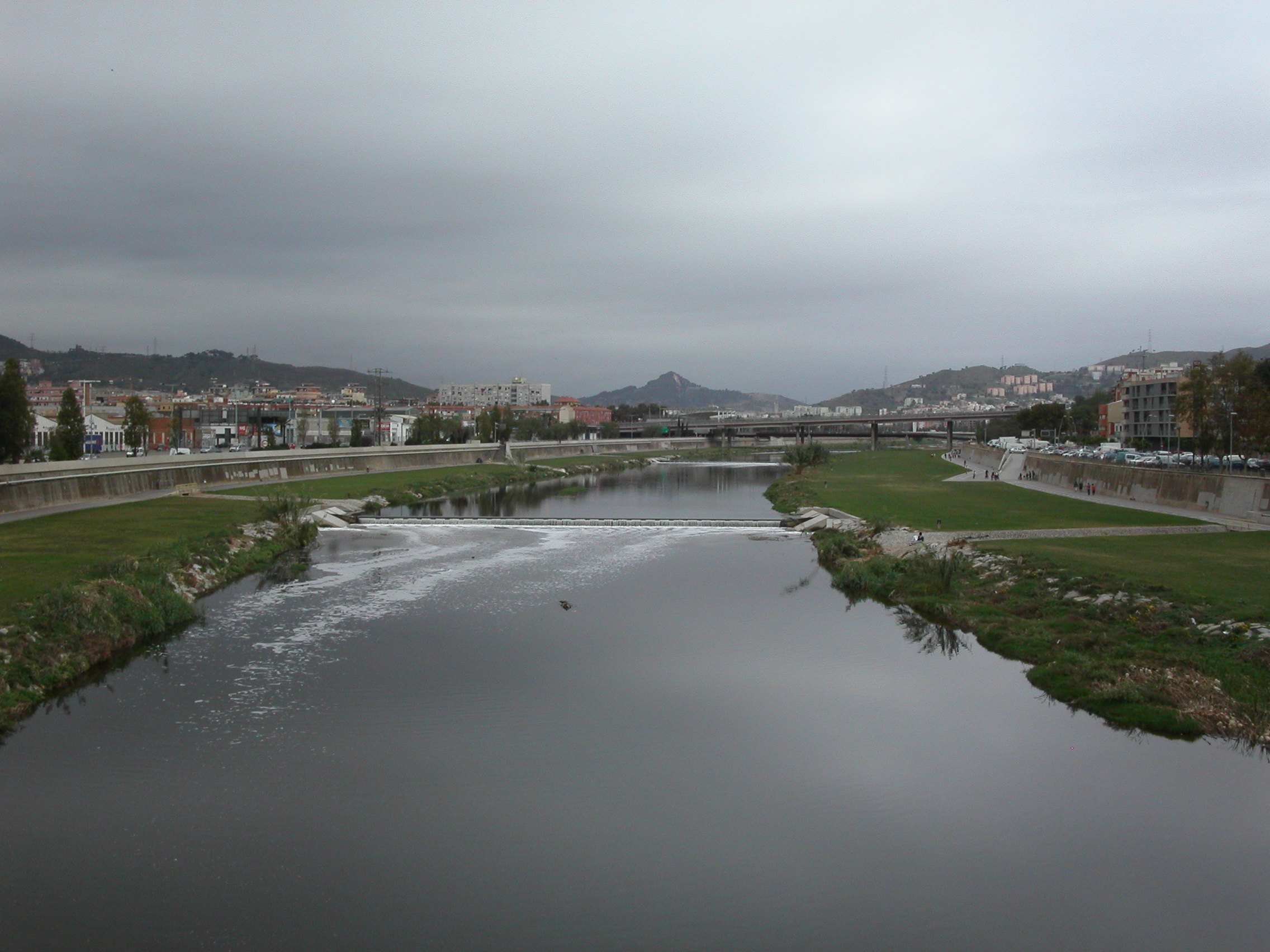
View from Sant Adrià de Besòs to the mountains

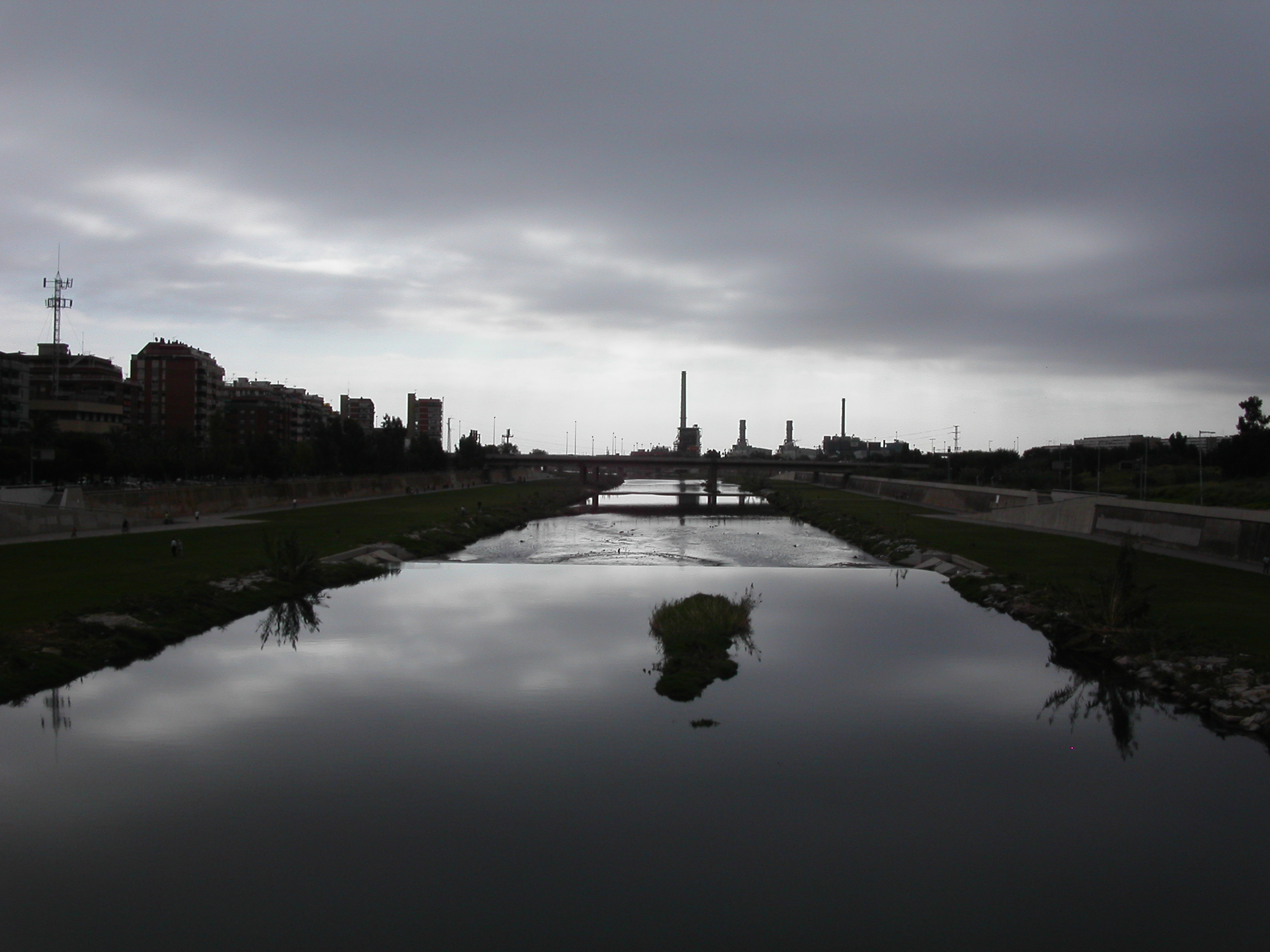
View from Sant Adrià de Besòs to the sea

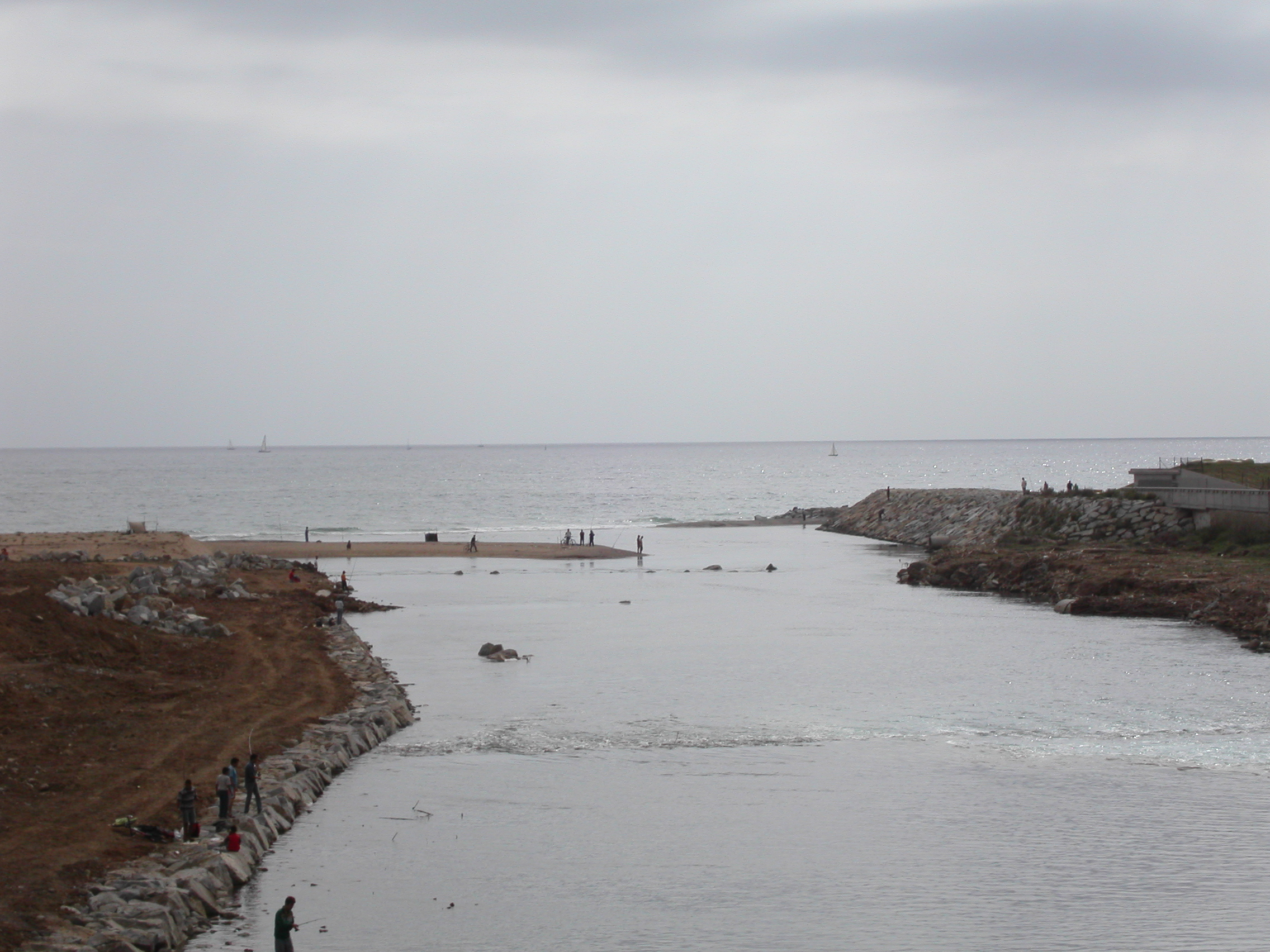
The river mouth

== See also ==
- List of rivers of Spain
- Llobregat
