= La Porxada =

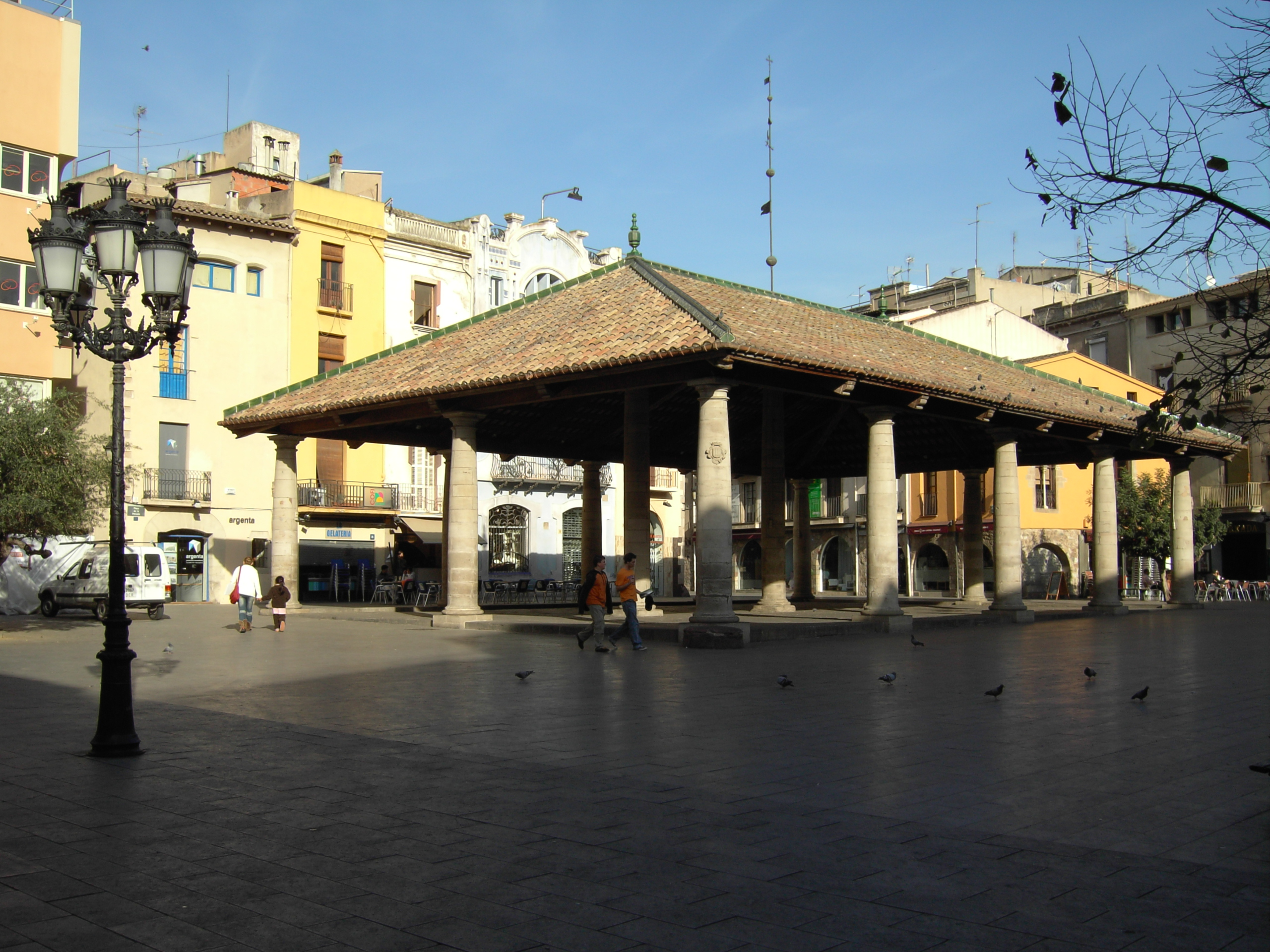
- Interactive map of the La Porxada area
- Etymology: from its open portico or porch-like design

General information
- Type: corn exchange
- Architectural style: Renaissance
- Location: Granollers, Spain
- Coordinates: 41°36′29″N 2°17′15″E
- Construction started: 1586
- Completed: 1587

Dimensions
- Other dimensions: 24 x 15.65 m

Technical details
- Structural system: 15 Tuscan order pillars

Design and construction
- Main contractor: Bartomeu Brufalt
- Designations: artistic and historical monument (MHA), 2006

References
- RI-51-0011586

La Porxada (Catalan pronunciation: [lə purˈʃaðə]) is a 16th-century corn exchange (llotja) in the Catalan town of Granollers, near Barcelona. It was declared to be an official artistic and historical monument (MHA) in 2006.
