= Ildefons Cerdà =

Catalan urban planner and engineer (1815–1876)

Ildefons Cerdà Sunyer
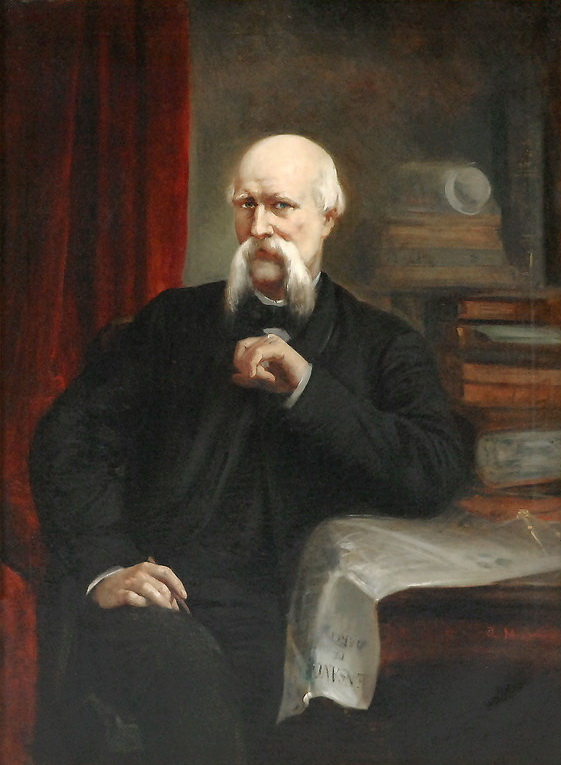
- Portrait by Ramon Martí Alsina, 1878
- Born: 23 December 1815; Centelles, Catalonia, Spain
- Died: 21 August 1876 (aged 60); Las Caldas de Besaya, Los Corrales de Buelna, Cantabria, Spain
- Citizenship: Spain
- Known for: Designed expansion of Barcelona known as the "Eixample"
- Scientific career
- Fields: Urban planner, civil engineer, politician

Ildefons Cerdà Sunyer (Catalan pronunciation: [ildəˈfons səɾˈða i suˈɲe]; Spanish: Ildefonso Cerdá Suñer; 23 December 1815, Centelles (Catalonia) – 21 August 1876, Caldas de Besaya (Cantabria)) was a Spanish urban planner and civil engineer who designed the 19th-century "extension" of Barcelona called the Eixample. Because of his extensive theoretical and practical work, he is considered the founder of modern town planning as a discipline, having coined the word "urbanization".

== Biography ==
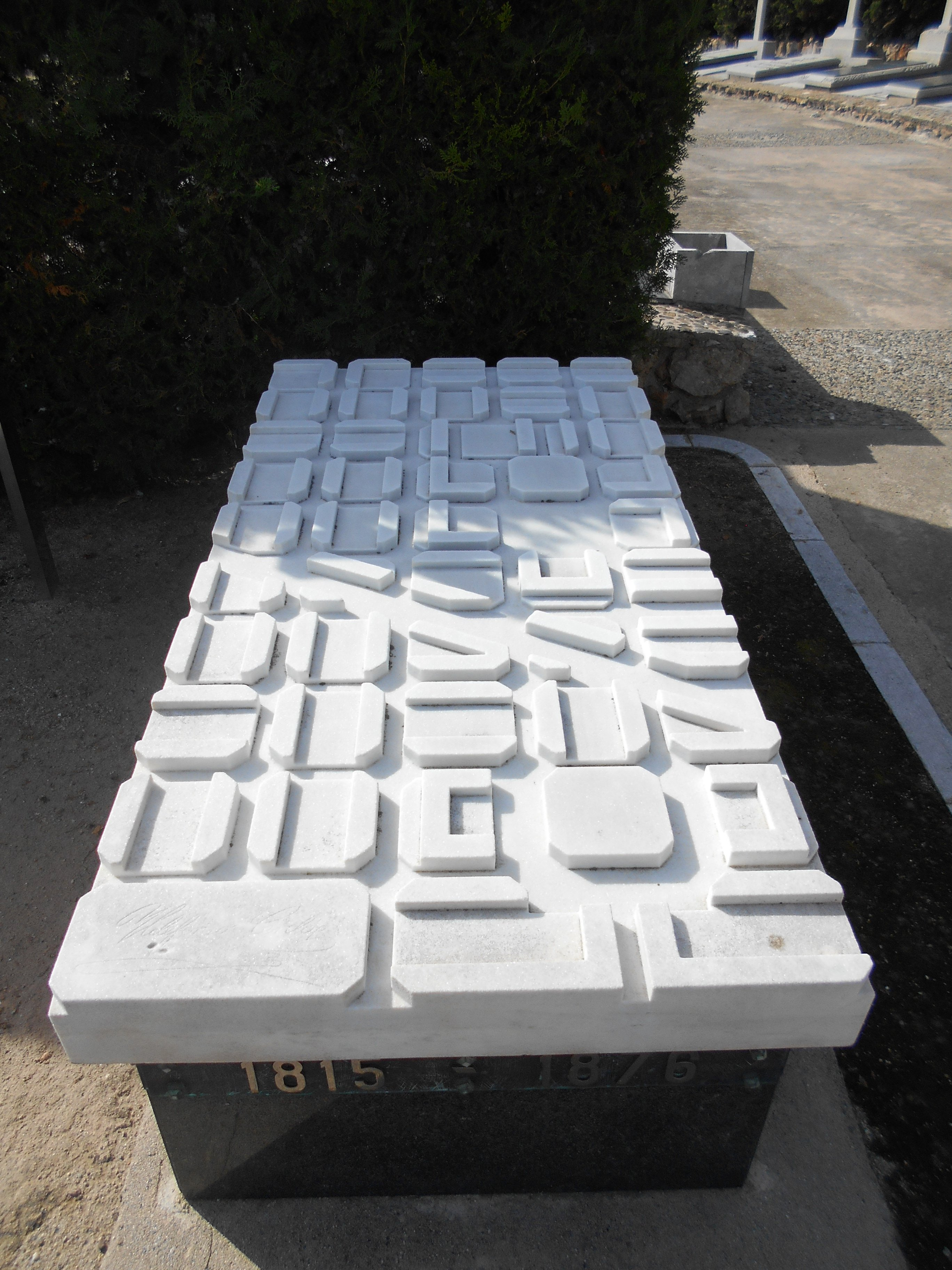
Cerdà's gravestone, modelled on his plan for Eixample in Barcelona

Cerdà was born in Centelles, Catalonia, Spain, in 1815. He trained as a civil engineer at the Escuela de Ingenieros de Caminos, Canales y Puertos, in Madrid. He joined the Corps of Engineers and lived in various cities in Spain before settling in Barcelona in 1848 and marrying Clotilde Bosch. After the death of his brothers, Cerdà inherited the family fortune, and left the civil service. He became interested in politics and the study of urban planning.

When the government of the time finally gave in to public pressure and allowed Barcelona's city walls to be torn down, he realized the need to plan the city's expansion so that the new extension would become an efficient and livable place, unlike the congested, epidemic-prone old town within the walls. When he failed to find suitable reference works, he undertook the task of writing one from scratch while designing what he called the Ensanche or Eixample, borrowing a few technological ideas from his contemporaries to create a unique, thoroughly modern integrated concept that was carefully considered rather than whimsically designed.

He continued to create projects and improve existing designs throughout his lifetime, as well as to develop his theories taking on larger planning scopes (at the regional planning level), until the very end. In the process, he lost all his family's inheritance and he died in 1876 a heavily indebted near-pauper, never having been paid for his chief masterpiece, the design of Barcelona's Eixample.

== Achievements ==
Cerdà was a multi-faceted man who, in pursuit of his vision, gave up a steady job in the civil engineering service, stood for election and became a member of the Cortes (the Spanish Parliament); drafted useful ground-breaking legislation, drew up a detailed topographical survey map of Barcelona's surroundings, and wrote a theoretical treatise to support each of his major planning projects. He actually coined a number of important words in Spanish, including urbanización.

== Approach ==
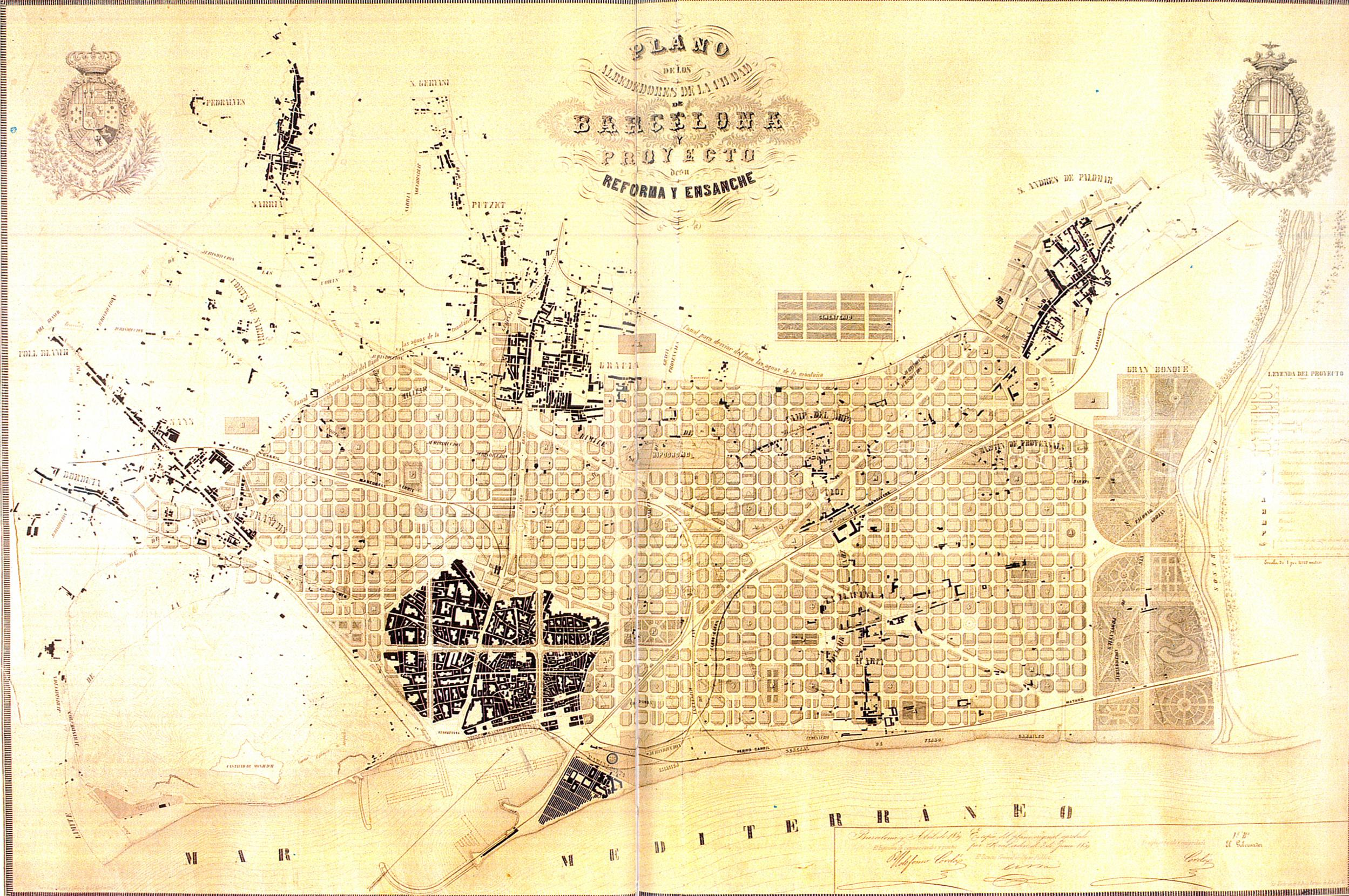
Original plan of the extension of Barcelona (1859)

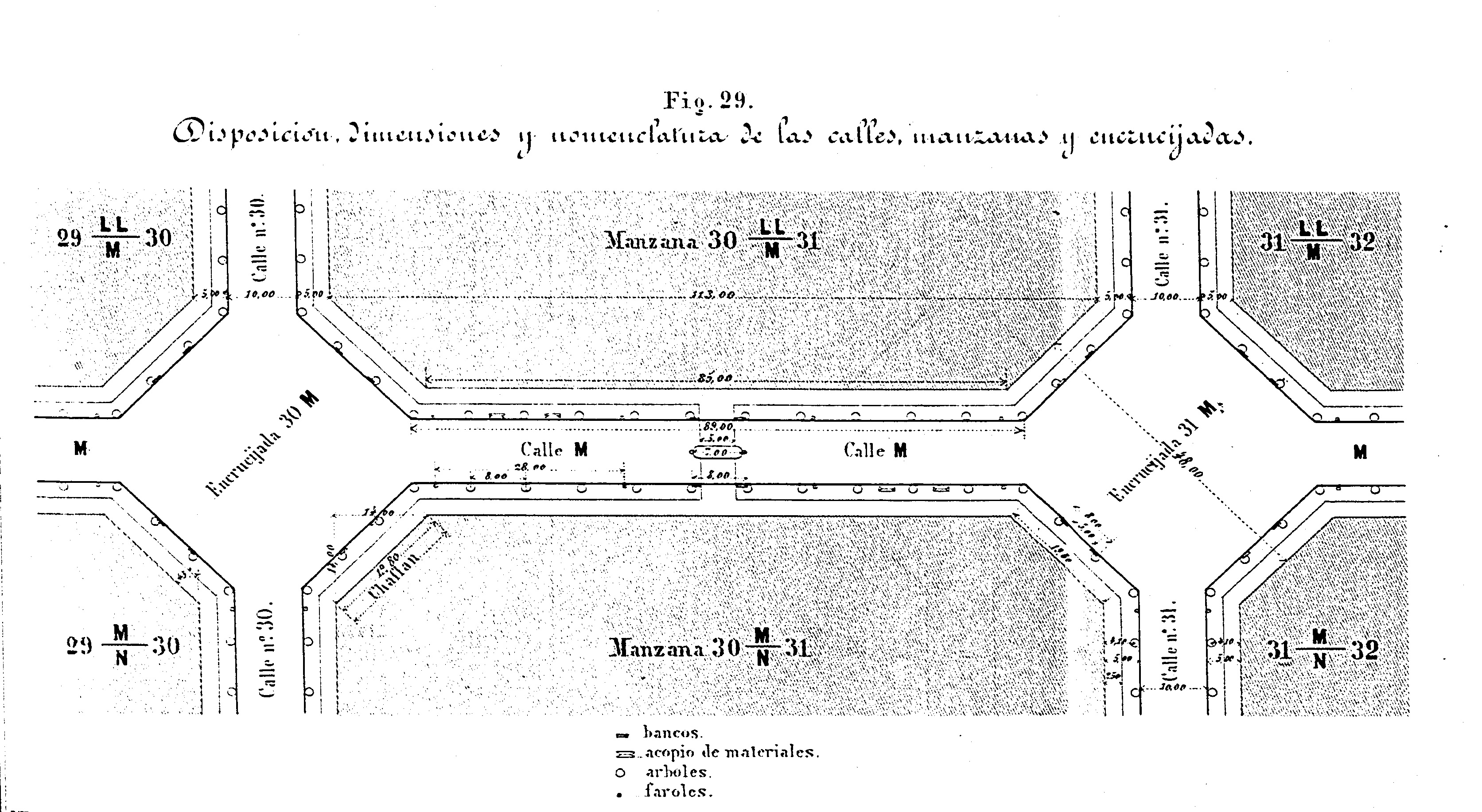
the plan for new barcelona

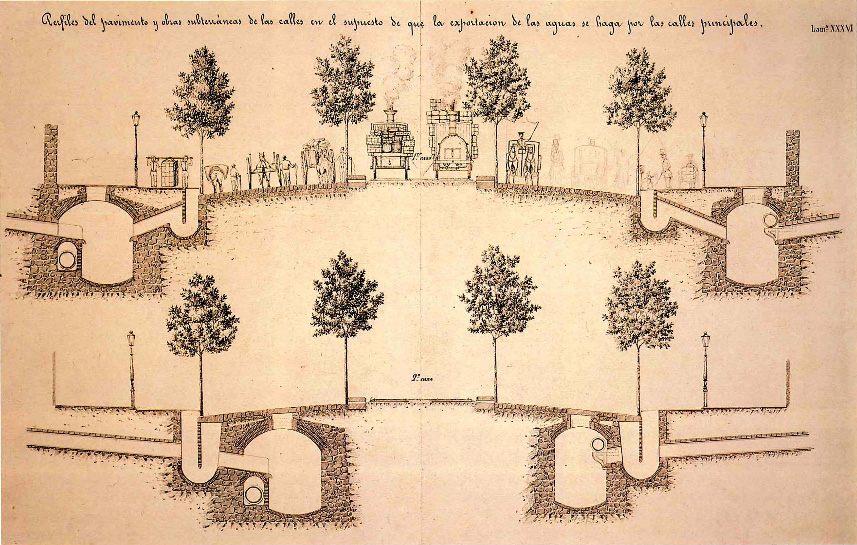
a plan for street

Cerdà focused on key needs: chiefly, the need for sunlight, natural lighting and ventilation in homes (he was heavily influenced by the sanitarian movement), the need for greenery in people's surroundings, the need for effective waste disposal including good sewerage, and the need for seamless movement of people, goods, energy, and information.

His designs belie a network-oriented approach far ahead of his time. His street layout and grid plan were optimized to accommodate pedestrians, carriages, horse-drawn trams, urban railway lines (as yet unheard-of), gas supply and large-capacity sewers to prevent frequent floods, without neglecting public and private gardens and other key amenities. The latest technical innovations were incorporated in his designs if they could further the cause of better integration, but he also came up with remarkable new concepts of his own, including a logical system of land readjustment that was essential to the success of his project, and produced a thorough statistical analysis of working-class conditions at the time, which he undertook in order to demonstrate the ills of congestion.

== Controversy ==
Cerdà's plan for Barcelona underwent two major revisions; the second version, approved by the Spanish government at the time, is the one still recognizable in the layout of today's Eixample, though the low height of buildings and the gardens within every city block were soon dispensed with by politicians inclined toward property speculation. In addition, only one of the two planned diagonal streets was realized. Culturally, the Eixample was (and still is) inhabited by the well-to-do, instead of integrating social classes. Many of the Catalan architects of his time opposed Cerdà's ideas, even accusing him of promoting socialism; in the end, however, they designed the Modernista façades that brought fame to the district.

Political developments in Spain and Catalonia eventually led to the enshrinement of a revisionist version of how Cerdà secured official approval of his plan. Cerdà actually drew up his plan under the commission of the then competent authority, the Spanish central government, with the support of the city council. A political reversal led to a change in local government, and the new council sought to preempt the previous central government's decision by holding a project competition in 1859, which Cerdà lost; nevertheless, Cerdà's design prevailed, much to the chagrin of the major property owners.

== Major works ==
- Teoría de la Construcción de Ciudades ("Theory of City Construction", 1859), written to support his 1855 preliminary project for the Barcelona Extension.
- Teoría de la Viabilidad Urbana y Reforma de la de Madrid ("Theory of Urban Roadspace and Reform of That of Madrid", 1861), to support his inner-city reform designs for the capital of Spain.
- Teoría del Enlace del Movimiento de las Vías Marítimas y Terrestres ("Theory of the Linkage of movement on Landways and Seaways", 1863), to accompany a Preliminary Project for a road-rail-sea intermodal system at the port of Barcelona, evidence of which is conclusive though most of the content has not yet been found.
- Teoría General de la Urbanización ("General Theory of Urbanization", 1867), to support his 1859 project for the Barcelona Extension (digizalization: Volume 1 and Volume 2).
- Teoría General de la Rurización ("General Theory of Ruralization")

== See also ==
- Urban planning of Barcelona
