= Jordi Benito =

Catalan artist (1951–2008)

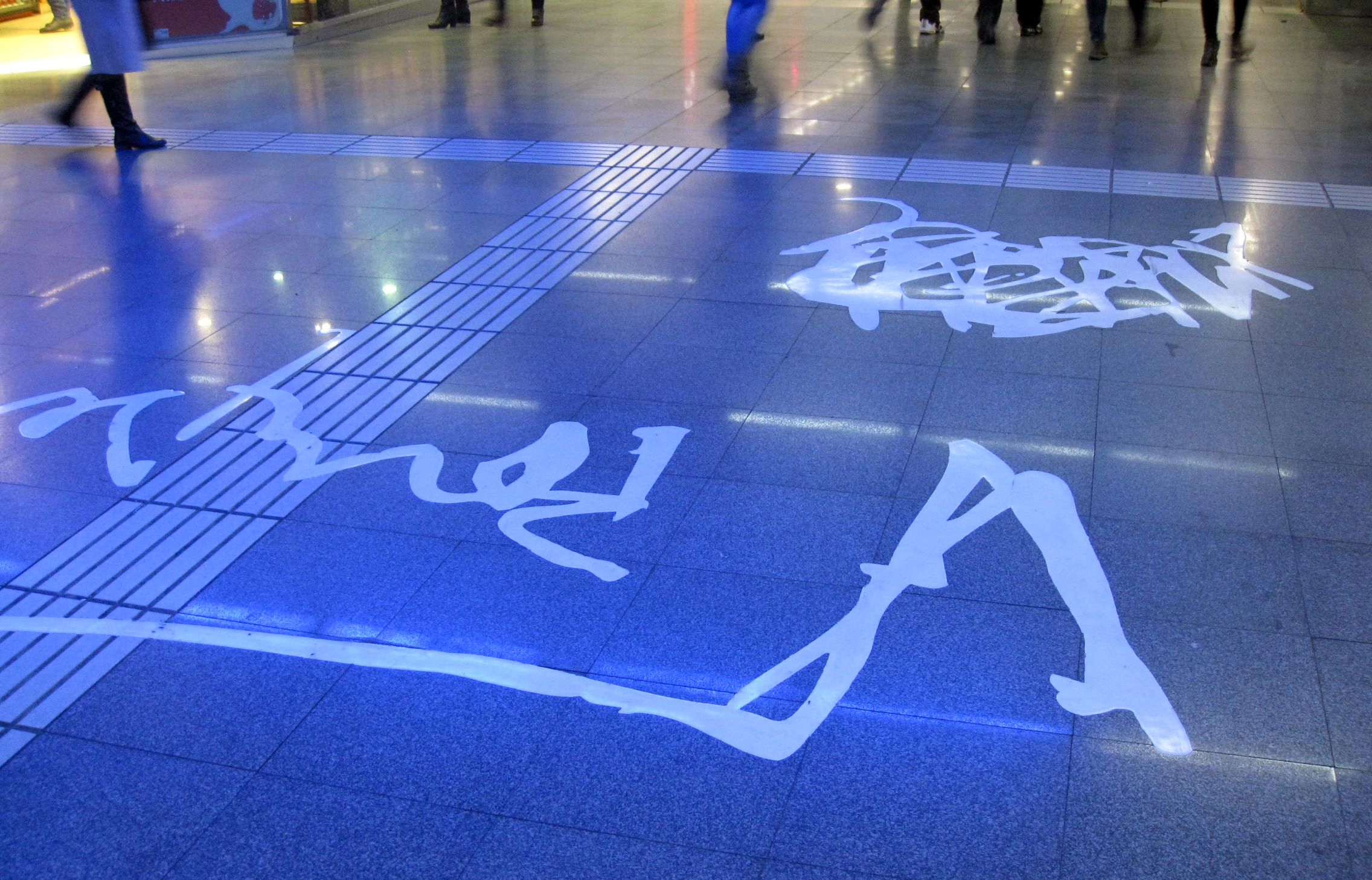
Installation by Jordi Benito at Barcelona Public Transport

Jordi Benito i Verdaguer (1951, in Granollers – December 9, 2008 in Barcelona) was a Catalan artist. He is known as an artist for his actions, installations and performances of a radical and unparalleled savagery that developed especially during the 70s and 80s. However, he also conducted a side task a designer, interior designer and furniture maker who, in collaboration with artisans, served following the family tradition, as his father was a cabinetmaker.
