= Congost (river) =

River in Spain

Congost River
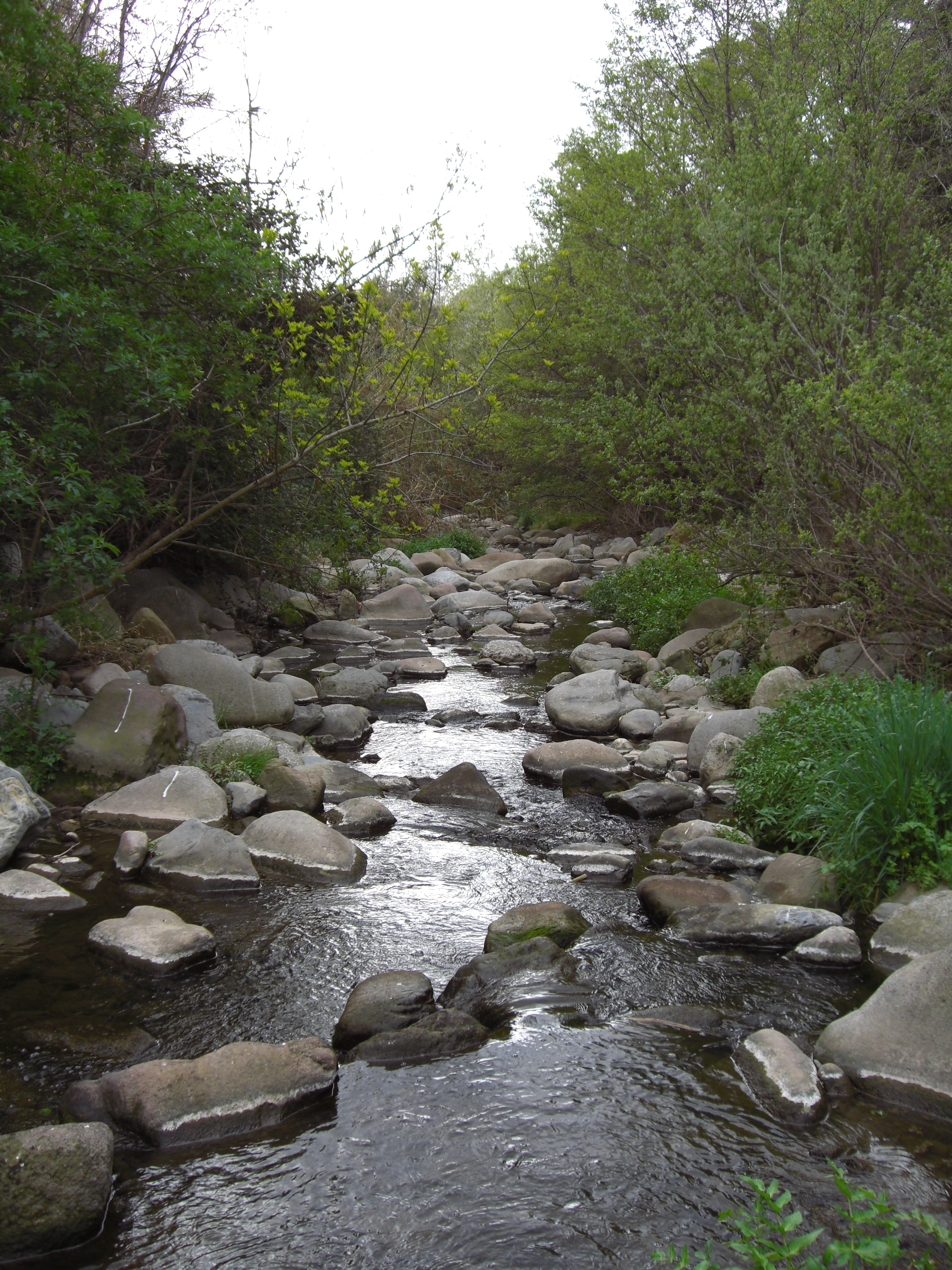
- Congost river through la Garriga

Location
- Country: Spain
- Cities: Collsuspina, Centelles, la Garriga, Granollers, Montmeló

Physical characteristics
- Source: Waters of the western cliffs of the Plain of Vic
  - location: Collsuspina, Osona, Catalonia, Spain
  - coordinates: 41°49′38.21″N 2°11′42.72″E
  - elevation: 3,307 ft (1,008 m)
- Mouth: Besòs River
  - location: Montmeló, Vallès Oriental, Catalonia, Spain
  - coordinates: 41°32′46.82″N 2°15′3.38″E
  - elevation: 236 ft (72 m)
- Length: 41 km (25 mi)
- Basin size: 225 km^{2} (87 sq mi)

The Congost (Catalan pronunciation: [kuŋˈgost]) is a river basin of the Besòs river and owes its name to the narrow gorge through which it passes, largely through the Catalan pre-coastal mountain range in Spain.

== Geography ==
The Congost River is born of the waters of the western cliffs of the Plain of Vic, at the foot of Sant Cugat Gavadons in land consisting of sandstone and marl.

== Middle and mouth ==
The river is in the gap that separates the massif of Montseny from the Cliffs of Bertí separating these two mountainous units north to south. Its action for centuries has achieved a major gorge that begins at Gorg Negre, near Centelles, and continues to Aiguafreda and Figueró to open on the plain of Vallès when it comes to la Garriga. After that it crosses the plains of Vallès, Granollers through, and finally forms Besòs at its confluence with the Mogent, at the height of Montmeló. No major tributaries, but many of them are also gorges.
