= Llotja =

Medieval commercial buildings

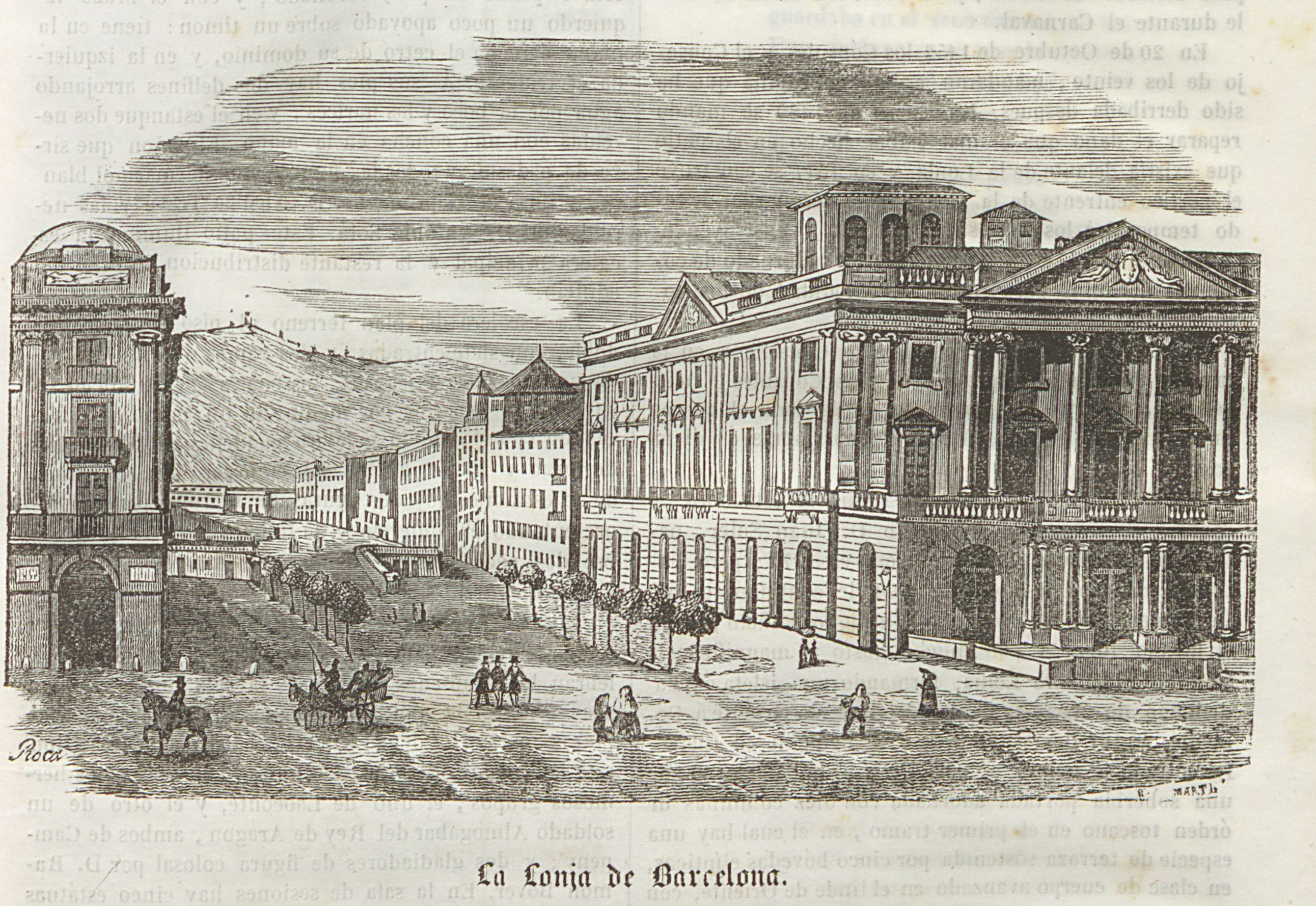
The Llotja de Mar

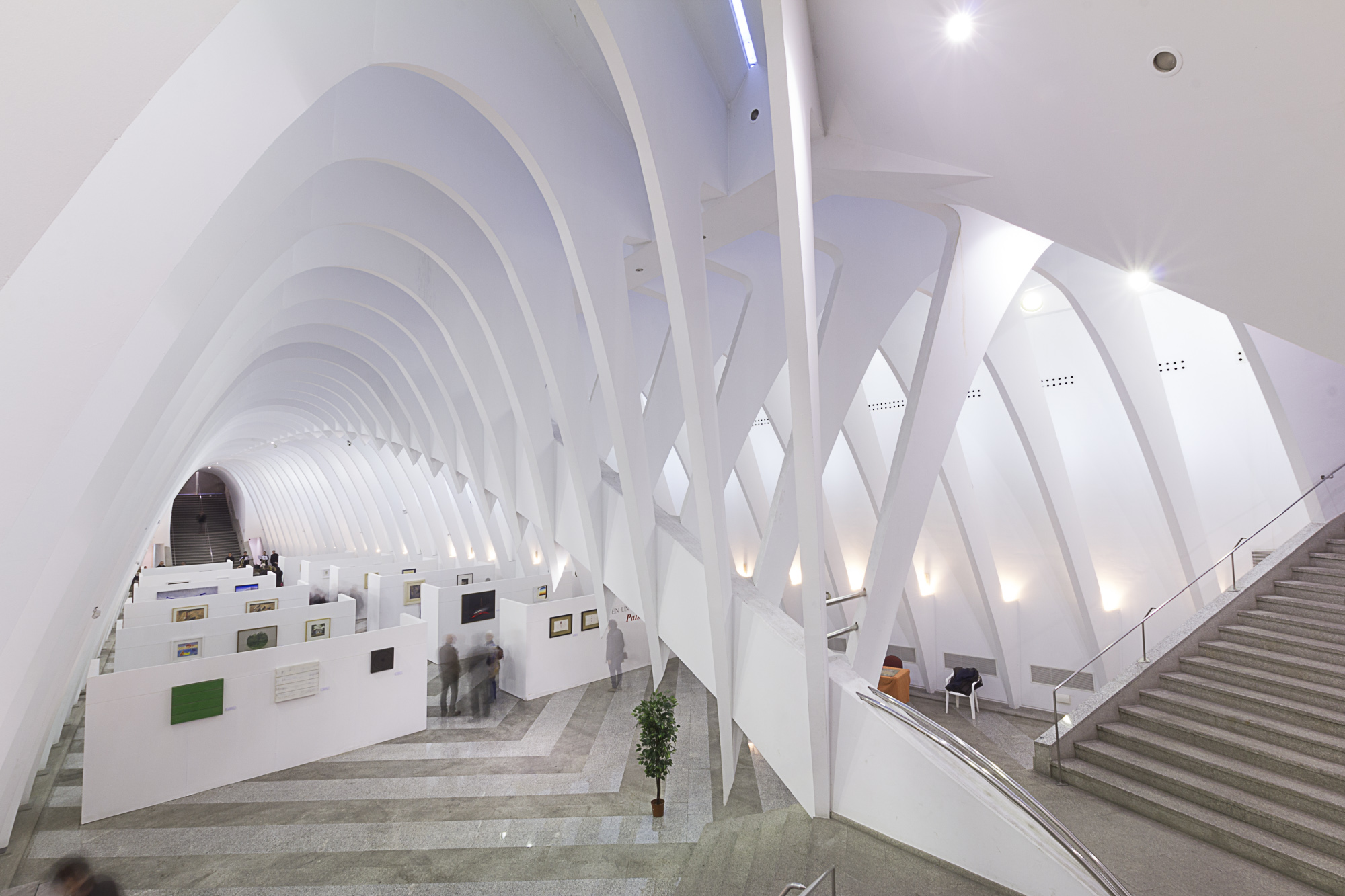
The Llotja de Sant Jordi

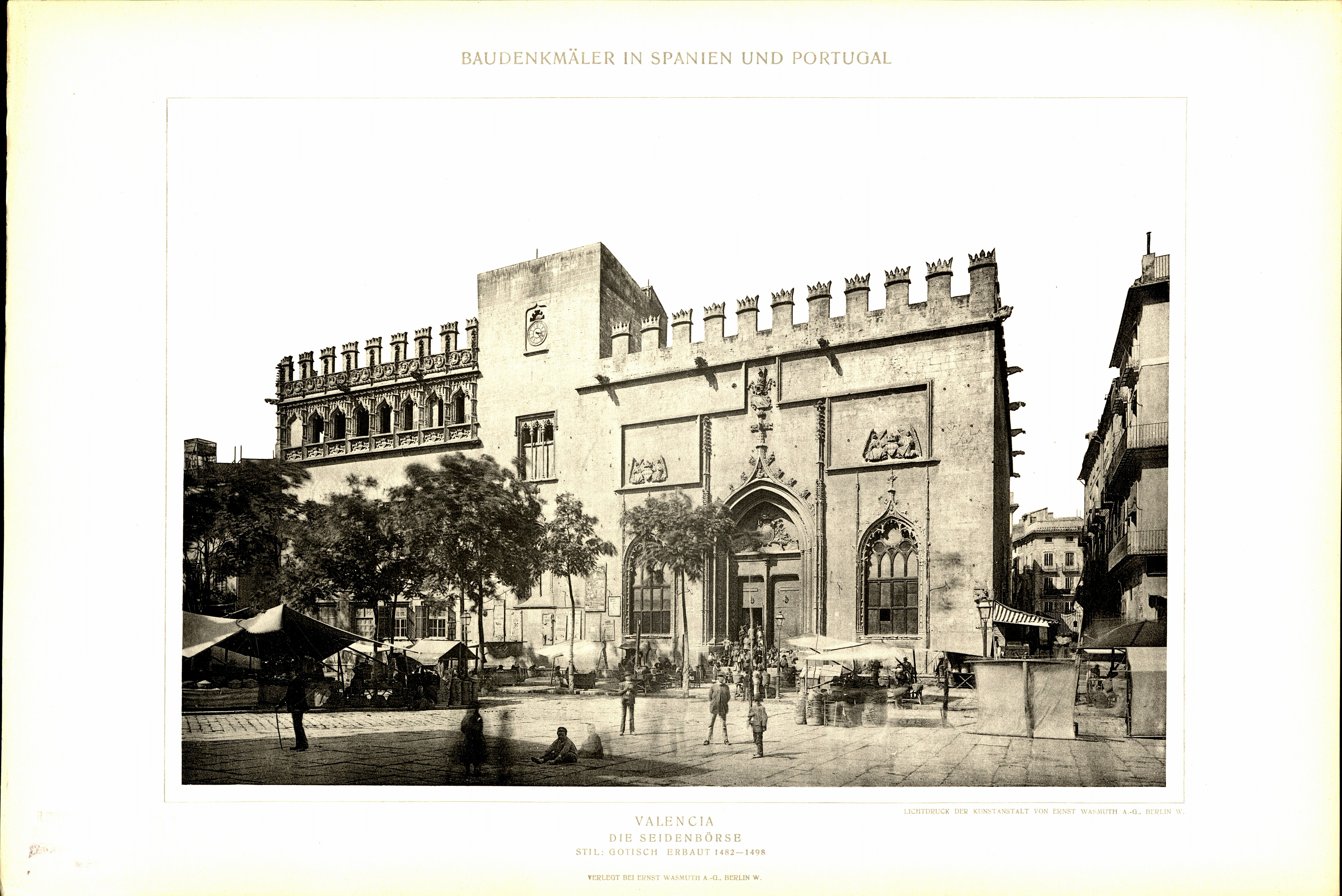
The Llotja de la Seda, Valencia

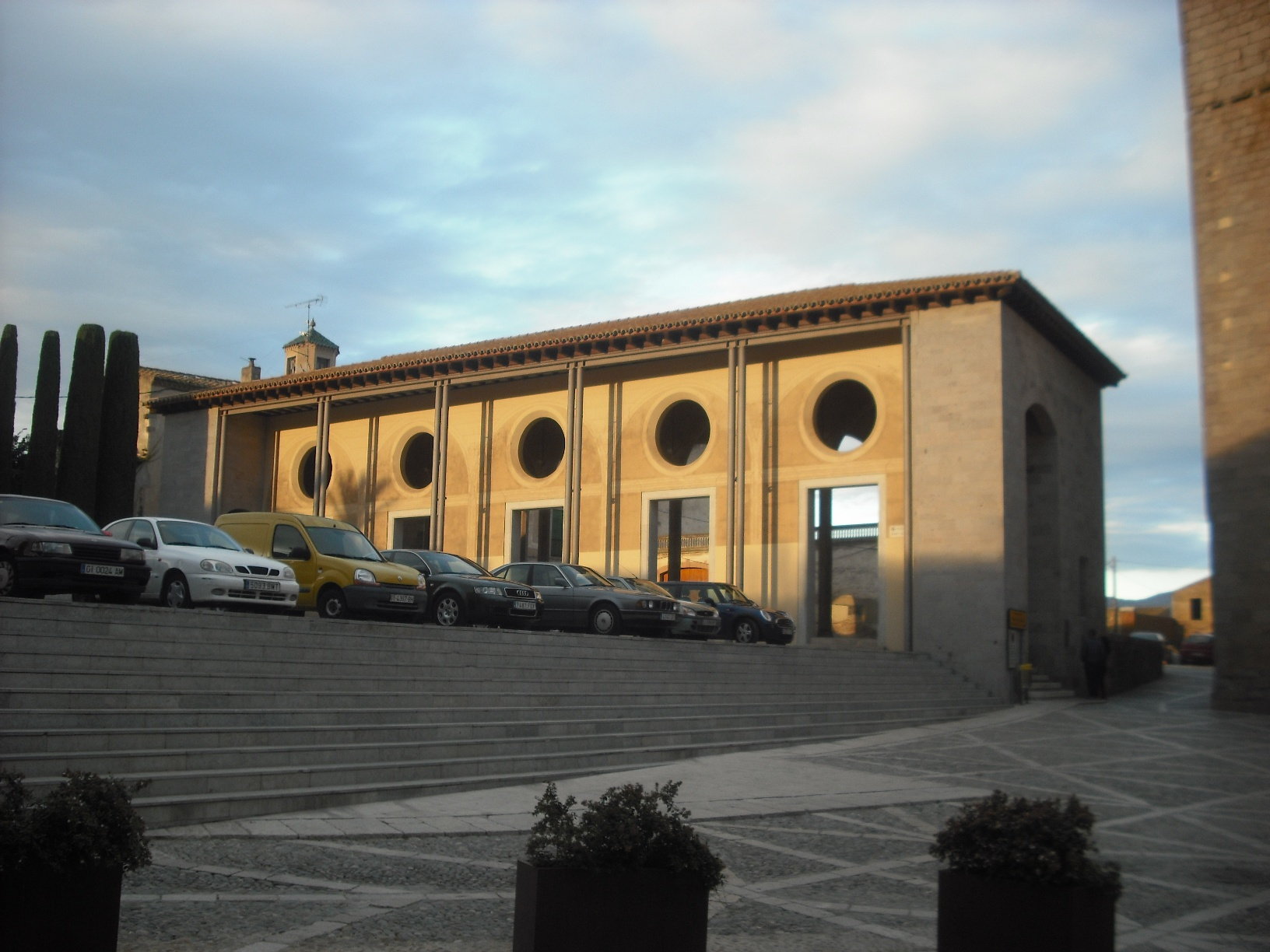
The Llotja de Castelló d'Empúries

Llotja (Eastern Catalan: [ˈʎɔdʒə], plural llotjes); in Aragonese: loncha; in Spanish: lonja; is a Catalan term for important buildings used for commercial purposes during the Middle Ages and Early Modern Ages. Loggia and lodge are cognates.

Many were used during the Medieval Ages for fishing and livestock markets or by brokers who used to make intermediaries.

== Llotges in the former Crown of Aragon ==
In Catalonia

- Llotja de Barcelona or Llotja de Mar, (1352–1397) (enclosed and renovated in 1772–1802).
- Llotja de Castelló d'Empúries (built in 1393).
- Llotja de Tortosa (1368–1373).
- La Porxada (1587) in Granollers.

In Aragon

- Loncha de Sos del Rey Católico (built around late-Medieval Ages and Early Modern Ages).
- Loncha de Alcañiz (15th century).
- Loncha de Zaragoza (1541–1551).
- Casa Consistorial de Tarazona (1563), formerly a llotja, since the mid-17th century the Town Hall.

In the Valencian Community

- Llotja de Valencia, also called Llotja de la Seda (1482-1533). It is a UNESCO World Heritage Site.
- Town Hall of Ares del Maestrat (1295-1318), a former llotja, now the Town Hall.
- Llotja del Cànem (17th century) in Castellón de la Plana.

In the Balearic Islands

- Llotja de Palma or Sa Llotja, (1420–1452).

Currently in France

- Loge de Perpignan (14th–16th centuries).

== Lonjas in the rest of Spain ==
- Las Covachas or Tiendas de las Sierpes (15th century) in Sanlúcar de Barrameda.
- Lonja de San Felipe or Las gradas de San Felipe (16th century), now demolished, was in Madrid.
- Antigua Lonja (18th century) in El Puerto de Santa María.
- Casa Lonja de Alzola (17th century) in Elgoibar.

== Casa de Contratación de Indias ==
The Casa de Contratación de Indias centralized all of trade of the Americas with Spain from 1503 to 1790, including all types of products. Its headquarters were:

- Seville Dockyards (building built in 13th century), was the first seat for the Casa de Contratación de Indias.
- General Archive of the Indies (building built in 1584-1598) in Seville, was the most important seat for the Casa de Contratación de Indias.
- Alcázar of Seville (building built from 9th until 18th centuries), was other seat for the Casa de Contratación de Indias.
- Casa Palacio del Marqués de Torresoto (building built in 17th-18th centuries) in Cádiz, was the last seat for the Casa de Contratación de Indias.
