= Centelles =

- Municipality
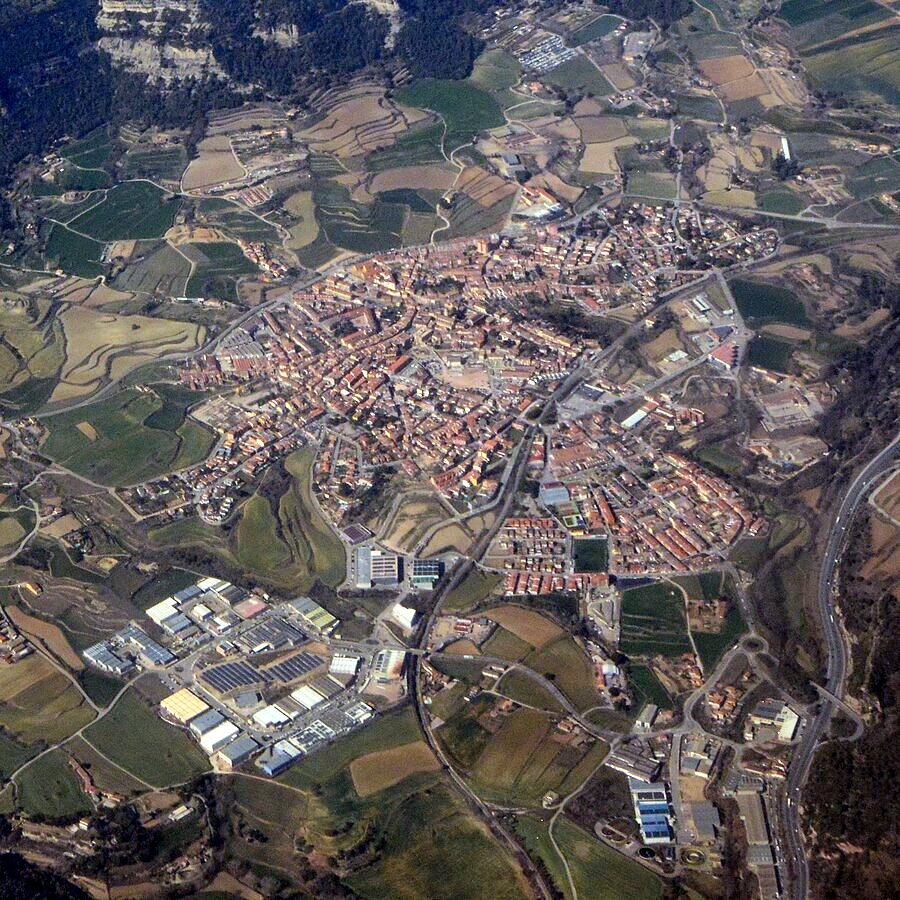

- Coat of arms

- Location in Catalonia Centelles (Spain)
- Coordinates: 41°47′58″N 2°13′18″E
- Country: Spain
- Community: Catalonia
- Province: Barcelona
- Comarca: Osona

Government
  - Mayor: Miquel Arisa Coma (2015)

Area
  - Total: 15.2 km^{2} (5.9 sq mi)
- Elevation: 496 m (1,627 ft)

Population (2025-01-01)
  - Total: 7,864
  - Density: 517/km^{2} (1,340/sq mi)
- Demonym: Centellenc
- Postal code: 08540
- Website: www.centelles.cat

Centelles (Catalan pronunciation: [sənˈtɛʎəs]; locally [sənˈtɛjəs]) is a municipality in the comarca of Osona in Catalonia, Spain. It is situated in the upper valley of the Congost River in the south of the comarca. The municipality is served by the C-17 road. The renowned urban planner Ildefons Cerdà was born here.

== Main sights ==
- Chapel of Jesus (16th century)
- Chapel of the Rescue (16th century)
- City Portal (1542), the ancient entrance to the town
- Counts' Palace Palau (16th century). It houses a Palaeontology museum.
- Hermitage of Sant Antoni de les Codines
- Parish church of Santa Coloma (1704–1710). The bell tower is from 1682.

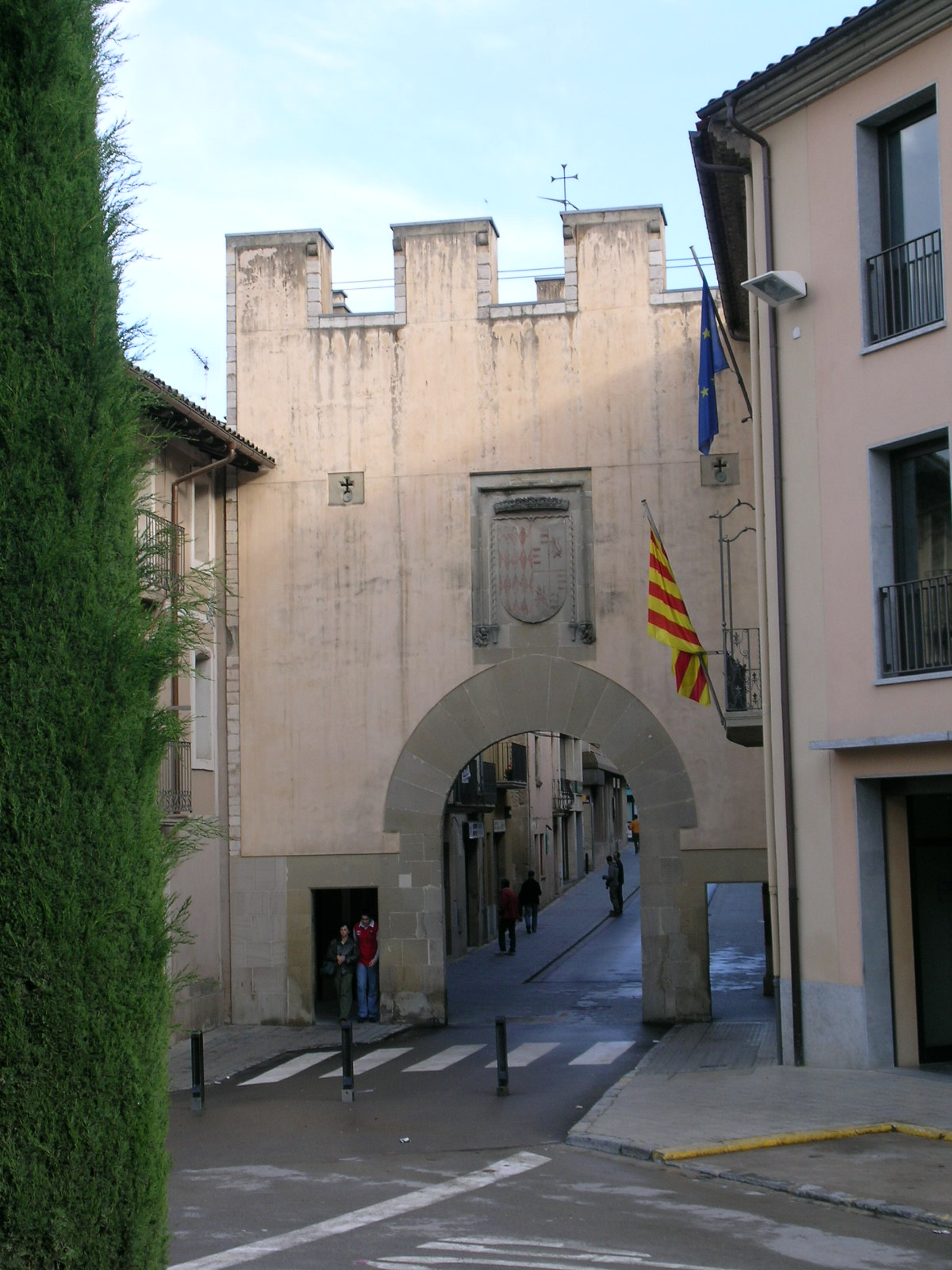
Portal de Centelles
