= Dolors Lamarca =

Catalan librarian and philologist (1943–2026)

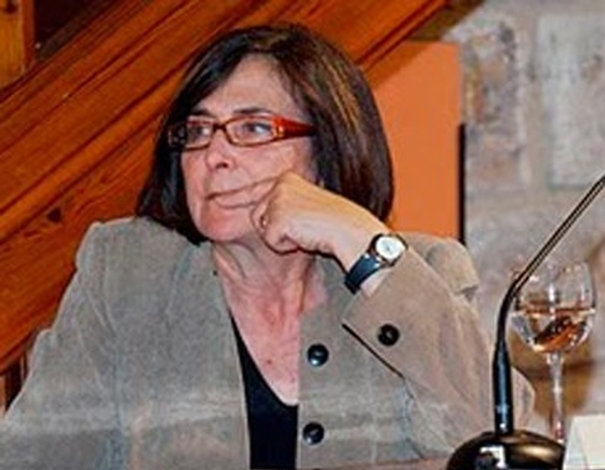
- Born: 19 October 1943; Granollers, Catalonia, Spain
- Died: 25 March 2026 (aged 82); Barcelona, Catalonia, Spain
- Education: University of Barcelona
- Occupations: Librarian, philologist
- Spouse: Antoni Comas i Pujol (d. 1981)
- Children: 3

Dolors Lamarca y Morell (19 October 1943 – 25 March 2026) was a Catalan librarian and philologist. She led the Service of Libraries and Bibliographic Heritage of the Generalitat de Catalunya, and directed the National Library of Catalonia. She was the wife of Antoni Comas i Pujol, with whom she had three daughters.

== Life and career ==
Lamarca studied Classical Philology at the University of Barcelona, and library science at the School of Bibliology. On 5 November 1974, she joined the faculty of Archivers, Librarians and Archaeologists (Library Section) at the University of Barcelona.

She led the "Library and Bibliographic Heritage Service" of the Generalitat de Catalunya from 1 August 1980, until 2 March 1983. During these years, she established the foundations of the current Catalan library system, adapting cataloging regulations through the Catalan Institute of Bibliography and opening new libraries to provide more service to the public. Later, she was director of the Library of the University of Barcelona (1984-2000), achieving important milestones at the head of this network of libraries, such as the modernization of structures and buildings, adding full computerization.

On 12 February 2004, she became director of the National Library of Catalonia, a position she held until June 2012. During these seven years, she managed a fund of great bibliographic and documentary value made up of more than three million documents in different types of media. In an era where the information society is so important, the Library launched different digitization projects of its heritage fund to allow heritage diffusion at a global level for the Library of Catalonia, and of everything that is published in Catalonia, thus preserving all of its contents at the same time. Under the motto "open, reliable and useful", she modernized the BC by purchasing new equipment, improving internal processes. Under her direction, numerous musical, literary or graphic heritage funds were acquired.

Lamarca died from pneumonia on 25 March 2026, at the age of 82.

== Selected works ==
- Albéniz, Isaac; Granados, Enric; Lamarca, Dolors (2010). Azulejos (in Catalan). Barcelona: Biblioteca de Catalunya : Museu de la Música. ISMN 9790901314849.
- Lamarca, Dolors; Serra Aranda, Eugènia (2007). "Deu pinzellades de la història recent de la Biblioteca de Catalunya (1993-2007)" [Ten sketches of the recent history of the Library of Catalonia (1993-2007)] (PDF). Item. Revista de biblioteconomia i documentació. Ejemplar (in Catalan) (46): 35–51.
