= Jaime Serra =

Jaime Serra may refer to:

- Jaime Serra (politician) (1921–2022), Portuguese politician
- Jaime Serra Puche (born 1955), Mexican economist and politician
- Jaime Serra Palou (born 1964), Catalan artist and journalist
- Jaime Arbós Serra (born1952), Spanish former field hockey player

== See also ==
- Jaume Serra, several people
