= Antoni Comas i Pujol =

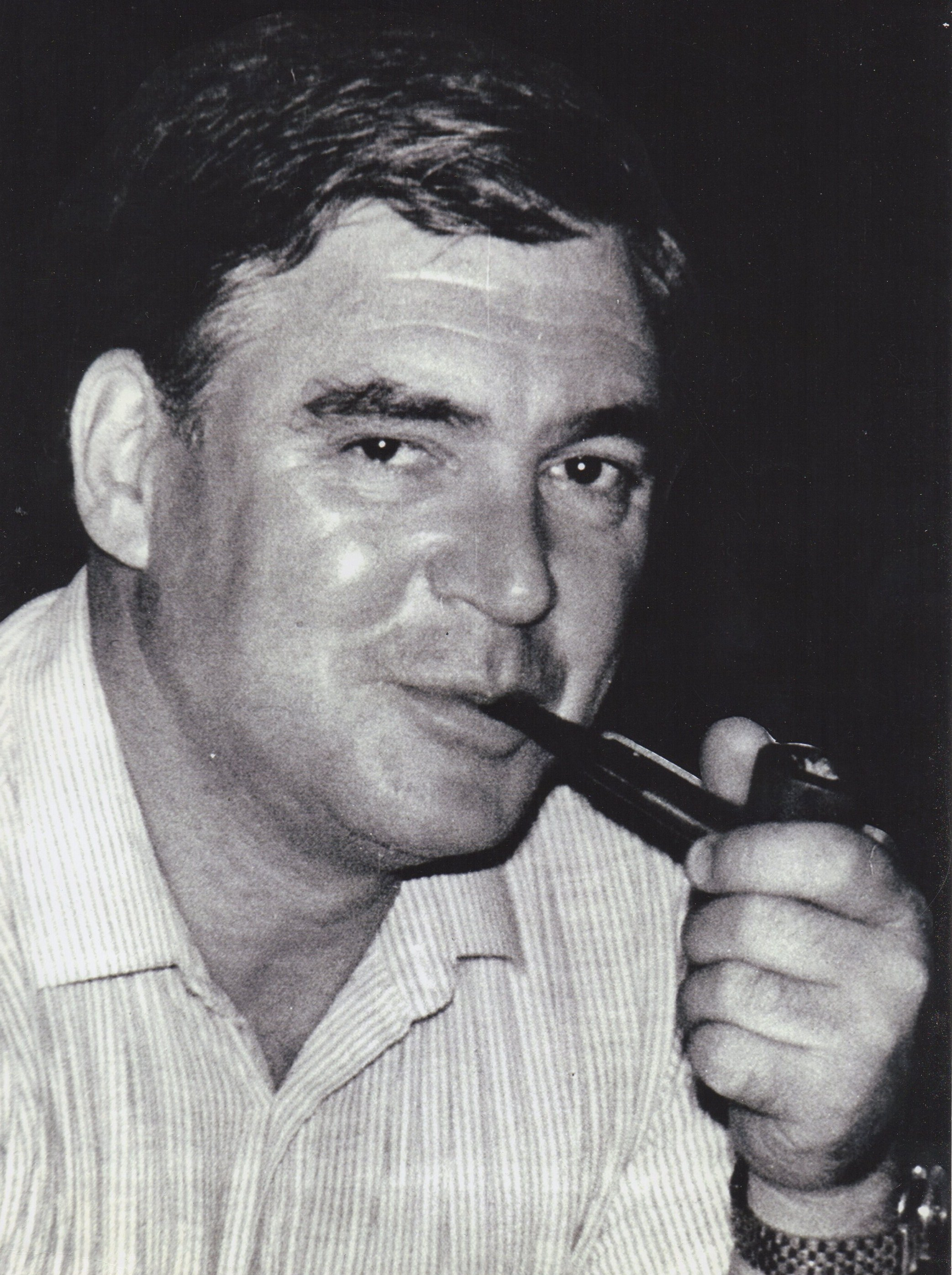

Antoni Comas i Pujol (January 3, 1931, in Mataró – March 24, 1981, in Barcelona) was a literary historian and literary critic, member of the Institut d'Estudis Catalans and elected member of the Acadèmia de Bones Lletres. He married Dolors Lamarca with whom he had three daughters.

== Childhood and youth. Education ==
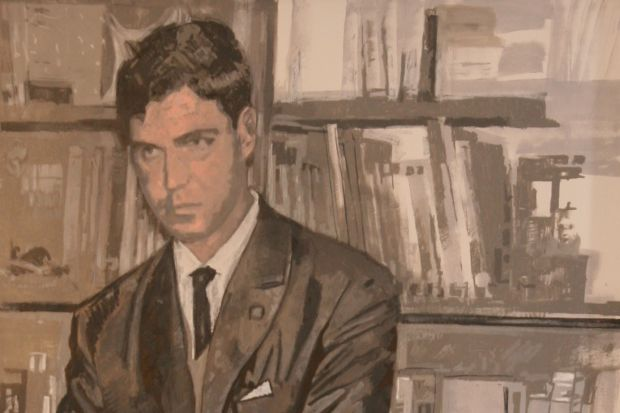
Portrait of Antoni Comas in the Gallery of Illustrious Mataronins by Eduard Novellas

The most extensive information about his formative stage during childhood and youth was provided by Antoni Comas himself in the two autobiographical prologues to individual historical monographs on the Mataronian society. Born into a workers family with deep Christian convictions, he was a student at the Escola Pia in his city where he found the stimulus to learn, and, despite Franco's regime, a respectful look towards Catalan culture and language. In the field of non-formal education and leisure, its active participation in the Foment Mataroní and the Lluïsos should be highlighted. Two entities linked to the parish of Santa Maria de Mataró where young people with cultural and civic concerns gathered. The Popular Library, located right in the same square as his school, which was directed by Claudi Mayol and the librarian Pilar Cuadrada, also played a prominent role in his education. About that period, Antoni Comas used to comment, "I read many, many works of Catalan and foreign literature, not only with delight, but with avidity".

In 1948 he entered the University of Barcelona as a student of Philosophy and Letters. Antoni M. Badia i Margarit, Joan Petit and, especially, Martí de Riquer stand out among his teachers. He was also a student of the clandestine Catalan University Studies led by Jordi Rubió and Ramon Aramon. During the first years of university, he was one of the young promoters of the university magazine Curial - cyclostyled and also clandestine -, with six issues appeared between 1949 and 1950, before being banned and the printers fined. He graduated, in 1953, in Romance Philology with an "Extraordinary Award.

== University researcher and professor ==
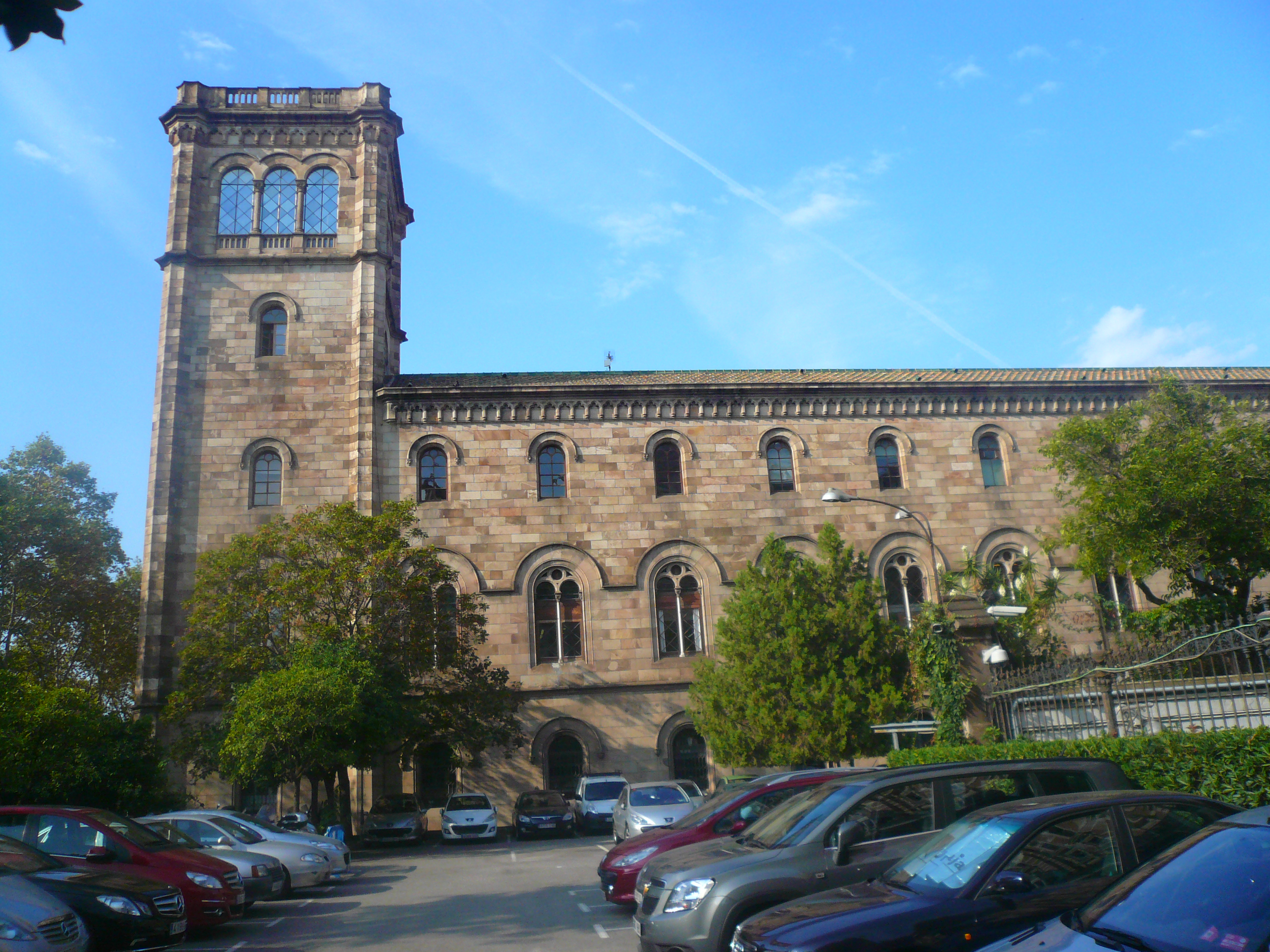
University of Barcelona where Antoni Comas studied and taught

After obtaining his degree, Antoni Comas began teaching at his faculty while preparing his doctorate, which he obtained in 1953 with a thesis on the work of the troubadour Ramon Vidal de Besalú. During the 1960–1961 academic year, being an interim professor in the Romance Philology section, he began regular teaching of the Catalan language at the University of Barcelona under Franco's regime. Finally, in 1965, Antoni Comas won the concours for the Catalan Language and Literature chair reinstated 25 years after its suppression by Franco at the end of the Civil War.

As professor and later as director of the Department of Catalan Philology, Comas i Pujol worked to give continuity to Catalan culture and language above the policies of Franco's regime while linking contemporary efforts and initiatives with those carried out by previous generations in the line defended by Carles Riba or Salvador Espriu. Also from the only university in Catalonia and the Balearic Islands at that time, he understood the teaching and research of Catalan language and its literature as a useful tool to return and promote its native language to Catalan society. There are numerous testimonies of the academic and human quality of his teaching work and of his positive influence on his students. Such as that of Jordi Llovet in his book Els mestres. Un homenatge shows how Antoni Comas alongside Batllori, Blecua Teixeiro, Valverde and Riquer were decisive in shaping him as a person and as an intellectual.

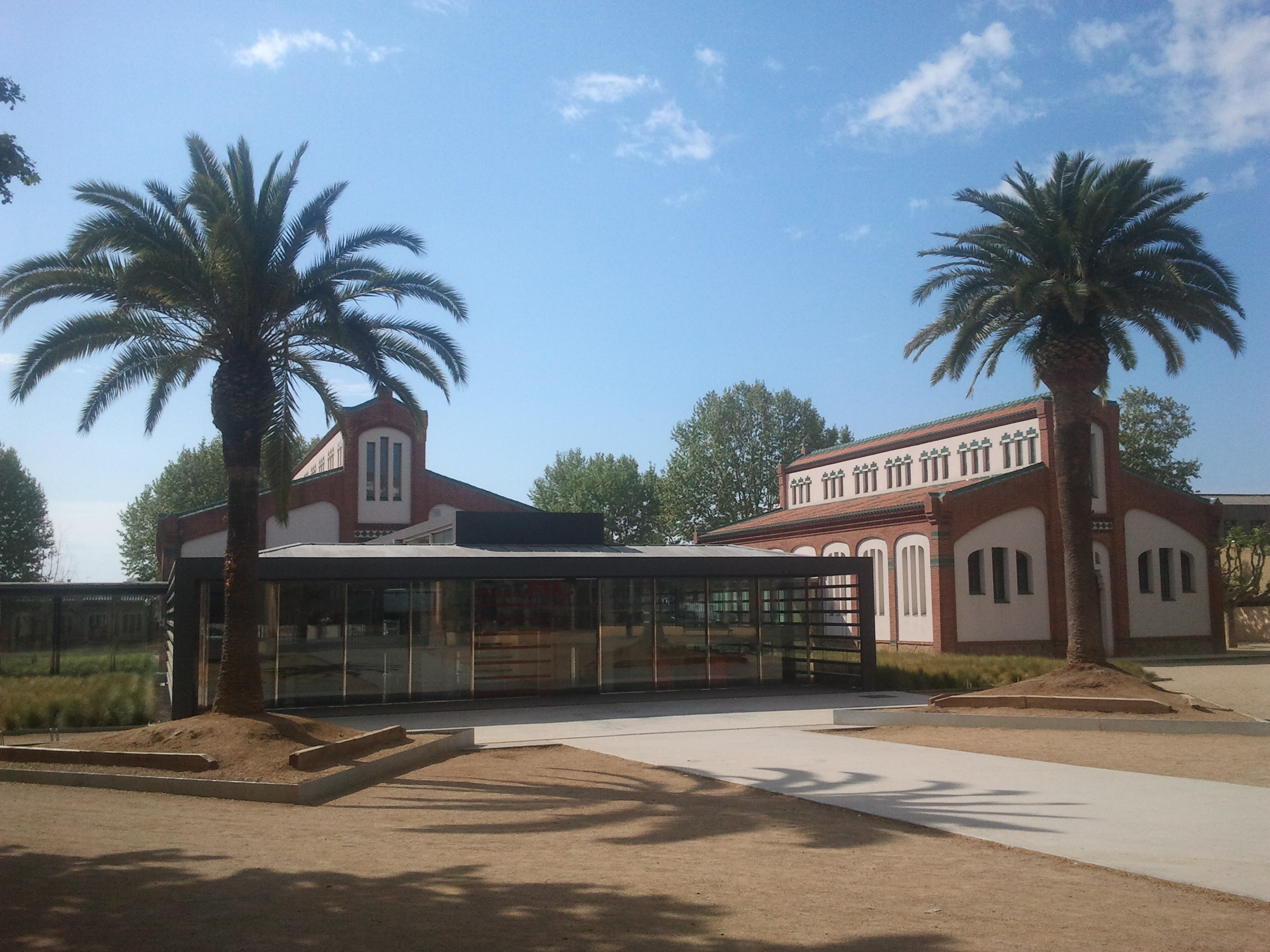
Antoni Comas Public Library, in the Jardí de l'Escorxador in Mataró

His research work on Catalan literature was very wide, ranging from the medieval period to contemporary authors. Among these works, it is worth highlighting his research between the end of the War of Succession, in 1714, until the Peninsular War. Which will overturn the vision of the period of decadence of Catalan literature that had been transmitted by certain historiography. Showing the continuity in the use and cultivation of the Catalan language and relativizing the break that had been caused by the so-called Decadence of the 16th and 17th centuries. All linking the 18th century with the regenerating period of the Renaixença. Highlighting the role of certain institutions in the restoration of culture and language at the end of the 18th century. Also the continuity shown through popular literature in the various Catalan-speaking lands. This study was awarded with the Nicolau i d'Olwer prize from the Institut d'Estudis Catalans and was integrated into the fourth volume of the History of Catalan literature that Martí de Riquer had started with the three volumes dedicated to the medieval period and published since 1964. Antoni Comas continued it with a fourth volume in 1972 on the modern era and, finally, Joaquim Molas concluded it between 1986 and 1988 up to contemporaneity. In February 2013, the second municipal library in Mataró was inaugurated, which bears his name: Biblioteca Antoni Comas.

He was interested in outstanding figures of Castilian literature such as Teresa de Jesús, Joan Boscà or Góngora carrying out critical editions. Through his publications, he also took special care in the dissemination and popularization of Catalan literature at school and social spheres.

== Work (selection) ==
- Història de Literatura Catalana. Barcelona: Ariel, 1980–1981. Segona edició corregida. En col·laboració amb Martí de Riquer.
- Estudis de literatura catalana (segles XVI-XVIII). Barcelona: Universitat de Barcelona/Curial Edicions Catalans, 1985, p. 40-62.
- La Decadència. Barcelona: Dopesa, 1978.
- “La cultura catalana en la época del Barroco” a Ramón Menéndez Pidal, Historia de la Cultura Española: El Siglo del Qujote (1580-1680). Vol. II, Madrid: Espasa-Calpe, 1996, p. 513-574.
- Estudis de literatura catalana (s. XVI-XVIII). Barcelona: Universitat de Barcelona- Curial, 1985.
- “La literatura catalana del Barroc” a El Barroc català. Actes dels Jornades celebrades a Girona els dies 17, 18 i 19 de desembre de 1987. Barcelona: Quaderns Crema, 1989, p. 507-511
- "Pròleg" a Salas i Oliveras, Ramon (1977). Presència mataronina al Río de la Plata a les darreries del segle XVIII i primera meitat del XIX. Mataró: Caixa d'Estalvis Laietana.
- "Pròleg" a Martí i Coll, Antoni (1979). Història d'una família (segona part). Mataró: Caixa d'Estalvis Laietana.
- "Un escriptor místic català del segle XVII: fra Antoni de Sant Maties" a Boletín de la Real Academia de Buenas Letras de Barcelona, núm 38, 1982 p. 5-58.
- “Estudio preliminar, notas y bibliografía” a Teresa de Jesús, Moradas del castillo interior. Barcelona: Bruguera, 1969.
- Obras poeticas de Juan Boscan.. Barcelona: Cátedra Ciudad de Barcelona, 1957. (En col·laboració amb M.de Riquer i J. Molas).
- Góngora: su tiempo y su obra: estudio especial del Polifemo / Antonio. Barcelona: Teide, 1960. (En col·laboració amb Joan Reglà).

== Bibliography ==
- Antoni Comas i Pujol (1931-1981). Ara que fa vint-i-cinc anys. Mataró-Barcelona: Alta Fulla, 2006.
- «Antoni Comas i Pujol». Diccionari d'historiografia catalana.
- Bover Font, August «Antoni Comas i Pujol, mestratge i compromís». Fulls del Museu Arxiu de Santa Maria, núm. 100, 2011, pàg. 2 - 6
- Comas Lamarca, Mercè Del seu afm. Espriu: correspondència de Salvador Espriu amb Antoni Comas. Barcelona: Publicacions de l'Abadia de Montserrat, 2007.
- Domingo i Clua Josep M. «Antoni Comas i Curial», a Serra d’Or, núm. 262–263. 1981, p. 473-475
- Homenatge a Antoni Comas: Miscel·lània in memoriam. Barcelona: Facultat de Filologia, Universitat de Barcelona, 1985.
- Lovet, Jordi. Els mestres. Un homenatge. Barcelona: Galàxia Gutemberg, 2020.
- Pera, Albert. Homenatge a Antoni Comas, amb motiu del 25è aniversari de la seva mort. Mataró:Ajuntament de Mataró, 2006.
