= Jaime Serra Palou =

- Jaime Serra
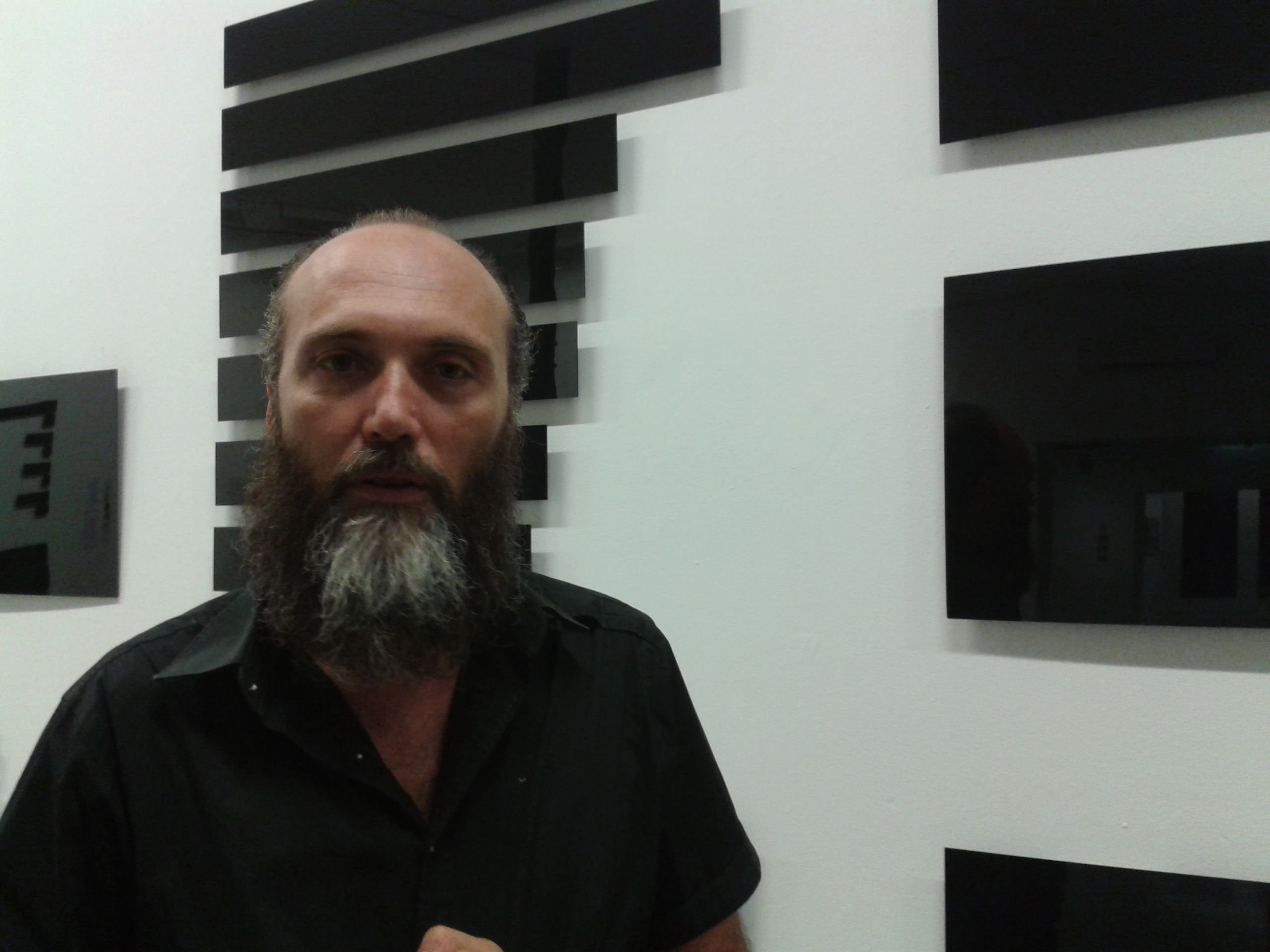
- Jaime Serra in 2013
- Born: 1964; Lleida

Jaime Serra Palou (Lleida, 1964) is a Catalan artist and journalist, specialized in infographics and data visualization design. He is the Director of Infographics and Illustration at La Vanguardia newspaper since October 2007, where since 2010 he publishes a column called A Sunday Paradox.

== Biography ==
Jaime Serra has been a professional journalist since early 1990s. He has worked at, among other media, El Periódico de Catalunya, Grupo Vocento, Tele 5, El Mundo Deportivo (Spain); Clarín, La Nación, La Voz del Interior, Olé (Argentina); El Comercio, La República (Peru); Diario de Noticias, Jornal de Noticias (Portugal); Editora Abril, O Dia (Brazil); Corriere della Sera, Il Sole 24 Ore, Gazzetta dello Sport, La Stampa (Italy); The Independent (United Kingdom), and National Geographic Magazine (USA). He has taught and lectured at, among other institutions, the Poynter Institute for Media Studies, Art Director Club NY, the Society for News Design (USA), the Instituto Internacional de Periodismo José Martín (Havana, Cuba). In Argentina he has lectured at the Universidad Nacional de la Plata, University of Buenos Aires and Universidad de Palermo. And in Spain at Pompeu Fabra University, Universitat Autònoma de Barcelona, Escola Eina, IDEP, Escola Massana, Elisava, FAD, University of Navarra, the School of Journalism at San Pablo CEU.

Since 2000s, Jaime Serra activity focuses on the field of artistic practices using infographics as a tool and data as raw material. As part of the same conceptual strategy, he combines the presentation of his work at contemporary art exhibitions with regular publication of those same proposals adapted to diverse editorial formats for the mass-media as the Spanish newspaper La Vanguardia and the French weekly Courrier International.

=== Artwork ===
Jaime Serra works with data sourced from his day-to-day life, using a language taken out of its natural journalistic context. Personal data displayed in the form of graphics and texts become strange objects. Infographics as a defamiliarisation device allows us to grasp what really matters: a narrative that challenges us and invites us to change our consciousness and our perception.

=== Recognition and awards ===
On 23 March 2012, Jonathon Berlin, President of the SND, The Society for News and Design, described him as the most influential infographer of the past twenty years. "If anyone has created a unique style with new and innovative ways to simplify life around us, it is Jaime. Creativity and artistic knowledge that helps us understand the reality at hand, inviting us to form opinions about it".

== Exhibitions ==
- Big Bang Data. Somerset House London, 2016; Fundación Telefónica Buenos Aires, 2015; Fundación Telefónica Santiago de Chile, 2016; Fundación Telefónica Madrid, 2015; Centre de Cultura Contemporània de Barcelona, CCCB, 2014.
- Ten stories and a landscape. Museo de Arte Contemporáneo, MAC, A Coruña, 2015.
- Stroke, drawing as a tool of knowledge, Arts Santa Mònica, Barcelona, 2014.
- Jaime Serra: Infographics. Museu d'Art Jaume Morera, Lleida, 2014. Centro Cultural y Educativo del Estado de Querétaro, México, 2014; Centro de Arte Contemporáneo Huarte, Pamplona, 2014; Arts Santa Mònica, Barcelona, 2013.
