= Robert Pérez Palou =

Spanish portrait painter (born 1948)

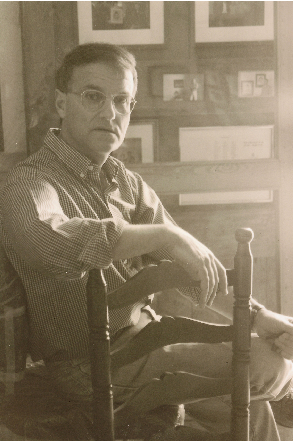
- Robert Pérez in his studio
- Born: March 21, 1948 (age 77); Linyola, Spain
- Education: Autodidact
- Known for: Pastel painting
- Movement: Photorealism in portrait painting
- Website: https://www.robertperez.es/

Robert Pérez Palou (born March 21, 1948) is a Spanish portrait painter.

== Biography ==
Robert Pérez Palou was born in Linyola, Lleida, Spain, where he continues to reside. The son of a farmer, he also grew up to become one despite his early displays of artistic talent. With no access to formal art education, Pérez developed his technique on his own. In 1988 he began to paint professionally while continuing to farm, until 1995, when health problems forced him at the age of 47 to retire from agriculture. Pérez thereafter reoriented his life to devote himself completely to his early calling of painting. He has participated in art shows including exhibitions in Barcelona, Paris, New York, Los Angeles, Dubai, Japan and Madrid.

Pérez is related to soccer players Bojan Krkić and Lionel Messi. Two great-great-grandfathers of Bojan and Mesi were brothers. Pérez is a descendant of the same family tree, being the uncle of the mother of Bojan. It was Pérez through his research in 2011 who discovered this common ancestry.

== Style and works ==
Pérez specializes in studio portrait painting using pastel, although he has also used Oil painting. His mastery of the technique has allowed him to paint portraits with a high level of accuracy and detail, making his paintings close to photo-realistic. GAL ART describes him as "Excellent portrait painter expressing himself through pastel; mastering the drawing and technique, unveils knowledge that could be put to the service of spectacular beauty". Josep María Cadena, analyzing Young Hindu, said "It is a realist piece produced in pastel; it is well done, especially in the care of the hands, which is usually one of the more difficult body parts to draw". In 2018 Manuela Ruiz Berrio, an art dealer, said of Pérez that "he imprints in his retina what he sees [in his subject], and imbues the portrait with soul", further adding that "the eyes speak, their gazes are deep at times, sweet others; the smiles of children and their sorrows... they are so well expressed on the canvas that it seems you were having a conversation with them".

Pérez paints three types of portraits: public figures, anonymous ethnic portraits, and paintings of private citizens. In his public figures series he paints known people from the social, political and show business spheres, later frequently personally delivering the portrait to its subject. These are actors, singers, athletes, politicians and philanthropists such as Julio Iglesias, Núria Feliu, José Carreras, Baroness Thyssen, Pep Guardiola, Maria del Mar Bonet, Jordi Pujol, José Mari Bakero, Marta Ferrusola. In his ethnic series-the type he enjoys the most- Pérez paints anonymous individuals from around world, mostly from Africa and India. Pérez also paints portraits commissioned by private citizens.

In 2019 he completed a painting of Jesus to be placed in the church Santa Maria de Linyola.

== Exhibitions ==
- Barcelona, Fundraiser by Christie's for the Catalan Foundation of Gastroenterology (1998)
- Andorra, Sala del Comu d'Encamp (1999)
- Fukushima, Abudu Gallery Aizu Wakamatsu (2003)
- New York, New Century Artist Gallery (2005)
- Barcelona, ‘Art and Humanitarian Assistance’, at the Diocesan Museum (2006)
- Barcelona, Salo Internacional d'Art Contemporani (2008)
- Madrid, Museo de Arte contemporaneo 'Conde Duque' (2008)
- Dubai, International Art Fair (2009)
- Paris, International Fair 'Art Shopping Paris' at the Louvre Museum (2009)
- Los Angeles, Latino Art Museum 'The Hollywood Connection' (2010)
- Madrid, Centro Cultural Nicolás Salmerón (2018)

In addition Pérez makes his workshop in his hometown of Linyola open to the public.

== Gallery ==
=== Public figures series ===
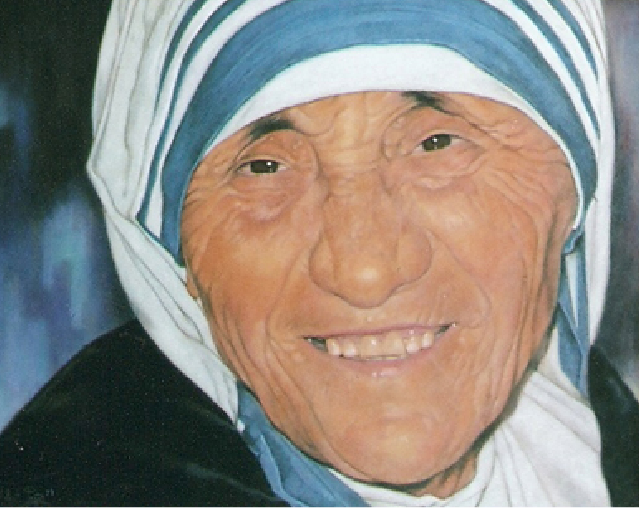
Mother Teresa of Calcuta, 1994

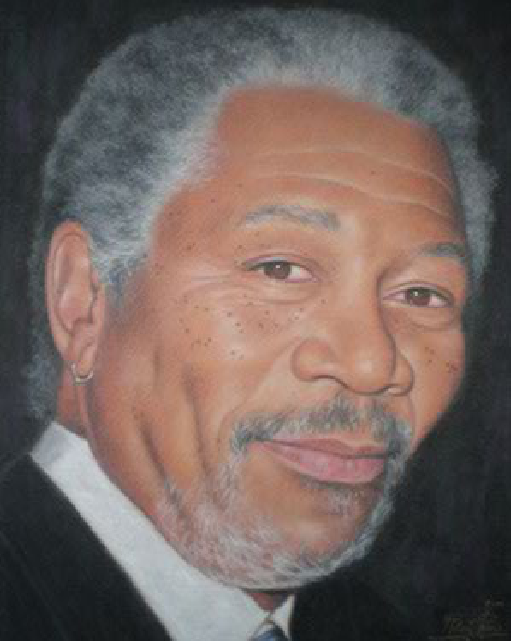
Morgan Freeman, 2010

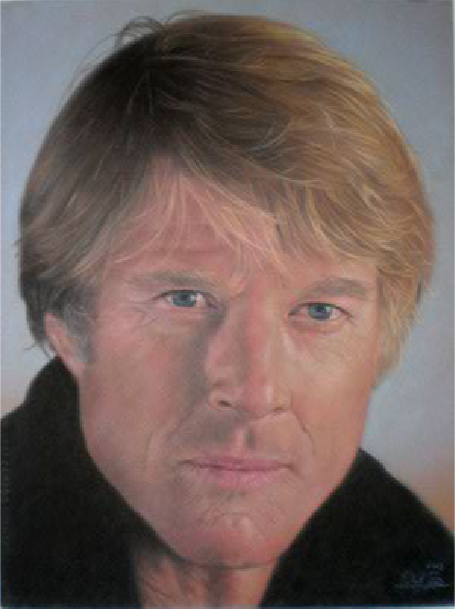
Robert Redford, 2003

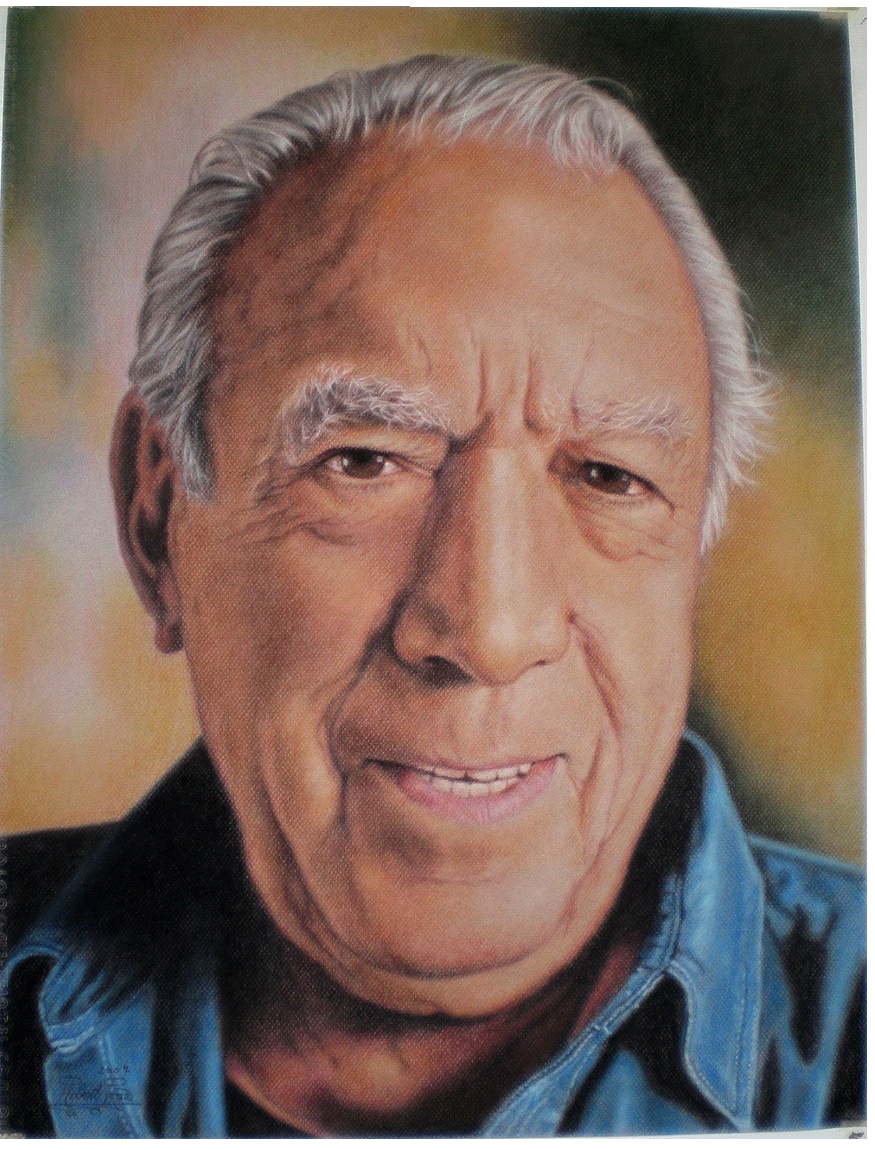
Anthony Quinn, 2007

=== Ethnic series ===
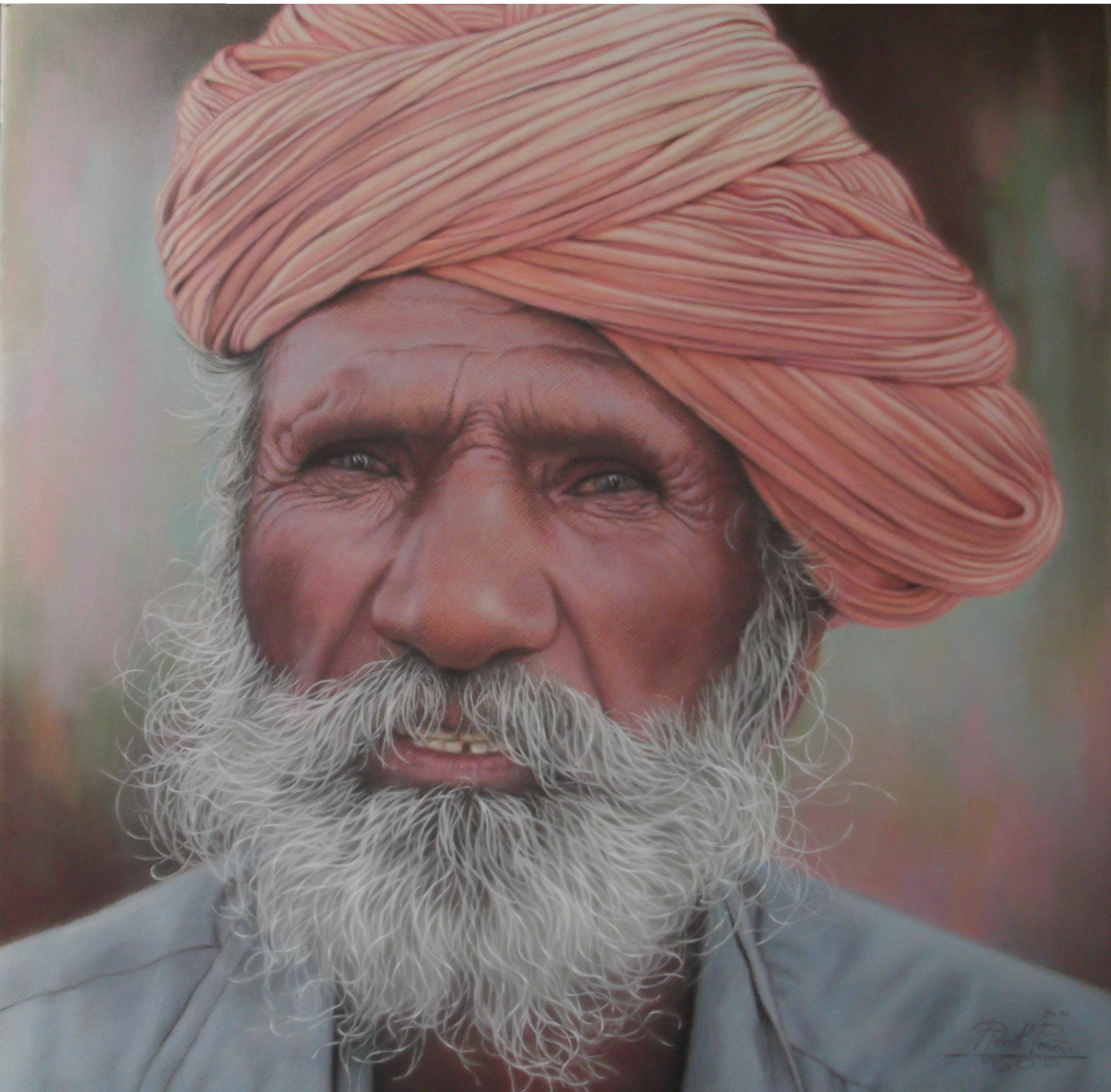
Old Hindu, 2011

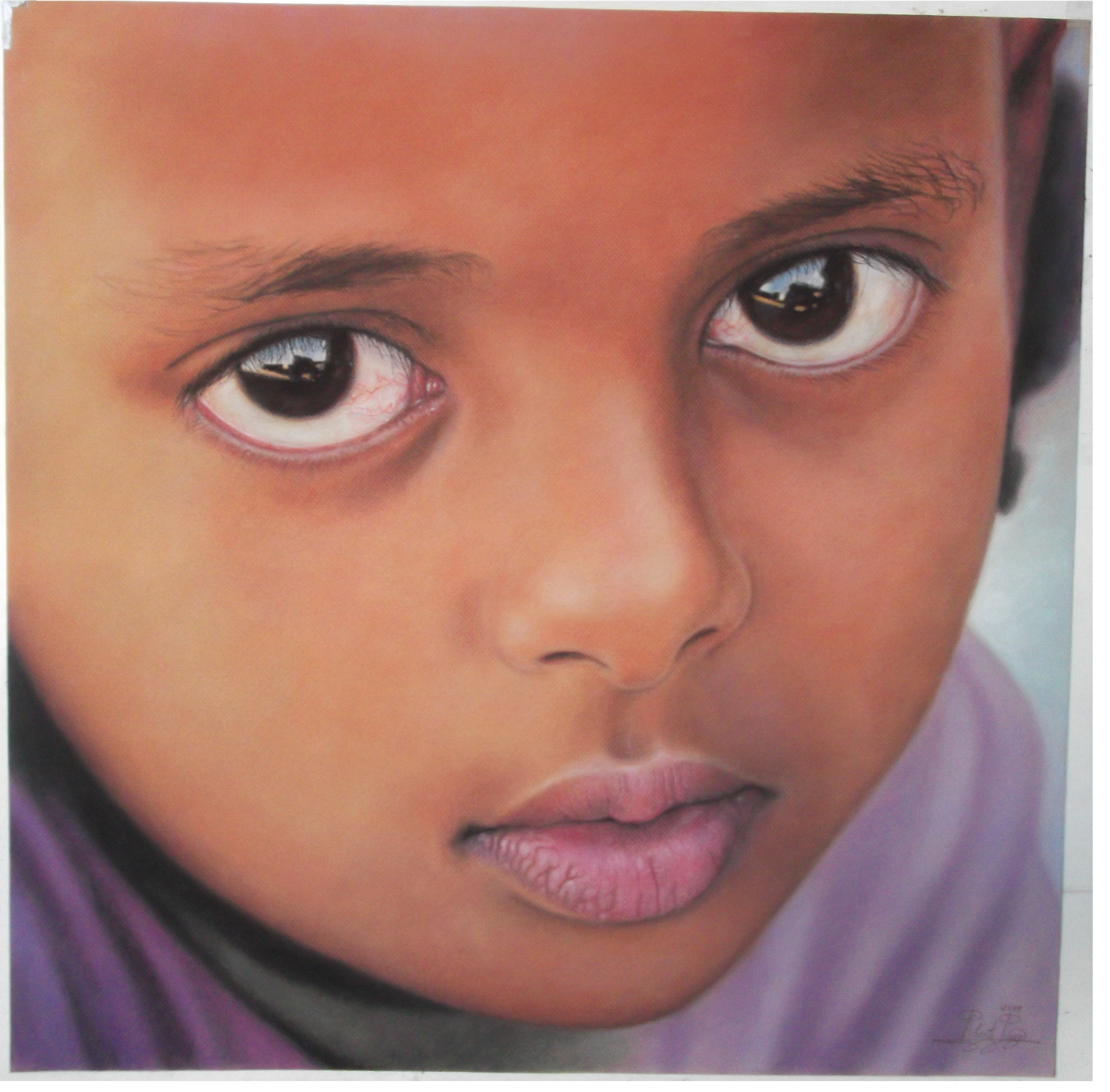
Dulce Mirada (Sweet Stare), 2011

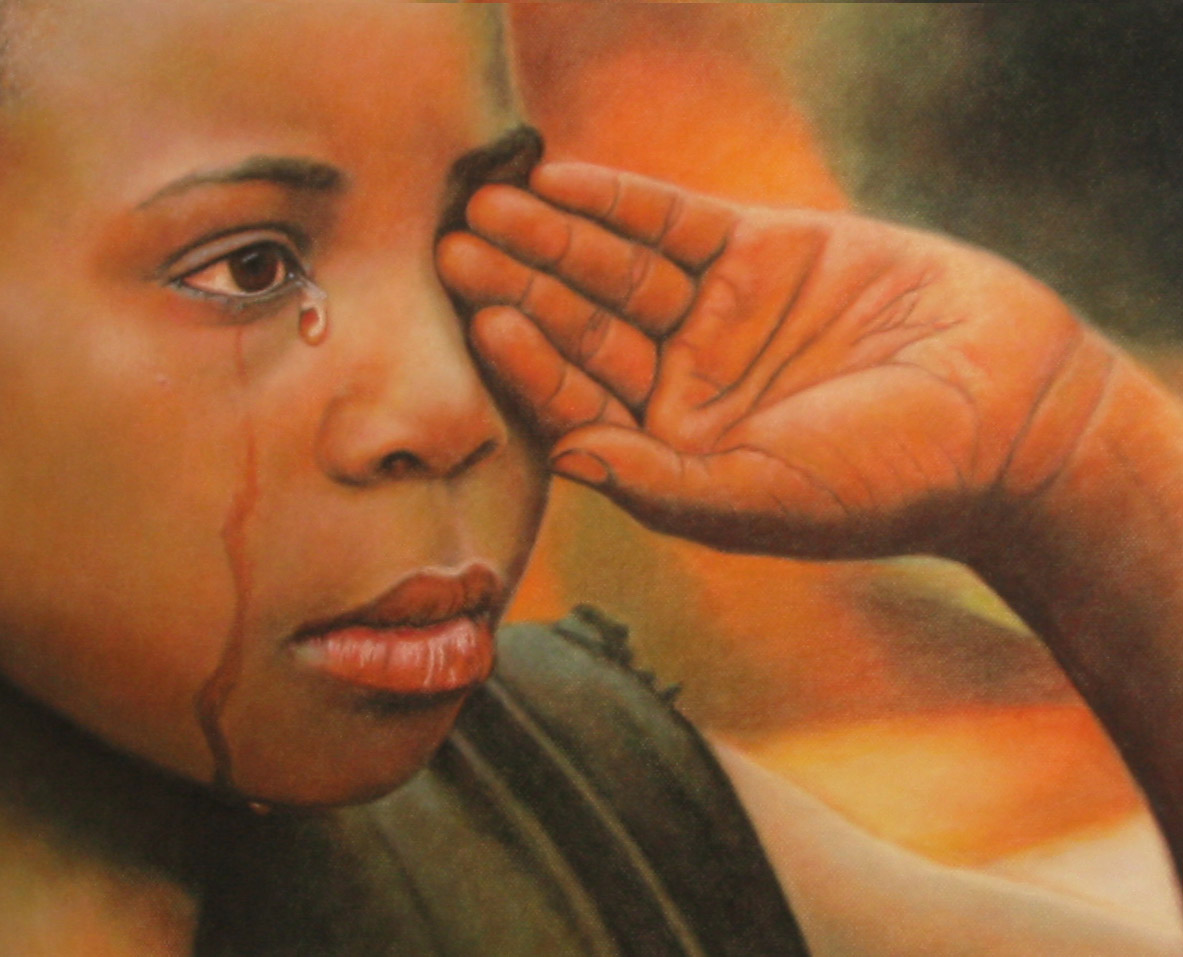
Tears, 1998
