= Subdivisions of Catalonia =

Outline of Catalonia's administrative subdivisions

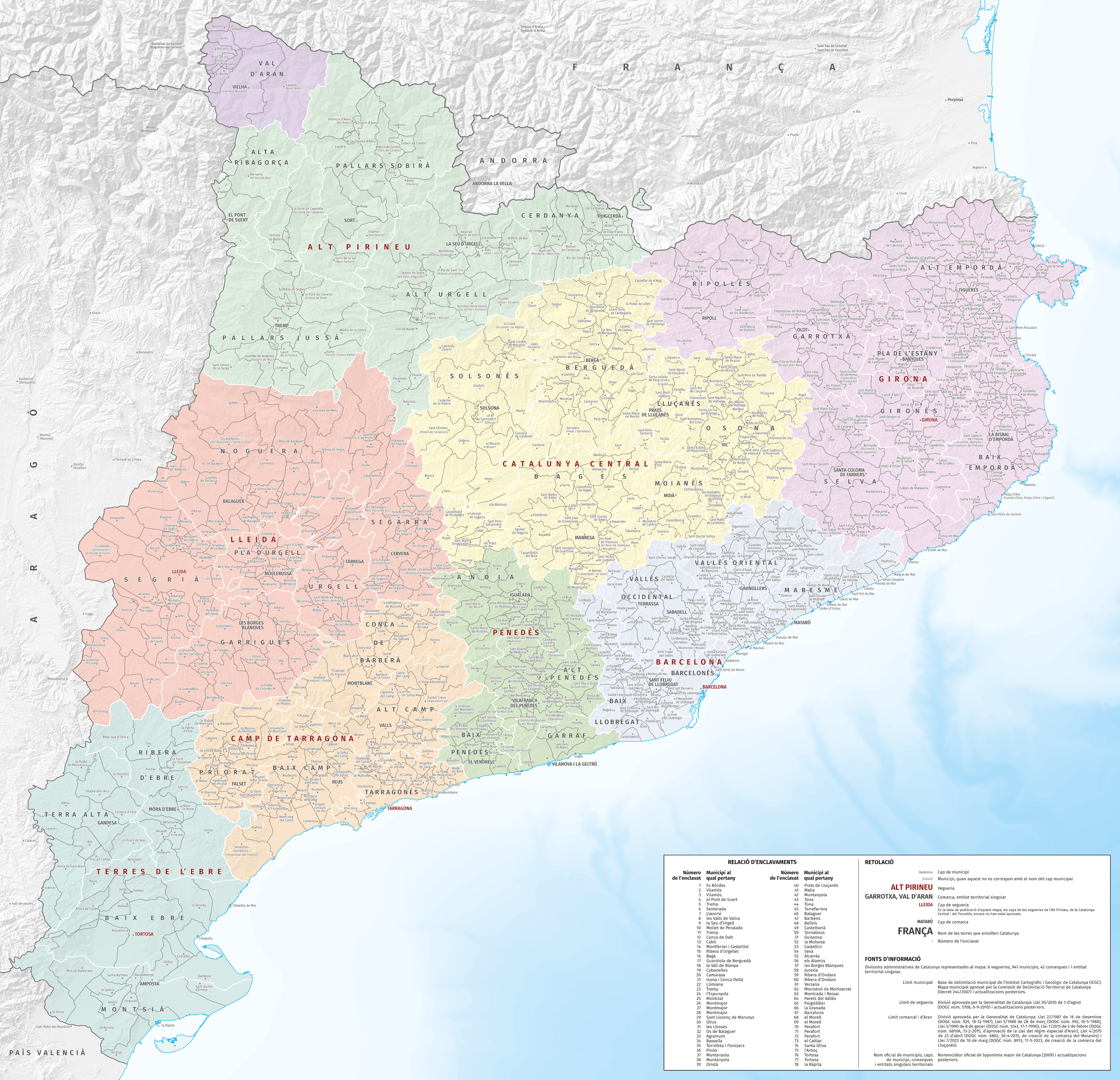
Catalonia's divisions in January 2025 (vegueries, counties and autonomous region of Aran, and municipalities)

Catalonia, referring to the autonomous community in Spain, is territorially divided into numerous types and levels of subdivisions with varying administrative, organisational and cultural functions.

== Vegueries, areas and counties ==
=== Vegueries and areas ===
Catalonia's eight vegueries in 2021, plus the autonomous Aran Valley, which is not part of any vegueria

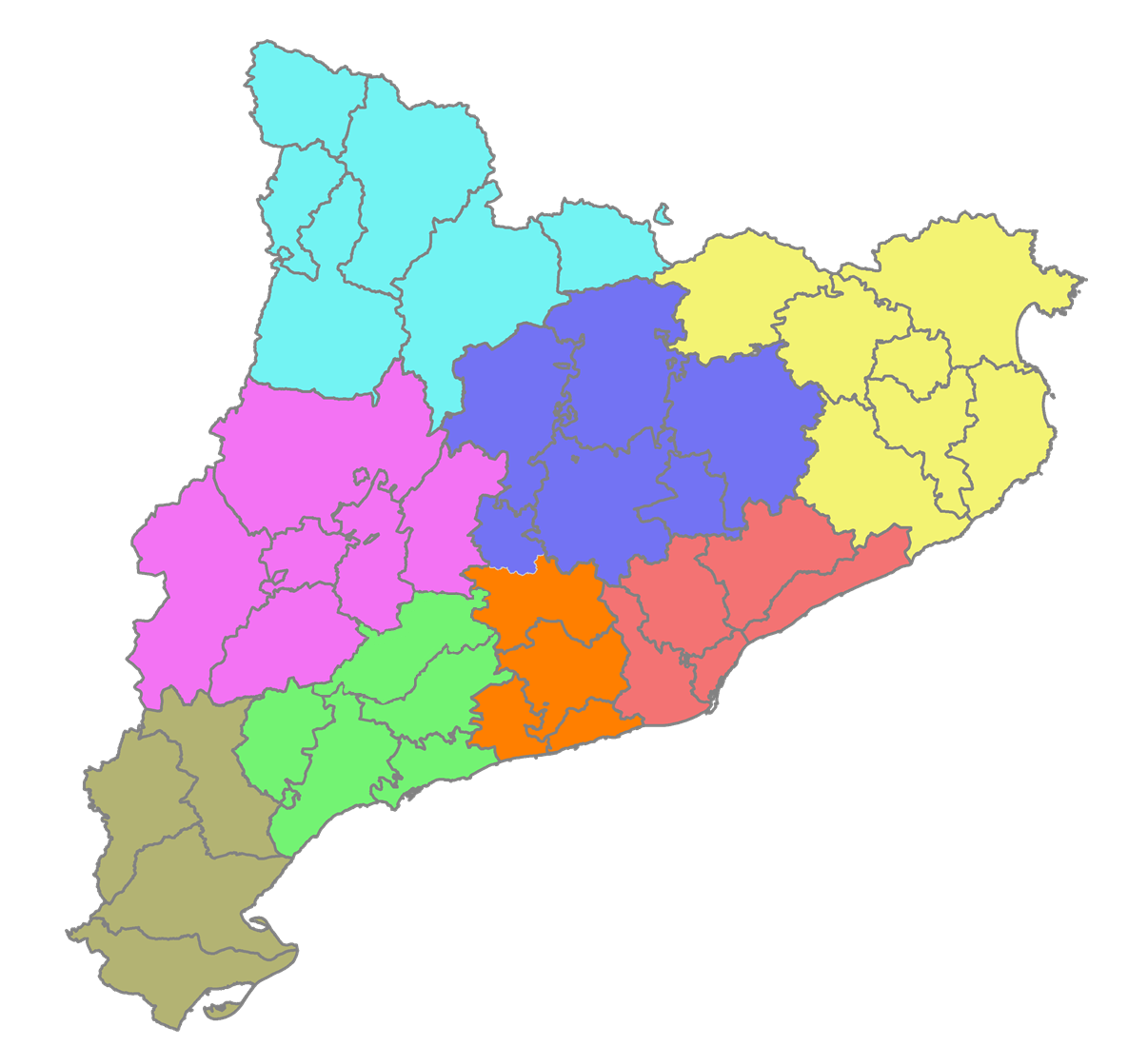
Functional territorial areas of Catalonia in 2016

==== Vegueries ====
The official first-level regional distribution in Catalonia, configured through the Statute of Autonomy of 2006, is the vegueria (Catalan pronunciation: [bəɣəˈɾi.ə]), owing its name to the feudal jurisdiction of the former Principality of Catalonia.

Regulated by the Vegueries Law, approved on 27 July 2010 in Parliament, they aim to form vegueria councils and become a full administrative division, although the law has been ruled unconstitutional by the Spanish Constitutional Court, as it replaces functions performed by Spanish provinces (). Thus, in practice, despite being official, vegueries are not allowed to carry the administrative powers of the provinces and currently remain only usable for similar territorial deployments to those carried out by the areas, e.g. government services, weather reports, commercial distribution, media coverage, curfew during the COVID-19 pandemic, television frequencies, etc.

There are eight vegueries since 2017. The Aran Valley is not part of any vegueria, as it has been an autonomous region since 2015. There are a number of proposals to create a ninth vegueria around the Alt Ter region.

===== Areas =====
Predating the vegueries and for statistical purposes, Catalonia is also divided in "functional territorial areas" (Catalan: àmbits funcionals territorials; Aranese Occitan: encastres foncionaus territoriaus). These were stablished in 1995 by the Catalan General Territorial Plan. They are largely the same as the vegueries, with mostly identical names, with the main exception being that the Aran Valley is included within Alt Pirineu in the Alt Pirineu i Aran area.

=== Counties ===
Counties of Catalonia (plus Aran) in 2023

Catalonia's counties (Catalan: comarques, Catalan pronunciation: [kuˈmarkə]) form the second-level division and are a subdivision of the vegueries.

There are 42 administrative counties since 2023. Aran was a county until 2015, when it formally became an autonomous region, but it is still often included in county lists and maps as one. Each comarca has a representative county council (Catalan: consell comarcal), except for Barcelonès, which abolished it in 2019, and Lluçanès, which, having only been established in 2023, will not have one until the 2027 local elections.

==== Sub-counties ====
Counties often include cultural subdivisions known as sub-counties (Catalan: subcomarques), with no administrative value. Some of these were proposed as new administrative counties in the 2001 Roca report:

- Alta Segarra, with its capital in Calaf.
- Baix Llobregat Nord, with its capital in Martorell.
- Moianès, with its capital in Moià.
- Segre Mitjà, with its capital in Ponts.
- Selva Marítima, with its capital in Blanes.
- Vall de Camprodon, with its capital in Camprodon.

In 2015, Moianès achieved full administrative county status, followed by Lluçanès in 2023.

== Spanish provinces ==
The four Spanish provinces that make up Catalonia

The autonomous community of Catalonia is formed from the union of the four Spanish provinces (Catalan and Aranese Occitan: províncies) of Barcelona, Girona, Lleida and Tarragona. These were codified during the 1833 territorial division of Spain. Although the vegueries were created to replace the provinces, all government, constituency and administration tasks remain constitutionally attributed to the provincial councils (Catalan: diputacions; Aranese Occitan: deputacions).

Unlike vegueries, provinces only follow municipal boundaries and not county ones. This creates some rupture points, notably the county of Baixa Cerdanya, which is broken in half, with the western section administratively belonging to the province of Lleida and the eastern one to the province of Girona. Situations like this have led some isolated municipalities to request a change of provincial boundaries from the Spanish government in order to solve problems in accessing services. One such case is Gósol (Berguedà), the sole municipality in the county that belongs to the province of Lleida, while the rest fall within the province of Barcelona.

Catalans often refer to the provinces in everyday language or in the media as 'demarcations' (Catalan and Aranese Occitan: demarcacions), attributed by some to their lack of identification or cultural significance.

== Municipalities ==
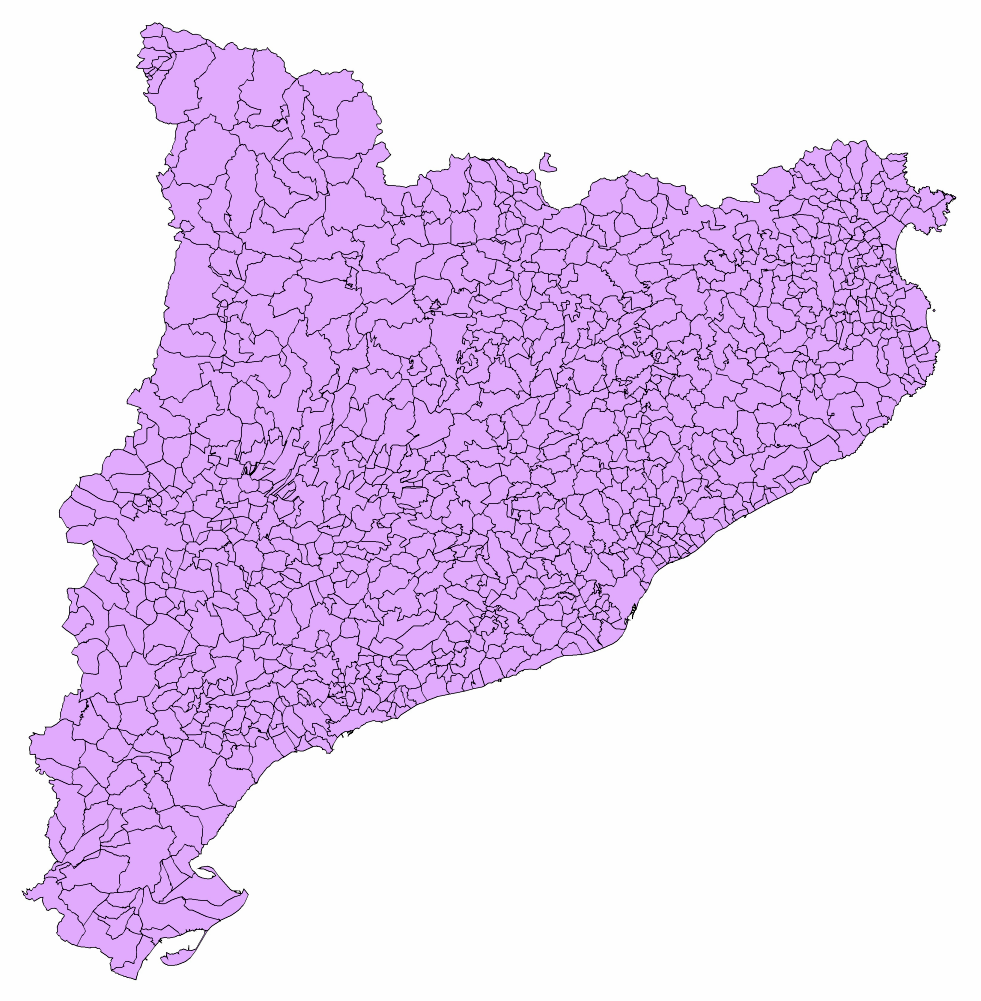
Map of Catalonia's municipalities

The municipalities (Catalan and Aranese Occitan: municipis) constitute the third-level division. In 2024, there were 947 municipalities. Municipalities are run by a council (Catalan and Aranese Occitan: ajuntament) elected through Spain-wide local elections, which then elects a mayor (Catalan: batlle (batle in Terres de l'Ebre); Aranese Occitan: baile).

Unlike other Catalan-speaking territories in Spain, all municipalities in the autonomous community of Catalonia have their names officially in the Catalan language (or in Aranese Occitan, in Aran), but some still use non-standard Castilianised names, such as Cabassers, officially spelled 'Cabacés'.

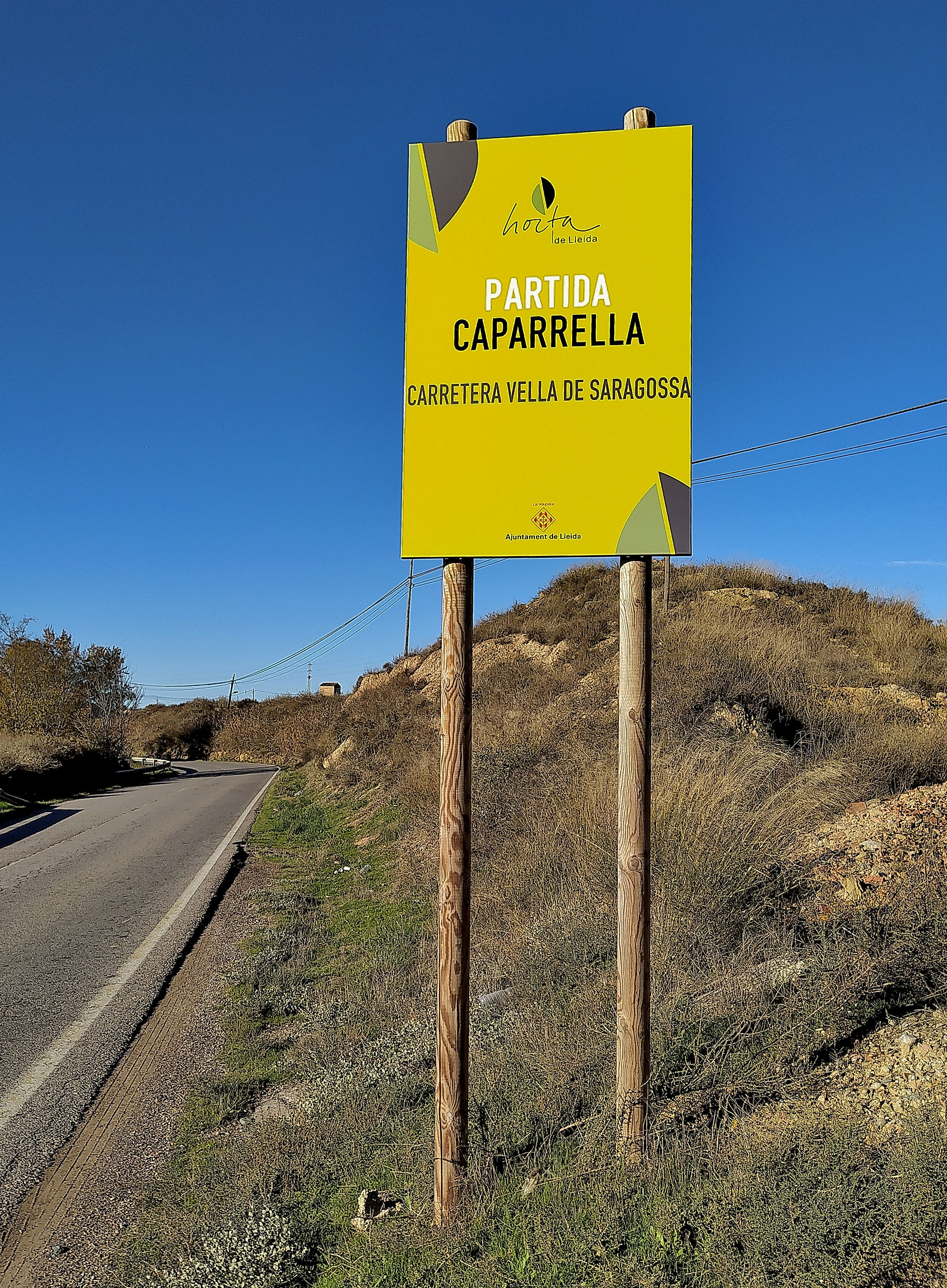
Partida of Caparrella within Lleida

Municipalities are sometimes further subdivided into:

- Decentralised municipal entities (Catalan: entitats municipals descentralitzades; Aranese Occitan: entitats municipaus descentralizades; EMD), consisting of one or more settlements without their own town council that are jointly governed by a neighbourhood council.
- Rural areas, or partides rurals, present in some municipalities as a subdivision of the area of the municipal term that does not belong to the seat town or to any decentralised municipal entities. One such case is the partides of Lleida, which make up the Horta de Lleida.

== Subdivisions of Aran ==
The six terçons of Aran within municipality delimitations

The Aran Valley, being a self-governing region within Catalonia (officially a 'unique territorial entity'; Aranese Occitan: entitat territoriau singulara; Catalan: entitat territorial singular) instead of a regular county, as well as a part of the Occitan cultural realm, represents a unique position in the Catalan regional configuration.

Its autonomous government, the General Council of Aran (Aranese Occitan: Conselh Generau d'Aran) was formed in 1991. Originally, it was a mere additional county until the new Aranese law of 2015, which promoted this status, as well as notably recognising its symbols and anthem, giving priority to the Occitan language in administrative matters, and granting the valley the right to self-determination. Furthermore, by extension, it ensured that Aran would not fall within the Alt Pirineu region.

=== Terçons ===
Terçons are an administrative and electoral subdivision exclusive to Aran. The valley is divided in six terçons.

=== Municipalities of Aran ===
Like the rest of Catalonia, the valley is also divided into municipalities. Aran is composed of nine municipalities, two of which (Vielha e Mijaran and Naut Aran) cover several terçons.

== List of subdivisions ==
Subdivisions of the autonomous community of Catalonia
| First-level division | | | | | | Second-level division | | | | | | Functional area | Spanish province |
| Designation | Location | Name | Capital | Population (2023) | Main admin. language | County | County seat | Flag | Coat of arms | Population (2023) | Code | Functional area | Spanish province |
|---|---|---|---|---|---|---|---|---|---|---|---|---|---|
| vegueria | | Alt Pirineu | La Seu d'Urgell (de facto) (Note: Following the vegueries law, the regions of Alt Pirineu, Central Catalonia and Penedès have the most populated cities as their de facto capitals until a law determines them.) | 65,998 | Catalan | Alt Urgell | La Seu d'Urgell | - | | 21,128 | AU / 04 | Alt Pirineu i Aran | Lleida |
| vegueria | | Alt Pirineu | La Seu d'Urgell (de facto) | 65,998 | Catalan | Alta Ribagorça | El Pont de Suert | - | - | 4,040 | AG / 05 | Alt Pirineu i Aran | Lleida |
| vegueria | | Alt Pirineu | La Seu d'Urgell (de facto) | 65,998 | Catalan | Baixa Cerdanya | Puigcerdà | - | | 20,115 | CD / 15 | Alt Pirineu i Aran | Lleida (west) Girona (east) |
| vegueria | | Alt Pirineu | La Seu d'Urgell (de facto) | 65,998 | Catalan | Pallars Jussà | Tremp | - | | 13,383 | PJ / 25 | Alt Pirineu i Aran | Lleida |
| vegueria | | Alt Pirineu | La Seu d'Urgell (de facto) | 65,998 | Catalan | Pallars Sobirà | Sort | | | 7,332 | PS / 26 | Alt Pirineu i Aran | Lleida |
| vegueria | | Barcelona | Barcelona | 5,066,684 | Catalan | Baix Llobregat | Sant Feliu de Llobregat | - | - | 848,827 | BT / 11 | Metropolità | Barcelona |
| vegueria | | Barcelona | Barcelona | 5,066,684 | Catalan | Barcelonès | Barcelona | - | - | 2,354,301 | BR / 13 | Metropolità | Barcelona |
| vegueria | | Barcelona | Barcelona | 5,066,684 | Catalan | Maresme | Mataró | - | | 472,572 | MM / 21 | Metropolità | Barcelona |
| vegueria | | Barcelona | Barcelona | 5,066,684 | Catalan | Vallès Occidental | Sabadell, Terrassa (Note: Shared capital status. The county council is located in Terrassa.) | - | - | 960,033 | VC / 40 | Metropolità | Barcelona |
| vegueria | | Barcelona | Barcelona | 5,066,684 | Catalan | Vallès Oriental | Granollers | - | - | 426,653 | VR / 41 | Metropolità | Barcelona |
| vegueria | | Camp de Tarragona | Tarragona | 555,957 | Catalan | Alt Camp | Valls | - | | 46,388 | AC / 01 | Camp de Tarragona | Tarragona |
| vegueria | | Camp de Tarragona | Tarragona | 555,957 | Catalan | Baix Camp | Reus | | | 204,458 | BC / 08 | Camp de Tarragona | Tarragona |
| vegueria | | Camp de Tarragona | Tarragona | 555,957 | Catalan | Conca de Barberà | Montblanc | | | 20,569 | CB / 16 | Camp de Tarragona | Tarragona |
| vegueria | | Camp de Tarragona | Tarragona | 555,957 | Catalan | Priorat | Falset | - | | 9,420 | PR / 29 | Camp de Tarragona | Tarragona |
| vegueria | | Camp de Tarragona | Tarragona | 555,957 | Catalan | Tarragonès | Tarragona | - | - | 275,122 | TR / 36 | Camp de Tarragona | Tarragona |
| vegueria | | Central Catalonia | Manresa (de facto) | 427,296 | Catalan | Bages | Manresa | - | - | 185,352 | BG / 07 | Comarques Centrals | Barcelona |
| vegueria | | Central Catalonia | Manresa (de facto) | 427,296 | Catalan | Berguedà | Berga | | | 41,058 | BD / 14 | Comarques Centrals | Barcelona Lleida (Gósol) |
| vegueria | | Central Catalonia | Manresa (de facto) | 427,296 | Catalan | Lluçanès | Prats de Lluçanès | - | - | 5,718 | N/A (Note: No letter code is available as Lluçanès became an administrative county in 2023, by which time the codes had changed to numbers.) / 43 | Comarques Centrals | Barcelona |
| vegueria | | Central Catalonia | Manresa (de facto) | 427,296 | Catalan | Moianès | Moià | - | - | 14,758 | MO / 42 | Comarques Centrals | Barcelona |
| vegueria | | Central Catalonia | Manresa (de facto) | 427,296 | Catalan | Osona | Vic | | | 164,006 | OS / 24 | Comarques Centrals | Barcelona Girona (Espinelves, Vidrà, Viladrau) |
| vegueria | | Central Catalonia | Manresa (de facto) | 427,296 | Catalan | Solsonès | Solsona | - | - | 15,323 | SL / 35 | Comarques Centrals | Lleida |
| vegueria | | Girona | Girona | 804,851 | Catalan | Alt Empordà | Figueres | | | 148,732 | AE / 02 | Comarques Gironines | Girona |
| vegueria | | Girona | Girona | 804,851 | Catalan | Baix Empordà | La Bisbal d'Empordà | - | - | 143,443 | BM / 10 | Comarques Gironines | Girona |
| vegueria | | Girona | Girona | 804,851 | Catalan | Garrotxa | Olot | - | - | 62,449 | GX / 19 | Comarques Gironines | Girona |
| vegueria | | Girona | Girona | 804,851 | Catalan | Gironès | Girona | - | - | 205,573 | GN / 20 | Comarques Gironines | Girona |
| vegueria | | Girona | Girona | 804,851 | Catalan | Pla de l'Estany | Banyoles | - | - | 33,564 | PE / 28 | Comarques Gironines | Girona |
| vegueria | | Girona | Girona | 804,851 | Catalan | Ripollès | Ripoll | - | - | 25,826 | RI / 31 | Comarques Gironines | Girona |
| vegueria | | Girona | Girona | 804,851 | Catalan | Selva | Santa Coloma de Farners | - | - | 185,264 | SV / 34 | Comarques Gironines | Girona Barcelona (Fogars de la Selva) |
| vegueria | | Penedès | Vilanova i la Geltrú (de facto) | 517,499 | Catalan | Alt Penedès | Vilafranca del Penedès | - | - | 114,189 | AP / 03 | Penedès | Barcelona |
| vegueria | | Penedès | Vilanova i la Geltrú (de facto) | 517,499 | Catalan | Anoia (Note: The northern portion of Anoia county is part of Central Catalonia.) | Igualada | | | 128,432 | AI / 06 | Penedès | Barcelona |
| vegueria | | Penedès | Vilanova i la Geltrú (de facto) | 517,499 | Catalan | Baix Penedès | El Vendrell | - | - | 118,350 | BP / 12 | Penedès | Barcelona |
| vegueria | | Penedès | Vilanova i la Geltrú (de facto) | 517,499 | Catalan | Garraf | Vilanova i la Geltrú | - | - | 161,907 | GA / 17 | Penedès | Barcelona |
| vegueria | | Ponent | Lleida | 375,964 | Catalan | Garrigues | Les Borges Blanques | | | 19,075 | GG / 18 | Ponent | Lleida |
| vegueria | | Ponent | Lleida | 375,964 | Catalan | Noguera | Balaguer | | | 39,727 | NG / 23 | Ponent | Lleida |
| vegueria | | Ponent | Lleida | 375,964 | Catalan | Pla d'Urgell | Mollerussa | | | 38,111 | PU / 27 | Ponent | Lleida |
| vegueria | | Ponent | Lleida | 375,964 | Catalan | Segarra | Cervera | - | | 22,667 | SR / 32 | Ponent | Lleida |
| vegueria | | Ponent | Lleida | 375,964 | Catalan | Segrià | Lleida | | | 217,853 | SI / 33 | Ponent | Lleida |
| vegueria | | Ponent | Lleida | 375,964 | Catalan | Urgell | Tàrrega | | | 38,531 | UR / 38 | Ponent | Lleida |
| vegueria | | Terres de l'Ebre | Tortosa | 187,437 | Catalan | Baix Ebre | Tortosa | | | 82,399 | BB / 09 | Terres de l'Ebre | Tarragona |
| vegueria | | Terres de l'Ebre | Tortosa | 187,437 | Catalan | Montsià | Amposta | - | | 71,460 | MT / 22 | Terres de l'Ebre | Tarragona |
| vegueria | | Terres de l'Ebre | Tortosa | 187,437 | Catalan | Ribera d'Ebre | Móra d'Ebre | - | | 22,132 | RE / 30 | Terres de l'Ebre | Tarragona |
| vegueria | | Terres de l'Ebre | Tortosa | 187,437 | Catalan | Terra Alta | Gandesa | - | | 11,446 | TT / 37 | Terres de l'Ebre | Tarragona |
| unique territorial entity | | Aran Valley | Vielha e Mijaran | 10,545 | Occitan | - | | | | 10,545 | VN / 38 | Alt Pirineu i Aran | Lleida |

== Other subdivisions ==
=== Districts and neighbourhoods ===
The ten districts of Barcelona

Many Catalan cities are divided into neighbourhoods (Catalan and Aranese Occitan: barris). In the case of Barcelona, the city has a higher level of administrative division than the neighbourhoods, which are the districts (Catalan: districtes). Each district has autonomy and capacity for decision-making and economic management. They are governed by a district municipal council that coordinates the district's services and resources.

=== Census areas ===
The census areas (Catalan: seccions censals; Aranese Occitan: seccions censaus) are a subdivision of municipalities and districts, used for census purposes, organisation of electoral processes or collection of statistical data. These areas may comprise a maximum of 2,000 electors and a minimum of 500.

=== Health areas ===
Catalonia's health areas in 2020

The health areas (Catalan and Aranese Occitan: regions sanitàries) are an arrangement of the CatSalut service to optimise medical care for all municipalities. They are largely similar to the functional territorial areas, with the Barcelona region being further divided into North, South and City.

=== Police areas and basic police areas ===
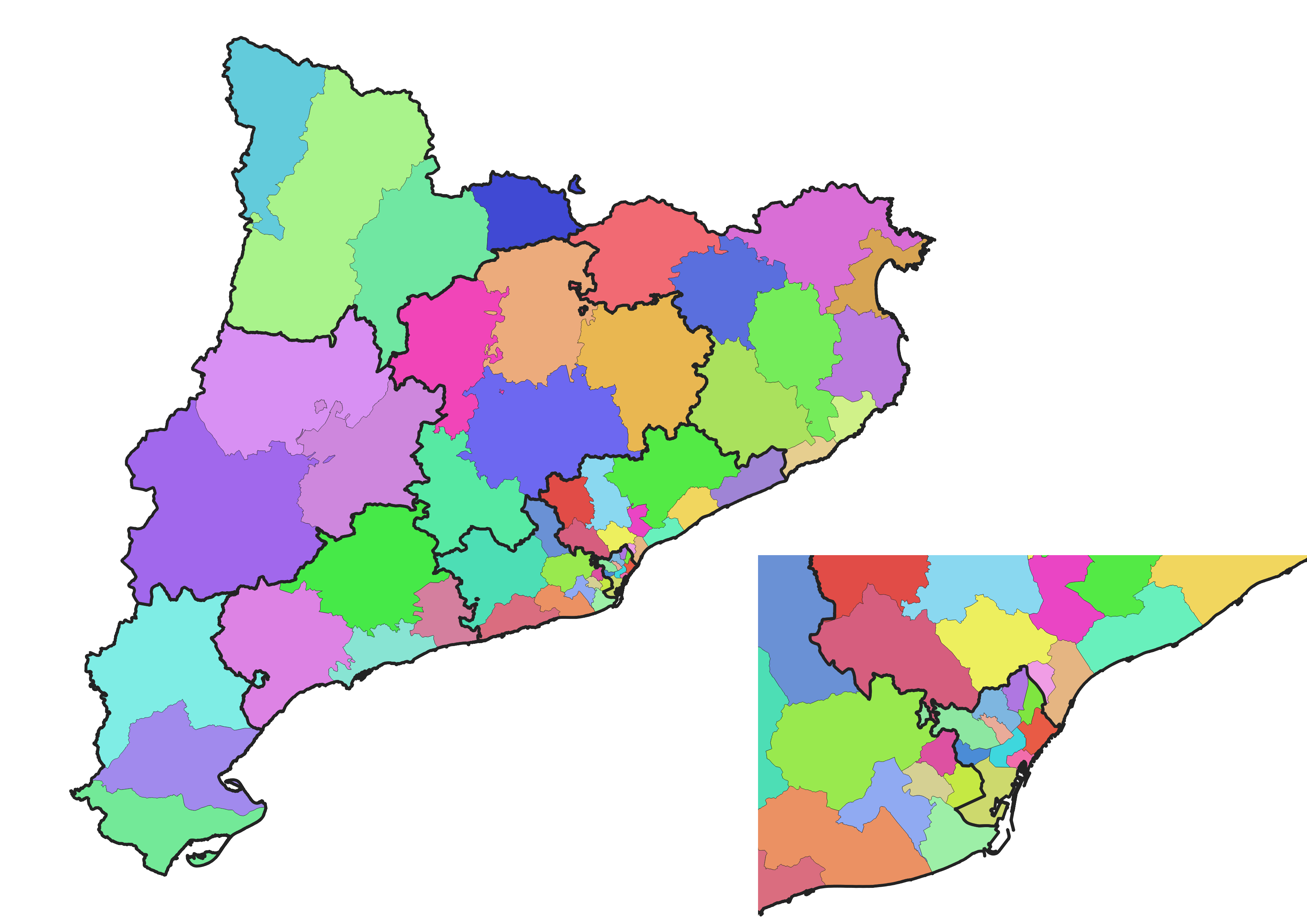
Catalonia's police areas and basic police areas in 2020

Catalonia's police force, the Mossos d'Esquadra, manage operations and services through nine police regions (Catalan: regions policials; Aranese Occitan: regions policères).

These regions are also similar to functional territorial areas, with the Barcelona region being divided into North, South and City, while northern Penedès is incorporated into the Central region and southern Penedès into the South Barcelona region. Each of these areas is further subdivided into 'basic police areas' (Catalan: àrees bàsiques policials; Aranese Occitan: airaus basics policèrs; ABP).

=== Judicial districts ===
Judicial districts of the four provincial divisions of Catalonia

Similar to the rest of the Spanish state, Catalonia is divided into 49 judicial districts (Catalan: partits judicials; Aranese Occitan: partits judiciaus) for the purpose of justice administration. These adhere to the province boundaries.

== Former divisions ==
=== Historical vegueries ===
Following the fall of al-Andalus in Catalonia, the supremacy of the county of Barcelona was consolidated, whose count became sovereign. The veguers exercised the delegation of royal power within their vegueries. The earliest known division of 1304 lists eighteen of them, while the last one of 1720 contains fifteen with eight veguers.

=== Corregimientos ===
Following the Nueva Planta decrees, the Principality of Catalonia became a province divided into twelve Castilian corregimientos (Barcelona, Cervera, Girona, Lleida, Manresa, Mataró, Puigcerdà, Talarn, Tarragona, Tortosa, Vic and Vilafranca del Penedès) and one district (Aran). The new division was based on the former vegueries, removing those of Agramunt, Balaguer, Tàrrega, Camprodon and Montblanc.

=== Departments ===
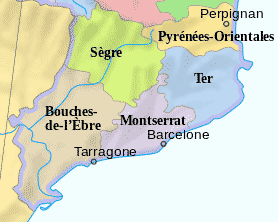
The Catalan departments in the Napoleonic Empire

Following the brief annexation of both the Spanish territory of Catalonia and Andorra by Napoleonic France, it was divided in four departments, along with Northern Catalonia, which remained in Pyrénées-Orientales:

- Bouches-de-l'Èbre (Catalan: Boques de l'Ebre), capital Lleida.
- Montserrat (Catalan: Montserrat), capital Barcelona.
- Sègre (Catalan: Segre), capital Puigcerdà.
- Ter (Catalan: Ter), capital Girona.

Aran was incorporated into the Haute-Garonne department.

=== 1936 division ===
Regions and counties of Catalonia between 1936 and 1939

The Study Report for the Territorial Division of Catalonia (Catalan: Ponència d'Estudi de la Divisió Territorial de Catalunya) was created by a decree in October 1931. In November 1931, a questionnaire was addressed to all municipal councils consolidating the first instance of the division of Catalonia into counties and vegueries. The division was approved in 1936, with some minor changes and labelling the regions with numerals. The division was operational until the removal of all Catalan autonomy by the Francoist regime after the end of the Spanish Civil War.

== See also ==
- Vegueries of Catalonia
- Counties of Catalonia
- Local government in Spain
