= ICGC =

ICGC may refer to:

- Imperial College Gliding Club
- Institut Cartogràfic i Geològic de Catalunya
- International Cancer Genome Consortium
- International Central Gospel Church
