= Monistrol =

Monistrol may refer to several places:

In France:

- Monistrol-d'Allier, Haute-Loire
- Monistrol-sur-Loire, Haute-Loire

In Spain:

- Monistrol de Calders, Bages, Catalonia
- Monistrol de Montserrat, Bages, Catalonia
