= L'Estany =

- Municipality
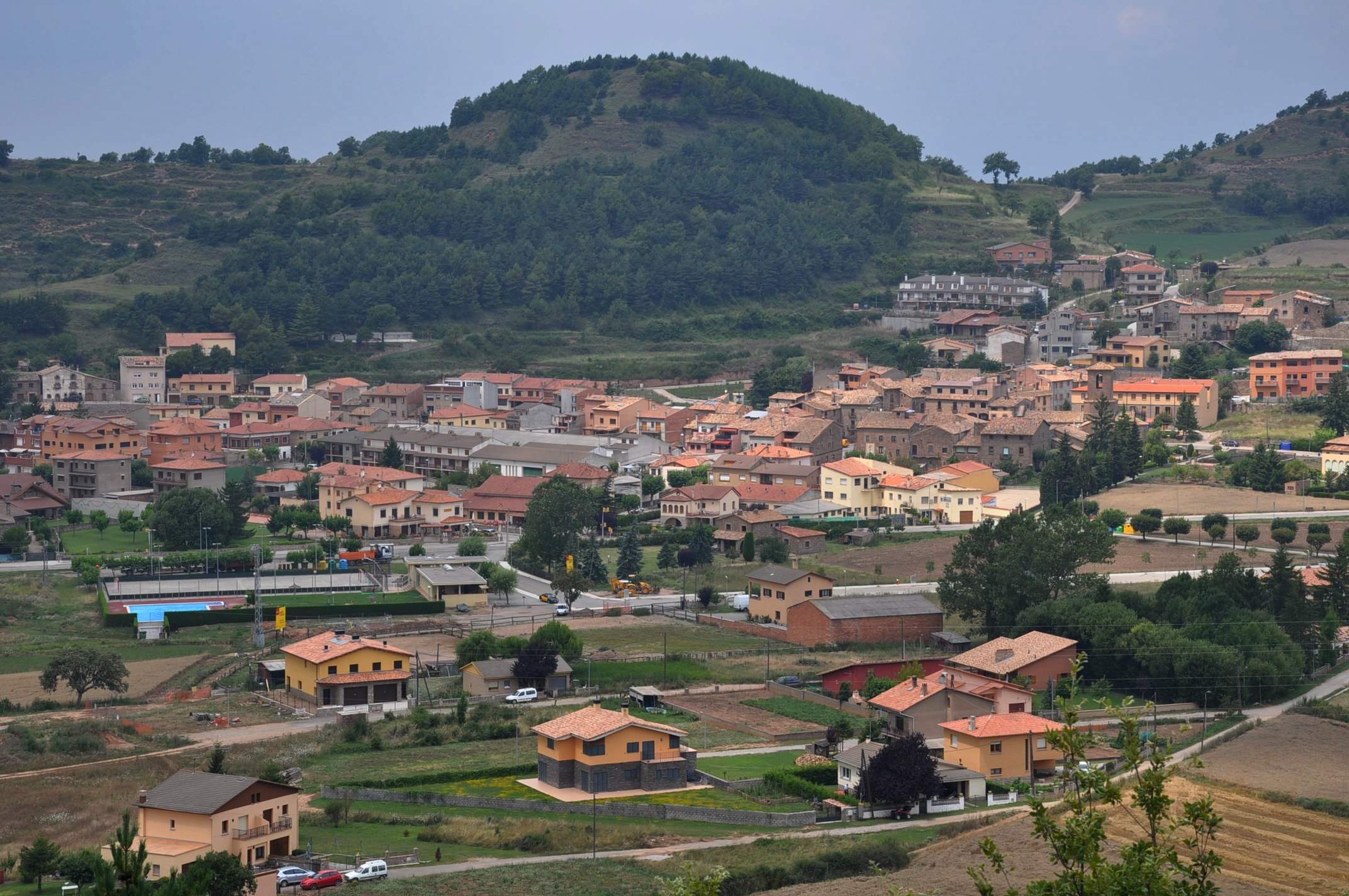

- Coat of arms

- Location in Catalonia L'Estany (Spain)
- Coordinates: 41°52′6″N 2°6′48″E
- Country: Spain
- Community: Catalonia
- Province: Barcelona
- Comarca: Moianès

Government
  - Mayor: Salvador Tresserra Purtí (2015)

Area
  - Total: 10.2 km^{2} (3.9 sq mi)

Population (2025-01-01)
  - Total: 390
  - Density: 38/km^{2} (99/sq mi)
- Website: www.estany.cat

L'Estany (Catalan pronunciation: [ləsˈtaɲ]) is a municipality in the province of Barcelona and autonomous community of Catalonia, Spain. The municipality covers an area of 10.25 square kilometres (3.96 sq mi) and as of 2011 had a population of 393 people.and the population in 2014 was 407. Since May 2015 it has been part of the new comarca of Moianès; previously it was in Bages.
