= Castellcir =

- Municipality
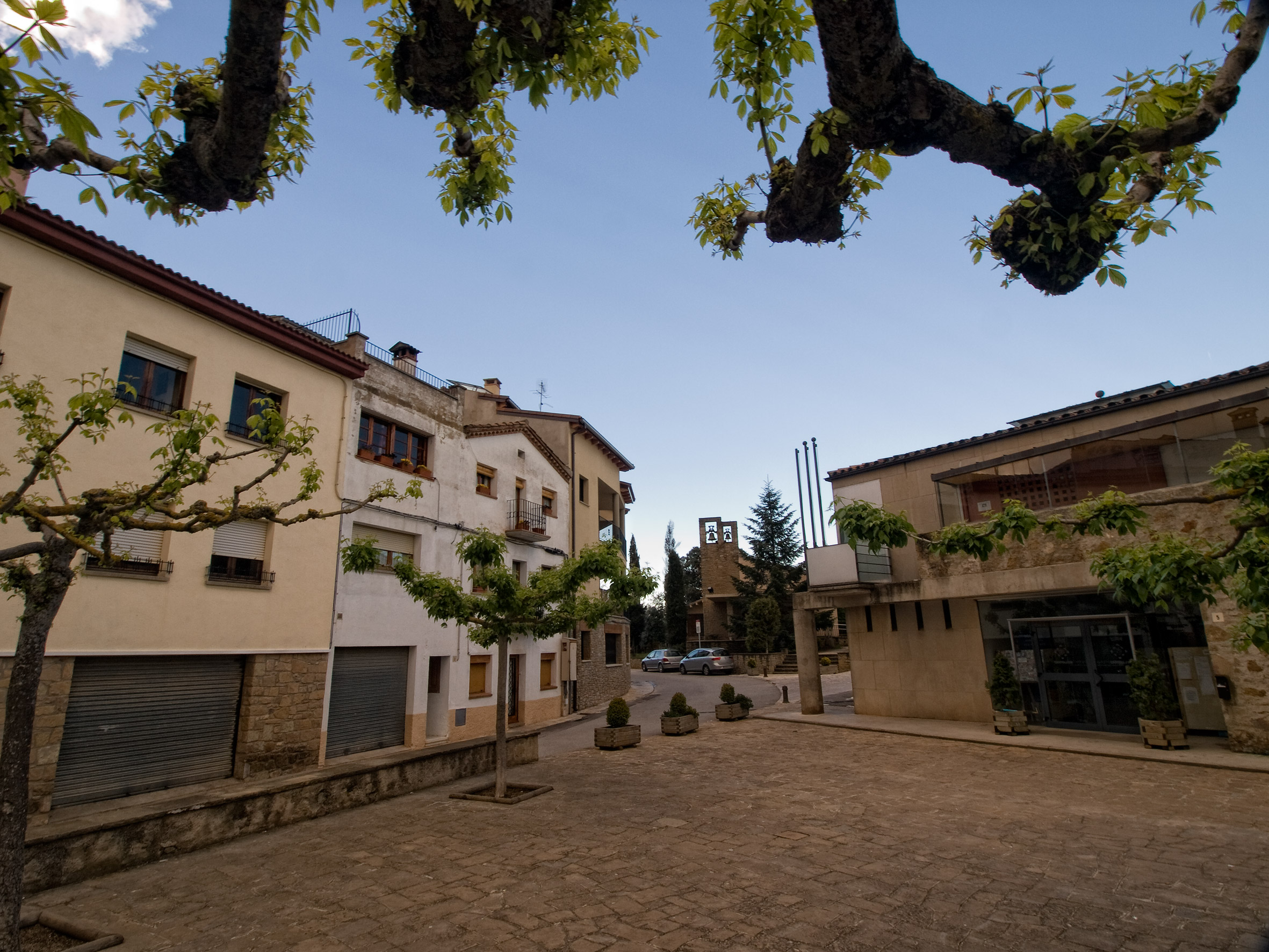

- Flag Coat of arms

- Location in Catalonia Castellcir (Spain)
- Coordinates: 41°45′43″N 2°8′59″E
- Country: Spain
- Community: Catalonia
- Province: Barcelona
- Comarca: Moianès

Government
  - Mayor: Eduard Guiteras Paré (2015)

Area
  - Total: 34.2 km^{2} (13.2 sq mi)

Population (2025-01-01)
  - Total: 804
  - Density: 23.5/km^{2} (60.9/sq mi)
- Website: www.castellcir.cat

Castellcir (Catalan pronunciation: [kəsˌteʎˈsi]) is a village in the province of Barcelona and autonomous community of Catalonia, Spain. The municipality covers an area of 34.2 square kilometres (13.2 sq mi) and the population in 2014 was 718. The municipality includes an exclave to the west. Since May 2015 it has been part of the new comarca of Moianès; previously it was in Vallès Oriental.
