= Collsuspina =

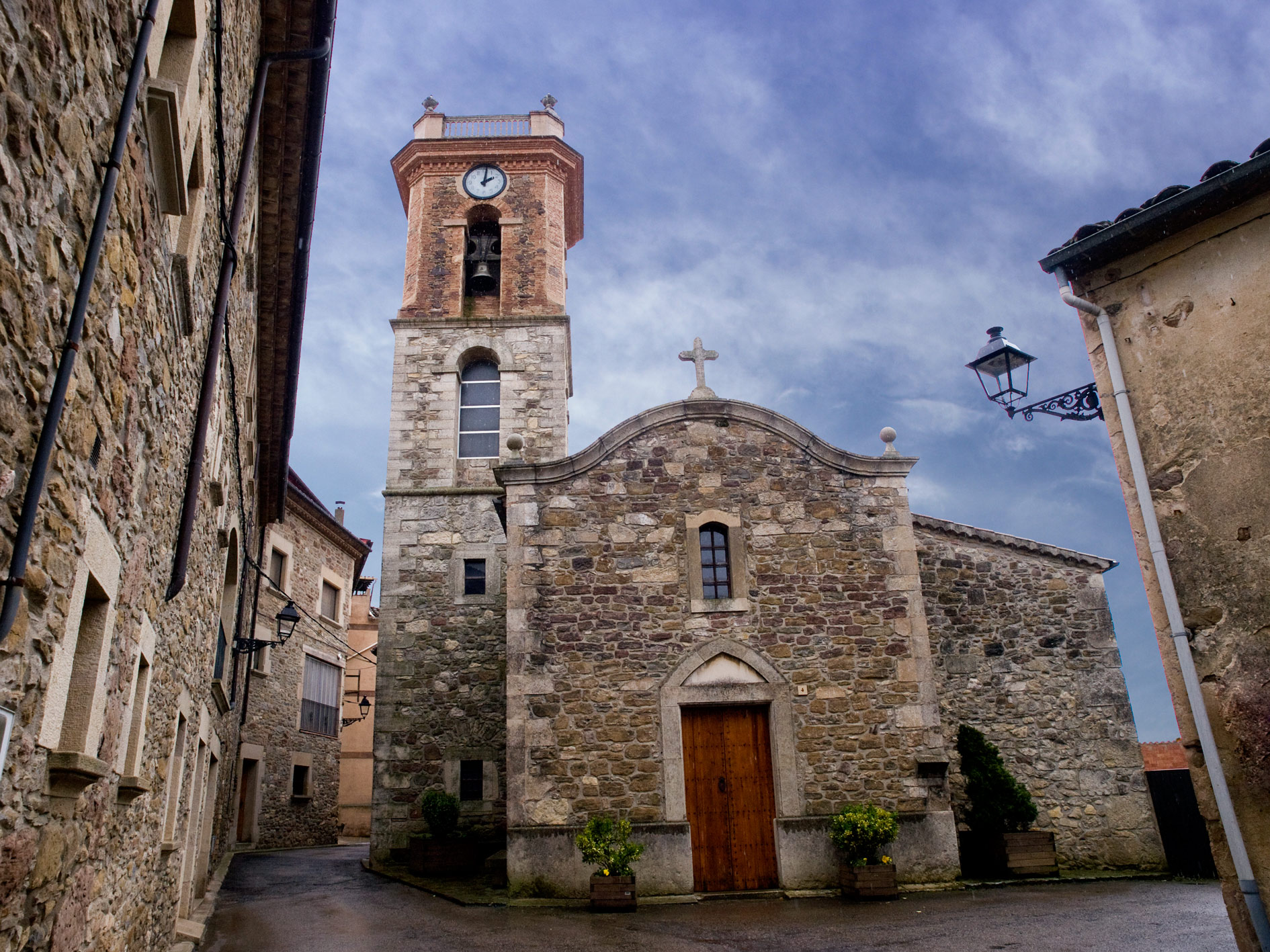
- Parochial church of Collsuspina

- Flag Coat of arms

- Location in the Province of Barcelona Location in Catalonia Location in Spain
- Coordinates: 41°49′37″N 2°10′34″E
- Country: Spain
- Community: Catalonia
- Province: Barcelona
- Comarca: Moianès

Government
  - Mayor: Oriol Batlló Farriol (2015)

Area
  - Total: 15.1 km^{2} (5.8 sq mi)

Population (2025-01-01)
  - Total: 391
  - Density: 25.9/km^{2} (67.1/sq mi)
- Website: www.collsuspina.cat

Collsuspina (Catalan pronunciation: [ˌkɔʎsusˈpinə]) is a municipality in the comarca of Moianès in Catalonia, Spain. Until May 2015 it was part of Osona.

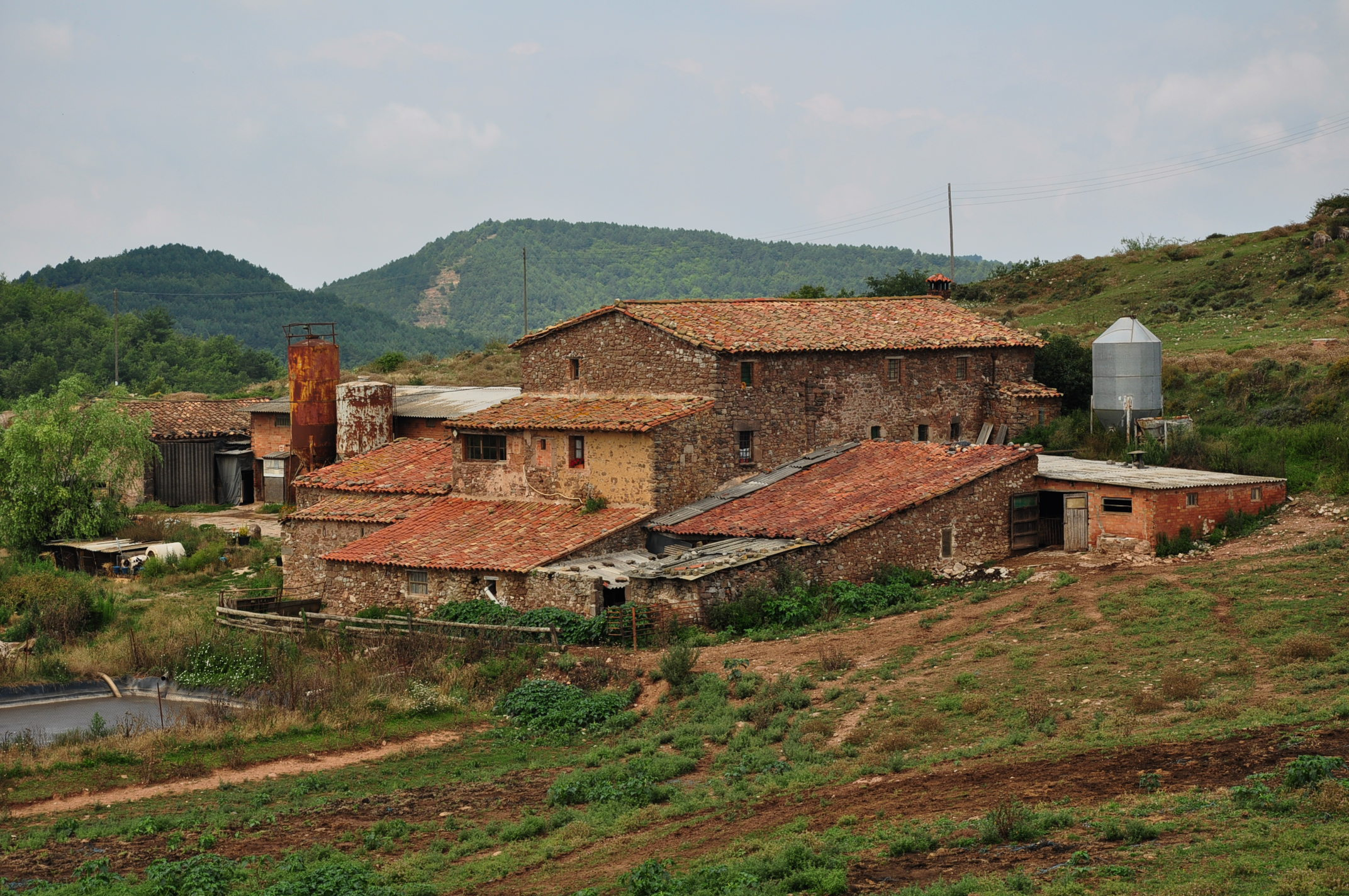
Mas Bellver, an isolated farm in the north of the municipality.
