= Castellterçol =

- Municipality
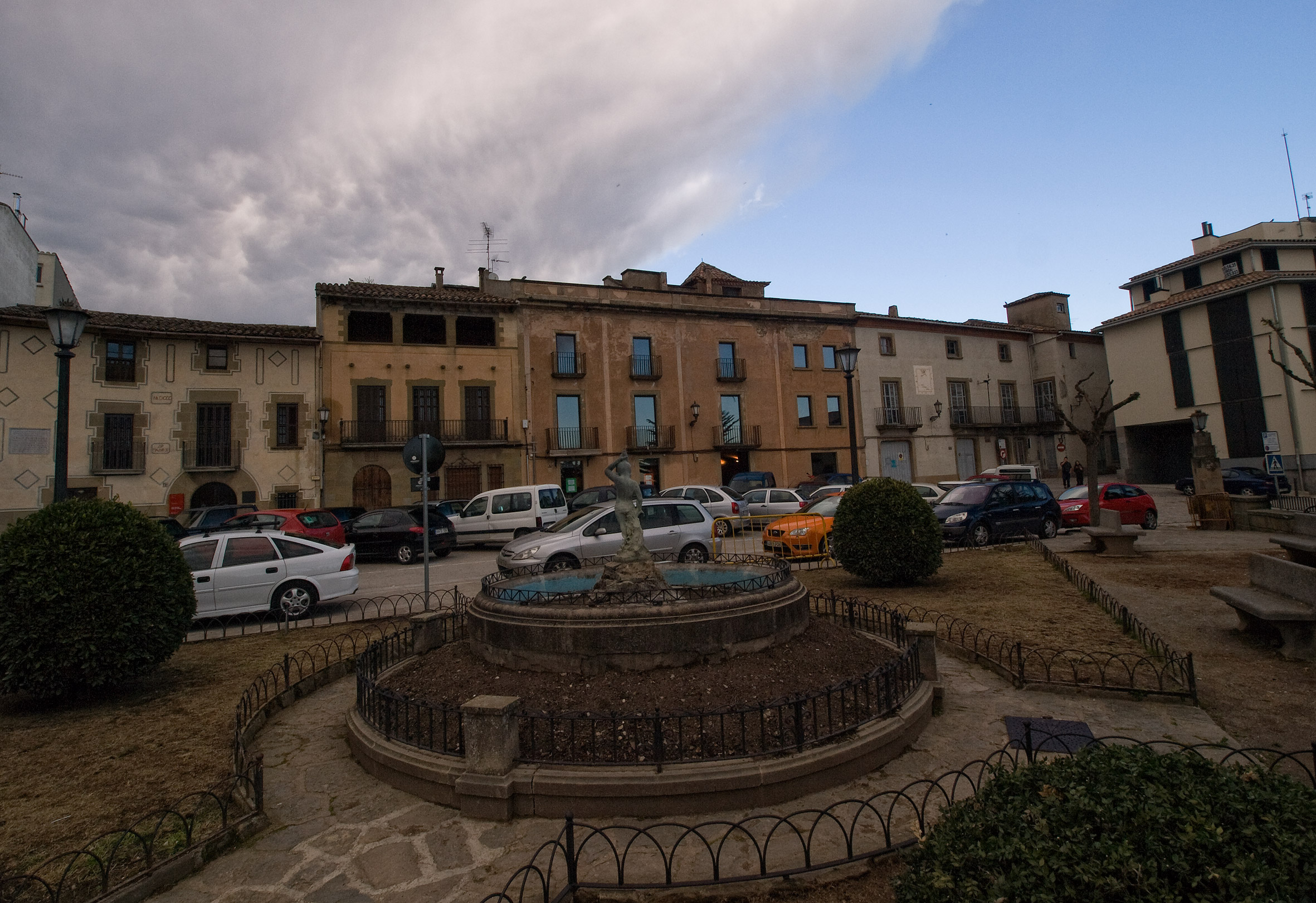
- Plaça Prat de la Riba

- Flag Coat of arms

- Location in Catalonia Castellterçol (Spain)
- Coordinates: 41°45′7″N 2°7′21″E
- Country: Spain
- Community: Catalonia
- Province: Barcelona
- Comarca: Moianès

Government
  - Mayor: Isaac Burgos Lozano (2015)

Area
  - Total: 31.9 km^{2} (12.3 sq mi)

Population (2025-01-01)
  - Total: 2,754
  - Density: 86.3/km^{2} (224/sq mi)
- Website: www.castelltersol.cat

Castellterçol (Catalan pronunciation: [kəsˌteʎtəɾˈsɔl]) is a town in Catalonia. It is in the province of Barcelona, in the comarca of Moianès; until May 2015 it was in Vallès Oriental. As of 2013, the population was 2,402.
