= Vegueria of Tarragona =

The Vegueria of Tarragona was a historical territorial entity of Catalonia (in what is now Spain) that agglutinated the counties of Tarragona. In all the moments of validity of this territorial division, the capital of the Vegueria of Tarragona has been the city of Tarragona. This city has been the genesis of all the territory.

== History ==
Tarraco constituted, since the republican period, a Roman site of first order on the territory as the capital of the Hispania Citerior (the biggest province of all the Roman Empire). The city accommodated the Concilium Provinciae, in imperial period integrated by the representatives of the seven conventi, or districts, that formed the province: Tarraco, Cartago Nova, Caesar Augusta, Clúnia, Astúrica Augusta, Lucus Augusta and Bràccara Augusta.

In 26-25 BC Augustus moved in Tarragona to direct the war against the Cantabri and the Astures. From the year 259 AD a Christian bishopric is documented in the city, and in 385 the Pope Siricius gave the metropolitan bishop of Tarragona authority over all the Hispanic provinces. At the beginning of the 5th century the commes hispaniarum resided in Tarragona.

In the Middle Ages, due to archbishop of Tarragona Bernat Tort the territory was organized. Parishes were created in the current counties of the Tarragonès, Baix Camp, Alt Camp, Priorat, Conca de Barberà, Urgell and Garrigues that depended on the Tarragonese mitre.

Alfonso II of Aragon (1162–96) named Tarragona the "capital of my kingdom". Since then, Tarragona has always been the capital of the Vegueria in mediaeval and modern periods.

From 1716 the city was the capital of the corregimiento of Tarragona, and with the establishment of the territorial division in provinces, from 1822, Tarragona has always been the capital of the counties of Tarragona. In this last decision two essential reasons had a huge weight. On the one hand, the fierce defense that in 1811 the city of Tarragona against the French armies in the called War of Spanish Independence. Tarragona accommodated women and men of all the territory and protected them in its walls. The stairs of the cathedral were the last bastion of defense of the Tarragona territory and thousands of defenders died.
