= Granera =

- Municipality
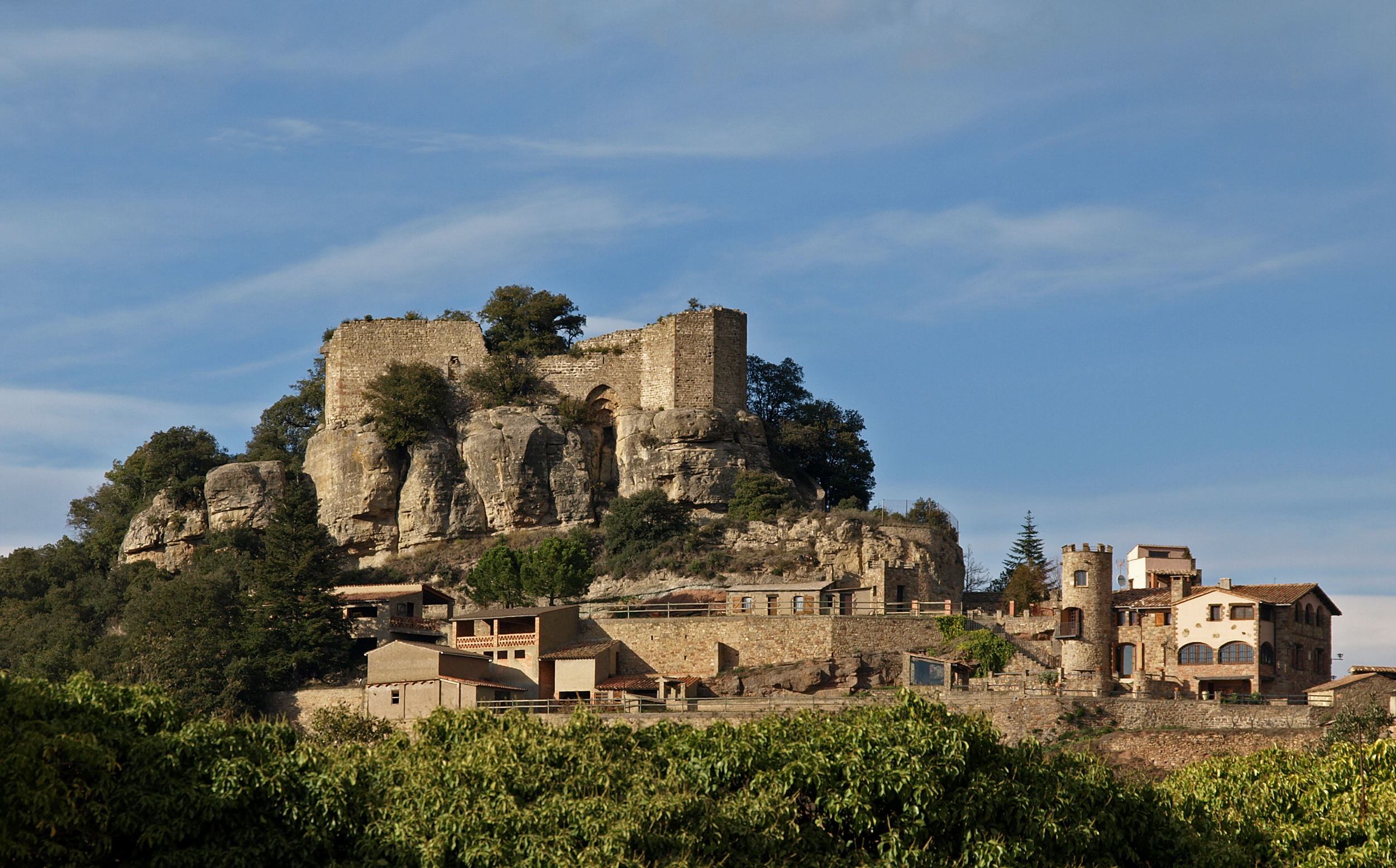
- Castle of Granera

- Coat of arms

- Location in Catalonia Granera (Spain)
- Coordinates: 41.726°N 2.057°E
- Country: Spain
- Community: Catalonia
- Province: Barcelona
- Comarca: Moianès

Government
  - Mayor: Pere Genescà Girbau (2015)

Area
  - Total: 23.7 km^{2} (9.2 sq mi)

Population (2025-01-01)
  - Total: 84
  - Density: 3.5/km^{2} (9.2/sq mi)
- Website: granera.cat

Granera (Catalan pronunciation: [gɾəˈneɾə]) is a municipality of the comarca of Moianès, in Catalonia. Until 24 May 2015 it was part of Vallès Oriental.
