= Calders =

- Municipality
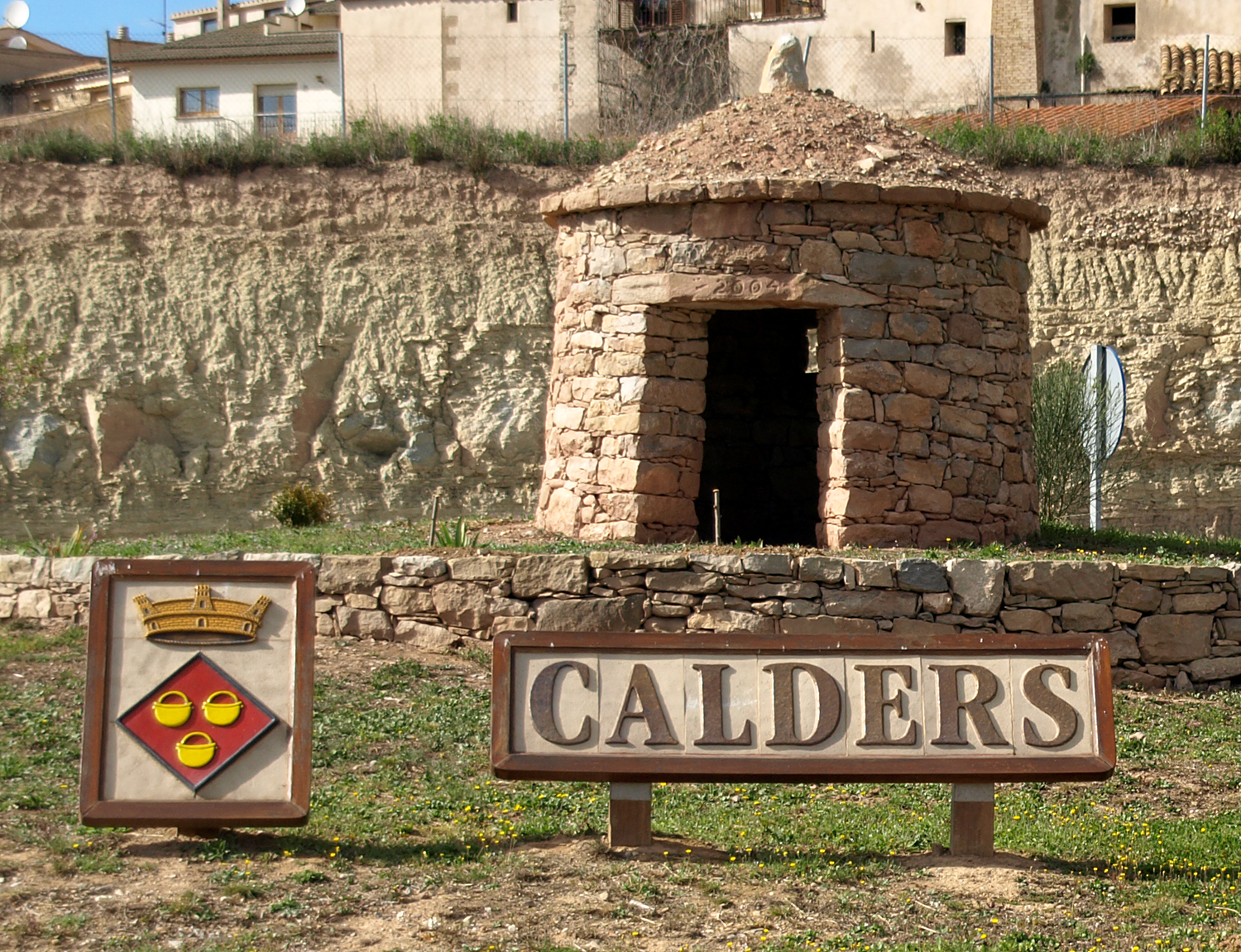
- Calders

- Flag Coat of arms

- Location in Catalonia Calders (Spain)
- Coordinates: 41°47′26″N 1°59′16″E
- Country: Spain
- Community: Catalonia
- Province: Barcelona
- Comarca: Moianès

Government
  - Mayor: Eduard Sánchez Campoy (2015)

Area
  - Total: 33.1 km^{2} (12.8 sq mi)
- Elevation: 552 m (1,811 ft)

Population (2025-01-01)
  - Total: 1,122
  - Density: 33.9/km^{2} (87.8/sq mi)
- Demonym(s): Calderí, calderina
- Website: calders.cat

Calders (Catalan pronunciation: [kəlˈdes]) is a municipality in the comarca of the Moianès in Catalonia, Spain. Until May 2015 it was part of Bages.
