= Cartographic and Geological Institute of Catalonia =

Public mapping and geological agency of Catalonia

- Institut Cartogràfic i Geològic de Catalunya

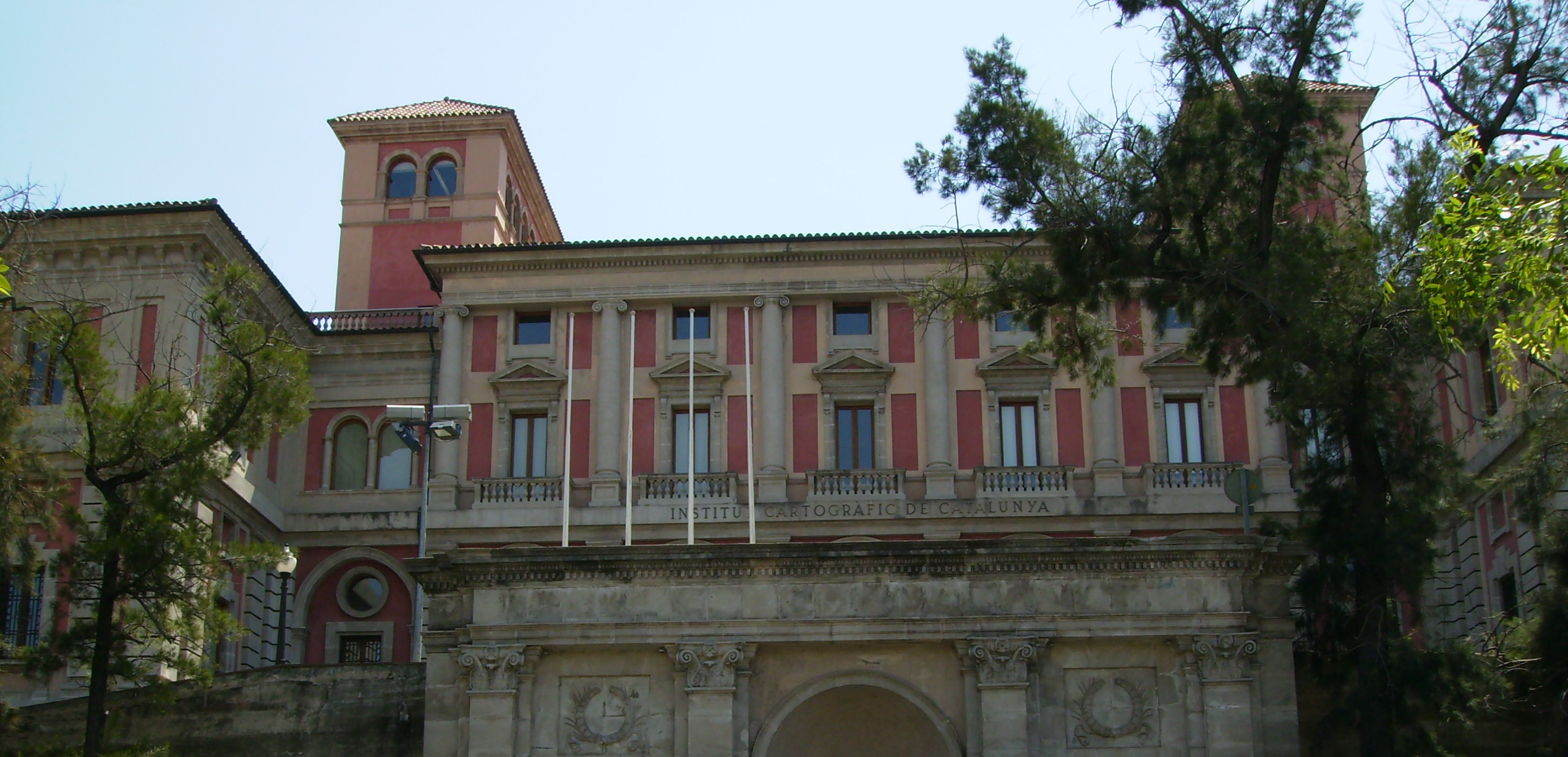
- Headquarters in Barcelona

Agency overview
- Formed: 1 February 2014; 12 years ago (merger of two predecessors)
- Preceding agencies: Cartographic Institute of Catalonia (1982–2014); Geological Institute of Catalonia (2005–2014)
- Jurisdiction: Catalonia
- Headquarters: Parc de Montjuïc, Barcelona, Catalonia, Spain
- Agency executive: Antonio Magariños Varo, Director
- Parent department: Department of Territory, Housing and Ecological Transition
- Website: www.icgc.cat/en

The Cartographic and Geological Institute of Catalonia (Catalan: Institut Cartogràfic i Geològic de Catalunya, ICGC) is a public agency of the Government of Catalonia responsible for official geodetic, cartographic and geological information in Catalonia. Its activities include aerial surveying and remote sensing, topographic and geological mapping, seismic monitoring and the assessment of geological hazards.

The institute became operational on 1 February 2014, succeeding the Cartographic Institute of Catalonia and the Geological Institute of Catalonia. It is headquartered at Parc de Montjuïc in Barcelona.

== History ==
=== Early cartographic and geological services ===
The ICGC developed from cartographic and geological institutions whose histories initially followed separate paths. Its geological tradition has roots in the late 19th century. In 1874, Jaume Almera began teaching and researching geology at the Conciliar Seminary of Barcelona, and in 1884 the Provincial Deputation of Barcelona commissioned him to prepare a geological map of the surroundings of Barcelona.

The institute's cartographic lineage began in 1915, when the Provincial Deputation of Barcelona established the Servei del Mapa Geogràfic de Catalunya ("Geographic Map Service of Catalonia"). It was the first public body in Catalonia devoted specifically to official cartography, and its principal initial task was to prepare a map of Catalonia at a scale of 1:100,000.

The Mancomunitat created the Servei Geològic de Catalunya ("Geological Survey of Catalonia") in 1916 to continue geological surveying throughout Catalonia. Directed by Marià Faura i Sans and working with the Martorell Museum, the service began preparing the 1:100,000 Geological Map of Catalonia. In 1919, the Geographic Map Service was transferred to the Mancomunitat. The Geological Survey was abolished in 1925 when the Mancomunitat was suppressed during the Dictatorship of Primo de Rivera.

During the Second Spanish Republic, the cartographic service operated as the Servei Cartogràfic de la Generalitat de Catalunya. It published twelve sheets of the 1:100,000 map of Catalonia, half of which also appeared in geological editions. Following the Spanish Civil War, cartographic work continued within the Provincial Deputation of Barcelona, while plans to establish a separate geological institute were interrupted by the war and the Francoist dictatorship.

=== Modern institutes and merger ===
Following the restoration of the Generalitat during the Spanish transition to democracy, a new Cartographic Service was established in 1978 and the Geological Survey of Catalonia was re-established in 1979. The Geological Survey assumed the functions of the Seismology Service of Catalonia in 1982, one year after the latter had been created to monitor and assess seismic activity.

In 1982, the Parliament of Catalonia established the Cartographic Institute of Catalonia (ICC), replacing the Cartographic Service and incorporating cartographic units transferred from the Provincial Deputation of Barcelona. Inaugurated in 1983, the ICC developed remote sensing and systematic base mapping, including orthophoto and topographic series at scales of 1:5,000 and 1:25,000.

The Geological Survey was incorporated into the ICC in 1997, bringing cartographic and geological functions together within the same institution. Law 19/2005 subsequently established the Geological Institute of Catalonia (IGC) as a separate public-law entity. The legislation cited the increasing specialisation of geological, geophysical and geotechnical work and its growing importance in public works, infrastructure and territorial planning.

Article 152 of Law 2/2014 created the Cartographic and Geological Institute of Catalonia by merging the ICC and IGC and transferring their functions, assets, rights and obligations to the new entity. The law also required the technical independence of its geological work to be maintained. The ICGC became operational on 1 February 2014. Its statutes, approved by the Catalan government in April 2015, defined its governing bodies and its legal, financial and administrative structure.

== Activities ==
=== Geodesy, cartography and Earth observation ===
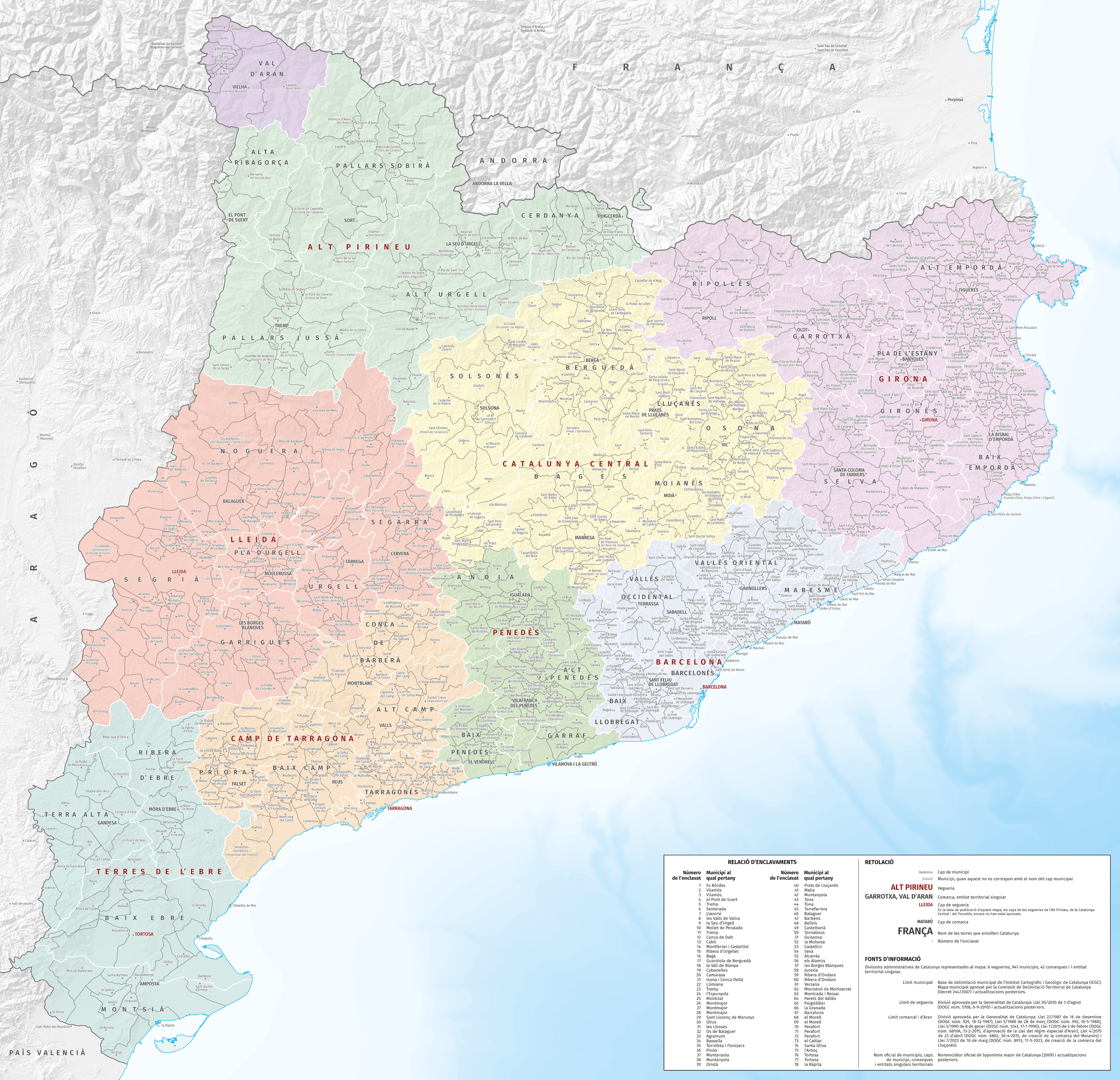
A 2025 ICGC map of Catalonia's administrative divisions

The ICGC maintains Catalonia's geodetic reference and positioning infrastructure and produces official topographic and administrative cartography. It develops and updates geographic databases used for territorial and urban planning, public works, cadastral mapping and other public services. The institute also coordinates cartographic activity with Spanish state bodies and Catalan local authorities.

The institute acquires aerial and satellite imagery for earth observation and remote sensing. Its principal products include orthophotos, lidar point clouds, digital elevation models, land-cover datasets, and base and thematic maps, which are distributed through data downloads, online viewers and web mapping services. Periodic aerial surveys are used to revise mapping and document changes in settlements, infrastructure and the natural environment. The institute's Photo Library of Catalonia contains vertical aerial imagery dating from 1942 to the present.

The ICGC manages the Spatial Data Infrastructure of Catalonia, through which geographic datasets and services from public bodies can be located, viewed and reused. In 2018, the institute announced a digital strategy based on open data and open-source software, including the publication of source code for internally developed applications. This followed the removal of download charges and mandatory registration for much of its geographic information.

=== Geological surveying and hazards ===
The ICGC performs the functions of Catalonia's public geological survey. It produces and maintains geological, geophysical, geotechnical, hydrogeological and soil information about the territory, including geological maps at different scales, three-dimensional geological models, hydrogeological maps, soil maps and geophysical datasets.

Its geological and geotechnical studies support territorial planning and the construction and assessment of public works, including roads, tunnels and viaducts. These studies may combine geology, hydrogeology, geophysics, geodesy, remote sensing and engineering methods to characterise the soil and subsoil and evaluate their suitability for proposed infrastructure.

The institute operates Catalonia's seismic monitoring network and publishes information about recorded earthquakes. It also compiles inventories and prepares hazard assessments and maps concerning flooding, landslides, rockfalls, torrential flows, subsidence and ground collapses, avalanches and seismic activity. Its 1:25,000 Map for the Prevention of Geological Hazards is a multi-hazard cartographic series intended to identify areas where more detailed investigation may be required for urban development and infrastructure planning.

=== Map Library ===
The ICGC administers the Cartoteca de Catalunya (Map Library of Catalonia), a specialist map library and research collection containing maps, atlases, books and aerial photographs. Its holdings date from the 15th century to the present and cover Catalonia, other parts of Europe and the wider world.

The Digital Map Library provides online access to digitised maps, photographs, books and other collection material. Its portal provides more than 92,000 high-resolution files for consultation and download. The library also undertakes the georeferencing of historical maps and incorporates their metadata into Catalonia's spatial data infrastructure, allowing collections from different institutions to be searched geographically and compared with modern cartography.
