= Moianès =

- Comarca
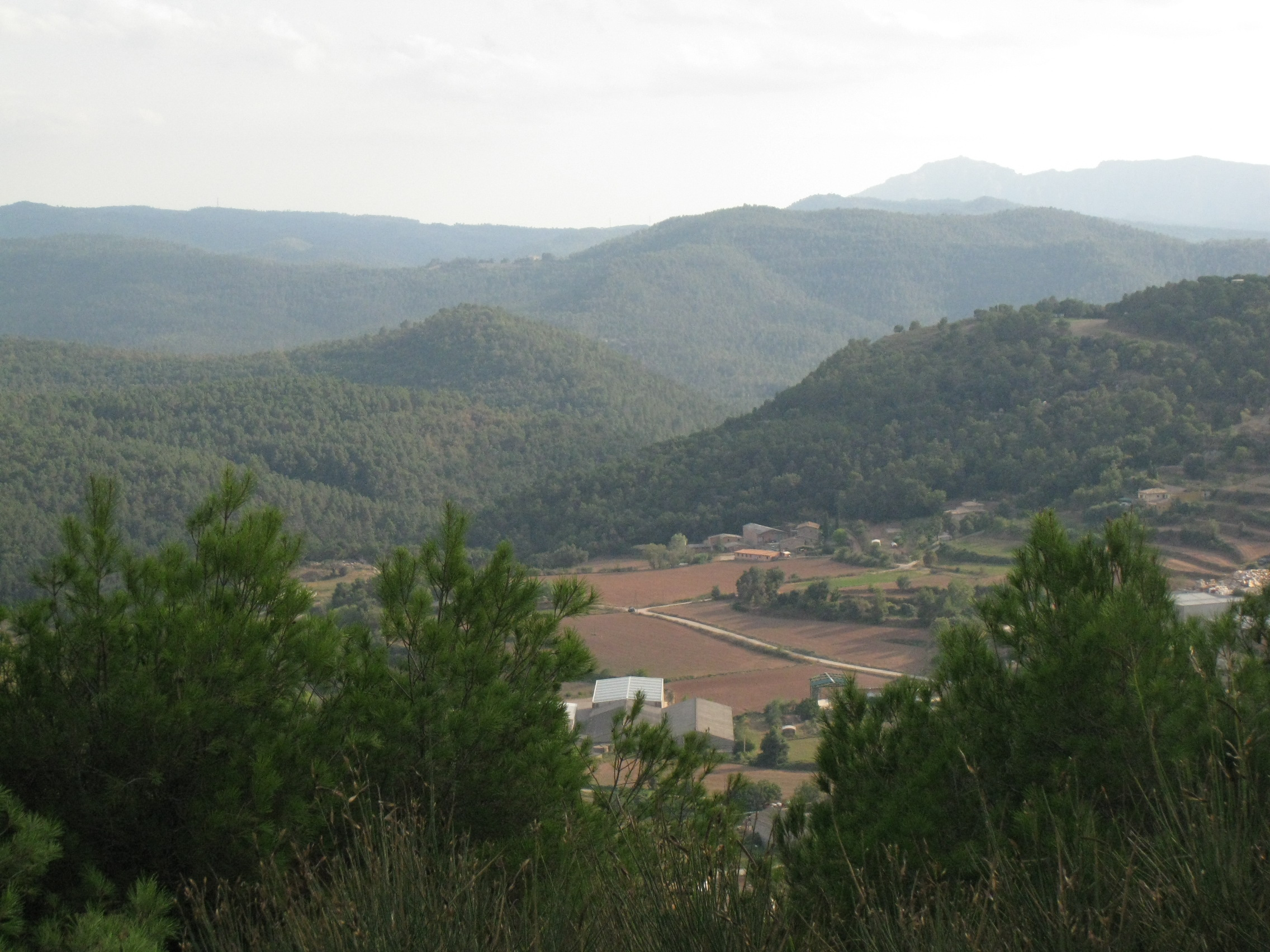
- Moianès rural landscape

- Moianès in Catalonia
- Coordinates: 41.8°N 2.1°E
- Country: Spain
- Autonomous community: Catalonia
- Province: Barcelona
- Region: Central Catalonia
- Capital: Moià
- Municipalities: List: Calders, Castellcir, Castellterçol, Collsuspina, Granera, L'Estany, Moià, Monistrol de Calders, Sant Quirze Safaja, Santa Maria d'Oló

Government
  - Body: Moianès Comarcal Council
  - President: Laia Bonells (ERC)

Area
  - Total: 337.9 km^{2} (130.5 sq mi)

Population (2014)
  - Total: 13,056
  - Density: 38.64/km^{2} (100.1/sq mi)
- Time zone: UTC+1 (CET)
  - Summer (DST): UTC+2 (CEST)
- Website: ccmoianes.cat

Moianès (Catalan pronunciation: [muјəˈnɛs]) is a comarca in the central region of Catalonia, Spain. Its capital is the town of Moià.

It became a comarca in May 2015, following approval in a local referendum and by the Parliament of Catalonia. Its 10 municipalities were in the comarques of Bages, Osona, and Vallès Oriental. It had previously been recommended in 2000 in the "Report on the revision of Catalonia's territorial organisation model", known as the "Roca Report", commissioned by the Catalan government. Before it was given legal status, Moianès was considered a "natural comarca"—a distinct geographic region—comprising the eponymous Moianès Plateau.

== Municipalities ==
Municipality	Population (2014)	Area km^{2}
Calders	949	33.1
Castellcir	718	34.2
Castellterçol	2,400	31.9
Collsuspina	338	15.1
L'Estany	407	10.2
Granera	80	23.7
Moià	5,760	75.3
Monistrol de Calders	695	22.0
Sant Quirze Safaja	644	26.2
Santa Maria d'Oló	1,065	66.2
• Total: 10	13,056	337.9
