= Sant Quirze Safaja =

- Municipality
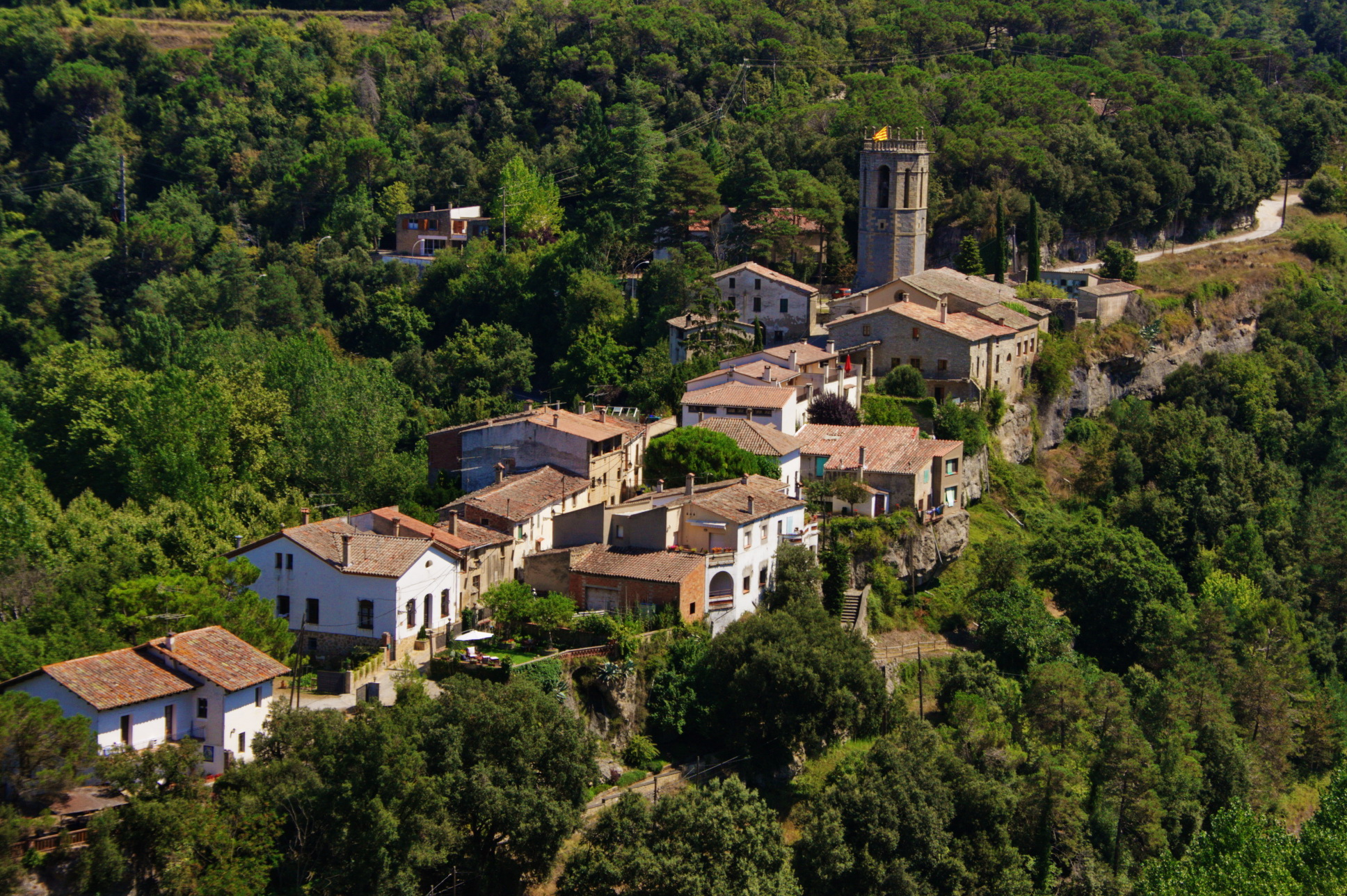
- Sant Quirze Safaja with its church

- Flag Coat of arms

- Location in Catalonia Sant Quirze Safaja (Spain)
- Coordinates: 41°43′49″N 2°9′16″E
- Country: Spain
- Community: Catalonia
- Province: Barcelona
- Comarca: Moianès

Government
  - Mayor: Anna Guixà Fisas (2015)

Area
  - Total: 26.2 km^{2} (10.1 sq mi)

Population (2025-01-01)
  - Total: 663
  - Density: 25.3/km^{2} (65.5/sq mi)
- Website: www.santquirzesafaja.cat

Sant Quirze Safaja (Old Catalan for 'Saint Cyr the-Beech-Wood'; Catalan pronunciation: [ˈsaŋ ˈkiɾzə səˈfaʒə]) is a municipality in the comarca of Moianès in Catalonia, Spain. Since May 2015 it has been part of the new comarca of Moianès; previously it was in Vallès Oriental.
