= Santa Maria d'Oló =

- Municipality
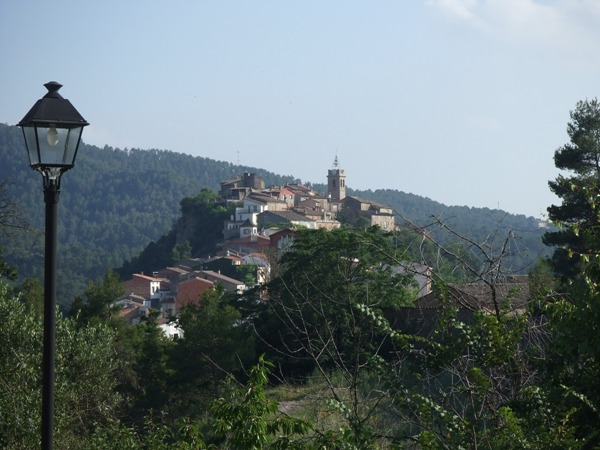
- Santa Maria d'Oló

- Flag Coat of arms

- Location in Catalonia Santa Maria d'Oló (Spain)
- Coordinates: 41°52′30″N 2°2′10″E
- Country: Spain
- Community: Catalonia
- Province: Barcelona
- Comarca: Moianès

Government
  - Mayor: Enric Güell Sabata (2015)

Area
  - Total: 66.2 km^{2} (25.6 sq mi)

Population (2025-01-01)
  - Total: 1,099
  - Density: 16.6/km^{2} (43.0/sq mi)
- Website: www.olo.cat

Santa Maria d'Oló (Catalan pronunciation: [ˈsantə məˈɾi.ə ðuˈlo]) is a village in the province of Barcelona and autonomous community of Catalonia, Spain. The municipality covers an area of 66.18 square kilometres (25.55 sq mi) and the population in 2014 was 1,065. Since May 2015 it has been part of the new comarca of Moianès; previously it was in Bages.
