= Camp de Tarragona =

Vegueria (region) of Catalonia

Coordinates: 41°08′N 1°15′E

- Vegueria
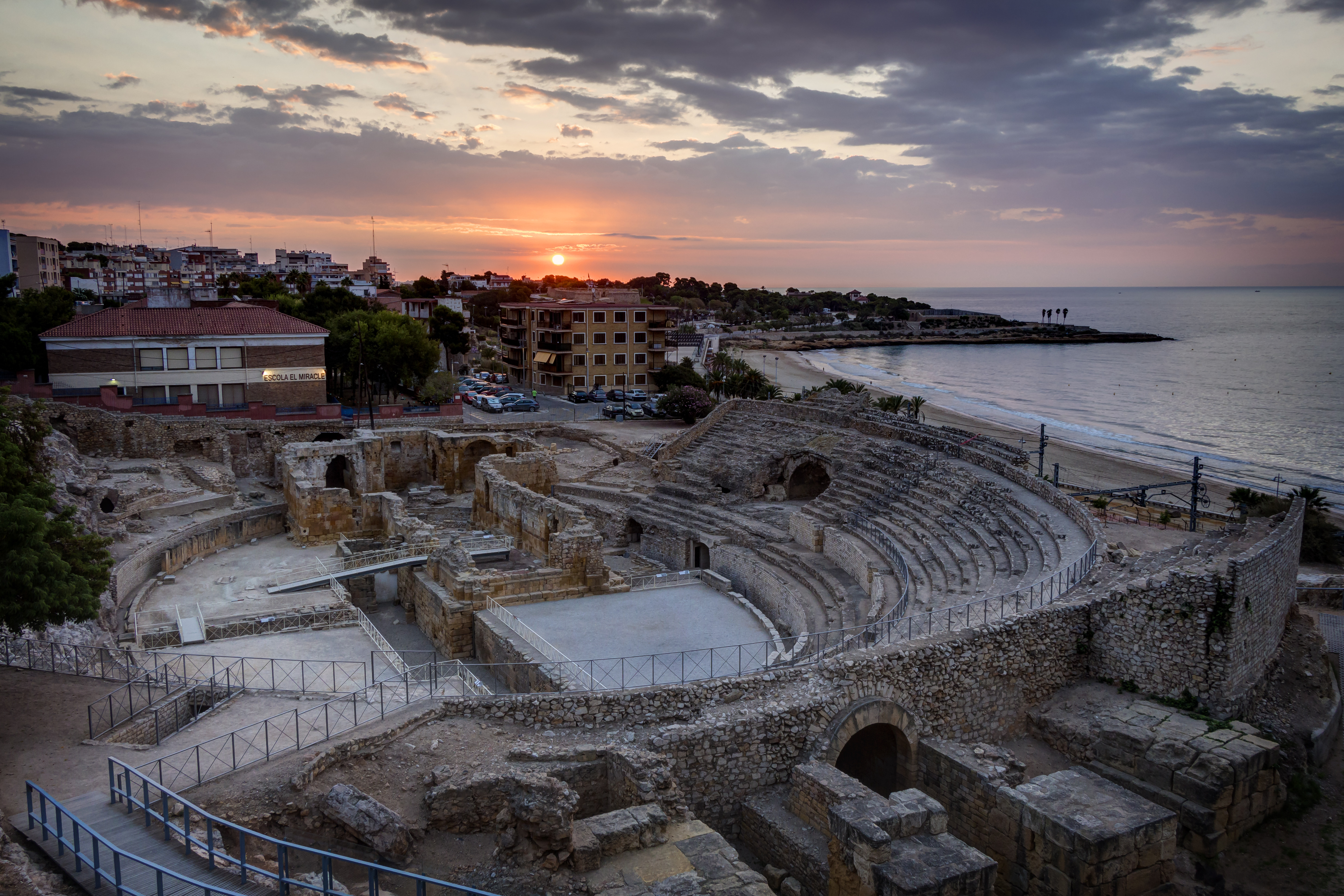
- The Tarragona Amphitheatre

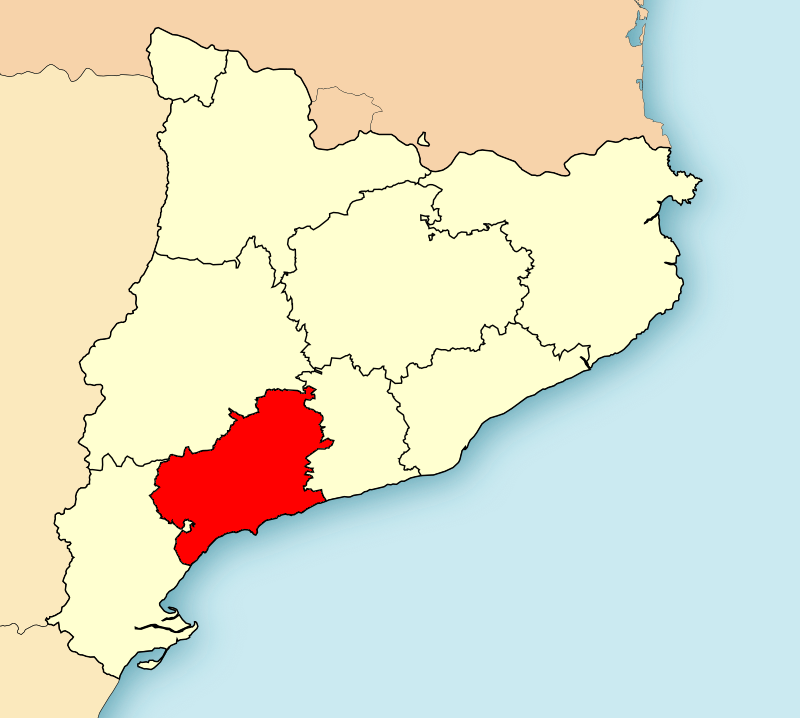
- Sovereign state: Spain
- Community: Catalonia
- Capital: Tarragona
- Counties: Tarragonès; Alt Camp; Baix Camp; Conca de Barberà; Priorat

Area
  - Total: 2,703 km^{2} (1,044 sq mi)

Population (2025)
  - Total: 564,162
  - Density: 208.7/km^{2} (540.6/sq mi)

Camp de Tarragona (Catalan pronunciation: [ˈkam də tərəˈɣonə]) is a natural and historical region, as well as one of the nine regions (vegueries) of Catalonia. It is the third most populated region, with 564,162 inhabitants as of 2025.

The region includes the counties of Tarragonès, Alt Camp, Baix Camp, Conca de Barberà and Priorat. It borders to the east with Penedès and Central Catalonia, to the north with Ponent and to the west with Terres de l'Ebre.

The capital is the city of Tarragona.

== History ==
The modern Camp de Tarragona roughly follows the old vegueria of Tarragona, which was abolished in 1716, following the Nueva Planta decrees, and replaced by the Castilian corregimientos.

The region was defined as a statistical region in 1987 in the Territorial Planning Laws approved by the Parliament of Catalonia, becoming a vegueria in January 2010. Prior to the region's official establishment, several organisations and citizens of Reus had requested that it be named simply Camp and that it share its capital with the city of Reus, for decentralisation and economic purposes.

== Geography ==
The region's most populous settlements are Tarragona, Reus, Valls and Cambrils. Salou is a key resort destination.

Camp de Tarragona is located in the south of the country, just above the Terres de l'Ebre. It includes a central plain, surrounded by the Pre-Coastal Range mountain chain on the west and in the north, with the Mediterranean sand beaches of the Costa Daurada on the east and limited in the south by the Coll de Balaguer.

The main rivers are the Francolí, the Gaià and the Foix.

The region is regarded as the second metropolitan area of Catalonia, hosting the most important chemical complex in Spain as well as one of the main ports. Among the most distinctive agricultural produce of the region are hazelnuts, olives, wine and fish. It is also one of the major tourist areas in Catalonia, mainly due to the variety of beaches, holiday attractions like the remains of the Roman important past of Tarragona (one of the UNESCO World Heritage Sites in Spain), samples of the Catalan Modernisme style (particularly in Reus, Gaudí's hometown) and PortAventura World (PortAventura Park, the most visited theme park in Spain, Ferrari Land and also the PortAventura Caribe Aquatic Park).

== Comarques ==
Camp de Tarragona is composed of five different comarques.

| Comarca | Capital | Population (2025) | Area (km^{2}) | Map |
|---|---|---|---|---|
| Alt Camp | Valls | 47,138 | 538 | |
| Baix Camp | Reus | 207,529 | 697 | |
| Conca de Barberà | Montblanc | 20,748 | 650 | |
| Priorat | Falset | 9,415 | 499 | |
| Tarragonès | Tarragona | 279,332 | 319 | |

== Transport ==
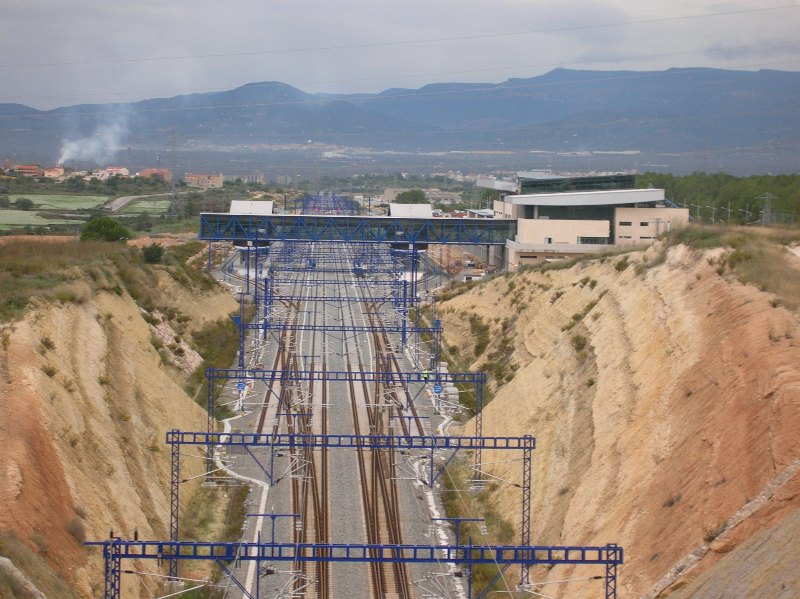
The Camp de Tarragona railway station in the town of La Secuita.

Camp de Tarragona railway station, serving high-speed trains, is located between the Tarragonès towns of La Secuita and Perafort, in the centre of the Tarragona-Reus-Valls area. Salou - Port Aventura station hosts Iberian-gauge, regional trains which terminate at the station in Salou.

TramCamp or Tramvia del Camp de Tarragona is a planned, standard-gauge tramway to link several municipalities within its namesake region. The project will be built in two stages. The first stage will link Vila-seca, Salou and Cambrils using the right-of-way of a discontinued Iberian-gauge line. The second phase will extend the tram network to Reus and Tarragona with a branch to Reus Airport. In July 2025, Stadler was announced as the preferred bidder to supply seven Tramlink vehicles to FGC for the TramCamp project.

== Economy ==
The GDP of Camp de Tarragona makes up 7% of Catalonia's. The productive structure is not homogeneous in the region, e.g. the primary sector is more important in Priorat and in Conca de Barberà than in the other counties. However, they all share wine as one of the main products of the sector. In terms of industry, in Alt Camp the paper sector plays a predominant role, whereas in Baix Camp it is the energy sector and in Tarragonès the chemical sector.

Proportion of total GDP accounted for by each sector in the region (2013)
| County | Natural sector | Industrial sector | Construction sector | Service sector |
|---|---|---|---|---|
| Alt Camp | 4.70% | 34.77% | 7.02% | 53.51% |
| Baix Camp | 1.96% | 25.91% | 7.44% | 64.69% |
| Conca de Barberà | 6.91% | 41.18% | 7.61% | 44.30% |
| Priorat | 13.35% | 18.63% | 13.42% | 54.60% |
| Tarragonès | 0.64% | 22.47% | 7.03% | 69.86% |

Tourism is particularly significant in the coastal townships, namely Salou and Cambrils. The Costa Daurada is Camp de Tarragona's main tourist brand, and in addition to its beaches, it also houses the Port Aventura theme park.

Camp de Tarragona also has a public university, the University of Rovira i Virgili (URV), with facilities in the municipalities of Tarragona, Reus and Vila-seca. Founded in 1991, it currently offers a wide range of degrees and masters courses to over 11,000 students.

== Local media ==
=== Television ===
Although the most viewed channels are the ones broadcasting for the whole of Catalonia, such as those of Televisió de Catalunya or RTVE, Camp de Tarragona has two multiplexes for local broadcasting, with coverage for the western and eastern areas of the region each.

| Broadcast area | Channel name | Type | Headquarters | Multiplex |
|---|---|---|---|---|
| Baix Camp Priorat | Canal Reus TV | Commercial | Reus (Baix Camp) | TL01T |
| Baix Camp Priorat | Televisió de Vandellòs | Public (Vandellòs i l'Hospitalet de l'Infant) | Vandellòs i l'Hospitalet de l'Infant (Baix Camp) | TL01T |
| Alt Camp Conca de Barberà Tarragonès | TAC 12 | Public (city of Tarragona) | Tarragona (Tarragonès) | TL02T |
