= Monistrol de Calders =

- Municipality
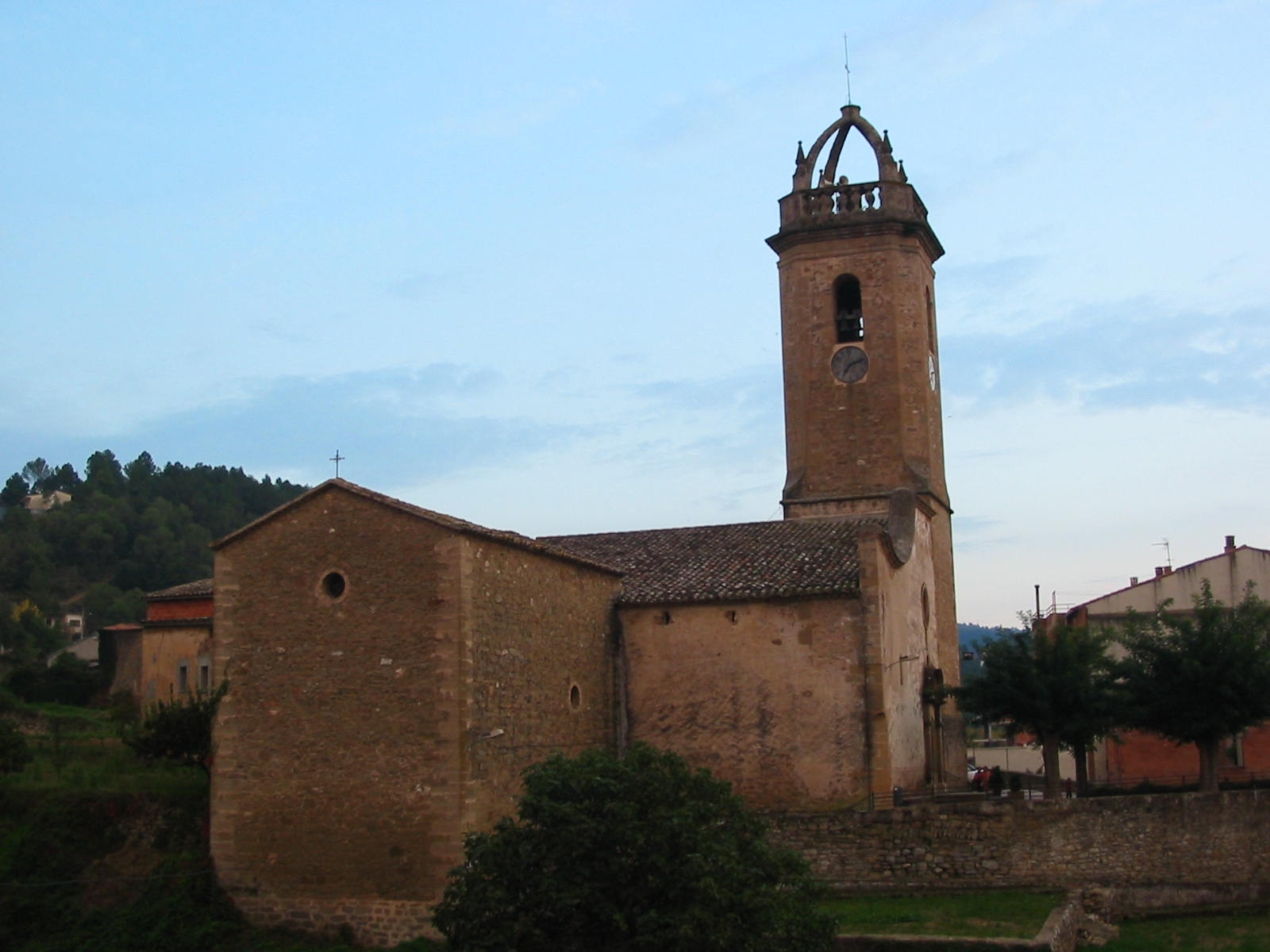

- Flag Coat of arms

- Location in Catalonia Monistrol de Calders (Spain)
- Coordinates: 41°45′38″N 2°0′51″E
- Country: Spain
- Community: Catalonia
- Province: Barcelona
- Comarca: Moianès

Government
  - Mayor: Ramon Vancells Casacuberta (2015)

Area
  - Total: 22.0 km^{2} (8.5 sq mi)

Population (2025-01-01)
  - Total: 764
  - Density: 34.7/km^{2} (89.9/sq mi)
- Website: www.monistroldecalders.cat

Monistrol de Calders (Catalan pronunciation: [munisˈtɾɔl də kəlˈdes]) is a village in the province of Barcelona and autonomous community of Catalonia, Spain. The municipality covers an area of 21.96 square kilometres (8.48 sq mi) and the population in 2014 was 695. Since May 2015 it has been part of the new comarca of Moianès; previously it was in Bages.
