= Moià =

- Municipality
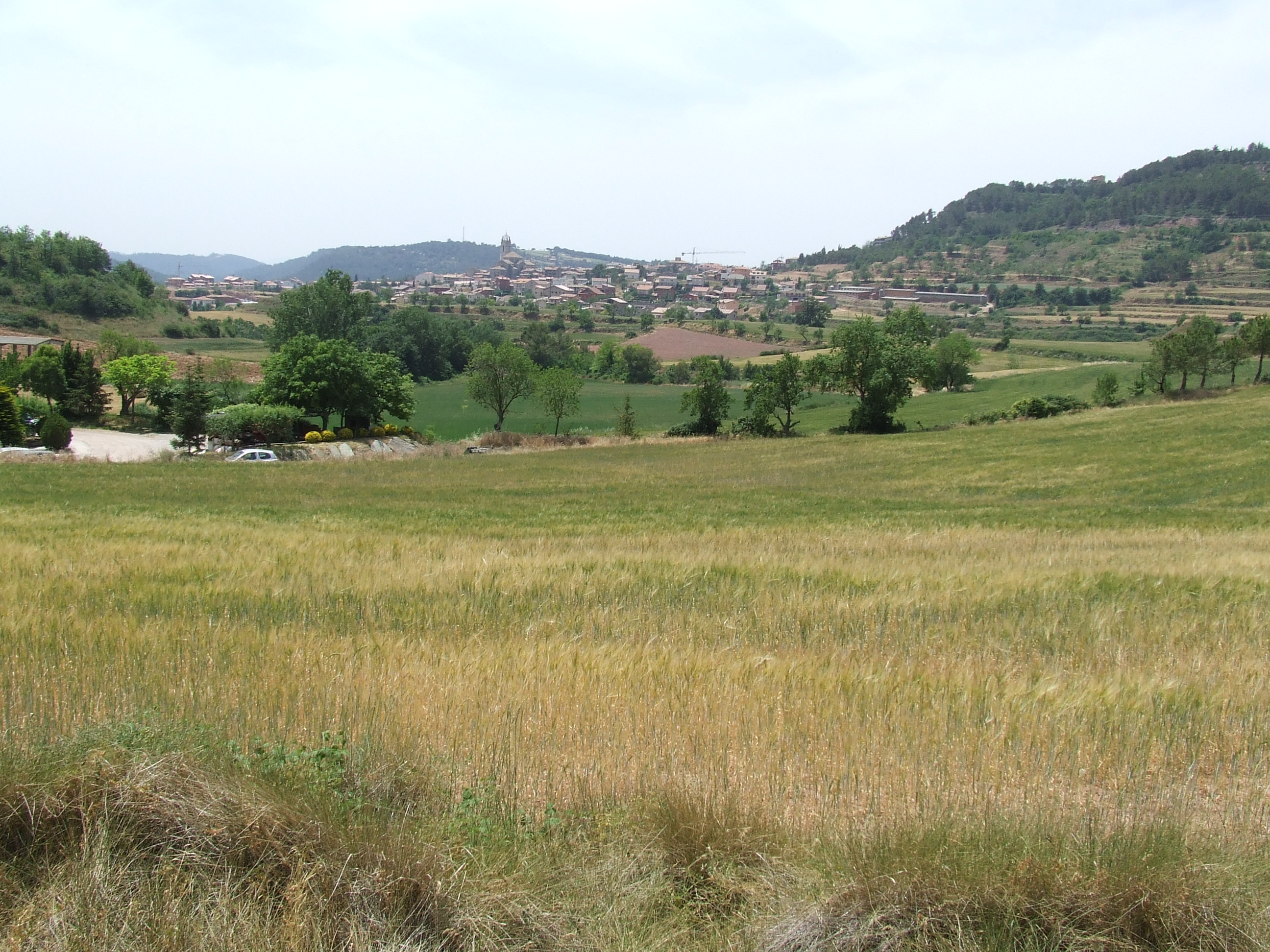

- Coat of arms

- Location in Catalonia Moià (Spain)
- Coordinates: 41°48′47″N 2°5′50″E
- Country: Spain
- Community: Catalonia
- Province: Barcelona
- Comarca: Moianès

Government
  - Mayor: Dionís Guiteras Rubio (2015)

Area
  - Total: 75.3 km^{2} (29.1 sq mi)

Population (2025-01-01)
  - Total: 6,828
  - Density: 90.7/km^{2} (235/sq mi)
- Climate: Cfb
- Website: www.moia.cat

Moià (Catalan pronunciation: [muˈja]) (Spanish: Moyá) is a municipality in the comarca of Moianès, Catalonia, Spain. Since May 2015 it has been the capital of the new comarca of Moianès; previously it was in Bages.
