= Vegueria =

Internal administrative territorial jurisdiction of Catalonia

Vegueries of Catalonia
- The eight vegueries of Catalonia and the autonomous Val d'Aran as of 2025.
- Category: Regional government (de jure); Service distribution regions; Statistical regions
- Location: Catalonia
- Found in: Autonomous community
- Created by: Catalan Vegueries Law
- Number: 8 (as of 2025)
- Populations: 65,998–5,066,684
- Government: Vegueria council (de jure)
- Subdivisions: Counties and municipalities

A vegueria (Catalan pronunciation: [bəɣəˈɾi.ə]), plural vegueries, is the highest-level regional division of Catalonia. Each vegueria is further divided into comarques and municipalities. As of 2025, the Catalan Vegueries Law divides the territory into eight vegueries. The autonomous Aran Valley, considered a "unique territorial entity", is not part of any vegueria.

The vegueries system is based on the feudal administrative territorial jurisdiction of the vegueries "vicariates" of the Principality of Catalonia, which was abolished with the Nueva Planta decrees of 1716. Preceding the vegueries is the division into ‘functional territorial areas’ in 1995, now mostly identical to the vegueries, except for the merger of the Val d'Aran and Alt Pirineu into a single Alt Pirineu i Aran region for statistical purposes. The current administrative division was established by the Statute of Autonomy of Catalonia of 2006 with two functions: an inter-municipal government and the arrangement of the services from the Generalitat de Catalunya.

Although the vegueries are intended to become Catalonia's only first-level administrative division and a full replacement for the four diputacions of the official provinces of Catalonia within the Spanish system in the future and create a council for each vegueria, the latter is currently still used administratively at state level, as any changes to the State's provinces were ruled to violate the Spanish Constitution. Thus, in practice, despite being official, vegueries are not allowed to carry the administrative powers of the provinces and currently remain only usable for similar territorial deployments to those carried out by the areas, e.g. government services, weather reports, commercial distribution, media coverage, curfew during the COVID-19 pandemic, television frequencies, etc.

== List ==
Location	Vegueria	Capital city	Population (1 Jan 2024)	Date approved
	Alt Pirineu	La Seu d'Urgell (Note: Following the vegueries law, the regions of Alt Pirineu, Central Catalonia and Penedès have their most populated cities as their de facto capitals until a law determines them.)	65,998	July 2006
	Barcelona	Barcelona	5,066,684	April 2010
	Camp de Tarragona	Tarragona	555,957	January 2010
	Catalunya Central	Manresa	427,296	September 2008
	Girona	Girona	804,851	October 2010
	Lleida	Lleida	375,964	July 2007
	Penedès	Vilanova i la Geltrú	517,499	February 2017
	Terres de l'Ebre	Tortosa	187,437	August 2010

== History ==
=== Origins and functions ===
The origins of the vegueria go back to the era of the Carolingian Empire, when vicars (Latin: vicarii, singular vicarius) were installed beneath the counts in the Spanish March. The office of a vicar was a vicariate (Latin: vicariatus), and his territory was a vicaria. All these Latin terms of Carolingian administration evolved in the Catalan language even as they disappeared in the rest of Europe. The Catalan terms were even subsequently Latinised: vicarius → vigerius.

The functions of the medieval vegueria were feudal, and it was probably initially hereditary. The veguer was appointed by his feudal lord, the count, and was accountable to him. He was the military commander of his vegueria (and thus keeper of the publicly owned castles), the chief justice of the same district, and the man in charge of the public finances (the fisc) of the region entrusted to him. As time wore on, the functions of the veguer became more and more judicial. He held a cort del veguer or de la veguería with its own seal. The cort had authority in all matter save those relating to the feudal aristocracy. It commonly heard pleas of the crown, civil, and criminal cases. The veguer did, however, retain some military functions as well: he was the commander of the militia and the superintendent of royal castles. His job was law and order and the maintenance of the king's peace: in many respects an office analogous to that of the sheriff in England.

=== Historical vegueries ===
Vegueries of Catalonia in 1304 (Cerdanya and Rosselló had been integrated to the Kingdom of Majorca in 1276, only to be later reunited to the Principality in 1344)

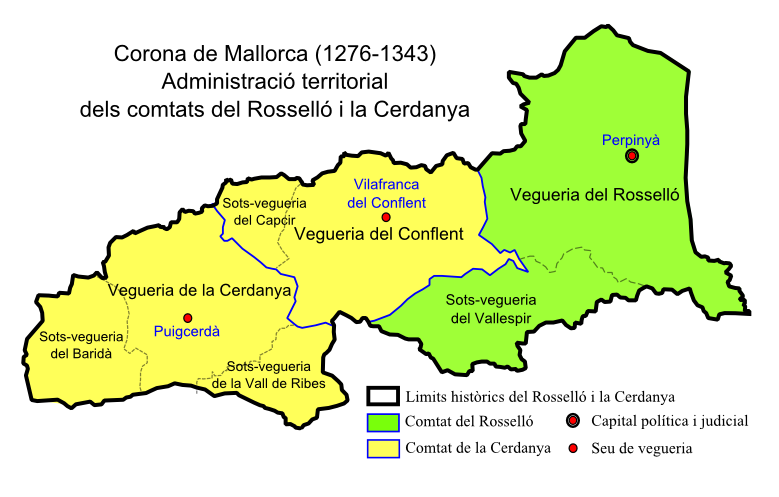
Vegueries and sotsvegueries of the Counties of Cerdanya and Rosselló under the Kingdom of Majorca (1276–1344)

At the end of the twelfth century in Catalonia, there were twelve vegueries. By the end of the reign of Peter the Great (1285), there were seventeen, and by the time of James the Just, there were twenty-one. Some of the larger vegueries included one or more sotsvegueries (subvigueries), which had a significant degree of autonomy.

While the Principality of Catalonia continued to use vegueries as subdivisions of counties, elsewhere in the Iberian Peninsula there were the merináticos (Kingdom of Aragon) and the corregimientos (Kingdom of Castile) whose functions were similar to those of the Catalan vegueries.

When the Kingdom of Sicily became a Catalan-run state, it was not subdivided into vegueries, since a similar Italian institution was already entrenched there: that of the capitania and the capità. The capità had similar to identical functions as the veguer. When the Catalans conquered the Duchy of Athens, they subdivided that duchy into three vegueries: Athens, Thebes, and Livadia. In the Duchy of Neopatras which the Catalans conquered in 1319, the institution of the capità appeared instead of the vigeriate, but the captaincies (Siderokastron, Neopatras, and Salona) were similar to identical in function to the vegueries of Athens. In Athens, the offices of captain and veguer were often held by the same individual as capitaneus seu vigerius and variants. Once the Aragonese crown had finally subdued most of the Kingdom of Sardinia to their rule by the end of the fourteenth century, they had subdivided its government into vegueries. All the vegueries of the Catalan possessions were, by the Usages of Barcelona, constrained to be held for only three years by any individual. In practice, some kings ignored this. In Athens, a vicar general on the Italian model was instituted above the veguers.

The twelve Catalan corregimientos, from 1716 to 1833

The four Catalan provinces since 1833

Catalan vegueries have changed their limits throughout history, and there has not always been the same number of them. The vegueries of Catalonia at the time of James the Just were:

- Tortosa
- Tarragona
- Montblanc
- Barcelona (including the Vallès sotsvegueria)
- Osona
- Berguedà (including the Manresa sotsvegueria)
- Bages (including the Moianés sotsvegueria)
- Vilafranca del Penedès (including the Igualada and Piera sotsvegueries)
- Girona
- Besalú
- Camprodon
- La Ral
- Ripollès
- Tàrrega
- Lleida (including the Balaguer sotsvegueria)
- Cervera (including the Agramunt and Prats del Rei sotsvegueries)
- Ribagorça
- Pallars
- Camarasa
- Rosselló (including the Vallespir sotsvegueria)
- Conflent (including the Capcir sotsvegueria)
- Cerdanya (including the Ribes and Baridà sotsvegueries)

Later, during the fourteenth and fifteenth centuries, four more vegueries were created:

- Urgell
- Balaguer
- Agramunt
- Lluçanès

Vegueries were officially abolished in 1716, when the vegueries were replaced by 12 corregimientos, a historical Castilian administrative division. In 1833, the new Spanish territorial division divided Spain into provinces, subdividing Catalonia in four (Barcelona, Lleida, Tarragona and Girona), which did not adequate to the comarques, but outside of minor differences remains in use today.

=== Second Spanish Republic ===
Catalan regions, from 1936 to 1939

During the Second Spanish Republic, after Catalonia obtained an autonomous government, it was divided into nine regions, which, in turn, were subdivided into comarques. The organisation was as follows:

- Region 1, the capital was Barcelona and comprised the following comarques: Baix Llobregat, Barcelonès, Maresme, Vallès Occidental and Vallès Oriental.
- Region 2, the capital was Girona and comprised the following comarques: Alt Empordà, Baix Empordà, Garrotxa, Gironès, and Selva (Pla de l'Estany, newly created in 1987, was back then included in this region).
- Region 3, the capital was Tarragona and comprised the following comarques: Alt Camp, Alt Penedès, Baix Penedès, Garraf and Tarragonès.
- Region 4, the capital was Reus and comprised the following comarques: Baix Camp, la Conca de Barberà, Priorat and Ribera d'Ebre.
- Region 5, the capital was Tortosa and comprised the following comarques: Baix Ebre, Montsià and Terra Alta.
- Region 6, the capital was Vic and comprised the following comarques: Baixa Cerdanya, Osona and el Ripollès.
- Region 7, the capital was Manresa and comprised the following comarques: Anoia, Bages, Berguedà and Solsonès.
- Region 8, the capital was Lleida and comprised the following comarques: Garrigues, Noguera, Urgell, Segarra and Segrià (Pla d'Urgell, newly created in 1987, was back then included in this region).
- Region 9, the capital was Tremp and comprised the following comarques: Alt Urgell, Pallars Jussà, Pallars Sobirà and the Aran Valley (Alta Ribagorça, newly created in 1987, was back then included in this region).

In 1937, a government decree reinstated the name of vegueries, but they were abolished by the Francoist regime at the end of the Spanish Civil War.

=== After the transition to democracy ===
Catalan regional plan of 1995, used as the basis for different vegueries projects.: Àmbit metropolità; Alt Pirineu i Aran; Tarragona; Comarques Centrals; Comarques Gironines; Ponent; Terres de l'Ebre

Following Franco's death and Spain's transition to democracy, the Catalan comarques were reinstated by the Catalan government in 1987, although the vegueries have yet to be formally recognised by the State.

Under the 2006 Statute of Autonomy, the four Catalan diputacions, which follow the Spanish province system, were to be superseded by seven consells de vegueries, additionally taking over many of the comarques' functions. However, in June 2010, the Spanish Constitutional Court declared any changes to the statewide provinces system as unconstitutional, thus only allowing vegueries as long as the provinces system remained. The Vegueries Law was approved on 27 July 2010 in Parliament. The approval provided for the replacement of the provincial councils by their own bodies, the vegueria councils (consell de vegueria), formed by the president and the vegueria councillors. Although the law allows for an inter-municipal government and the organisation of the services of the Generalitat de Catalunya, the unapproved proposal aims to replace the current provincial deputations and to make the administrative structures more efficient.

The law does not define any vegueria capitals and allows for creating or deleting any. After some opposition from some territories, it was made possible for the Aran Valley to retain its government (included in the Regional Plan as Alt Pirineu i Aran, vegueria named Alt Pirineu) and on August 3, 2016, Parliament approved the legislative initiative that advocated the creation of the eighth vegueria, Penedès.
